= List of Kentucky supplemental roads and rural secondary highways (500–599) =

Kentucky supplemental roads and rural secondary highways (500–599)
- Highway markers for KY 500 and KY 599

Highway names
- Interstates: Interstate nn (I-nn)
- US Highways: U.S. Highway nn (US nn)
- State: KY nn

System links
- Kentucky State Highway System; Interstate; US; State; Parkways
- Supplemental/Rural Secondary; 1–199; 200–299; 300–399; 400–499; 500–599; 600–699; 700–799; 800–899; 900–999; 1000–1499; 1500–1999; 2000–2499; 2500–2999; 3000–3499; 3500–6999

Kentucky supplemental roads and rural secondary highways are the lesser two of the four functional classes of highways constructed and maintained by the Kentucky Transportation Cabinet, the state-level agency that constructs and maintains highways in Kentucky. The agency splits its inventory of state highway mileage into four categories:

- The State Primary System includes Interstate Highways, Parkways, and other long-distance highways of statewide importance that connect the state's major cities, including much of the courses of Kentucky's U.S. Highways.
- The State Secondary System includes highways of regional importance that connect the state's smaller urban centers, including those county seats not served by the state primary system.
- The Rural Secondary System includes highways of local importance, such as farm-to-market roads and urban collectors.
- Supplemental Roads are the set of highways not in the first three systems, including frontage roads, bypassed portions of other state highways, and rural roads that only serve their immediate area.

The same-numbered highway can comprise sections of road under different categories. This list contains descriptions of Supplemental Roads and highways in the Rural Secondary System numbered 500 to 599 that do not have portions within the State Primary and State Secondary systems.

== Kentucky Route 500 ==
Kentucky Route 500
- Location: St. Joseph–Curdsville
- Length: 3.180 mi (5.118 km)

Kentucky Route 500 is a 3.180-mile-long (5.118 km) rural secondary highway in western Daviess County. The highway begins at KY 56 at St. Joseph. KY 500 heads north toward Curdsville, meeting the west end of KY 456 south of the village. The highway enters the village along Main Street then passes through three right-angle turns before reaching a dead end at the confluence of Panther Creek with the Green River.

== Kentucky Route 501 ==
Kentucky Route 501
- Location: Phil-near Kings Mountain
- Length: 23.402 mi (37.662 km)

Kentucky Route 501 (KY 501) is a 23.730-mile-long (38.190 km) state highway that runs from Kentucky Route 910 at Phil to U.S. Route 27 northeast of Kings Mountain via Kings Mountain.

=== Major intersections ===
County	Location	mi	km	Destinations	Notes
Casey	Phil	0.000	0.000	KY 910 (Berea Road)	Southern terminus
Casey		8.830– 8.839	14.211– 14.225	KY 1649 (Poplar Hill Road / Dry Ridge Road)	
Casey		11.180	17.992	KY 70 east	West end of KY 70 overlap
Casey		11.843	19.059	KY 70 west	East end of KY 70 overlap
Casey		16.951	27.280	KY 3270 west (Indian Creek Road)	Eastern terminus of KY 3270
Casey		18.261	29.388	KY 837 south (Walltown Road)	Northern terminus of KY 837
Lincoln	Kings Mountain	21.032	33.848	KY 3539 north (Duncan Road) / Old South Fork Road	Southern terminus of KY 3539
Lincoln	Kings Mountain	21.296	34.273	KY 3539 south (Duncan Road)	Northern terminus of KY 3539
Lincoln		22.220	35.760	KY 1778 west (South Fork Road)	Eastern terminus of KY 1778
Lincoln		23.626	38.022	KY 1247 (Old Somerset Road)	
Lincoln		23.730	38.190	US 27 (Somerset Road)	Northern terminus
1.000 mi = 1.609 km; 1.000 km = 0.621 mi: Concurrency terminus

== Kentucky Route 502 ==
Kentucky Route 502
- Location: Rabbit Ridge-near Nebo
- Length: 10.235 mi (16.472 km)

Kentucky Route 502 (KY 502) is a 10.235-mile-long (16.472 km) state highway in Hopkins County that runs from Kentucky Route 109 and Bone Road at Rabbit Ridge to Old Morganfield Road and Balls Hill Road north of Nebo via Nebo.

=== Major intersections ===
The entire route is in Hopkins County.

Location	mi	km	Destinations	Notes
Rabbit Ridge	0.000	0.000	KY 109 (Rabbit Ridge Road) / Bone Road	Southern terminus; continues as Bone Road beyond KY 109
	6.154	9.904	KY 1034 (Rose Creek Road)	
Nebo	8.348	13.435	US 41 Alt. (Nebo Road)	
	10.235	16.472	Old Morganfield Road / Balls Hill Road	Northern terminus; continues as Balls Hill Road beyond Old Morganfield Road
1.000 mi = 1.609 km; 1.000 km = 0.621 mi

== Kentucky Route 503 ==
Kentucky Route 503
- Location: near Princess-Wurtland
- Length: 10.759 mi (17.315 km)

Kentucky Route 503 (KY 503) is a 10.579-mile-long (17.025 km) state highway that runs from Kentucky Route 5 north of Princess to Kentucky Route 3105 and Industrial Road in Wurtland via Naples and Danleyton.

=== Major intersections ===
County	Location	mi	km	Destinations	Notes
Boyd		0.000	0.000	KY 5	Southern terminus
Greenup		6.481	10.430	KY 207 north (Argillite Road)	South end of KY 207 overlap
Greenup		6.953	11.190	KY 207 south (Argillite Road)	North end of KY 207 overlap
Greenup	Wurtland	10.576	17.020	US 23	
Greenup	Wurtland	10.759	17.315	KY 3105 (Wurtland Avenue) / Industrial Road	Northern terminus; continues as Industrial Road beyond KY 3105
1.000 mi = 1.609 km; 1.000 km = 0.621 mi: Concurrency terminus

== Kentucky Route 504 ==
Kentucky Route 504
- Location: near Elliottville-Green
- Length: 16.713 mi (26.897 km)

Kentucky Route 504 (KY 504) is a 16.713-mile-long (26.897 km) state highway that runs from Kentucky Route 32 just east of Elliottville to Kentucky Route 7 at Green via Ault and Gimlet.

=== Major intersections ===
County	Location	mi	km	Destinations	Notes
Rowan		0.000	0.000	KY 32 (Christy Creek Road)	Southern terminus
Carter–Elliott county line		2.797	4.501	KY 955 north	Southern terminus of KY 955
Elliott		4.950	7.966	KY 649 east	Western terminus of KY 649
Elliott		8.909	14.338	KY 1620 north	Southern terminus of KY 1620
Elliott		9.560	15.385	KY 1555 east	Western terminus of KY 1555
Elliott		14.287	22.993	KY 649 east (Skaggs Flat Road)	South end of KY 649 overlap
Elliott		14.629	23.543	KY 649 west	North end of KY 649 overlap
Elliott	Green	16.713	26.897	KY 7	Northern terminus
1.000 mi = 1.609 km; 1.000 km = 0.621 mi: Concurrency terminus

== Kentucky Route 505 ==
Kentucky Route 505
- Location: near Cromwell–near Olaton
- Length: 18.993 mi (30.566 km)

Kentucky Route 505 (KY 505) is a 18.993-mile-long (30.566 km) rural secondary highway in eastern Ohio County. The highway extends from US 231 southeast of Cromwell north to KY 878 at Olaton via Oak Grove, Select, Baizetown, and Windy Hill. KY 505 begins at US 231 () southeast of Cromwell. The highway heads northeast, bridges the West Prong of Indian Camp Creek, and crosses over the William H. Natcher Parkway. The highway gradually curves east as it crosses three branches of Indian Camp Creek and passes through Oak Grove and Select. At Baizetown, KY 505 meets the northern end of KY 1118 and turns north. The highway crosses the Western Kentucky Parkway on its way to Windy Hill, where the route meets the western end of KY 2713. KY 505 crosses over the Paducah and Louisville Railway shortly before its junction with US 62 east of Rosine. The two highway run concurrently east until KY 505 splits north near Horse Branch. KY 505 continues along Dan Road, which crosses Muddy Creek and a branch of Caney Creek before reaching its northern terminus at KY 878 at Olaton.

=== Major intersections ===
The entire route is in Ohio County.

Location	mi	km	Destinations	Notes
	0.000	0.000	US 231	Southern terminus
Baizetown	4.689	7.546	KY 1118 south	Northern terminus of KY 1118
Windy Hill	8.476	13.641	KY 2713 south	Northern terminus of KY 2713
	11.758	18.923	US 62 west	South end of US 62 overlap
	13.618	21.916	US 62 east	North end of US 62 overlap
	18.993	30.566	KY 878	Northern terminus
1.000 mi = 1.609 km; 1.000 km = 0.621 mi: Concurrency terminus

== Kentucky Route 506 ==
Kentucky Route 506
- Location: near Enon-Marion
- Length: 10.245 mi (16.488 km)

Kentucky Route 506 (KY 506) is a 10.245-mile-long (16.488 km) state highway that runs from Kentucky Route 902 northeast of Enon to U.S. Route 60, Kentucky Route 91, and West Depot Street in downtown Marion via Piney Fork.

=== Major intersections ===
County	Location	mi	km	Destinations	Notes
Caldwell		0.000	0.000	KY 902	Southern terminus
Crittenden		5.250	8.449	KY 1077 south	Northern terminus of KY 1077
Crittenden	Marion	10.245	16.488	US 60 (South Main Street) / KY 91 / West Depot Street	Northern terminus; continues as West Depot Street beyond US 60 / KY 91
1.000 mi = 1.609 km; 1.000 km = 0.621 mi

== Kentucky Route 507 ==
Kentucky Route 507
- Location: Hopkinsville–Claymour
- Length: 23.402 mi (37.662 km)

Kentucky Route 507 (KY 507) is a 23.402-mile-long (37.662 km) rural secondary highway in eastern Christian County and northern Todd County. The highway extends from KY 107 in Hopkinsville east to KY 106 and KY 178 at Claymour via Allegre. KY 507 begins at a three-way intersection with KY 107 in the city of Hopkinsville. KY 107 heads west along East Seventh Street and northeast along Greenville Road, and KY 507 heads east along East Seventh Street. Further east, KY 507 splits northeast along Butler Road while KY 1979 continues along East Seventh Street to US 68 and KY 80. KY 507 heads northeast and meets the western end of KY 508, which continues on Butler Road while KY 507 continues on Pilot Rock Road. The route twice crosses Lower Branch of the North Fork of the Little River on its way to Pleasant Hill.

KY 507 crosses the South Fork of the Little River before crossing the Christian–Todd county line. The highway continues east and meets the eastern end of KY 189 (Moss Road) just west of the route's bridge across Buck Fork Creek. KY 507 crosses the Shelton Branch of the Pond River just west of Allegre, where the route intersects KY 171 (Allegre Road). The highway continues along Highland Lick Road, which crosses the Pond River and intersects KY 181 (Greenville Road) south of Cedar Grove. KY 507 continues southeast to Claymour, the site of the route's terminus at a four-way intersection with KY 106 (Sharon Grove Road) and KY 178, which takes over the course of Highland Lick Road.

=== Major intersections ===
County	Location	mi	km	Destinations	Notes
Christian	Hopkinsville	0.000	0.000	KY 107 (East Seventh Street / Greenville Road)	Western terminus
Christian	Hopkinsville	0.379	0.610	KY 1979 east (East Seventh Street)	Western terminus of KY 1979
Christian		3.646	5.868	KY 508 east (Butler Road)	Western terminus of KY 508
Todd		13.605	21.895	KY 189 north (Moss Road) / Flat Rock Road	Southern terminus of KY 189
Todd	Allegre	16.022	25.785	KY 171 (Allegre Road)	
Todd		19.943	32.095	KY 181 (Greenville Road)	
Todd	Claymour	23.402	37.662	KY 106 (Sharon Grove Road) / KY 178 east (Highland Lick Road)	Eastern terminus; continues as KY 178 beyond KY 106
1.000 mi = 1.609 km; 1.000 km = 0.621 mi

== Kentucky Route 508 ==
Kentucky Route 508
- Location: near Hopkinsville–near Liberty
- Length: 13.805 mi (22.217 km)

Kentucky Route 508 (KY 508) is a 13.805-mile-long (22.217 km) rural secondary highway in eastern Christian County and western Todd County. The highway begins at KY 507 east of Hopkinsville. KY 507 heads west along Butler Road and northeast along Pilot Rock Road; KY 508 heads southeast along Butler Road, which veers east at its junction with KY 1716 (Overby Lane). The highway crosses the South Fork of the Little River just west of its junction with KY 1843 (Vaughns Grove Fairview Road). KY 508 passes through Honey Grove before crossing the Christian–Todd county line. The highway follows Butler Road through Britmart to Tabernacle. From there, KY 508 follows Liberty–Britmart Road to its east end at Liberty.

=== Major intersections ===
County	Location	mi	km	Destinations	Notes
Christian		0.000	0.000	KY 507 (Butler Road / Pilot Lock Road)	Western terminus
Christian		0.927	1.492	KY 1716 south (Overby Lane)	Northern terminus of KY 1716
Christian		4.302	6.923	KY 1843 south (Vaughns Grove Fairview Road)	Northern terminus of KY 1843
Todd		13.805	22.217	KY 171 (Allegre Road)	Eastern terminus
1.000 mi = 1.609 km; 1.000 km = 0.621 mi

== Kentucky Route 509 ==
Kentucky Route 509
- Location: near Samuels–near Fairfield
- Length: 9.782 mi (15.743 km)

Kentucky Route 509 (KY 509) is a 9.782-mile-long (15.743 km) rural secondary highway in northwestern Nelson County. The highway begins at KY 245 (New Shepherdsville Road) south of Samuels. KY 509 heads north along Samuels Loop to Samuels, where the route meets the eastern end of KY 3207, also part of Samuels Loop, and has a grade crossing of an R.J. Corman Railroad Group rail line where it turns east onto Samuels Road. KY 509 heads northeast along Samuels Creek to its mouth at Froman Creek and crosses the latter creek, where the route continues east to Coxs Creek. There, the highway meets the southern end of KY 2739 (Lenore Road) and intersects US 31E and US 150 (Louisville Road). KY 509 continues east as Fairfield Road, which crosses Cox Creek and reaches its eastern terminus at KY 48 (Highgrove Road) west of the city of Fairfield.

=== Major intersections ===
The entire route is in Nelson County.

Location	mi	km	Destinations	Notes
	0.000	0.000	KY 245 (New Shepherdsville Road) / Hall Loop	Western terminus
Samuels	0.511	0.822	KY 3207 north (Samuels Loop)	Southern terminus of KY 3207
Coxs Creek	4.506	7.252	KY 2739 north (Lenore Road)	Southern terminus of KY 2739
Coxs Creek	4.550	7.323	US 31E (Louisville Road) / US 150	
	9.782	15.743	KY 48 (Highgrove Road)	Eastern terminus
1.000 mi = 1.609 km; 1.000 km = 0.621 mi

== Kentucky Route 510 ==
Kentucky Route 510
- Location: Pine Mountain-near Gordon
- Length: 10.124 mi (16.293 km)

Kentucky Route 510 (KY 510) is a 10.124-mile-long (16.293 km) state highway that runs from Kentucky Route 221 at Pine Mountain to Kentucky Route 463 north of Gordon via Gilley.

=== Major intersections ===
County	Location	mi	km	Destinations	Notes
Harlan	Pine Mountain	0.000	0.000	KY 221	Western terminus
Letcher		10.124	16.293	KY 463	Eastern terminus
1.000 mi = 1.609 km; 1.000 km = 0.621 mi

== Kentucky Route 511 ==
Kentucky Route 511
- Location: near Youngs Creek-Rockholds
- Length: 7.331 mi (11.798 km)

Kentucky Route 511 (KY 511) is a 7.331-mile-long (11.798 km) state highway that runs from U.S. Route 25W east of Youngs Creek to Kentucky Route 26 and Youngs Lane at Rockholds via Walden.

=== Major intersections ===
The entire route is in Whitley County.

Location	mi	km	Destinations	Notes
	0.000	0.000	US 25W	Western terminus
	5.289	8.512	KY 836 south (Cripple Creek Road)	Northern terminus of KY 836
Rockholds	7.331	11.798	KY 26 / Youngs Lane	Eastern terminus; continues as Youngs Lane beyond KY 26
1.000 mi = 1.609 km; 1.000 km = 0.621 mi

== Kentucky Route 512 ==
Kentucky Route 512
- Location: Birdie-near Alton
- Length: 9.927 mi (15.976 km)

Kentucky Route 512 (KY 512) is a 9.927-mile-long (15.976 km) state highway that runs from Kentucky Route 395 at Birdie to U.S. Route 127 east of Alton via Alton Station and Alton.

=== Major intersections ===
The entire route is in Anderson County.

Location	mi	km	Destinations	Notes
Birdie	0.000	0.000	KY 395 (Waddy Road / Birdie Road)	Western terminus
	5.286	8.507	KY 1875 north (Avenstoke Road)	Southern terminus of KY 1875
Alton	7.904	12.720	KY 151 south (Alton Road)	West end of KY 151 overlap
Alton	8.805	14.170	KY 151 north (Graefenburg Road)	East end of KY 151 overlap
	9.927	15.976	US 127 / Keaton Lane	Eastern terminus; continues as Keaton Lane beyond US 127
1.000 mi = 1.609 km; 1.000 km = 0.621 mi: Concurrency terminus

== Kentucky Route 513 ==
Kentucky Route 513
- Location: Fox Creek-near McBrayer
- Length: 9.331 mi (15.017 km)

Kentucky Route 513 (KY 513) is a 9.331-mile-long (15.017 km) state highway that runs from U.S. Route 62 at Fox Creek to Harry Wise Road and Gilberts Creek Road east of McBrayer via McBrayer.

=== Major intersections ===
The entire route is in Anderson County.

Location	mi	km	Destinations	Notes
Fox Creek	0.000	0.000	US 62 (Fox Creek Road)	Western terminus
	4.157	6.690	KY 749 west (Bonds Mill Fox Creek Road)	Eastern terminus of KY 749
	5.482	8.822	US 127 north (Harrodsburg Road)	West end of US 127 overlap
	5.918– 5.949	9.524– 9.574	Bluegrass Parkway – Elizabethtown, Lexington	Bluegrass Pkwy exits 59A-B
	6.146	9.891	US 127 south (Harrodsburg Road)	East end of US 127 overlap
	9.331	15.017	Harry Wise Road / Gilberts Creek Road	Eastern terminus; continues as Gilberts Creek Road beyond Harry Wise Road
1.000 mi = 1.609 km; 1.000 km = 0.621 mi: Concurrency terminus

== Kentucky Route 514 ==
Kentucky Route 514
- Location: near Hopson-near Cobb
- Length: 8.685 mi (13.977 km)

Kentucky Route 514 (KY 514) is a 8.685-mile-long (13.977 km) state highway in Caldwell County that runs from Ferguson Road at the Caldwell-Lyon County line west of Hopson to Kentucky Routes 126 and 128 northwest of Cobb via Hopson.

=== Major intersections ===
The entire route is in Caldwell County.

Location	mi	km	Destinations	Notes
	0.000	0.000	Ferguson Road	Western terminus; Lyon County line; continues as Ferguson Road beyond county line
	0.861	1.386	KY 1451 north (Grooms Lane)	Southern terminus of KY 1451
	3.287	5.290	KY 139 north (Cadiz Road)	West end of KY 139 overlap
Hopson	4.429	7.128	KY 139 south (Cadiz Road)	East end of KY 139 overlap
	8.685	13.977	KY 126 / KY 128	Eastern terminus
1.000 mi = 1.609 km; 1.000 km = 0.621 mi: Concurrency terminus

== Kentucky Route 515 ==
Kentucky Route 515
- Location: near Princeton
- Length: 2.666 mi (4.291 km)

Kentucky Route 515 (KY 515) is a 2.666-mile-long (4.291 km) state highway in Caldwell County that runs from Kentucky Route 903 to Kentucky Route 139 south-southeast of Princeton.

== Kentucky Route 516 ==
Kentucky Route 516
- Location: near Meldrum-near Ferndale
- Length: 1.305 mi (2.100 km)

Kentucky Route 516 (KY 516) is a 1.305-mile-long (2.100 km) state highway in Bell County.

== Kentucky Route 517 ==
Kentucky Route 517
- Location: near Cedar Springs
- Length: 2.800 mi (4.506 km)

Kentucky Route 517 (KY 517) is a 2.800-mile-long (4.506 km) state highway in Allen County that runs from Kentucky Route 252 to Bailey Point Road and Hix Road northeast of Cedar Springs along the shore of Barren River Lake.

=== History ===
KY 517 was formed after 1958.

The original KY 517 ran from US 231 southeast of Greenwood south to KY 240; this became part of KY 622 when it was extended north.

== Kentucky Route 518 ==
Kentucky Route 518
- Location: Hustonville-Mt. Salem
- Existed: 2001

Kentucky Route 518 (KY 518) was a state highway in Lincoln County. It ran from KY 78 in Hustonville via Mt. Salem Road to KY 198 in Mt. Salem. The highway was decommissioned on October 22, 2001, and the road (along with intersecting KY 1562) was given to Lincoln County.

== Kentucky Route 520 ==
Kentucky Route 520
- Location: near Anthoston-Coraville
- Length: 2.910 mi (4.683 km)

Kentucky Route 520 (KY 520) is a 2.910-mile-long (4.683 km) state highway in Henderson County that runs from Kentucky Route 136 southeast of Anthoston to Kentucky Route 416 and Upper Delaware Road at Coraville.

=== History ===
KY 520 was formed by 1958.

The original KY 520 ran from KY 65 (now KY 259) in Westview east to Mook; this became part of KY 690 in 1954-1957 when it was extended southwest.

== Kentucky Route 521 ==
Kentucky Route 521
- Location: near Lesbas-near Brock
- Length: 2.898 mi (4.664 km)

Kentucky Route 521 (KY 521) is a 2.898-mile-long (4.664 km) state highway in Laurel County that runs from Kentucky Route 1189 southwest of Lesbas to Kentucky Route 80 southwest of Brock.

=== Major intersections ===
The entire route is in Laurel County.

Location	mi	km	Destinations	Notes
	0.000	0.000	KY 1189 (River Road)	Southern terminus
	2.898	4.664	KY 80 (East Laurel Road)	Northern terminus
1.000 mi = 1.609 km; 1.000 km = 0.621 mi

== Kentucky Route 522 ==
Kentucky Route 522
- Location: Rosspoint-Sand Hill
- Length: 17.665 mi (28.429 km)

Kentucky Route 522 (KY 522) is a 17.665-mile-long (28.429 km) state highway in Harlan County that runs from U.S. Route 119 and Ross Drive in Rosspoint to Kentucky Route 160 at Sand Hill via Rosspoint, Rhea, Dillon, Laden, Nolansburg, Totz, Dione, Hiram, and Chad. It is the original alignment of US 119.

=== History ===
KY 522 was formed when US 119 was rerouted in 1973–1977.

The original KY 522 ran from Kuttawa to US 68 in Twin Lakes; this was cancelled when most of this route was inundated by the creation of Lake Barkley in 1964; surviving parts are now First Street, Kuttawa Lane, Brandon Chapel Road, and Big Bear Highway.

=== Major intersections ===
The entire route is in Harlan County.

Location	mi	km	Destinations	Notes
Rosspoint	0.000	0.000	US 119 / Ross Drive	Southern terminus; continues as Ross Drive beyond US 119
Rosspoint	0.600	0.966	KY 413 west	Eastern terminus of KY 413
Laden	6.245	10.050	KY 2010 south	South end of KY 2010 overlap
Laden	6.277	10.102	KY 2010 north	North end of KY 2010 overlap
Sand Hill	17.665	28.429	KY 160	Northern terminus
1.000 mi = 1.609 km; 1.000 km = 0.621 mi: Concurrency terminus

== Kentucky Route 523 ==
Kentucky Route 523
- Location: near Deatsville-Highgrove
- Length: 9.691 mi (15.596 km)

Kentucky Route 523 (KY 523) is a 9.691-mile-long (15.596 km) state highway in Nelson County that runs from Kentucky Route 245 and Marr Lane southeast of Deatsville and going through Deatsville and Lenore. KY 523 was extended on its eastern end upon the completion of a realigned section of Louisville Road (US 31E / US 150). KY 523 now follows the former alignment of Louisville Road from its former terminus 2 miles south of High Grove northward for approximately 4½ miles to the new Louisville Road. That is south of the Salt River bridge at the border between Spencer County and Bullitt County. The new section also includes a 1½ mile concurrency with Kentucky Route 48, which was also slightly extended to meet up the newer incarnation of US 31E / US 150

== Kentucky Route 524 ==
Kentucky Route 524
- Location: near Russell Corner-near Oldham
- Length: 12.148 mi (19.550 km)

Kentucky Route 524 (KY 524) is a 12.148-mile-long (19.550 km) state highway in Oldham County that runs from and to U.S. Route 42 via Westport.

=== Major intersections ===
The entire route is in Oldham County.

Location	mi	km	Destinations	Notes
	0.000	0.000	US 42	Western terminus
	9.341	15.033	KY 1488 north (Organ Creek Road)	Southern terminus of KY 1488
	12.148	19.550	US 42	Northern terminus
1.000 mi = 1.609 km; 1.000 km = 0.621 mi

== Kentucky Route 525 ==
Kentucky Route 525
- Location: near Roaring Spring-near Cadiz
- Length: 9.370 mi (15.080 km)

Kentucky Route 525 (KY 525) is a 9.691-mile-long (15.596 km) state highway in Trigg County that runs from Kentucky Route 164 west of Roaring Spring to Kentucky Route 139 south of Cadiz.

=== Major intersections ===
The entire route is in Trigg County.

Location	mi	km	Destinations	Notes
	0.000	0.000	KY 164 (Roaring Springs Road)	Southern terminus
	3.075	4.949	KY 1253 north (Hardy Road)	Southern terminus of KY 1253
	9.370	15.080	KY 139 (South Road)	Northern terminus
1.000 mi = 1.609 km; 1.000 km = 0.621 mi

== Kentucky Route 529 ==
Kentucky Route 529
- Location: Booker-near Mooresville
- Length: 1.809 mi (2.911 km)

Eastern Terminus of KY 529

Kentucky Route 529 (KY 529) is a 1.809-mile-long (2.911 km) state highway in Washington County that runs from Valley Hill Road and Croakes Station Road at Booker to Kentucky Route 55 west of Mooresville.

== Kentucky Route 530 ==
Kentucky Route 530
- Location: near Columbia
- Length: 1.784 mi (2.871 km)

Kentucky Route 530 (KY 530) is a 1.784-mile-long (2.871 km) state highway in Adair County that runs from Kentucky Route 55 and Keltner Road to Kentucky Route 2971 north of Columbia.

== Kentucky Route 531 ==
Kentucky Route 531
- Location: near Ozark-Christine
- Length: 5.301 mi (8.531 km)

Kentucky Route 531 (KY 531) is a 5.301-mile-long (8.531 km) state highway in Adair County that runs from Kentucky Route 80 east of Ozark to Kentucky Route 206 at Christine via Craycraft.

=== Major intersections ===
The entire route is in Adair County.

Location	mi	km	Destinations	Notes
	0.000	0.000	KY 80 (Russell Springs Road)	Southern terminus
Christine	5.301	8.531	KY 206 (Liberty Road)	Northern terminus
1.000 mi = 1.609 km; 1.000 km = 0.621 mi

== Kentucky Route 532 ==
Kentucky Route 532
- Location: near Hatcher
- Length: 2.302 mi (3.705 km)

Kentucky Route 532 (KY 532) is a 2.302-mile-long (3.705 km) state highway in Adair County that runs from New Cedar Grove Road at the Green County line to Kentucky Route 61 southwest of Hatcher.

== Kentucky Route 533 ==
Kentucky Route 533
- Location: near Edmonton-near Breeding
- Length: 16.673 mi (26.833 km)

Kentucky Route 533 (KY 533) is a 16.673-mile-long (26.833 km) state highway in that runs from Kentucky Route 496 southeast of Edmonton to Independence Ridge Road and Pelston Cemetery Road east of Breeding via Cofer and Breeding.

=== Major intersections ===
County	Location	mi	km	Destinations	Notes
Metcalfe		0.000	0.000	KY 496	Western terminus
Metcalfe		2.360	3.798	KY 2390 north (Hickory Ridge Road)	Northern terminus of KY 2390
Adair		11.743	18.899	KY 61 (Burkesville Road)	
Adair		16.673	26.833	Independence Ridge Road / Pelston Cemetery Road	Eastern terminus; continues as Independence Ridge Road beyond Pelston Cemetery Road
1.000 mi = 1.609 km; 1.000 km = 0.621 mi

== Kentucky Route 534 ==
Kentucky Route 534
- Location: near Clear Springs-Symsonia
- Length: 5.152 mi (8.291 km)

Kentucky Route 534 (KY 534) is a 5.152-mile-long (8.291 km) state highway in Graves County that runs from Kentucky Route 408 and Wayne Freeman Road northeast of Clear Springs to Kentucky Route 348 in southeastern Symsonia.

=== History ===
KY 534 was formed as a renumbering of part of KY 564 when that road was decommissioned north of KY 58.

The original KY 534 ran from KY 70 in Knob Lick (Metcalfe County) south and west to Big Meadow Road in Barren County; part of this route became part of KY 640, and the rest is now Crenshaw Cassady Road.

=== Major intersections ===
The entire route is in Graves County.

Location	mi	km	Destinations	Notes
	0.600	0.966	KY 408 east / Wayne Freeman Road	Southern terminus; western terminus of eastern segment of KY 408; continues as Wayne Freeman Road beyond KY 408
Symsonia	5.152	8.291	KY 348	
1.000 mi = 1.609 km; 1.000 km = 0.621 mi

== Kentucky Route 535 ==
Kentucky Route 535
- Location: Fonde
- Length: 0.600 mi (966 m)

Kentucky Route 535 (KY 535) is a 0.600-mile-long (0.966 km) state highway in Fonde, Bell County that runs from Kentucky Route 74 to a dead end.

== Kentucky Route 537 ==
Kentucky Route 537
- Location: near Paris-near Stoops
- Length: 22.123 mi (35.604 km)

Kentucky Route 537 (KY 537) is a 22.123-mile-long (35.604 km) state highway that runs from U.S. Route 460 east of Paris to U.S. Route 60 east of Stoops via Cane Ridge, Little Rock, Plum, Bunker Hill, Judy, and Stoops.

=== Major intersections ===
County	Location	mi	km	Destinations	Notes
Bourbon		0.000	0.000	US 460 (North Middletown Road)	Western terminus
Bourbon		6.638	10.683	KY 3364 south (College Road)	Northern terminus of KY 3364
Bourbon	Plum	11.202	18.028	KY 57 south (Levy Road)	West end of KY 57 overlap
Bourbon	Plum	11.303	18.190	KY 57 north (Carlisle Road)	East end of KY 57 overlap
Montgomery		15.039	24.203	KY 3362 west (Aarons Run Road)	Eastern terminus of KY 3362
Montgomery	Judy	17.068	27.468	KY 11 Bus.	
Montgomery		17.533	28.217	KY 11 (Maysville Road)	
Montgomery	Stoops	19.657	31.635	KY 1991 south (Hinkston Pike)	Northern terminus of KY 1991
Montgomery		20.681	33.283	KY 3289 north (Springfield Road)	Southern terminus of KY 3289
Montgomery		22.123	35.604	US 60 (Owingsville Road)	Eastern terminus
1.000 mi = 1.609 km; 1.000 km = 0.621 mi: Concurrency terminus

== Kentucky Route 539 ==
Kentucky Route 539
- Location: near Mount Olivet-near Neave.
- Length: 15.935 mi (25.645 km)

Kentucky Route 539 (KY 539) is a 15.935-mile-long (25.645 km) state highway that runs from U.S. Route 62 west of Mount Olivet to Kentucky Route 22 east of Neave via Bratton, Santa Fe, and Milford.

=== Major intersections ===
County	Location	mi	km	Destinations	Notes
Robertson		0.000	0.000	US 62 (Kentontown Road)	Southern terminus
Robertson		1.667	2.683	KY 2897 west (Chapel Road)	Eastern terminus of KY 2897
Bracken	Milford	8.477	13.642	KY 19 north (Powersville-Harrison County Road)	South end of KY 19 overlap
Bracken	Milford	8.790	14.146	KY 19 south (Powersville-Harrison County Road)	North end of KY 19 overlap
Bracken		15.935	25.645	KY 22 (Willow Neave Road)	Northern terminus
1.000 mi = 1.609 km; 1.000 km = 0.621 mi: Concurrency terminus

== Kentucky Route 540 ==
Kentucky Route 540
- Location: near Keck-near Taulbee
- Length: 3.748 mi (6.032 km)

Kentucky Route 540 (KY 540) is a 3.748-mile-long (6.032 km) state highway in Breathitt County that runs from Kentucky Route 1812 northwest of Keck to Steel Fork Road and Strong Fork Road southeast of Taulbee.

=== Major intersections ===
The entire route is in Breathitt County.

Location	mi	km	Destinations	Notes
	0.000	0.000	KY 1812 (Kentontown Road)	Western terminus
	3.748	6.032	Steel Fork Road / Strong Fork Road	Eastern terminus; continues as Strong Fork Road beyond Steel Fork Road
1.000 mi = 1.609 km; 1.000 km = 0.621 mi

== Kentucky Route 541 ==
Kentucky Route 541
- Location: near Chenowee-near Fivemile
- Length: 8.245 mi (13.269 km)

Kentucky Route 541 (KY 541) is a 8.245-mile-long (13.269 km) state highway in Breathitt County that runs from Kentucky Route 52 northwest of Chenowee to Kentucky Route 205 northwest of Fivemile via War Creek and Lawson.

=== Major intersections ===
The entire route is in Breathitt County.

Location	mi	km	Destinations	Notes
	0.000	0.000	KY 52 (Beattyville Road)	Southern terminus
	8.245	13.269	KY 205	Northern terminus
1.000 mi = 1.609 km; 1.000 km = 0.621 mi

== Kentucky Route 542 ==
Kentucky Route 542
- Location: near Gage-near Fredville
- Length: 3.748 mi (6.032 km)

Kentucky Route 542 (KY 542) is a 3.748-mile-long (6.032 km) state highway that runs from Kentucky Route 30 southeast of Gage to Kentucky Route 7 southeast of Fredville via Lunah, Lambric, Evanston, and Waldo.

=== Major intersections ===
County	Location	mi	km	Destinations	Notes
Breathitt		0.000	0.000	KY 30	Western terminus
Magoffin		21.389	34.422	KY 1502 south (Trace Fork Road)	Northern terminus of KY 1502
Magoffin		24.391	39.254	KY 7 (Southeast Licking River Road)	Eastern terminus
1.000 mi = 1.609 km; 1.000 km = 0.621 mi

== Kentucky Route 543 ==
Kentucky Route 543
- Location: Clarks Corner-near Beechville
- Length: 3.606 mi (5.803 km)

Kentucky Route 543 (KY 543) is a 3.606-mile-long (5.803 km) state highway in Metcalfe County that runs from Kentucky Route 1243 and Smith Cemetery Road at Clarks Corner to U.S. Route 68 southeast of Beechville.

=== History ===
KY 543 was formed ca. 1959 when KY 640 was rerouted on its current route over parts of former KY 1413 and KY 534.

The original KY 543 ran from KY 403 near Logansport west via Truman Annis Ferry Road; this was removed by 1955.

Another KY 543 ran from US 68 (now Bus. US 68 in Elkton) via Davis Mill Road to KY 104 near Trenton.

=== Major intersections ===
The entire route is in Metcalfe County.

Location	mi	km	Destinations	Notes
Clarks Corner	0.000	0.000	KY 1243 (Knob Lick Road) / Smith Cemetery Road	Western terminus; continues as Smith Cemetery Road beyond KY 1243
	3.606	5.803	US 68 (Greensburg Road)	Eastern terminus
1.000 mi = 1.609 km; 1.000 km = 0.621 mi

== Kentucky Route 544 ==
Kentucky Route 544
- Location: Cork
- Length: 3.526 mi (5.675 km)

Kentucky Route 544 (KY 544) is a 3.526-mile-long (5.675 km) state highway in Metcalfe County that runs from U.S. Route 68 west of Cork to a point on Bridgeport Road immediately east of a bridge across the East Fork of the Little Barren River via Cork.

=== History ===
KY 544 was formed in 1959.

The original KY 544 ran from KY 70 in Butler County north via Little Reedy Road.

=== Major intersections ===
The entire route is in Metcalfe County.

Location	mi	km	Destinations	Notes
	0.000	0.000	US 68 (Greensburg Road)	Western terminus
	3.526	5.675	Bridgeport Road	Eastern terminus; end of state maintenance
1.000 mi = 1.609 km; 1.000 km = 0.621 mi

== Kentucky Route 545 ==
Kentucky Route 545
- Location: near Kirbyton-near Cunningham
- Length: 2.034 mi (3.273 km)

Kentucky Route 545 (KY 545) is a 2.034-mile-long (3.273 km) state highway in Carlisle County that runs from Kentucky Route 408 and Blinco Road northeast of Kirbyton to Kentucky Route 849 southeast of Cunningham.

=== History ===
KY 545 was formed between 1977 and 1981, when KY 849 was rerouted to go west rather than south.

The original KY 545 ran from KY 79 in Butler County to KY 70 in Monford; this was decommissioned by 1977, and is now McKendree Chapel Road.

== Kentucky Route 546 ==
Kentucky Route 546
- Location: Covington-Lloyd
- Existed: 1994

Kentucky Route 546 (KY 546) was a state highway which ran from Covington to the Ohio State Line east of Lloyd. This route was designated on May 26, 1988, and became part of Kentucky Route 9 and Kentucky Route 10 on October 13, 1994.

The original KY 546 ran from KY 106 in northeast Logan County east and northeast to KY 626 in Davis Crossroads in Butler County. This highway was given to the counties by 1977, and is now KY 2377, Hamilton-Lee Road, and Caney Fork Road.

== Kentucky Route 548 ==
Kentucky Route 548
- Location: near Kirbyton
- Length: 1.747 mi (2.812 km)

Kentucky Route 548 (KY 548) is a 1.747-mile-long (2.812 km) state highway in Carlisle County that runs from Kentucky Route 307 north of Kirbyton to Blinco Road northeast of Kirbyton.

== Kentucky Route 549 ==
Kentucky Route 549
- Location: near Mill Creek-near Prestonville
- Length: 4.715 mi (7.588 km)

Kentucky Route 549 (KY 549) is a 4.715-mile-long (7.588 km) state highway in Carroll County that runs from Kentucky Route 55 and Vories Road northwest of Mill Creek to Kentucky Route 55 again southwest of Prestonville.

=== Major intersections ===
The entire route is in Carroll County.

Location	mi	km	Destinations	Notes
	0.000	0.000	KY 55 / Vories Road	Southern terminus; continues as Vories Road beyond KY 55
	4.715	7.588	KY 55 (Newcastle Pike)	Northern terminus
1.000 mi = 1.609 km; 1.000 km = 0.621 mi

== Kentucky Route 551 ==
Kentucky Route 551
- Location: Columbia-near Clementsville
- Length: 24.169 mi (38.896 km)

Kentucky Route 551 (KY 551) is a 24.169-mile-long (38.896 km) state highway that runs from Kentucky Route 55 in far northern Columbia to Kentucky Route 1615 northeast of Clementsville via Absher.

=== Major intersections ===
County	Location	mi	km	Destinations	Notes
Adair	Columbia	0.000	0.000	KY 55 (Campbellsville Road)	Southern terminus
Adair		0.401	0.645	KY 901 east (Pelly Lane)	Western terminus of KY 901
Adair		2.345	3.774	KY 2971 north (Holmes Bend Road)	Southern terminus of KY 2971
Adair		3.792	6.103	KY 1323 south (Bull Run Road)	Northern terminus of KY 1323
Adair		11.941	19.217	KY 76 (Elkhorn Road)	
Adair		14.727	23.701	KY 1742 north (Dry Creek Road)	Southern terminus of KY 1742
Casey	Clementsville	19.117	30.766	KY 70 east	South end of KY 70 overlap
Casey	Clementsville	19.165	30.843	KY 70 west	North end of KY 70 overlap
Casey		24.169	38.896	KY 1615 (Tennessee Ridge Road)	Eastern terminus
1.000 mi = 1.609 km; 1.000 km = 0.621 mi: Concurrency terminus

== Kentucky Route 552 ==
Kentucky Route 552
- Location: near Hightop-near Lily
- Length: 9.429 mi (15.175 km)

Kentucky Route 552 (KY 552) is a 9.429-mile-long (15.175 km) state highway in Laurel County that runs from Kentucky Route 192 northeast of Hightop to U.S. Route 25 and Slate Ridge Road northeast of Lily via Lily.

=== Major intersections ===
The entire route is in Laurel County.

Location	mi	km	Destinations	Notes
	0.000	0.000	KY 192 (West Laurel Road)	Western terminus
	3.087	4.968	KY 363 north (Keavy Road)	West end of KY 363 overlap
	4.351	7.002	KY 363 south (Keavy Road)	East end of KY 363 overlap
	9.429	15.175	US 25 (Laurel Road) / Slate Ridge Road	Eastern terminus; continues as Slate Ridge Road beyond US 25
1.000 mi = 1.609 km; 1.000 km = 0.621 mi: Concurrency terminus

== Kentucky Route 553 ==
Kentucky Route 553
- Location: near Shipley-Albany
- Length: 7.638 mi (12.292 km)

Kentucky Route 553 (KY 553) is a 7.638-mile-long (12.292 km) state highway in Clinton County that runs from a boat dock on the shore of Dale Hollow Lake west of Shipley to southbound U.S. Route 127 Business in southern Albany.

=== Major intersections ===
The entire route is in Clinton County.

Location	mi	km	Destinations	Notes
	0.000	0.000	Boat dock	Western terminus
	1.708	2.749	KY 639 north	Southern terminus of KY 639
	4.958	7.979	KY 3065 south (Martha Stockton Road)	Northern terminus of KY 3065
	6.447	10.375	US 127	
Albany	7.638	12.292	US 127 Bus. south (Water Street)	Eastern terminus; access to US 127 Bus. north via US 127 Bus. south
1.000 mi = 1.609 km; 1.000 km = 0.621 mi: Incomplete access

== Kentucky Route 554 ==
Kentucky Route 554
- Location: near Guffie-near Pettit
- Length: 11.426 mi (18.388 km)

Kentucky Route 554 (KY 554) is a 11.426-mile-long (18.388 km) state highway that runs from Kentucky Route 815 north of Guffie to U.S. Route 431 south of Pettit via Panther and Tuck.

=== Major intersections ===
County	Location	mi	km	Destinations	Notes
McLean		0.000	0.000	KY 815	Western terminus
Daviess		1.600	2.575	KY 2156 south (May Road)	Northern terminus of KY 2156
Daviess		2.443	3.932	KY 815	
Daviess	Panther	4.238	6.820	KY 1514 east (Greenback Road)	South end of KY 1514 overlap
Daviess	Panther	4.288	6.901	KY 1514 west (Greenback Road)	North end of KY 1514 overlap
Daviess		6.313	10.160	KY 81 south	South end of KY 81 overlap
Daviess		7.126	11.468	KY 81 north	North end of KY 81 overlap
Daviess	Tuck	10.188	16.396	KY 2127 (Todd Bridge Road)	
Daviess		11.426	18.388	US 431	Northern terminus
1.000 mi = 1.609 km; 1.000 km = 0.621 mi: Concurrency terminus

== Kentucky Route 557 ==
Kentucky Route 557
- Location: near Sandy Hook
- Length: 2.727 mi (4.389 km)

Kentucky Route 557 (KY 557) is a 2.727-mile-long (4.389 km) state highway in Elliott County that runs from Kentucky Route 556 to Kentucky Routes 7 and 32 north of Sandy Hook.

== Kentucky Route 558 ==
Kentucky Route 558
- Location: near Snow-near Rowena
- Length: 11.656 mi (18.759 km)

Kentucky Route 558 (KY 558) is a 11.656-mile-long (18.759 km) state highway that runs from U.S. Route 127 and Old Bypassed US 127 Segment 7 Connector south of Snow to a boat dock on Lake Cumberland southeast of Rowena via Marlow, Cumberland City, and Watauga.

County	Location	mi	km	Destinations	Notes
Clinton		0.000	0.000	US 127 (Old Bypassed US 127 Segment 7 Connector)	Southern terminus
Clinton		0.357	0.575	KY 2063 east	Western terminus of KY 2063
Clinton		0.827	1.331	KY 3156	
Clinton		1.289	2.074	KY 90	
Clinton	Cumberland City	6.884	11.079	KY 829 south / Old Cumberland City-Osco Road	Northern terminus of KY 829
Clinton	Watauga	7.729	12.439	KY 3045 east (Nett Denny Road)	Western terminus of KY 3045
Russell	Lake Cumberland	11.656	18.759	Boat ramp	Northern terminus
1.000 mi = 1.609 km; 1.000 km = 0.621 mi

== Kentucky Route 559 ==
Kentucky Route 559
- Location: near Nepton-Petersville
- Length: 20.707 mi (33.325 km)

Kentucky Route 559 (KY 559) is a 20.707-mile-long (33.325 km) state highway that runs from Kentucky Route 170 northeast of Nepton to Kentucky Route 344 at Petersville via Flemingsburg and Wallingford.

County	Location	mi	km	Destinations	Notes
Fleming		0.000	0.000	KY 170 (Junction Road)	Western terminus
Fleming		3.797	6.111	KY 1200 north (Helena Road)	Southern terminus of KY 1200
Fleming		4.040	6.502	KY 11 / KY 57	
Fleming	Flemingsburg	4.502	7.245	KY 2508 north	Southern terminus of KY 2508
Fleming	Flemingsburg	4.757	7.656	KY 11 Bus. north (Maysville Road)	West end of KY 11 Bus. overlap
Fleming	Flemingsburg	5.019	8.077	KY 2504 east (North Main Street)	Western terminus of KY 2504
Fleming	Flemingsburg	5.221	8.402	KY 32 Bus. west / KY 57 Bus. (Main Cross Street)	West end of KY 32 Bus. overlap
Fleming	Flemingsburg	5.356	8.620	KY 11 Bus. south (Mt. Sterling Avenue) / KY 32 Bus. east (East Water Street)	East end of KY 11 Bus. / KY 32 Bus. overlap
Fleming	Flemingsburg	5.425	8.731	KY 2504 (East Main Street)	
Fleming		10.897	17.537	KY 3301 west (Beechburg-Wallingford Road)	Eastern terminus of KY 3301
Fleming		16.126	25.952	KY 1013 south (Muses Mill Road)	Northern terminus of KY 1013
Lewis	Petersville	20.707	33.325	KY 344	Eastern terminus
1.000 mi = 1.609 km; 1.000 km = 0.621 mi: Concurrency terminus

== Kentucky Route 560 ==
Kentucky Route 560
- Location: near Cowan-near Mays Lick
- Length: 6.521 mi (10.495 km)

Kentucky Route 560 (KY 560) is a 6.521-mile-long (10.495 km) state highway that runs from Kentucky Route 32 east of Cowan to U.S. Route 68 and East Bolden Lane southwest of Mays Lick via Ewing.

County	Location	mi	km	Destinations	Notes
Fleming		0.000	0.000	KY 32 (Elizaville Road)	Southern terminus
Fleming	Ewing	1.627	2.618	KY 165 north (Ewing Road)	South end of KY 165 overlap
Fleming	Ewing	1.837	2.956	KY 165 south (Ewing Road)	North end of KY 165 overlap
Mason		6.521	10.495	US 68 / East Bolden Lane	Northern terminus; continues as East Bolden Lane beyond US 68
1.000 mi = 1.609 km; 1.000 km = 0.621 mi: Concurrency terminus

== Kentucky Route 561 ==
Kentucky Route 561
- Location: near Flag Fork-Gest
- Length: 9.126 mi (14.687 km)

Kentucky Route 561 (KY 561) is a 9.126-mile-long (14.687 km) state highway that runs from U.S. Route 421 northwest of Flag Fork to Kentucky River Lock and Dam No. 3 and Fallis-Gest Road at Gest via Orville.

=== Major intersections ===
County	Location	mi	km	Destinations	Notes
Franklin		0.000	0.000	US 421 (Bald Knob Road)	Southern terminus
Henry		1.726	2.778	KY 573 west (Woods Pike Road)	Eastern terminus of KY 573
Henry		3.538	5.694	KY 389 north (Harpers Ferry Road)	Southern terminus of KY 389
Henry	Gest	9.126	14.687	Kentucky River Lock and Dam No. 3 / Fallis-Gest Road	Northern terminus; continues as Fallis-Gest Road beyond Kentucky River Lock and Dam No. 3
1.000 mi = 1.609 km; 1.000 km = 0.621 mi

== Kentucky Route 562 ==
Kentucky Route 562
- Location: near Napoleon
- Length: 3.044 mi (4.899 km)

Kentucky Route 562 (KY 562) is a 3.044-mile-long (4.899 km) state highway in Gallatin County that runs from Kentucky Route 16 to U.S. Routes 42 and 127 northeast of Napoleon.

=== Major intersections ===
The entire route is in Gallatin County.

Location	mi	km	Destinations	Notes
	0.000	0.000	KY 16	Southern terminus
	3.044	4.899	US 42 / US 127	Northern terminus
1.000 mi = 1.609 km; 1.000 km = 0.621 mi

== Kentucky Route 563 ==
Kentucky Route 563
- Location: near Hyattsville-near Stone
- Length: 13.882 mi (22.341 km)

Kentucky Route 563 (KY 563) is a 13.882-mile-long (22.341 km) state highway in Garrard County that runs from Kentucky Route 1295 northeast of Hyattsville to Kentucky Route 39 and Buckeye Road northeast of Stone.

=== Major intersections ===
The entire route is in Garrard County.

Location	mi	km	Destinations	Notes
	0.000	0.000	KY 1295 (Kirksville Road)	Southern terminus
	3.915	6.301	KY 39 south (Buckeye Road)	South end of KY 39 overlap
	4.930	7.934	KY 39 north (Buckeye Road)	North end of KY 39 overlap
	10.568	17.008	KY 1971 south (Leavell Ridge Road)	Northern terminus of KY 1971
	13.882	22.341	KY 39 south (Buckeye Road) / Buckeye Road	Northern terminus; northern terminus of southern segment of KY 39
1.000 mi = 1.609 km; 1.000 km = 0.621 mi: Concurrency terminus

== Kentucky Route 564 ==
Kentucky Route 564
- Location: near Tri City-near Hicksville
- Length: 14.369 mi (23.125 km)

Kentucky Route 564 (KY 564) is a 14.369-mile-long (23.125 km) state highway in Graves County that runs from Kentucky Route 94 east of Tri City to Kentucky Route 58 southeast of Hicksville via Cooksville, Farmington, and Golo.

=== Major intersections ===
The entire route is in Graves County.

Location	mi	km	Destinations	Notes
	0.000	0.000	KY 94 (Kirksville Road)	Southern terminus
Farmington	5.578	8.977	KY 121 north / Old KY 3122	South end of KY 121 overlap
	6.190	9.962	KY 121 south	North end of KY 121 overlap
	6.715	10.807	KY 80	
	8.421	13.552	KY 1124	
	9.669	15.561	KY 464	
	14.369	23.125	KY 58	Northern terminus
1.000 mi = 1.609 km; 1.000 km = 0.621 mi: Concurrency terminus

== Kentucky Route 565 ==
Kentucky Route 565
- Location: near Gresham-near Romine
- Length: 7.473 mi (12.027 km)

Kentucky Route 565 (KY 565) is a 7.473-mile-long (12.027 km) state highway that runs from Kentucky Route 61 northwest of Gresham to Kentucky Route 55 south of Romine.

=== Major intersections ===
County	Location	mi	km	Destinations	Notes
Green		0.000	0.000	KY 61 (Columbia Road)	Western terminus
Green		2.978	4.793	KY 1913 east (Haskinsville Road)	Western terminus of KY 1913
Taylor		7.473	12.027	KY 55 (New Columbia Road)	Eastern terminus
1.000 mi = 1.609 km; 1.000 km = 0.621 mi

== Kentucky Route 566 ==
Kentucky Route 566
- Location: Linwood-near Allendale
- Length: 16.644 mi (26.786 km)

Kentucky Route 566 (KY 566) is a 16.644-mile-long (26.786 km) state highway that runs from U.S. Route 31E at Linwood to Kentucky Route 61 northwest of Allendale via Eve and Hudgins.

=== Major intersections ===
County	Location	mi	km	Destinations	Notes
Hart	Linwood	0.000	0.000	US 31E (North Jackson Highway)	Southern terminus
Green	Eve	5.728	9.218	KY 323 east (Aetna Grove Church Road)	Western terminus of KY 323
Green	Hudgins	8.432	13.570	KY 569 west (Hudgins Highway)	South end of KY 569 overlap
Green		9.861	15.870	KY 569 east (Hudgins Highway)	North end of KY 569 overlap
Green		12.674	20.397	KY 936 west	Eastern terminus of KY 936
Green		16.644	26.786	KY 61 (Hodgenville Road)	Northern terminus
1.000 mi = 1.609 km; 1.000 km = 0.621 mi: Concurrency terminus

== Kentucky Route 567 ==
Kentucky Route 567
- Location: Elizabethtown-near Roanoke
- Length: 7.958 mi (12.807 km)

Kentucky Route 567 (KY 567) is a 7.958-mile-long (12.807 km) state highway in Hardin County that runs from Kentucky Route 210 in far southeastern Elizabethtown to the Larue County line northwest of Roanoke.

=== Major intersections ===
The entire route is in Hardin County.

Location	mi	km	Destinations	Notes
Elizabethtown	0.000	0.000	KY 210 (Hodgenville Road)	Western terminus
Larue County line	7.958	12.807	Gray Road	Eastern terminus; continues as Gray Road beyond county line
1.000 mi = 1.609 km; 1.000 km = 0.621 mi

== Kentucky Route 568 ==
Kentucky Route 568
- Location: Cranks
- Length: 3.268 mi (5.259 km)

Kentucky Route 568 (KY 568) is a 3.268-mile-long (5.259 km) state highway in Harlan County that runs from U.S. Route 421 at Cranks to Rhymer Hicks Cemetery Lane northeast of Cranks.

=== Major intersections ===
The entire route is in Harlan County.

Location	mi	km	Destinations	Notes
Cranks	0.000	0.000	US 421	Southern terminus
	3.268	5.259	Rhymer Hicks Cemetery Lane	Northern terminus
1.000 mi = 1.609 km; 1.000 km = 0.621 mi

== Kentucky Route 569 ==
Kentucky Route 569
- Location: near Hinesdale-near Mac
- Length: 24.174 mi (38.904 km)

Kentucky Route 569 (KY 569) is a 24.174-mile-long (38.904 km) state highway that runs from Kentucky Route 357 west of Hinesdale to Kentucky Route 210 northeast of Mac via Hinesdale, Hudgins, Lobb, Bloyds Crossing, Coakley, and Mac.

=== Major intersections ===
County	Location	mi	km	Destinations	Notes
Hart		0.000	0.000	KY 357 (Hammonsville Road)	Western terminus
Hart		2.720	4.377	KY 2185 south (Munfordville-Linwood Road)	Northern terminus of KY 2185
Hart		6.427	10.343	US 31E south (North Jackson Highway)	West end of US 31E overlap
Hart		6.677	10.746	US 31E north (North Jackson Highway)	East end of US 31E overlap
Green	Hudgins	11.419	18.377	KY 1079 north (John Goff Road)	Southern terminus of KY 1079
Green	Hudgins	11.462	18.446	KY 566 south (Eve Road)	West end of KY 566 overlap
Green		12.891	20.746	KY 566 north (Gumm Spring Road)	East end of KY 566 overlap
Green	Bloyds Crossing	18.161	29.227	KY 61 (Hodgenville Road)	
Green	Coakley	20.659	33.247	KY 2763 south (Summersville Coakley Road)	Northern terminus of KY 2763
Taylor	Mac	22.790	36.677	KY 424 west (Taylors Chapel Road) / Mac Pitman Road	Eastern terminus of KY 424
Taylor		24.174	38.904	KY 210 (Old Hodgenville Road)	Eastern terminus
1.000 mi = 1.609 km; 1.000 km = 0.621 mi: Concurrency terminus

== Kentucky Route 570 ==
Kentucky Route 570
- Location: LeGrande-near Hardyville
- Length: 5.485 mi (8.827 km)

Kentucky Route 570 (KY 570) is a 5.485-mile-long (8.827 km) state highway in Hart County that runs from Kentucky Routes 218 and 436 at LeGrande to Kentucky Route 88 southeast of Hardyville via Rex.

=== Major intersections ===
The entire route is in Hart County.

Location	mi	km	Destinations	Notes
LeGrande	0.000	0.000	KY 218 (LeGrande Highway) / KY 436 north (Hundred Acre Pond Road)	Southern terminus; southern terminus of KY 436
	5.485	8.827	KY 88 (Hardyville Road)	Northern terminus
1.000 mi = 1.609 km; 1.000 km = 0.621 mi

== Kentucky Route 571 ==
Kentucky Route 571
- Location: near Park-Woodsonville
- Length: 10.835 mi (17.437 km)

Kentucky Route 571 (KY 571) is a 10.835-mile-long (17.437 km) state highway that runs from Kentucky Route 740 southeast of Park to U.S. Route 31W in Woodsonville via Seymour and Uno.

=== Major intersections ===
County	Location	mi	km	Destinations	Notes
Barren		0.000	0.000	KY 740 (Hiseville-Park Road)	Southern terminus
Hart	Seymour	2.503	4.028	KY 218 east (LeGrande Highway)	South end of KY 218 overlap
Hart		2.947	4.743	KY 218 west (LeGrande Highway) / Seymour-Bear Wallow Road	North end of KY 218 overlap
Hart		3.455	5.560	KY 572 east (Oil Field Road)	Western terminus of KY 572
Hart	Uno	4.715	7.588	US 31E (South Jackson Highway)	
Hart	Woodsonville	10.835	17.437	US 31W (South Dixie Highway)	Northern terminus
1.000 mi = 1.609 km; 1.000 km = 0.621 mi: Concurrency terminus

== Kentucky Route 572 ==
Kentucky Route 572
- Location: near Seymour-near LeGrande
- Length: 1.645 mi (2.647 km)

Kentucky Route 572 (KY 572) is a 1.645-mile-long (2.647 km) state highway in Hart County that runs from Kentucky Route 571 northwest of Seymour to Kentucky Route 218 southwest of LeGrande.

== Kentucky Route 573 ==
Kentucky Route 573
- Location: New Castle-near Flag Fork
- Length: 13.653 mi (21.972 km)

Kentucky Route 573 (KY 573) is a 1.645-mile-long (2.647 km) state highway in Henry County that runs from U.S Route 421 and Kentucky Routes 55 and 146 in downtown New Castle to Kentucky Route 561 north of Flag Fork via Point Pleasant and Bethlehem.

=== Major intersections ===
The entire route is in Henry County.

Location	mi	km	Destinations	Notes
New Castle	0.000	0.000	US 421 / KY 55 (Main Street) / KY 146 west (West Cross Main Street)	Western terminus; eastern terminus of KY 146; continues as KY 146 beyond US 421 / KY 55
Point Pleasant	4.665	7.508	KY 3322 (Point Pleasant Road)	
	6.398	10.297	KY 22 west (Bethlehem Road)	West end of KY 22 overlap
Bethlehem	6.755	10.871	KY 22 east (Bethlehem Road) / Tommy Nelson Lane	East end of KY 22 overlap
	13.653	21.972	KY 561 (Gest Road)	Eastern terminus
1.000 mi = 1.609 km; 1.000 km = 0.621 mi: Concurrency terminus

== Kentucky Route 574 ==
Kentucky Route 574
- Location: Campbellsburg-near Port Royal
- Length: 14.000 mi (22.531 km)

Kentucky Route 574 (KY 574) is a 14-mile-long (23 km) state highway in Henry County that runs from U.S Route 421 and Kentucky Route 55 on the eastern Campbellsburg city line to Kentucky Route 389 southeast of Port Royal via Turners Station.

=== Major intersections ===
The entire route is in Henry County.

Location	mi	km	Destinations	Notes
Campbellsburg	0.000	0.000	US 421 / KY 55 (Main Street)	Western terminus
	2.253	3.626	KY 3321 east (Turners Station-Lacie Road)	Western terminus of KY 3321
	7.170	11.539	KY 193 south (Port Royal Road)	West end of KY 193 overlap
	7.220	11.619	KY 193 north (Port Royal Road)	East end of KY 193 overlap
	14.000	22.531	KY 389 (River Road)	Eastern terminus
1.000 mi = 1.609 km; 1.000 km = 0.621 mi: Concurrency terminus

== Kentucky Route 575 ==
Kentucky Route 575
- Location: near Fulgham-near Nichols
- Length: 2.436 mi (3.920 km)

Kentucky Route 575 (KY 575) is a 2.436-mile-long (3.920 km) state highway in Hickman County that runs from Kentucky Route 58 west of Fulgham to Kentucky Route 123 west of Nichols.

=== Major intersections ===
The entire route is in Hickman County.

Location	mi	km	Destinations	Notes
	0.000	0.000	KY 58	Southern terminus
	1.159	1.865	KY 1708	
	2.436	3.920	KY 123	Northern terminus
1.000 mi = 1.609 km; 1.000 km = 0.621 mi

== Kentucky Route 576 ==
Kentucky Route 576
- Location: near Moranburg-South Ripley
- Length: 6.514 mi (10.483 km)

Kentucky Route 576 (KY 576) is a 6.514-mile-long (10.483 km) state highway in Mason County that runs from Kentucky Route 3056 west of Moranburg to Kentucky Route 8 at South Ripley.

=== History ===
KY 576 was formed ca. 1962 when KY 8 was rerouted.

The original KY 576 ran from US 51 north of Fulton east to US 45; this became part of KY 94 when it was rerouted onto this road.

=== Major intersections ===
The entire route is in Mason County.

Location	mi	km	Destinations	Notes
	0.000	0.000	KY 3056 (Germantown Road)	Southern terminus
South Ripley	6.514	10.483	KY 8 (Mary Ingles Highway)	Northern terminus
1.000 mi = 1.609 km; 1.000 km = 0.621 mi

== Kentucky Route 577 ==
Kentucky Route 577
- Location: near Peoples-near Taft
- Length: 27.334 mi (43.990 km)

Kentucky Route 577 (KY 577) is a 27.334-mile-long (43.990 km) state highway that runs from Kentucky Route 3630 southeast of Peoples to Kentucky Route 11 east of Taft via Moores Creek, High Knob, Sextons Creek, and Taft.

=== Major intersections ===
County	Location	mi	km	Destinations	Notes
Jackson		0.000	0.000	KY 3630	Western terminus
Jackson		3.156	5.079	KY 30	
Jackson		5.916	9.521	KY 578 east (Green Hill Road)	West end of KY 578 overlap
Jackson		5.993	9.645	KY 578 west (Green Hill Road)	East end of KY 578 overlap
Clay		11.052	17.786	US 421 south	West end of US 421 overlap
Clay		11.827	19.034	US 421 north	East end of US 421 overlap
Jackson	No major junctions				
Clay		16.366	26.339	KY 1709 north	Southern terminus of KY 1709
Clay	Sextons Creek	18.172	29.245	KY 1350 south	West end of KY 1350 overlap
Clay		19.255	30.988	KY 1350 north	East end of KY 1350 overlap
Owsley		27.334	43.990	KY 11	Eastern terminus
1.000 mi = 1.609 km; 1.000 km = 0.621 mi: Concurrency terminus

== Kentucky Route 578 ==
Kentucky Route 578
- Location: Victory-Annville
- Length: 17.691 mi (28.471 km)

Kentucky Route 578 (KY 578) is a 17.691-mile-long (28.471 km) state highway that runs from Kentucky Route 490 at Victory to Kentucky Route 290 and Wiley Hillard Road on the northwestern edge of Annville via McWhorter, Royrader, Green Hill, and Annville.

=== Major intersections ===
County	Location	mi	km	Destinations	Notes
Laurel	Victory	0.000	0.000	KY 490	Western terminus
Laurel		3.951	6.359	KY 3630 east (Greenmount Bond Road)	Western terminus of KY 3630
Laurel		4.036	6.495	KY 30 east	West end of KY 30 overlap
Laurel		4.127	6.642	KY 30 west	East end of KY 30 overlap
Laurel		5.467	8.798	KY 638 west (McWhorter Road)	West end of KY 638 overlap
Laurel	McWhorter	6.301	10.140	KY 638 east (McWhorter Road)	East end of KY 638 overlap
Jackson		12.841	20.666	KY 577 east	West end of KY 577 overlap
Jackson		12.918	20.790	KY 577 west	East end of KY 577 overlap
Jackson		15.044	24.211	KY 30	
Jackson	Annville	16.013	25.770	KY 3630 west	West end of KY 3630 overlap
Jackson	Annville	16.186	26.049	KY 3630 east	East end of KY 3630 overlap
Jackson	Annville	17.691	28.471	KY 290 / Wiley Hillard Road	Eastern terminus; continues as Wiley Hillard Road beyond KY 290
1.000 mi = 1.609 km; 1.000 km = 0.621 mi: Concurrency terminus

== Kentucky Route 579 ==
Kentucky Route 579
- Location: Annville
- Existed: 1985

Kentucky Route 579 (KY 579) was a state highway which ran from KY 30 (now KY 3630) in Annville southeast. The road was given to Jackson County on March 21, 1985, but was restored on June 15, 1987, as KY 3444.

== Kentucky Route 580 ==
Kentucky Route 580
- Location: near Oil Springs-Barnetts Creek
- Length: 12.230 mi (19.682 km)

Kentucky Route 580 (KY 580) is a 12.230-mile-long (19.682 km) state highway that runs from Kentucky Route 490 in Johnson County that runs from U.S. Route 460 southeast of Oil Springs to Kentucky Route 40 at Barnetts Creek via Oil Springs and Manilla.

=== Major intersections ===
The entire route is in Johnson County.

Location	mi	km	Destinations	Notes
	0.000	0.000	US 460	Western terminus
	1.765	2.840	KY 40 east	West end of KY 40 overlap
Oil Springs	1.906	3.067	KY 40 west	East end of KY 40 overlap
	3.466	5.578	KY 1409 north	Southern terminus of KY 1409
	8.921	14.357	KY 2318 north	Southern terminus of KY 2318
Barnetts Creek	12.230	19.682	KY 40	Eastern terminus
1.000 mi = 1.609 km; 1.000 km = 0.621 mi: Concurrency terminus

== Kentucky Route 583 ==
Kentucky Route 583
- Location: near Lyons-Younger Creek
- Length: 8.473 mi (13.636 km)

Kentucky Route 583 (KY 583) is a 8.473-mile-long (13.636 km) state highway that runs from Kentucky Route 52 northwest of Lyons to U.S. Route 62 and Kentucky Route 61 at Younger Creek.

=== Major intersections ===
County	Location	mi	km	Destinations	Notes
Larue		0.000	0.000	KY 52 (Lyons Station Road)	Southern terminus
Hardin		6.528	10.506	Bluegrass Parkway west – Elizabethtown	Access only from KY 583 to Bluegrass Parkway west and from Bluegrass Parkway east to KY 583
Hardin	Younger Creek	8.473	13.636	US 62 / KY 61 (Bardstown Road)	Northern terminus
1.000 mi = 1.609 km; 1.000 km = 0.621 mi: Concurrency terminus

== Kentucky Route 584 ==
Kentucky Route 584
- Location: near South Buffalo-near Jericho
- Length: 3.620 mi (5.826 km)

Kentucky Route 584 (KY 584) is a 3.620-mile-long (5.826 km) state highway in Larue County that runs from Kentucky Route 61 southwest of South Buffalo to Kentucky Route 210 immediately north of Jericho via Jericho.

=== Major intersections ===
The entire route is in Larue County.

Location	mi	km	Destinations	Notes
	0.000	0.000	KY 61 (Greensburg Road)	Southern terminus
	3.620	5.826	KY 210 (Campbellsville Road)	Northern terminus
1.000 mi = 1.609 km; 1.000 km = 0.621 mi

== Kentucky Route 585 ==
Kentucky Route 585
- Location: near Franklin–near Scottsville
- Length: 17.219 mi (27.711 km)
- Existed: 1988–present

Kentucky Route 585 (KY 585) is a 17.219-mile-long (27.711 km) rural secondary highway in eastern Simpson County and western Allen County. The highway extends from Kentucky Route 73 in Franklin east to Kentucky Route 100 west of Scottsville via Gold City, Mount Aerial, and Red Hill.

=== Route description ===
KY 585 begins at KY 73 at the east city limit of Franklin; the latter highway heads west into town along Cedar Street and southeast along Rapids Road, which intersects KY 100 (Scottsville Road) just south of KY 585's terminus. KY 585 heads east along Gold City Road, which crosses over I-65 with no access and traverses Lick Creek, a tributary of the West Fork of Drakes Creek. The highway has junctions with KY 622 west of and at Gold City, the former as Hickory Flat–Gold City Road and the latter as Temperance Road. KY 585 crosses the Middle Fork of Drakes Creek at the Simpson–Allen county line. The highway continues as Old Franklin Road, which passes through Mount Aerial and crosses Hams Branch west of the route's junction with KY 1332 (Pope Road). KY 585 crosses Johns Creek and Trammel Creek on either side of Red Hill. The highway reaches its eastern terminus at KY 100 (Franklin Road) west of Scottsville.

=== History ===
The Kentucky Transportation Cabinet assigned KY 585 as a redesignation of Kentucky Route 265 (KY 265) through a pair of September 29, 1988, official orders.

The original KY 585 ran from KY 30 in Greenmount southeast and northeast to KY 638. This became part of KY 578 (which was extended west) and KY 638 (which was extended east).

Another KY 585 was formed by 1957, running from KY 1153 northeast of Lewisburg west via Coon Range Lake Road. This highway was given to Logan County on October 25, 1982.

=== Major intersections ===
County	Location	mi	km	Destinations	Notes
Simpson		0.000	0.000	KY 73 to KY 100	Western terminus
Simpson		5.673	9.130	KY 622 south (Hickory Flat-Gold City Road)	West end of KY 622 overlap
Simpson	Gold City	6.139	9.880	KY 622 north (Temperance Road)	East end of KY 622 overlap
Allen		11.356	18.276	KY 1332 east (Pope Road)	Western terminus of KY 1332
Allen		17.219	27.711	KY 100 (Franklin Road)	Eastern terminus
1.000 mi = 1.609 km; 1.000 km = 0.621 mi: Concurrency terminus

== Kentucky Route 586 ==
Kentucky Route 586
- Location: near Elkfork-near Mima
- Length: 4.613 mi (7.424 km)

Kentucky Route 586 (KY 586) is a 4.613-mile-long (7.424 km) state highway in Laurel County that runs from Kentucky Route 472 to Kentucky Route 638 around and through Maplesville.

=== Major intersections ===
The entire route is in Laurel County.

Location	mi	km	Destinations	Notes
	0.000	0.000	KY 472 (Johnson Road)	Southern terminus
	4.613	7.424	KY 638 (McWhorter Road)	Northern terminus
1.000 mi = 1.609 km; 1.000 km = 0.621 mi

== Kentucky Route 589 ==
Kentucky Route 589
- Location: near Elkfork-near Mima
- Length: 6.633 mi (10.675 km)

Kentucky Route 589 (KY 589) is a 6.633-mile-long (10.675 km) state highway in Morgan County that runs from Kentucky Route 172 southwest of Elkfork to Kentucky Route 437 north of Mima via Middle Fork.

=== History ===
KY 589 was formed by 1954.

The original KY 589 ran from KY 35 (now Bus. US 127) in Albany southwest to the Tennessee state line; this became part of KY 55 by 1954, and is now KY 738.

=== Major intersections ===
The entire route is in Morgan County.

Location	mi	km	Destinations	Notes
	0.000	0.000	KY 172	Western terminus
	6.633	10.675	KY 437	Eastern terminus
1.000 mi = 1.609 km; 1.000 km = 0.621 mi

== Kentucky Route 590 ==
Kentucky Route 590
- Location: Stanford-Hedgeville
- Length: 8.022 mi (12.910 km)

Kentucky Route 590 (KY 590) is a 8.022-mile-long (12.910 km) state highway that runs from U.S. Route 27 and Bass Avenue in northeastern Stanford to Kentucky Route 52 at Hedgeville via Hubble.

=== Major intersections ===
County	Location	mi	km	Destinations	Notes
Lincoln	Stanford	0.000	0.000	US 27 / Bass Avenue	Southern terminus; continues as Bass Avenue beyond US 27
Lincoln		3.813	6.136	KY 3248 south (Carmen Lane)	Northern terminus of KY 3248
Lincoln	Hubble	4.080	6.566	KY 3247 north (Robinson Lane)	Southern terminus of KY 3247
Lincoln		4.684	7.538	KY 1150 east (Old Danville Road)	Western terminus of KY 1150
Lincoln		5.379	8.657	KY 3247 south (Robinson Lane)	Northern terminus of KY 3247
Boyle	Hedgeville	8.022	12.910	KY 52 (Lancaster Road)	Northern terminus
1.000 mi = 1.609 km; 1.000 km = 0.621 mi

== Kentucky Route 591 ==
Kentucky Route 591
- Location: near Schley-near Providence
- Length: 16.470 mi (26.506 km)

Kentucky Route 591 (KY 591) is a 16.470-mile-long (26.506 km) state highway that runs from Kentucky Route 96 north of Schley to Kentucky Route 383 west of Providence via Schley, Adairville, and Prices Mill.

=== Major intersections ===
County	Location	mi	km	Destinations	Notes
Logan		0.000	0.000	KY 96 (Orndorff Mill Road)	Western terminus
Logan	Adairville	5.111	8.225	High Street (KY 2135)	
Logan	Adairville	5.179	8.335	Church Street (KY 3053 east / KY 2138 north)	Western terminus of KY 3053; southern terminus of KY 2138
Logan	Adairville	5.227	8.412	US 431 (Main Street)	
Logan		6.397	10.295	KY 1308 north (Trimble Road)	Southern terminus of KY 1308
Logan		9.020	14.516	KY 765 north (Conn Road)	West end of KY 765 overlap
Logan		9.544	15.360	KY 765 south (Lamont Road)	East end of KY 765 overlap
Simpson		13.606	21.897	KY 1885 east (Neosheo-Prices Mill Road)	Western terminus of KY 1885
Simpson		16.470	26.506	KY 383 (Springfield Road)	Eastern terminus
1.000 mi = 1.609 km; 1.000 km = 0.621 mi: Concurrency terminus

== Kentucky Route 592 ==
Kentucky Route 592
- Location: near Pine Knot
- Length: 4.008 mi (6.450 km)

Kentucky Route 592 (KY 592) is a 4.008-mile-long (6.450 km) state highway in McCreary County that runs to and from Kentucky Route 92 east of Pine Knot.

=== Major intersections ===
The entire route is in McCreary County.

Location	mi	km	Destinations	Notes
	0.000	0.000	KY 92 / Bob Musgrove Road	Western terminus; continues as Bob Musgrove Road beyond KY 92
	3.026	4.870	KY 1470 west (Marsh Creek Road)	West end of KY 592 overlap
	3.832	6.167	KY 1470 east (Strunk-Silversville Road)	East end of KY 1470 overlap
	4.008	6.450	KY 92	Eastern terminus
1.000 mi = 1.609 km; 1.000 km = 0.621 mi: Concurrency terminus

== Kentucky Route 593 ==
Kentucky Route 593
- Location: near Comer-near Beech Grove
- Length: 4.008 mi (6.450 km)

Kentucky Route 593 (KY 593) is a 4.008-mile-long (6.450 km) state highway in McCreary County that runs from Kentucky Route 56 south of Comer to Kentucky Route 136 and Porter School Road east of Beech Grove via Comer, Elba, and Wyman.

=== Major intersections ===
The entire route is in McLean County.

Location	mi	km	Destinations	Notes
	0.000	0.000	KY 56 / Bob Musgrove Road	Western terminus
	3.930	6.325	KY 1233 south	Northern terminus of KY 1233
	4.548	7.319	KY 258 west	West end of KY 258 overlap
	4.916	7.912	KY 258 east	East end of KY 258 overlap
Elba	6.996	11.259	KY 56	
	11.172	17.980	KY 136 / Porter School Road	Eastern terminus; continues as Porter School Road beyond KY 136
1.000 mi = 1.609 km; 1.000 km = 0.621 mi: Concurrency terminus

== Kentucky Route 594 ==
Kentucky Route 594
- Location: near Bighill-near Irvine
- Length: 22.499 mi (36.209 km)

Kentucky Route 594 (KY 594) is a 22.499-mile-long (36.209 km) state highway that runs from U.S. Route 421 north of Bighill to Kentucky Route 52 west of Irvine via Duluth and Jinks.

=== Major intersections ===
County	Location	mi	km	Destinations	Notes
Madison		0.000	0.000	US 421 (Battlefield Memorial Highway)	Western terminus
Estill		18.009	28.983	KY 3328 north (Red Lick Road)	Southern terminus of KY 3328
Estill		19.083	30.711	KY 1139 west (Crooked Creek Road)	Eastern terminus of KY 1139
Estill		19.473	31.339	KY 499 east (Wisemantown Road)	West end of KY 499 overlap
Estill		19.522	31.418	KY 499 west (Wisemantown Road)	East end of KY 499 overlap
Estill		20.259	32.604	KY 3327 north (Stacey Lane Road)	Southern terminus of KY 3327
Estill		22.499	36.209	KY 52 (Richmond Road)	Eastern terminus
1.000 mi = 1.609 km; 1.000 km = 0.621 mi: Concurrency terminus

== Kentucky Route 596 ==
Kentucky Route 596
- Location: Shannon-Germantown
- Length: 10.738 mi (17.281 km)

Kentucky Route 596 (KY 596) is a 10.738-mile-long (17.281 km) state highway that runs from U.S. Route 62 at Shannon to Kentucky Route 10 in eastern Germantown.

=== Major intersections ===
The entire route is in Mason County.

Location	mi	km	Destinations	Notes
Shannon	0.000	0.000	US 62	Southern terminus
Germantown	10.738	17.281	KY 10 / Broadway Alley	Northern terminus
1.000 mi = 1.609 km; 1.000 km = 0.621 mi

== Kentucky Route 597 ==
Kentucky Route 597
- Location: Flemingsburg-near Marshall
- Length: 9.493 mi (15.278 km)

Kentucky Route 597 (KY 597) is a 9.493-mile-long (15.278 km) state highway that runs from Kentucky Route 11 Business in northern Flemingsburg to Kentucky Route 11 southeast of Marshall via Mount Gilead.

=== Major intersections ===
County	Location	mi	km	Destinations	Notes
Fleming	Flemingsburg	0.000	0.000	KY 11 Bus. (Maysville Road)	Southern terminus
Fleming		0.873	1.405	KY 57	
Fleming		3.290	5.295	KY 3299 south (Harn Road)	Northern terminus of KY 3299
Mason	Mount Gilead	6.405	10.308	KY 1234 north (Mt. Carmel Road)	Southern terminus of KY 1234
Mason		8.143	13.105	KY 3313 (Taylor Mill Road)	
Mason		9.493	15.278	KY 11	Northern terminus
1.000 mi = 1.609 km; 1.000 km = 0.621 mi

== Kentucky Route 598 ==
Kentucky Route 598
- Location: Harrodsburg
- Length: 2.045 mi (3.291 km)

Kentucky Route 598 (KY 598) is a 9.493-mile-long (15.278 km) state highway in Mercer County that runs from Kentucky Route 1915 to U.S. Route 127 south of Harrodsburg.

== Kentucky Route 599 ==
Kentucky Route 599
- Location: near Bowen-Jeffersonville
- Length: 11.788 mi (18.971 km)

Kentucky Route 599 (KY 599) is a 11.788-mile-long (18.971 km) state highway that runs from Kentucky Route 613 north of Bowen to U.S. Route 460 in downtown Jeffersonville.

=== Major intersections ===
County	Location	mi	km	Destinations	Notes
Powell		0.000	0.000	KY 613 (North Fork Road)	Southern terminus
Powell		0.934	1.503	KY 615 west (North Bend Road)	Eastern terminus of KY 615
Powell		5.595	9.004	KY 1050 north (Lower Cane Creek Road)	Southern terminus of KY 1050
Montgomery	Jeffersonville	11.788	18.971	US 460 (Main Street)	Northern terminus
1.000 mi = 1.609 km; 1.000 km = 0.621 mi
