= Kentucky Route 436 =

State highway in Kentucky, United States

Kentucky Route 436
- Hundred Acre Pond Road
- KY 436 highlighted in red

Route information
- Maintained by KYTC
- Length: 5.638 mi (9.073 km)

Major junctions
- South end: KY 218 / KY 570 near Uno
- North end: KY 88 near Monroe

Location
- Country: United States
- State: Kentucky
- Counties: Hart

Highway system
- Kentucky State Highway System; Interstate; US; State; Parkways
← KY 435	→ KY 437

Kentucky Route 436 (KY 436) is a 5.638-mile (9.073 km) state highway in Hart County, Kentucky. It runs from Kentucky Routes 218 and 570 southeast of Uno to Kentucky Route 88 west of Monroe.

== Major intersections ==
The entire route is in Hart County.

Location	mi	km	Destinations	Notes
	0.000	0.000	KY 218 (LeGrande Highway) / KY 570 north (Rex Road)	Southern terminus; southern terminus of KY 570
	5.638	9.073	KY 88 (Hardyville Road)	Northern terminus
1.000 mi = 1.609 km; 1.000 km = 0.621 mi
