= Stoop (surname) =

Stoop is a Dutch metonymic occupational surname. A stoop (Dutch pronunciation: [stoːp]) was a name for a jug or (wine) jar and a nickname for an innkeeper or wine merchant. People with this surname include:

- Adriaan Stoop (1856–1935), Dutch oil explorer
- Adrian Stoop (1883–1957), English rugby union player and administrator
- Andre Stoop, Namibian rugby footballer
- Dirk Stoop (ca.1618–1686), a painter of the Dutch Golden Age
- Georgie Stoop (born 1988), English tennis player
- Ineke Stoop (born 1953), Dutch statistician
- Julian de Stoop (born 1980), Australian journalist
- Pieter Stoop (born 1946), Dutch abstract painter
- Rista Stoop (born 1970), South African female cricketer

== See also ==
- Stoop (disambiguation)
- Stoops (disambiguation)
