= Kentucky Route 463 =

State highway in the United States

Kentucky Route 463
- KY 463 highlighted in red

Route information
- Maintained by KYTC
- Length: 9.828 mi (15.817 km)

Major junctions
- South end: KY 160 in Gordon
- KY 510 northwest of Gordon
- North end: KY 699 near Slemp

Location
- Country: United States
- State: Kentucky
- Counties: Letcher, Perry

Highway system
- Kentucky State Highway System; Interstate; US; State; Parkways
← KY 462	→ I-464

Kentucky Route 463 (KY 463) is a 9.828-mile-long (15.817 km) state highway in the U.S. state of Kentucky. The highway connects mostly rural areas of Letcher and Perry counties with Gordon and Delphia.

== Route description ==
=== Letcher County ===
KY 463 begins at an intersection with KY 160 in Gordon, within the southwestern part of Letcher County. It travels to the northwest, paralleling Line Fork, and leaves the fork. The highway intersects the eastern terminus of KY 510 and begins paralleling Trace Branch. It curves to the north-northwest. It curves to the northwest and crosses over the branch. It then gradually curves back to the north-northwest and then to the west-southwest. Then, the highway enters Perry County.

=== Perry County ===
KY 463 curves to the north-northwest and then begins paralleling Blair Fork. It travels through Delphia. It begins paralleling Leatherwood Creek and then crosses over the creek and Stony Fork. It curves to the north-northeast and crosses over Lynn Fork. It then travels under a railroad bridge and crosses over Leatherwood Creek before meeting its northern terminus, an intersection with KY 699 (Bridge Road).

== Major intersections ==
County	Location	mi	km	Destinations	Notes
Letcher	Gordon	0.000	0.000	KY 160 – Cumberland, Lilley Cornett Woods	Southern terminus
Letcher		0.637	1.025	KY 510 west	Eastern terminus of KY 510
Perry		9.828	15.817	KY 699 (Bridge Road) – Wooton, Hazard	Northern terminus
1.000 mi = 1.609 km; 1.000 km = 0.621 mi
