= Little Rock, Kentucky =

Unincorporated community in Kentucky, United States

- Unincorporated community
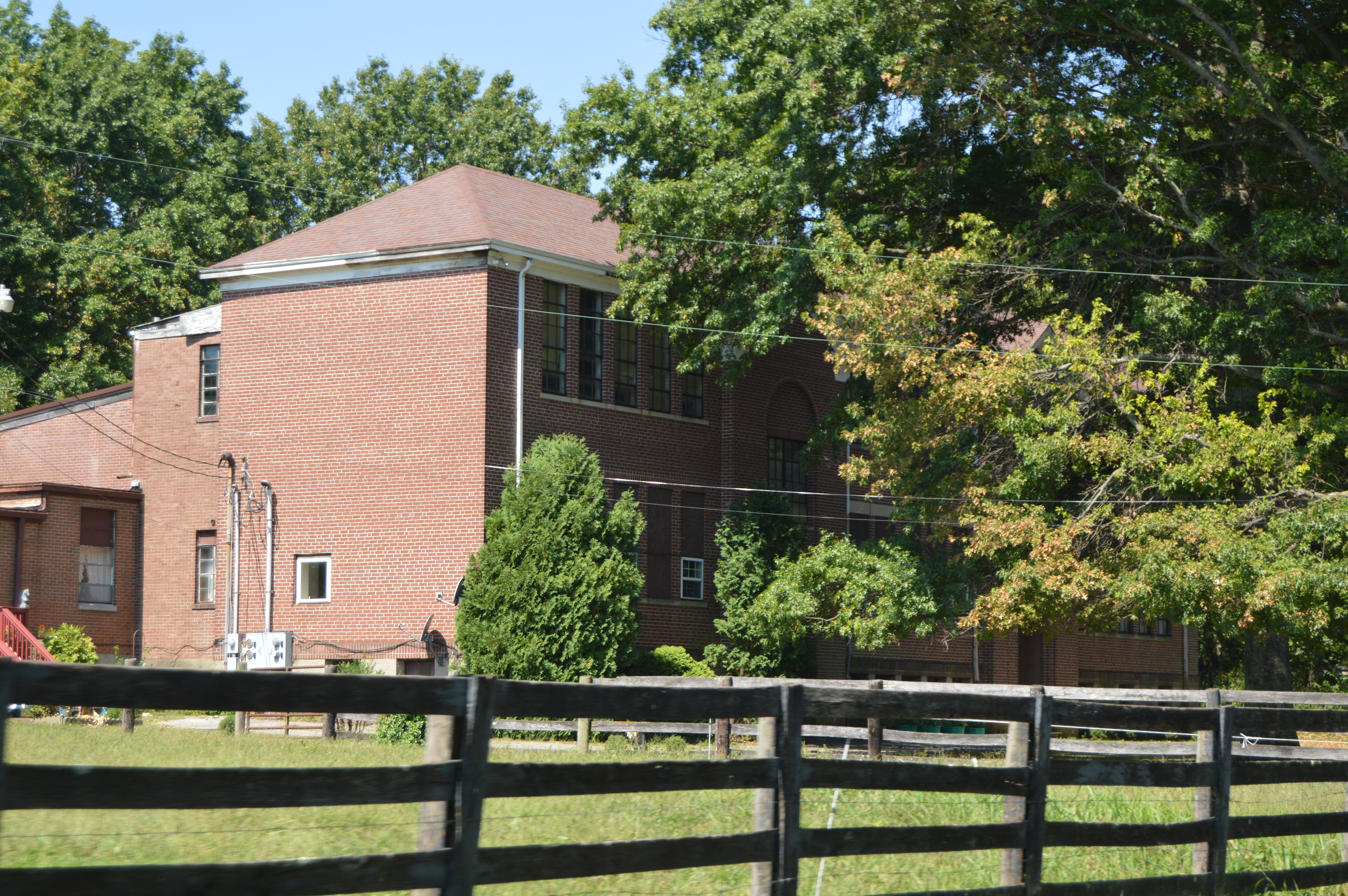
- Former community school

- Location within Kentucky
- Coordinates: 38°11′38″N 84°03′04″W
- Country: United States
- State: Kentucky
- County: Bourbon
- Elevation: 860 ft (260 m)
- Time zone: UTC-5 (Eastern (EST))
  - Summer (DST): UTC-4 (EDT)
- Area code: 859
- GNIS feature ID: 496843

Little Rock is an unincorporated community in Bourbon County, Kentucky, United States. Little Rock is located on Kentucky Route 537 11 miles (18 km) east of Paris. Originally known as Flat Rock, the town was later renamed Little Rock (to distinguish it from Flat Rock communities in Caldwell County, Kentucky and McCreary County, Kentucky.

The town name was derived from the abundant local limestone which can be seen as a construction element in numerous fences and buildings in the area. The Flat Rock post office operated from 1829 until 1873, when it was moved to nearby Plum, Kentucky. The Little Rock post office operated from 1882 to 1906.
