= Watauga =

Watauga can refer to:

Places

- Watauga, Kentucky
- Watauga County, North Carolina
- Watauga, South Dakota
- Watauga, Tennessee
- Watauga, Texas

Bodies of Water

- Watauga Lake in Tennessee
- The Watauga River in North Carolina and Tennessee

Ships

- USS Watauga (1864), a steam frigate planned for the United States Navy during the American Civil War that was never built

Other

- The Watauga Association, a pre-revolutionary autonomous American government
- The Watauga Democrat, a newspaper published in Boone, North Carolina
- Watauga College, a residential college at Appalachian State University in Boone, North Carolina
- The Watauga Dam, on the Watauga and Elk Rivers in Carter County, Tennessee
