= Melvin Traylor =

Melvin Traylor may refer to:

- Melvin Alvah Traylor (1878–1934), American banker
- Melvin Alvah Traylor Jr. (1915–2008), his son, American ornithologist
