= Breeding, Kentucky =

Unincorporated community in Kentucky, United States

Breeding
- Unincorporated community
- Location within the state of Kentucky Breeding (the United States)
- Coordinates: 36°57′33″N 85°26′4″W
- Country: United States
- State: Kentucky
- County: Adair
- Elevation: 1,001 ft (305 m)
- Time zone: UTC-6 (Central (CST))
  - Summer (DST): UTC-5 (CDT)
- ZIP code: 42715
- Area codes: 270 and 364
- GNIS feature ID: 487855

Breeding is an unincorporated community in Adair County, Kentucky, United States. Its elevation is 1001 feet (305 m). It is located at the northern terminus of Kentucky Route 533.

== History ==
On July 13, 2015, an EF0 tornado struck Breeding. The narrow tornado destroyed an outbuilding and uprooted several trees.

== Notable people ==
Melvin Alvah Traylor, lawyer and banker.
