= Gold City, Kentucky =

Unincorporated community in Kentucky, United States

Gold City
- Unincorporated community
- Location within the state of Kentucky Gold City (the United States)
- Coordinates: 36°45′16″N 86°26′51″W
- Country: United States
- State: Kentucky
- County: Simpson
- Elevation: 722 ft (220 m)
- Time zone: UTC-6 (Central (CST))
  - Summer (DST): UTC-5 (CDT)
- ZIP codes: 42134
- GNIS feature ID: 508107

Gold City is an unincorporated community in Simpson County, Kentucky, United States. It lies along Route 585 northeast of the city of Franklin, the county seat of Simpson County. Its elevation is 722 feet (220 m).

The origin of the name Gold City goes back to an incident when residents were digging a well. Rocks thought to be containing gold turned out to be in fact worthless. A post office was established in the community in 1886.
