= Ozark, Kentucky =

Unincorporated community in Kentucky, United States

Ozark
- Unincorporated community
- Location within the state of Kentucky Ozark (the United States)
- Coordinates: 37°4′45″N 85°13′53″W
- Country: United States
- State: Kentucky
- County: Adair
- Elevation: 883 ft (269 m)
- Time zone: UTC-6 (Central (CST))
  - Summer (DST): UTC-5 (CDT)
- GNIS feature ID: 508769

Ozark is an unincorporated community in Adair County, Kentucky, United States located along the Louie B Nunn Cumberland Parkway on Kentucky Route 531 and Kentucky Route 80, east of Columbia. Its elevation is 883 feet (269m).
