= Olaton, Kentucky =

Unincorporated community in Kentucky, United States

- Unincorporated community
- Location within Kentucky Location within the United States
- Coordinates: 37°31′33″N 86°41′15″W
- Country: United States
- State: Kentucky
- County: Ohio
- Elevation: 423 ft (129 m)
- Time zone: UTC-6 (Central (CST))
  - Summer (DST): UTC-5 (CDT)
- ZIP code: 42361
- Area codes: 270 & 364
- GNIS feature ID: 508740

Olaton is an unincorporated community in Ohio County, Kentucky, United States. The community is located at the intersection of Kentucky Route 505 and Kentucky Route 878, 13.2 miles (21.2 km) east-northeast of Hartford. Olaton had a post office from July 18, 1883, until August 6, 2005; it still has its own ZIP code, 42361.
