= Cedar Springs, Kentucky =

Unincorporated community in Kentucky, United States

Cedar Springs
- Unincorporated community
- Location within the state of Kentucky Cedar Springs (the United States)
- Coordinates: 36°49′51″N 86°06′24″W
- Country: United States
- State: Kentucky
- County: Allen
- Elevation: 712 ft (217 m)
- Time zone: UTC−6 (CST)
  - Summer (DST): UTC−5 (CDT)
- ZIP codes: 42164
- GNIS feature ID: 507678

Cedar Springs is a rural unincorporated community in northeast Allen County, Kentucky, United States.

== Geography ==
The community is located near the intersection of U.S. Route 31E and Kentucky Route 252. Kentucky Route 517 runs from the latter route to Bailey Point Road and Hix Road northeast of Cedar Springs. It lies along the shore of Barren River Lake.

== Notable person ==
George Henry Cram, a colonel in the Union Army during the American Civil War, has a Grand Army of the Republic post in the community named in his honor.
