= Kentucky Route 218 =

State highway in Kentucky, United States

Kentucky Route 218
- KY 218 highlighted in red

Route information
- Maintained by KYTC
- Length: 31.113 mi (50.072 km)

Major junctions
- West end: Flint Ridge Road / Mammoth Cave Park Road at Davis Williams Road in Northtown
- I-65 near Horse Cave US 31W in Horse Cave; US 31E at Wigwam; KY 677 near LeGrande KY 314 near Shady Grove (Metcalfe County)
- East end: US 68 / KY 70 near Exie

Location
- Country: United States
- State: Kentucky
- Counties: Hart, Metcalfe, Green

Highway system
- Kentucky State Highway System; Interstate; US; State; Parkways
← KY 217	→ KY 219

Kentucky Route 218 (KY 218) is a 31.113-mile-long (50.072 km) west-east state highway that traverses three counties in south-central Kentucky. It is locally known as LeGrande Highway from Horse Cave to near Shady Grove.

== Route description ==
=== Hart County ===
Kentucky Route 218 begins at the unincorporated Hart County community of Northtown west of Interstate 65 (I-65). It is the beginning of state maintenance as the main road west of Northtown is actually a locally maintained road (Flint Ridge Road) that leads to the Mammoth Cave National Park, and would provide a direct route to the park's visitor center in Edmonson County. The official road maps issued by the KYTC do not show this section of KY 218 as its western terminus is intersecting locally maintained roads, which are not shown on any highway maps outside of city insets.

It crosses I-65 at its Exit 58 interchange, and enters the town of Horse Cave, which is part of a tourism hotbed in southern Kentucky due to its proximity to the national park. After running concurrently with Kentucky Route 335 for a couple of miles, it crosses U.S. Route 31W (Dixie Highway). About 5 miles (8.0 km) east of downtown Horse Cave, it crosses U.S. Route 31E (Jackson Highway), and then continues eastward to LeGrande, and enters the northernmost section of Metcalfe County a moment after the KY 677 junction.

=== Metcalfe and Green Counties ===
KY 218 goes through a small sliver of the northernmost portion of Metcalfe County, and it intersects KY 314 while doing so. It enters Green County, crosses the Little Barren River, and reaches its end at Exie, where it meets the intersection with US 68 during that route's concurrency with Kentucky Route 70 from Sulphur Well all the way to Greensburg and Campbellsville.

== History ==
KY 218 between US 31W and US 31E was formerly a portion of US 68 until that U.S. Highway was rerouted to its current alignment in the 1940s.

By 1973, KY 218 was extended west from KY 335 in Horse Cave to its current western terminus in Northtown; this segment, along with Flint Ridge Road going westward towards Mammoth Cave National Park, was originally signed as KY 474 from 1965 until 1973.

== Points of interest along the route ==
- Kentucky Down Under & Kentucky Caverns, Horse Cave
- Hidden River Cave / American Cave Museum, downtown Horse Cave
- Wigwam Roadside Store

== Major intersections ==
County	Location	mi	km	Destinations	Notes
Hart	Northtown	0.000	0.000	Davis Williams Road north / Mammoth Cave Park Road (Flint Ridge Road) west	Western terminus; continuation as Flint Ridge Road (Mammoth Cave Park Road); Beginning of State Maintenance
Hart	Horse Cave	5.211	8.386	I-65 south – Nashville	Exit 58 off I-65 SB and on-ramp to I-65 SB
Hart	Horse Cave	5.267	8.476	I-65 north – Louisville	Exit 58 off I-65 NB and on-ramp to I-65 NB
Hart	Horse Cave	5.423	8.727	KY 335 north (L and N Turnpike Road) to US 31W north – Rowletts	Western end of KY 335 concurrency
Hart	Horse Cave	7.245	11.660	KY 335 south (Old Dixie Highway) – Cave City	Eastern end of KY 335 concurrency
Hart	Horse Cave	7.64	12.30	US 31W (Dixie Street) – Munfordville, Cave City	
Hart	Horse Cave	8.431	13.568	KY 1846 (Short Cut Road)	
Hart		9.241	14.872	KY 1141 south (Bear Wallow Road)	Northern terminus of KY 1141
Hart	Wigwam	11.528	18.553	US 31E (Jackson Highway) – Hodgenville, Hardyville, Glasgow	
Hart		13.099	21.081	KY 571 north (Lonoke Road)	Western end of KY 571 concurrency
Hart	Seymour	13.543	21.795	KY 571 south (Seymour Park Road)	Eastern end of KY 571 concurrency
Hart		14.554	23.422	KY 572 west (Oil Field Road)	Western end of KY 572
Hart	LeGrande	15.045	24.213	KY 570 north (Rex Road) / KY 436 east (Hundred Acre Pond Road)	Southern terminus of KY 570; western terminus of KY 436
Hart		17.295	27.834	KY 677 south (Hiseville Park Road) to KY 740 – Hiseville	Western end of KY 677 concurrency
Hart		17.691	28.471	KY 677 north (Three Springs Road)	Eastern end of KY 677 concurrency
Metcalfe		19.368	31.170	KY 1243 south (Atwell Road)	Northern terminus of KY 1243
Metcalfe		20.98	33.76	KY 314 west (Center Peggyville Road) – Center	Eastern terminus of KY 314
Green		21.947	35.320	KY 1048 west	Eastern terminus of KY 1048
Green		24.770	39.863	KY 729 south (Little Barren Road)	Northern terminus of KY 729
Green	Pierce	26.635	42.865	KY 1464 north	Southern terminus of KY 1464
Green	Exie	31.113	50.072	US 68 (Edmonton Road) / KY 70 – Greensburg, Edmonton	Eastern terminus
1.000 mi = 1.609 km; 1.000 km = 0.621 mi: Concurrency terminus

== Flint Ridge Road ==
Flint Ridge Road
- Location: Mammoth Cave Visitors Center to Horse Cave

Flint Ridge Road is an east–west local road that connects the Mammoth Cave National Park Visitor Center directly to Horse Cave. It traverses eastern segments of Mammoth Cave National Park, which is in eastern Edmonson County, along with southwestern Hart County. It begins at an intersection with the Mammoth Cave Parkway near the park's Visitor Center and ends at the I-65 exit 58 interchange with KY 218. The final 5 1/4 miles (8.4 km) of the road is actually part of KY 218.

Points of interest along Flint Ridge Road include the Mammoth Cave Baptist Church and Cemetery, and the Dennison Ferry Day-use area.

Flint Ridge Road between Mammoth Cave Parkway and Park Ridge Road is usually closed to traffic during winter months.
