= Craycraft, Kentucky =

Unincorporated community in Kentucky, United States

Craycraft
- Unincorporated community
- Location within the state of Kentucky Craycraft (the United States)
- Coordinates: 37°5′38″N 85°12′10″W
- Country: United States
- State: Kentucky
- County: Adair
- Elevation: 948 ft (289 m)
- Time zone: UTC-6 (Central (CST))
  - Summer (DST): UTC-5 (CDT)
- GNIS feature ID: 507775

Craycraft is an unincorporated community in Adair County, Kentucky, United States. Its elevation is 948 feet (289 m). It is on Kentucky Route 206 at the northern terminus of Kentucky Route 531. It was said to have been named for Charles Craycraft, a local farmer.
