= Stoop =

Stoop may refer to:

- Stoop (surname)
- Stoop (architecture), a small staircase leading to the entrance of a building
- Partial squatting, but with unhealthy bending at the waist and little or no bending of the knees.
- Twickenham Stoop, also known simply as "The Stoop", a rugby stadium in London named after Adrian Stoop
- The Stoop (album), a music album by Little Jackie
- Stevenage Outer Orbital Path (STOOP)

== See also ==
- Stoops (disambiguation)
- Stoup
- Stoupe the Enemy of Mankind, a hip-hop DJ and member of Jedi Mind Tricks
