= Stoops =

Stoops may refer to:

== People ==
- A family of American football players and coaches:
  - Bob Stoops (born 1960), former head coach at the University of Oklahoma
  - Mark Stoops (born 1967), head coach at the University of Kentucky
  - Mike Stoops (born 1961), former defensive coordinator at the University of Oklahoma
  - Drake Stoops (born 1999), wide receiver at the University of Oklahoma, son of Bob
- Jim Stoops (born 1972), American baseball pitcher
- Mark Stoops (Indiana), American politician

== Other uses ==
- 22594 Stoops, a main-belt asteroid
- Stoops, Kentucky, an unincorporated community
- Stoops Hotel, a historic tavern and hotel in Battenville, New York

== See also ==
- Stoop (disambiguation)
