= Red Hill, Allen County, Kentucky =

Unincorporated community in Kentucky, United States

Red Hill, Kentucky
- Unincorporated community
- Location within Kentucky
- Coordinates: 36°44′28″N 86°17′57″W
- Country: United States
- State: Kentucky
- County: Allen
- Elevation: 640 ft (200 m)
- Time zone: UTC-6 (Central (CST))
  - Summer (DST): UTC-5 (CDT)
- GNIS feature ID: 508910

Red Hill is an unincorporated community in southern Allen County, Kentucky, United States. The community is located on Kentucky Route 585, which crosses Johns Creek and Trammel Creek.
