= Cranks, Kentucky =

Unincorporated community in Kentucky, United States

- Unincorporated community
- Location within Kentucky Location within the United States
- Coordinates: 36°45′53″N 83°10′20″W
- Country: United States
- State: Kentucky
- County: Harlan
- Elevation: 1,467 ft (447 m)
- Time zone: UTC-4 (Eastern (EST))
  - Summer (DST): UTC-4 (EST)
- ZIP codes: 40820
- GNIS feature ID: 490292

Cranks is an unincorporated community in southeastern Harlan County, Kentucky, United States, near the Virginia state line. Elevation ranges from 1,683 to 2,933 feet (513 to 894 m) above sea level. U.S. Route 421 is the main route of travel through this community.

Cranks is the home of Cranks Creek Lake on the Martins Fork of the Cumberland River and is used for recreation purposes. Construction was completed in 1963. It has a normal surface area of 219 acres (89 ha). Species present in the lake include rainbow trout, largemouth bass, smallmouth bass, spotted bass, bluegill, and channel catfish. Boating is allowed, but idle speed only on boats over 10 horsepower.

Cranks Creek is also home to the Cranks Creek Wildlife Management Area and the Stone Mountain Wildlife Management Area. Stone Mountain includes the unique wagon road, a hand-built road and tunnel that allowed those living on the Cranks Creek side of Stone Mountain to access the railroad line on the Virginia side.

== See also ==
- Appalachia
