= Fonde, Kentucky =

Unincorporated community in Kentucky, United States

- Unincorporated community
- Location within Kentucky
- Coordinates: 36°35′39″N 83°52′39″W
- Country: United States
- State: Kentucky
- County: Bell
- Elevation: 1,362 ft (415 m)
- Time zone: UTC-5 (Eastern (EST))
  - Summer (DST): UTC-4 (EDT)
- Area code: 606
- GNIS feature ID: 492295

Fonde is an unincorporated community in Bell County, Kentucky. Fonde is located on Kentucky Route 535 9.1 miles (14.6 km) west of Middlesboro.
