= Northtown, Kentucky =

Unincorporated community in Kentucky, United States

- Unincorporated community
- Location within Kentucky Location within the United States
- Coordinates: 37°12′51″N 86°00′03″W
- Country: United States
- State: Kentucky
- County: Hart
- Elevation: 837 ft (255 m)
- Time zone: UTC-6 (Central (CST))
  - Summer (DST): UTC-5 (CST)
- ZIP codes: 42749
- Area codes: 270 and 364

Northtown is an unincorporated community in Hart County, Kentucky, United States. The elevation of Northtown is 837 feet. It appears on the Mammoth Cave U.S. Geological Survey Map and is in the Central Time Zone.

== Geography ==
Northtown is located in the southwestern portion of Hart County at the junction of Kentucky Route 218 (KY 218) Flint Ridge Road, and Davis Williams Road, which marks KY 218's western terminus. Flint Ridge Road leads west to Mammoth Cave National Park and the Edmonson County line, while KY 218 leads east to the city of Horse Cave, where I-65 provides direct access to the community via the Exit 58 interchange.

== Education ==
Students in Northtown attend Caverna Independent Schools in nearby Horse Cave and Cave City, including Caverna High School.
