= Mount Aerial, Kentucky =

Unincorporated community in Kentucky, United States

Mount Aerial
- Unincorporated community
- Location within the state of Kentucky Mount Aerial (the United States)
- Coordinates: 36°45′12″N 86°23′34″W
- Country: United States
- State: Kentucky
- County: Allen
- Elevation: 689 ft (210 m)
- Time zone: UTC−6 (CST)
  - Summer (DST): UTC−5 (CDT)
- ZIP codes: 42164
- GNIS feature ID: 508638

Mount Aerial is a rural unincorporated community in western Allen County, Kentucky, United States. The community is located on Kentucky Route 585, as Old Franklin Road, which crosses Hams Branch west of the route's junction with Kentucky Route 1332 (Pope Road).

== History ==
On June 21, 2019, an EF1 tornado struck the community. Numerous trees were snapped or uprooted. A well-built barn was uplifted and removed from its foundation. Corn was flattened and twisted. Large, heavy fuel tanks were rolled in two different directions. Several barns and outbuildings suffered roof damage.
