= Napoleon, Kentucky =

Unincorporated community in Kentucky, United States

- Unincorporated community
- Location within the state of Kentucky Napoleon (the United States)
- Coordinates: 38°45′37″N 84°47′20″W
- Country: United States
- State: Kentucky
- County: Gallatin
- Elevation: 850 ft (260 m)
- Time zone: UTC-6 (Central (CST))
  - Summer (DST): UTC-5 (CST)
- GNIS feature ID: 499169

Napoleon is an unincorporated community located in Gallatin County, Kentucky, United States.

== History ==
Napoleon was laid out in the early 1820s and named for Napoléon Bonaparte. In the 1870s, business enterprises in Napoleon included a sawmill and gristmill, a tavern, and 3 stores. The Napoleon post office was discontinued in 1912.
