= Melvin Alvah Traylor =

American banker

- Traylor's appearance on the November 21, 1932 edition of Time Magazine
- Born: October 19, 1878; Breeding, Kentucky
- Died: February 14, 1934 (aged 55); Chicago, Illinois
- Known for: President of the American Bankers' Association
- Spouse: Dorthy Arnold Yerby (m. 1906)
- Children: 2

Melvin Alvah Traylor (1878 – 1934) was an American lawyer and banker who became president of the First Union Trust and Savings Bank in 1928, which would go on to become Chicago's largest bank during his time, and became president of the American Bankers' Association.

== Early life and education ==
He was born on October 19, 1878, in Breeding, Kentucky. He was the eldest of seven children of James Milton Traylor and Kitty Frances Traylor née Harvey.

== Career ==
He was admitted to the bar in Hillsboro, Texas, in 1901 and entered banking in 1908 when he became vice president of the Citizens National Bank of Ballinger. The bank merged with the Ballinger First National Bank in 1909 with Traylor becoming its president. He went on to oversee several banks around the United States and became president of the American Bankers Association in 1926 and later the first president of the First Union Trust and Savings Bank in 1928 which would go on to become Chicago's largest bank under his leadership in 1931. He was a strong proponent of a world bank and was a part of the American delegation to the conference that set up the Bank of International Settlements.

He spoke out on the financial causes of the Great Depression and gained national attention, appearing on the cover of Time Magazine on November 21, 1932. He was considered a possible Democratic candidate for president in 1932 but he did not pursue this candidacy, though he received approximately 40 votes on each of the first three ballots at the convention.

He served as president of the American Bankers' Association, president of the Shedd Aquarium Society, and trustee of the Newberry Library, Northwestern University, and of Berea College.

== Personal life ==
He married Dorthy Arnold Yerby on 8 June 1906 and they were parents of Melvin Alvah Traylor Jr. and Nancy Frances Traylor.

== Death ==
He died after a long battle with pneumonia on February 14, 1934, in Chicago, Cook Co. Illinois.

Traylor died February 14, 1934, in Chicago, Illinois.

== Sources ==
- TSHA Online – Texas State Historical Association – Home at www.tshaonline.org
