= Pieter Stoop =

Dutch painter (born 1946)

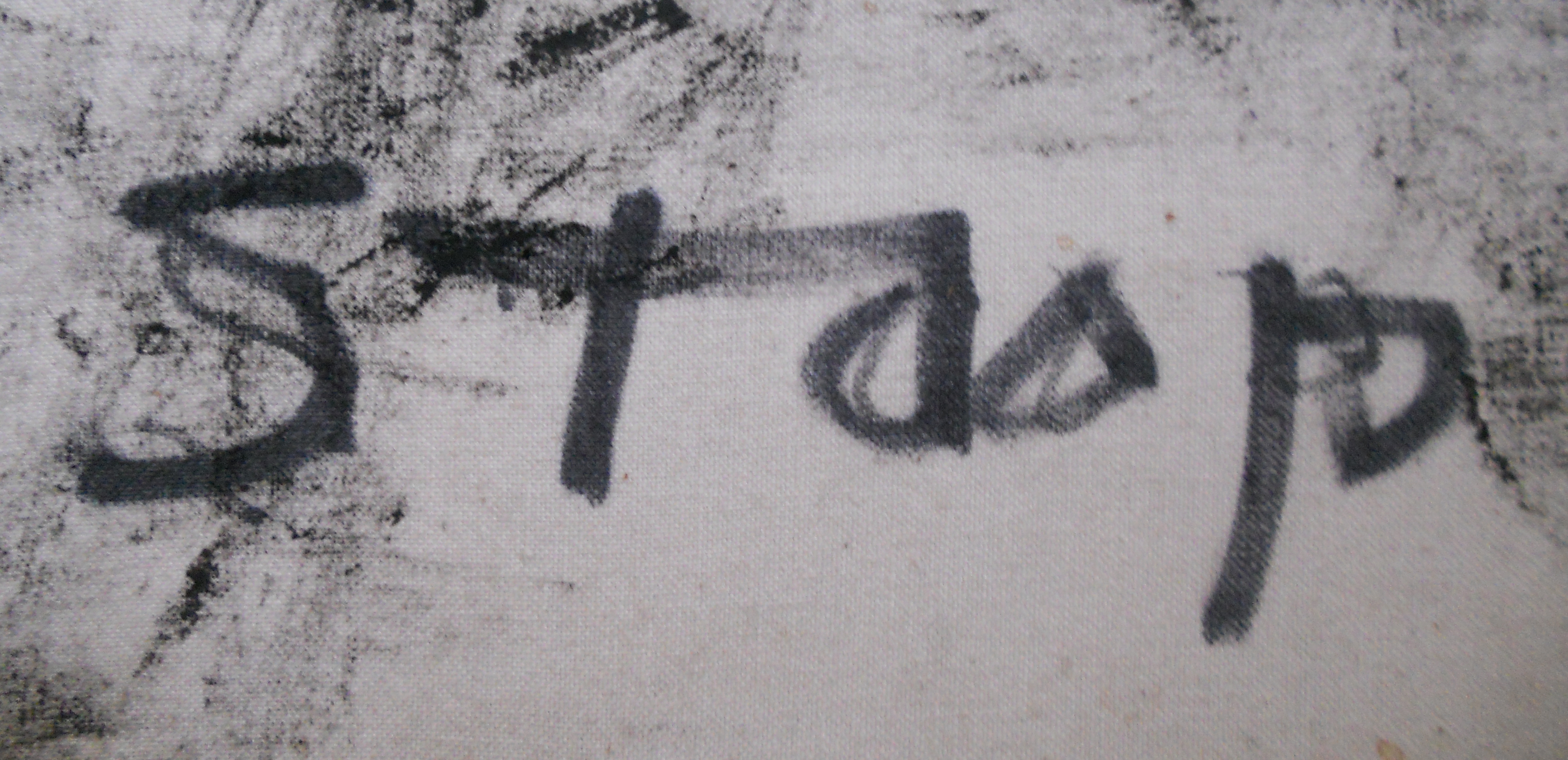
- Signature of Pieter Stoop 1983
- Born: 18 January 1946 (age 80); Breda, Netherlands
- Education: Academy of Catholic Education, Jan van Eyck Academy
- Known for: Painting
- Awards: Winner – Prize for the Visual Arts of the city of Maastricht; 1972

Pieter Stoop is a Dutch painter of abstract paintings.

Pieter Stoop attended the Academy of Catholic Education, Tilburg (1962–1966) and at the Jan van Eyck Academy of Maastricht (1966–1972). At the end of his studies he obtained the Prize for the Visual Arts of the city of Maastricht (1972), and later on he received financial support to travel to Morocco (prins Bernhard Fonds, 1974), and to New York City and Mexico (travel grant CRM, 1979) for study. Stoop specializes in painting and sculpture and identifies with the “Nieuwe Schilderijen” school. This school conceived art according exclusively to its materiality. Stoop focused on the painting materials and applied them thickly layer after layer to achieve a thick quality on the canvas.

“The essence is not that Pieter Stoop takes the landscape as his starting point; what matters is how the movement of paint and colour transforms the surface into something else: the painter’s art. Pieter Stoop makes beautifully modulated paintings.” R. H. Fuchs

He works on large canvases which are dealt with through a process that brings the artist to alternate oil painting with small-format drawings and acrylic paintings to make a quick sketch. Pieter Stoop currently lives in Eindhoven.

== Studies ==
1962-1966 Academy of Fine Art, Tilburg, Netherlands. 1966-1972 Jan van Eyck-Academy, Maastricht, Netherlands.

== Museum collections ==
- Stedelijk Museum, Amsterdam
- Van Abbemuseum, Eindhoven
- Centraal Museum, Utrecht

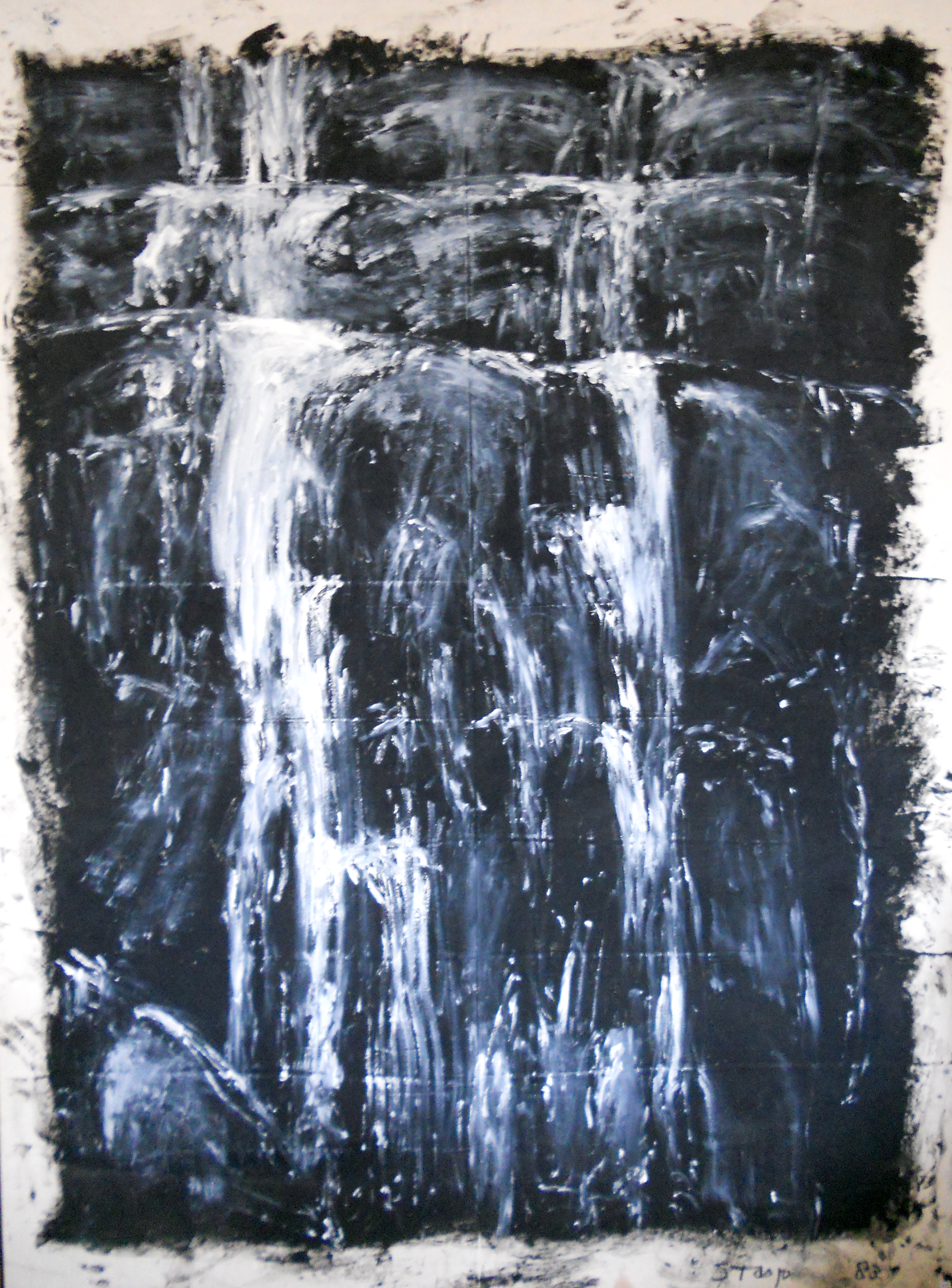
Without Title, 1983, Oil on Canvas, Size 210cm x 155cm.
