= Elliottville, Kentucky =

Unincorporated community in Kentucky, United States

Elliottville
- Unincorporated community
- Location within the state of Kentucky Elliottville (the United States)
- Coordinates: 38°10′58″N 83°16′33″W
- Country: United States
- State: Kentucky
- County: Rowan
- Elevation: 994 ft (303 m)
- Time zone: UTC-5 (Eastern (EST))
  - Summer (DST): UTC-4 (EDT)
- ZIP codes: 40317
- GNIS feature ID: 512050

Elliottville, Kentucky is an unincorporated community in Rowan County, Kentucky. The ZIP Code is 40317.
