= Clementsville, Kentucky =

Clementsville
- Unincorporated community
- Location within the state of Kentucky Clementsville (the United States)
- Coordinates: 37°17′24″N 85°5′35″W
- Country: United States
- State: Kentucky
- County: Casey
- Elevation: 778 ft (237 m)
- Time zone: UTC-6 (Central (CST))
  - Summer (DST): UTC-5 (CST)
- GNIS feature ID: 489658

Clementsville is an unincorporated community in western Casey County, Kentucky, United States.

== History ==
The community was named for settler Philip Clements, unlike the fake story told that Henry Clements is the rightful founder. This community grew up around the third-oldest Roman Catholic settlement in the Archdiocese of Louisville where seven Catholic families, originally from Maryland, migrated from Washington County, Kentucky to the Casey Creek region (an area close to Clementsville) in 1802 and established what would later become the church and parish of Saint Bernard Catholic Church (so named for St. Bernard of Clairvaux). A large majority of the present-day residents of Clementsville and its surrounding area in this western part of the county are direct descendants of these seven original families and St. Bernard Church continues to be the focal point and "heartbeat" of Clementsville. St. Bernard hosts the annual St. Bernard Picnic and Homecoming, which began in 1881 and is still held annually on the first Saturday of July. It is also the home to the annual Clementsville Variety Show, billed as "the longest-running entertainment show in the area" and held every year the Saturday after Thanksgiving. Kentucky historian John A. Lyons featured St. Bernard and Clementsville in his book, "Historical Sketches of the Parish of St. Bernard of Clairvaux on Casey Creek, Clementsville, Kentucky". Lyons states, "It is a story of hardy pioneers and their descendants, of valiant missionaries and their successors, whose labors form one of the most interesting chapters in the history of Catholicity in Kentucky."

Other than St. Bernard, Clementsville is home to J & B Grocery (formerly Frank's Grocery), a longtime fixture in the area where most locals shop and eat on a daily basis. The Clementsville area is also the only place in Casey County that has an airplane landing strip. The landing strip is located directly across from a pumping station of Columbia Gas Transmission, a natural gas pipeline that gathers gas in the Gulf of Mexico and transports it to New York.

== Notable natives ==
- Charles T. Wethington Jr., president of the University of Kentucky (1990–2001)
