= Bethlehem, Kentucky =

Town in Kentucky, United States

Coordinates: 38°24′02″N 85°04′10″W

Bethlehem is an unincorporated community in Henry County, Kentucky, United States. This rural community, formerly known as Mobley Stand, is centered at the intersection of Kentucky Highways 22 and 573. Bethlehem is best known for its annual Living Nativity, celebrated on December 22–25 from 6:30–9:00 pm. The event is a collaborative effort of three local Christian churches (Bethlehem Baptist, Bethlehem Methodist, and Point Pleasant Christian). The Bethlehem post office (ZIP code 40007) offers a special postmark during the Christmas season. Each December, people from many surrounding communities, and occasionally from other states, bring their holiday cards to receive the Bethlehem postmark. In 1996, a segment of the CBS Evening News featured Bethlehem's Christmas traditions. Local and national television and periodicals have also covered this community tradition.
