= Cunningham, Kentucky =

Unincorporated community in Kentucky, United States

- Unincorporated community
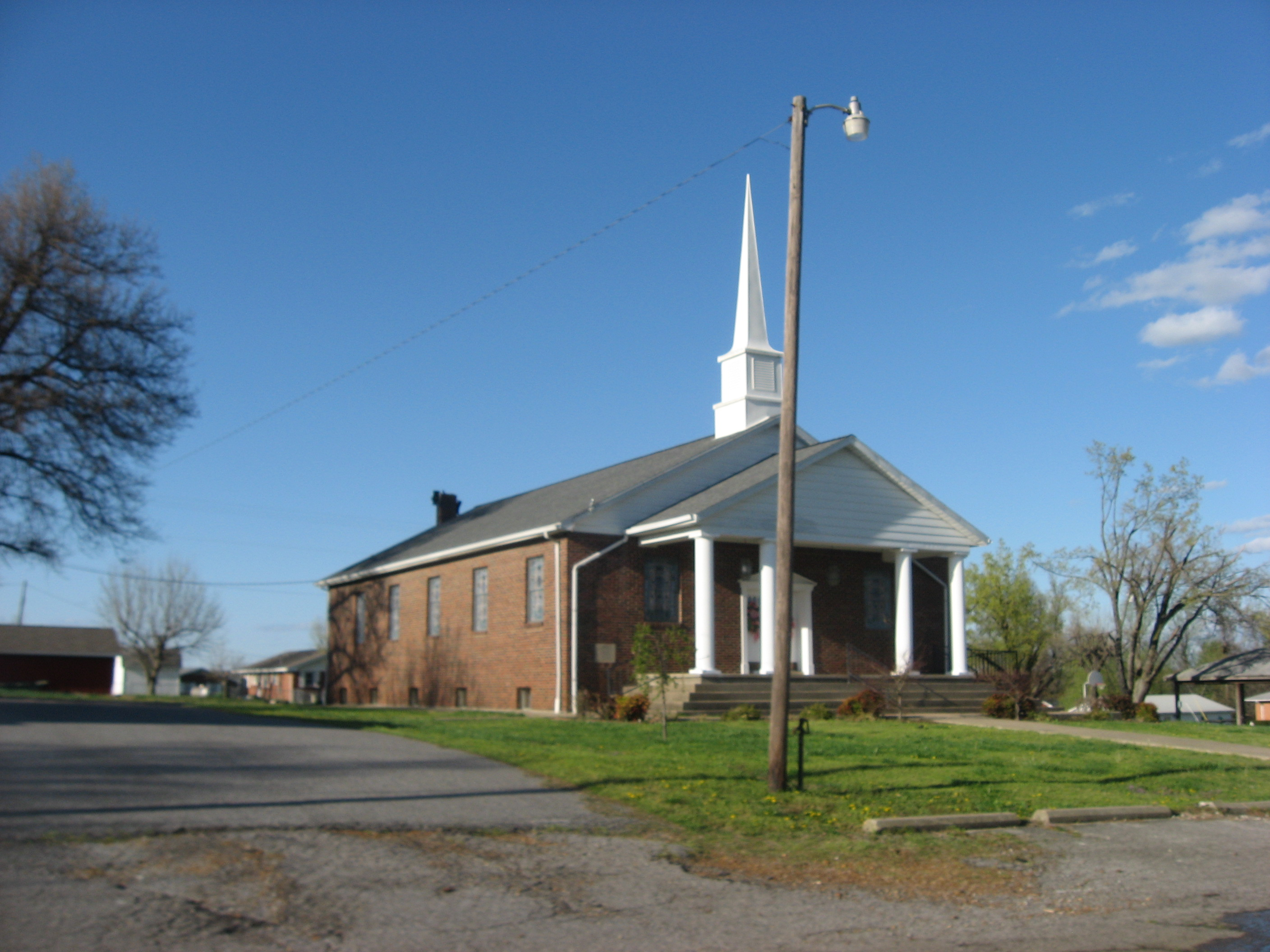
- Methodist church

- Location within the state of Kentucky Cunningham (the United States)
- Coordinates: 36°54′27″N 88°53′23″W
- Country: United States
- State: Kentucky
- County: Carlisle

Government

Area
  - Total: 1.05 sq mi (2.73 km^{2})
  - Land: 1.05 sq mi (2.72 km^{2})
  - Water: 0.0039 sq mi (0.01 km^{2})
- Elevation: 397 ft (121 m)

Population (2020)
  - Total: 272
  - Density: 259.2/sq mi (100.08/km^{2})
- Time zone: UTC-6 (Central (CST))
  - Summer (DST): UTC-5 (CST)
- ZIP codes: 42035
- Area codes: 270 & 364
- FIPS code: 21-19234
- GNIS feature ID: 490489

Cunningham is an unincorporated community in Carlisle County, Kentucky, United States. As of the 2020 census, Cunningham had a population of 272.

It is the home to the Cunningham Strawberry Festival.

== Demographics ==
Historical population
Census	Pop.	Note	%±
2020	272		—
U.S. Decennial Census
