= Mima, Kentucky =

Unincorporated community in Kentucky, United States

- Unincorporated community
- Location within Kentucky Location within the United States
- Coordinates: 37°55′14″N 83°02′12″W
- Country: United States
- State: Kentucky
- County: Morgan
- Elevation: 1,010 ft (310 m)
- Time zone: UTC-5 (Eastern (EST))
  - Summer (DST): UTC-4 (EDT)
- GNIS feature ID: 508612

Mima is an unincorporated community in Morgan County, Kentucky. Mima lies at an elevation of 1010 feet (308 m).
