= Green, Kentucky =

Unincorporated community in Kentucky, United States

- Unincorporated community
- Location within the state of Kentucky Green (the United States)
- Coordinates: 38°8′26″N 83°4′31″W
- Country: United States
- State: Kentucky
- County: Elliott
- Elevation: 761 ft (232 m)
- Time zone: UTC-5 (Eastern (EST))
  - Summer (DST): UTC-4 (EDT)
- GNIS feature ID: 508125

Green is an unincorporated community within Elliott County, Kentucky, United States.

A post office was established in the community in 1899, and named for Robert Kilgore Green, an early settler in the area. Its post office has since closed.
