= Woodsonville, Kentucky =

Unincorporated community in Kentucky, United States

- Unincorporated community
- Location within Kentucky Location within the United States
- Coordinates: 37°15′46″N 85°53′18″W
- Country: United States
- State: Kentucky
- County: Hart
- Elevation: 564 ft (172 m)
- Time zone: UTC-6 (Central (CST))
  - Summer (DST): UTC-5 (CDT)
- Area codes: 270 & 364
- GNIS feature ID: 507125

Woodsonville is an unincorporated community in Hart County, Kentucky, in the United States.

== History ==
A post office was established at Woodsonville in 1818, and remained in operation until it was discontinued in 1906. The community was named for Thomas Woodson.
