= Cork, Kentucky =

Unincorporated community in Kentucky, United States

- Unincorporated community
- Location within Kentucky Location within the United States
- Coordinates: 37°2′15″N 85°35′00″W
- Country: United States
- State: Kentucky
- County: Metcalfe
- Elevation: 945 ft (288 m)
- Time zone: UTC-5 (Eastern (EST))
  - Summer (DST): UTC-4 (EDT)
- GNIS feature ID: 507761

Cork is an unincorporated community located in Metcalfe County, Kentucky, United States.
