= Delphia, Kentucky =

Unincorporated community in Kentucky, United States

Delphia
- Unincorporated community
- Location within the state of Kentucky Delphia (the United States)
- Coordinates: 37°1′46″N 83°5′13″W
- Country: United States
- State: Kentucky
- County: Perry
- Elevation: 1,476 ft (450 m)
- Time zone: UTC-5 (Eastern (EST))
  - Summer (DST): UTC-4 (EDT)
- ZIP codes: 41735
- GNIS feature ID: 511778

Delphia is an unincorporated community located in Perry County, Kentucky, United States. It still maintains a U.S. Post Office with the zip code 41735.
