= Roaring Spring, Kentucky =

Unincorporated community in Kentucky, United States

Roaring Spring
- Unincorporated community
- Location within the state of Kentucky Roaring Spring (the United States)
- Coordinates: 36°43′32″N 87°42′25″W
- Country: United States
- State: Kentucky
- County: Trigg
- Elevation: 558 ft (170 m)
- Time zone: UTC-6 (Central (CST))
  - Summer (DST): UTC-5 (CST)
- GNIS feature ID: 502041

Roaring Spring is an unincorporated community in Trigg County, Kentucky, United States.

A post office called Roaring Spring was established in 1849 and remained in operation until 1909. The community seized its name from a nearby cave spring, that momentarily produced a roar.

== Notable people ==
- Hugh "Riccardo" Martin, opera singer
