= Monroe, Kentucky =

Unincorporated community in Kentucky, United States

- Unincorporated community
- Location within Kentucky Location within the United States
- Coordinates: 37°13′56″N 85°41′52″W
- Country: United States
- State: Kentucky
- County: Hart
- Elevation: 712 ft (217 m)
- Time zone: UTC-6 (Central (CST))
  - Summer (DST): UTC-5 (CDT)
- Area codes: 270 & 364
- GNIS feature ID: 495517

Monroe is an unincorporated community in Hart County, Kentucky, in the United States.

== History ==
A post office called Monroe was established in 1878, and remained in operation until it was discontinued in 1919. The community was named for President James Monroe.
