= Enon, Kentucky =

Unincorporated community in Kentucky, United States

Enon
- Unincorporated community
- Location within the state of Kentucky Enon (the United States)
- Coordinates: 37°15′13″N 87°59′24″W
- Country: United States
- State: Kentucky
- County: Caldwell
- Elevation: 482 ft (147 m)
- Time zone: UTC-6 (Central (CST))
  - Summer (DST): UTC-5 (CST)
- GNIS feature ID: 507943

Enon is an unincorporated community in Caldwell County, Kentucky, United States. It was also known as Walnut Grove.
