= Lunah, Kentucky =

Unincorporated community in Kentucky, United States

Lunah
- Unincorporated community
- Location within the state of Kentucky Lunah (the United States)
- Coordinates: 37°33′45″N 83°10′37″W
- Country: United States
- State: Kentucky
- County: Breathitt
- Elevation: 807 ft (246 m)
- Time zone: UTC−5 (EST)
  - Summer (DST): UTC−4 (EDT)
- ZIP codes: 41339
- GNIS feature ID: 508517

Lunah is a rural unincorporated community in northeast Breathitt County, Kentucky, United States.
