= McBrayer, Kentucky =

Unincorporated community in Kentucky, United States

- Unincorporated community
- Location within Kentucky
- Coordinates: 37°58′31″N 84°53′08″W
- Country: United States
- State: Kentucky
- County: Anderson
- Elevation: 833 ft (254 m)
- Time zone: UTC-5 (Eastern (EST))
  - Summer (DST): UTC-4 (EDT)
- Area code: 502
- GNIS feature ID: 497764

McBrayer is an unincorporated community in Anderson County, Kentucky, United States.
