= Uno, Kentucky =

Unincorporated community in Kentucky, United States

- Unincorporated community
- Location within Kentucky Location within the United States
- Coordinates: 37°11′21″N 85°49′28″W
- Country: United States
- State: Kentucky
- County: Hart
- Elevation: 643 ft (196 m)
- Time zone: UTC-6 (Central (CST))
  - Summer (DST): UTC-5 (CST)
- GNIS feature ID: 509262

Uno is a small unincorporated community in Hart County, Kentucky, United States.

== Geography ==
Uno is located east and slightly north of Horse Cave on U.S. Route 31E at its junction with Kentucky Route 571.

== History ==
Uno was settled at some point in the mid-19th century. The community's post office was established as Uno at sometime in the 1880s; its original name Clear Point belonged to another town before mail routes were established in the community.

It originally was known locally as a trading point of moonshine. According to tradition, discreet buyers of moonshine would say they were going to "You know" in order to get their supply.
