= Royrader, Kentucky =

Unincorporated community in Kentucky, United States

- Unincorporated community
- Location within Kentucky Location within the United States
- Coordinates: 37°15′49″N 83°56′35″W
- Country: United States
- State: Kentucky
- County: Jackson
- Elevation: 1,033 ft (315 m)
- Time zone: UTC-5 (Eastern (EST))
  - Summer (DST): UTC-4 (EST)
- ZIP codes: 40402
- Area code: 606
- GNIS feature ID

Royrader is an unincorporated community in Jackson County, in the U.S. state of Kentucky. A post office called Royrader was established in 1927, and remained in operation until 1969. The community derives its name from Roy Rader, a businessperson in the local lumber industry. The community is along Kentucky Route 578 approximately 4 miles south of Annville, Kentucky, the county's largest community.
