= Romine, Kentucky =

Unincorporated community in Kentucky, United States

Coordinates: 37°14′08″N 85°21′01″W

Romine is an unincorporated community in Taylor County, in the U.S. state of Kentucky.

== History ==
A post office called Romine was established in 1901, and remained in operation until 1942. Melvin Romine, the first postmaster, gave the community his name.
