= Alton, Kentucky =

Unincorporated community in Kentucky, United States

Alton
- Unincorporated community
- Location within the state of Kentucky Alton (the United States)
- Coordinates: 38°5′20″N 84°56′6″W
- Country: United States
- State: Kentucky
- County: Anderson
- Elevation: 840 ft (260 m)

Population (2000)
  - Total: 200
- Time zone: UTC-5 (Eastern (EST))
  - Summer (DST): UTC-4 (EDT)
- GNIS feature ID: 485900

Alton is an unincorporated community located in Anderson County, Kentucky, United States. Its post office is closed.

The community was originally known as Rough and Ready after the nickname of United States President Zachary Taylor. The town was incorporated under this name in 1850.
