= Hopson, Kentucky =

Unincorporated community in Kentucky, United States

Hopson
- Unincorporated community
- Location within the state of Kentucky Hopson (the United States)
- Coordinates: 36°59′24″N 87°50′49″W
- Country: United States
- State: Kentucky
- County: Caldwell
- Elevation: 541 ft (165 m)
- Time zone: UTC-6 (Central (CST))
  - Summer (DST): UTC-5 (CST)
- GNIS feature ID: 494552

Hopson is an unincorporated community in Caldwell County, Kentucky, United States.
