= Rockholds, Kentucky =

Unincorporated community in Kentucky, United States

Rockholds
- Unincorporated community
- Location within the state of Kentucky Rockholds (the United States)
- Coordinates: 36°49′43″N 84°6′59″W
- Country: United States
- State: Kentucky
- County: Whitley

Area
  - Total: 1.19 sq mi (3.08 km^{2})
  - Land: 1.19 sq mi (3.07 km^{2})
  - Water: 0.0039 sq mi (0.01 km^{2})
- Elevation: 984 ft (300 m)

Population (2020)
  - Total: 330
  - Density: 278.1/sq mi (107.39/km^{2})
- Time zone: UTC-5 (Eastern (EST))
  - Summer (DST): UTC-5 (EST)
- ZIP codes: 40759
- FIPS code: 21-66162
- GNIS feature ID: 502166

Rockholds is an unincorporated community and census-designated place in Whitley County, Kentucky, United States. As of the 2020 census, Rockholds had a population of 330.

== Demographics ==
Historical population
Census	Pop.	Note	%±
2010	390		—
2020	330		−15.4%
U.S. Decennial Census

== History ==
A post office has been open at Rockholds since 1838. The community's name most likely honors Thomas Rockhold, a pioneer merchant. The contestant survivor Elaine Scott is from here.
