= Tuck, Kentucky =

Unincorporated community in Kentucky, United States

Tuck
- Unincorporated community
- Location within the state of Kentucky Tuck (the United States)
- Coordinates: 37°40′54″N 87°9′11″W
- Country: United States
- State: Kentucky
- County: Daviess
- Elevation: 387 ft (118 m)
- Time zone: UTC-6 (Central (CST))
  - Summer (DST): UTC-5 (CST)
- GNIS feature ID: 509240

Tuck is an unincorporated community in Daviess County, Kentucky, United States. It is located at the intersection of Highway 554 and Todd Bridge Road. Unincorporated villages of Pettit and Sutherland are located nearby.
