= Milford, Kentucky =

Unincorporated community in Kentucky, United States

- Unincorporated community
- Location within Kentucky Location within the United States
- Coordinates: 38°34′54″N 84°9′24″W
- Country: United States
- State: Kentucky
- County: Bracken
- Elevation: 607 ft (185 m)
- Time zone: UTC-5 (Eastern (EST))
  - Summer (DST): UTC-4 (EDT)
- ZIP codes: 41061
- GNIS feature ID: 498188

Milford is an unincorporated community in Bracken County, in the U.S. state of Kentucky. The ZIP Code for Milford is 41061.

== History ==
Milford was founded in 1831, and named for the nearby watermill on a ford of the Licking River. A post office has been in operation at Milford since 1832.
