= Rowena, Kentucky =

Unincorporated community in Kentucky, US

Rowena
- Unincorporated community
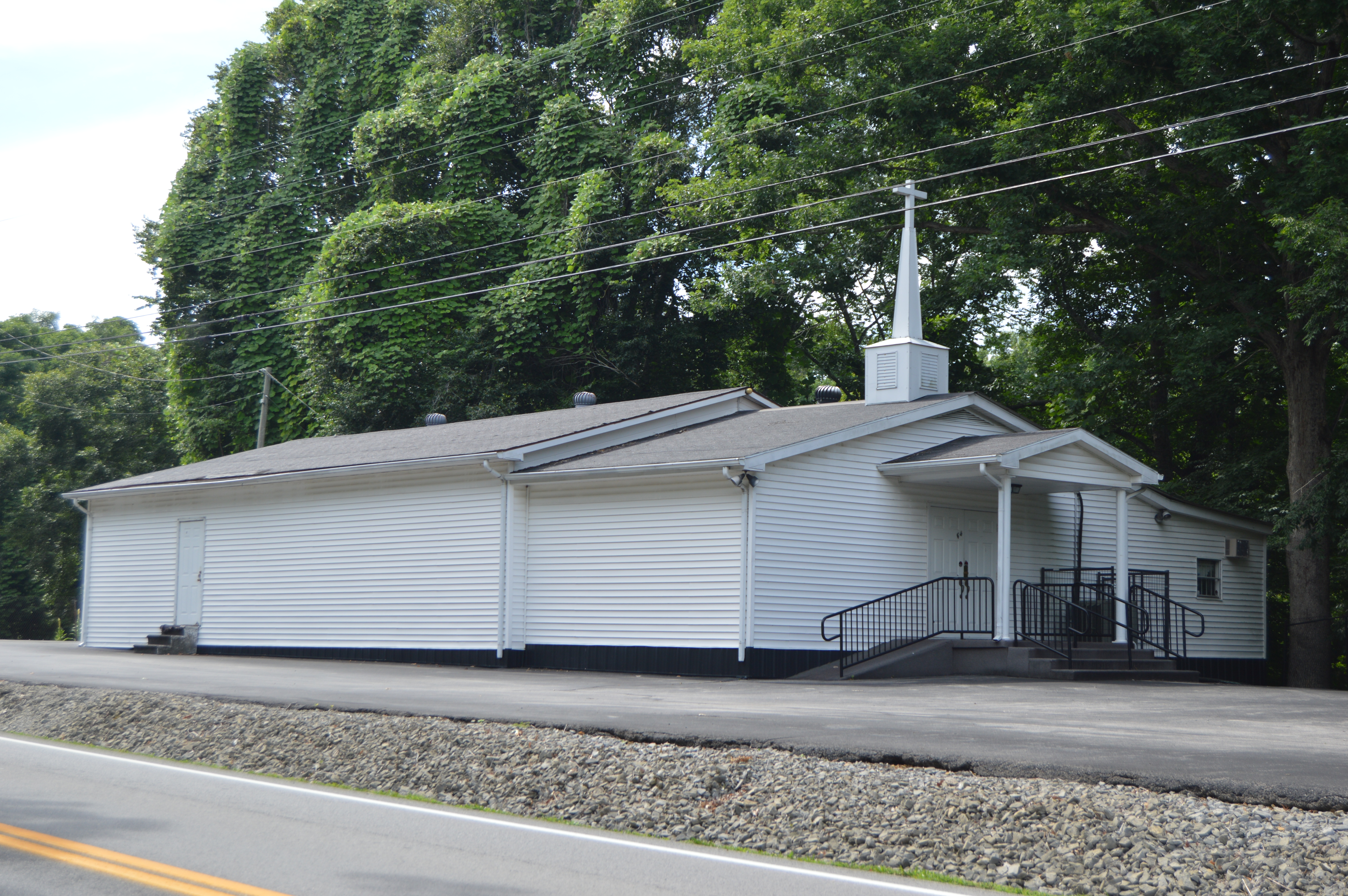
- Baptist church on U.S. Route 127

- Location within the state of Kentucky Rowena (the United States)
- Coordinates: 36°52′40″N 85°6′23″W
- Country: United States
- State: Kentucky
- County: Russell
- Elevation: 981 ft (299 m)
- Time zone: UTC-6 (Central (CST))
  - Summer (DST): UTC-5 (EDT)
- GNIS feature ID: 508982

Rowena is an unincorporated community located in Russell County, Kentucky, United States.

A post office called Rowena was established in 1847, and remained in operation until 1967. The community most likely was named after a local woman.

The community was flooded in 1951 and sank beneath Lake Cumberland, the lake that was created on the Cumberland River by the construction of the Wolf Creek Dam by the TVA, the Tennessee Valley Authority.
