= Hatcher, Kentucky =

Unincorporated community in Kentucky, United States

Hatcher
- Unincorporated community
- Location within the state of Kentucky Hatcher (the United States)
- Coordinates: 37°17′41″N 85°21′59″W
- Country: United States
- State: Kentucky
- County: Taylor
- Elevation: 820 ft (250 m)
- Time zone: UTC-5 (Eastern (EST))
  - Summer (DST): UTC-4 (EDT)
- GNIS feature ID: 508203

Hatcher is an unincorporated community in Taylor County, Kentucky, United States. It lies along Route 55 south of the city of Campbellsville, the county seat of Taylor County. Its elevation is 820 feet (250 m).
