= Barnetts Creek, Kentucky =

Unincorporated community in Kentucky, United States

- Unincorporated community
- Location within Kentucky Location within the United States
- Coordinates: 37°49′40″N 82°52′47″W
- Country: United States
- State: Kentucky
- County: Johnson
- Elevation: 633 ft (193 m)
- Time zone: UTC-5 (Eastern (EST))
  - Summer (DST): UTC-4 (EDT)
- ZIP codes: 41256
- GNIS feature ID: 507457

Barnetts Creek is an unincorporated community in Johnson County, Kentucky, United States.
