= Flag Fork, Kentucky =

Unincorporated community in Kentucky, United States

- Unincorporated community
- Location within the state of Kentucky Flag; Fork (the United States)
- Coordinates: 38°19′17″N 84°56′54″W
- Country: United States
- State: Kentucky
- County: Franklin
- Elevation: 673 ft (205 m)
- Time zone: UTC-5 (Eastern (EST))
  - Summer (DST): UTC-4 (EDT)
- GNIS feature ID: 508003

Flag Fork is an unincorporated community in Franklin County, Kentucky, United States. Its post office was open from 1875 to 1909.

The original name of the community was Baileys Mill. US Route 421 runs through the community.
