= Anthoston, Kentucky =

Census-designated place in Kentucky, United States

- Census-designated place
- Location within Kentucky Location within the United States
- Coordinates: 37°45′34″N 87°32′18″W
- Country: United States
- State: Kentucky
- County: Henderson

Area
  - Total: 0.65 sq mi (1.68 km^{2})
  - Land: 0.64 sq mi (1.67 km^{2})
  - Water: 0.0039 sq mi (0.01 km^{2})
- Elevation: 455 ft (139 m)

Population (2020)
  - Total: 225
  - Density: 349.0/sq mi (134.74/km^{2})
- Time zone: UTC-6 (Central (CST))
  - Summer (DST): UTC-5 (CST)
- FIPS code: 21-01720
- GNIS feature ID: 485968

Anthoston is an unincorporated community and census-designated place (CDP) in Henderson County, Kentucky, United States. It is 6 miles (10 km) south of Henderson, the county seat, between U.S. Route 41 to the west and Interstate 69, the former Pennyrile Parkway, to the east. There is no direct access to it from I-69.

Anthoston Had a radio station that went on the air in 1970 WAUZ At 103.1 MHz FM Later became WBIC, WHKC and WGBF-FM. Their tower and transmitter were moved to the present location in 1987.

Anthoston was first listed as a CDP in 2014. As of the 2020 census, Anthoston had a population of 225.

== Demographics ==
Historical population
Census	Pop.	Note	%±
2020	225		—
U.S. Decennial Census
