= Keck, Kentucky =

Unincorporated community in Kentucky, United States

Keck
- Unincorporated community
- Location within the state of Kentucky Keck (the United States)
- Coordinates: 37°36′16″N 83°21′33″W
- Country: United States
- State: Kentucky
- County: Breathitt
- Elevation: 778 ft (237 m)
- Time zone: UTC-6 (Central (CST))
  - Summer (DST): UTC-5 (CST)
- GNIS feature ID: 508371

Keck is an unincorporated community in Breathitt County, Kentucky, United States.
