= Nolansburg, Kentucky =

Unincorporated community in Kentucky, United States

- Unincorporated community
- Location within Kentucky Location within the United States
- Coordinates: 36°55′32″N 83°9′50″W
- Country: United States
- State: Kentucky
- County: Harlan
- Elevation: 1,289 ft (393 m)
- Time zone: UTC-6 (Central (CST))
  - Summer (DST): UTC-5 (CST)
- GNIS feature ID: 514282

Nolansburg is an unincorporated community and coal town in Harlan County, Kentucky, United States.
