= Rosspoint, Kentucky =

Unincorporated community in Kentucky, United States

- Unincorporated community
- Location within Kentucky Location within the United States
- Coordinates: 36°52′56″N 83°17′22″W
- Country: United States
- State: Kentucky
- County: Harlan
- Elevation: 1,220 ft (370 m)
- Time zone: UTC-5 (Eastern (EST))
  - Summer (DST): UTC-4 (EDT)
- GNIS feature ID: 515120

Rosspoint is an unincorporated community in Harlan County, Kentucky, United States. Its post office is closed.
