= Dongola, Kentucky =

Unincorporated community in Kentucky, United States

- Unincorporated community
- Location in Kentucky Location in the United States
- Coordinates: 37°5′50″N 82°50′37″W
- Country: United States
- State: Kentucky
- County: Letcher
- Elevation: 1,145 ft (349 m)
- Time zone: UTC-5 (Eastern (EST))
  - Summer (DST): UTC-4 (EDT)
- Area code: 606
- GNIS feature ID: 507867

Dongola, also known as Little Cowan, as its creek feeds into "Big" Cowan Creek is an unincorporated community in Letcher County, Kentucky, United States. Dongola had a post office from 1901 to 1984.
