= Fredville, Kentucky =

Unincorporated community in Kentucky, US

- Unincorporated community
- Location within Kentucky Location within the United States
- Coordinates: 37°36′19″N 82°57′53″W
- Country: United States
- State: Kentucky
- County: Magoffin
- Elevation: 951 ft (290 m)
- Time zone: UTC-5 (Eastern (EST))
  - Summer (DST): UTC-4 (EDT)
- GNIS feature ID: 508035

Fredville is an unincorporated farming community in Magoffin County, Kentucky, United States. It lies along State Route 7 southeast of the city of Salyersville, the county seat of Magoffin County. Its elevation is 951 feet (290 m).

A post office was established at the community's site in 1916: Fredville was named for the son of the first postmaster Cynthia Ann Carpenter. That post office no longer exists, nor are there any services or businesses at Fredville as of 2015, only a handful of homes, mostly associated with small farms.
