= Cranks Creek Lake =

- Location within Kentucky Location within the United States
- Location: Harlan County, Kentucky
- Coordinates: 36°44′35″N 83°13′46″W
- Type: reservoir
- Basin countries: United States
- Surface area: 219 acres (89 ha)
- Surface elevation: 1,404 ft (428 m)

Cranks Creek Lake is a 219-acre (0.89 km^{2}) reservoir in Harlan County, Kentucky. It was created in 1963.
