= Neave, Kentucky =

Unincorporated community in Kentucky, United States

Neave
- Unincorporated community
- Location within the state of Kentucky Neave (the United States)
- Coordinates: 38°38′51″N 84°12′8″W
- Country: United States
- State: Kentucky
- County: Bracken
- Elevation: 948 ft (289 m)
- Time zone: UTC-5 (Eastern (EST))
  - Summer (DST): UTC-4 (EDT)
- GNIS feature ID: 508678

Neave is an unincorporated community located in Bracken County, Kentucky, United States.

== History ==
A post office called Neave was established in 1879, and remained in operation until 1906. A variant name was Holton's Corner.
