= Plum, Kentucky =

Unincorporated community in Kentucky, United States

- Unincorporated community
- Location within Kentucky
- Coordinates: 38°10′44″N 84°1′53″W
- Country: United States
- State: Kentucky
- County: Bourbon
- Elevation: 850 ft (260 m)
- Time zone: UTC-5 (Eastern (EST))
  - Summer (DST): UTC-4 (EDT)
- GNIS feature ID: 508837

Plum is an unincorporated community in Bourbon County, Kentucky, United States. It was also known as Pinhook.
