= Watauga, Kentucky =

Unincorporated community in Kentucky, United States

Watauga
- Unincorporated community
- Location within the state of Kentucky Watauga (the United States)
- Coordinates: 36°49′1″N 85°3′53″W
- Country: United States
- State: Kentucky
- County: Clinton
- Elevation: 1,050 ft (320 m)
- Time zone: UTC-6 (Central (CST))
  - Summer (DST): UTC-5 (CDT)
- GNIS feature ID: 509321

Watauga is an unincorporated community within Clinton County, Kentucky, United States. Its post office is closed.
