= Gordon, Kentucky =

Unincorporated community in Kentucky, United States

- Unincorporated community
- Location in Kentucky Location in the United States
- Coordinates: 36°59′57″N 83°1′55″W
- Country: United States
- State: Kentucky
- County: Letcher
- Elevation: 1,352 ft (412 m)
- Time zone: UTC-5 (Eastern (EST))
  - Summer (DST): UTC-4 (EDT)
- ZIP codes: 41819
- GNIS feature ID: 512354

Gordon is an unincorporated community located in Letcher County, Kentucky, United States. Its post office is closed.
