= Stoops, Kentucky =

Unincorporated community in Kentucky, United States

- Unincorporated community
- Location within Kentucky Location within the United States
- Coordinates: 38°7′41″N 83°54′52″W
- Country: United States
- State: Kentucky
- County: Montgomery
- Elevation: 974 ft (297 m)
- Time zone: UTC-5 (Eastern (EST))
  - Summer (DST): UTC-4 (EDT)
- GNIS feature ID: 509141

Stoops is an unincorporated community within Montgomery County, Kentucky, United States. Its post office is closed.
