= National Register of Historic Places listings in Green County, Kentucky =

Location of Green County in Kentucky

This is a list of the National Register of Historic Places listings in Green County, Kentucky.

This is intended to be a complete list of the properties and districts on the National Register of Historic Places in Green County, Kentucky, United States. The locations of National Register properties and districts for which the latitude and longitude coordinates are included below, may be seen in a map.

There are 46 properties and districts listed on the National Register in the county.

This National Park Service list is complete through NPS recent listings posted April 3, 2026.

== Current listings ==
	Name on the Register	Image	Date listed	Location	City or town	Description
1	James Allen's Inn	James Allen's Inn	January 8, 1987 (#87000206)	103 E. Court St. 37°15′38″N 85°30′05″W	Greensburg	
2	John C. Allen House		April 19, 1985 (#85000917)	Kentucky Route 61; 37°18′41″N 85°30′44″W	Summersville	
3	Anderson House	Anderson House	August 24, 1984 (#84001496)	Kentucky Route 1913; 37°11′37″N 85°23′09″W	Haskingsville	
4	Barrett-Blakeman House	Barrett-Blakeman House	April 19, 1985 (#85000909)	Hodgenville Rd. 37°15′52″N 85°30′15″W	Greensburg	
5	Brents-Lisle House		August 24, 1984 (#84001501)	U.S. Route 68; 37°13′45″N 85°30′17″W	Greensburg	
6	Chewning House		August 24, 1984 (#84001502)	Kentucky Route 88; 37°14′13″N 85°37′35″W	Donansburg	
7	Christopher Columbus Christie House	Christopher Columbus Christie House	August 24, 1984 (#84001503)	Kentucky Route 1915; 37°11′26″N 85°23′18″W	Haskingsville	
8	Court Clerk's Office-County & Circuit	Court Clerk's Office-County & Circuit	January 8, 1987 (#87000176)	East Court St. 37°15′37″N 85°30′04″W	Greensburg	
9	Francis Cowherd House		April 19, 1985 (#85000908)	Off U.S. Route 68; 37°18′41″N 85°30′44″W	Greensburg	
10	Creal Store		August 24, 1984 (#84001504)	Kentucky Route 61; 37°25′40″N 85°38′13″W	Creal	
11	Elijah Creel House	Elijah Creel House	December 3, 2008 (#85003589)	E. Columbia Ave. 37°15′28″N 85°29′57″W	Greensburg	
12	Downtown Greensburg Historic District	Downtown Greensburg Historic District	February 28, 2003 (#02001466)	Public Square and area bounded by N. and S. Main St. and E. and W. Court Sts. 37°15′40″N 85°30′08″W	Greensburg	
13	Ebenezer School	Ebenezer School	August 24, 1984 (#84001505)	Off Kentucky Route 61; 37°12′38″N 85°26′34″W	Greensburg	
14	Edwards House		August 24, 1984 (#84001507)	Kentucky Route 745; 37°07′41″N 85°32′08″W	Exie	
15	David Edwards House		August 24, 1984 (#84001506)	Off Kentucky Route 745; 37°06′54″N 85°33′21″W	Exie	
16	Elmore-Carter House	Elmore-Carter House	August 24, 1984 (#84001508)	Kentucky Route 793; 37°19′20″N 85°30′17″W	Summersville	
17	Emory-Blakeman-Penick House	Emory-Blakeman-Penick House	August 24, 1984 (#84001509)	Off Kentucky Route 487; 37°15′21″N 85°27′44″W	Greensburg	
18	Federal House	Federal House	April 19, 1985 (#85000910)	S. Main and E. Columbia; 37°15′33″N 85°30′09″W	Greensburg	
19	Goose Creek Foot Bridge	Goose Creek Foot Bridge	April 19, 1985 (#85000911)	Court and Depot Sts. 37°15′37″N 85°30′00″W	Greensburg	
20	Greensburg Academy	Greensburg Academy	December 12, 1976 (#76000891)	101 2nd St. 37°15′41″N 85°30′18″W	Greensburg	
21	Greensburg Bank Building	Greensburg Bank Building	August 21, 1979 (#79000991)	E. Court St. 37°15′37″N 85°30′05″W	Greensburg	
22	Greensburg Cumberland Presbyterian Church	Greensburg Cumberland Presbyterian Church	April 19, 1985 (#85000912)	Hodgenville Ave. and N. 1st St. 37°15′45″N 85°30′08″W	Greensburg	
23	Groves-Cabell House		August 24, 1984 (#84001510)	Off Kentucky Route 61; 37°11′02″N 85°25′34″W	Gresham	
24	William H. Herndon House	William H. Herndon House	April 19, 1985 (#85000913)	203 S. Main St. 37°15′31″N 85°30′10″W	Greensburg	
25	David Hilliard House		August 24, 1984 (#84001511)	Off Kentucky Route 487; 37°14′55″N 85°26′27″W	Greensburg	
26	William Hobson House	William Hobson House	April 19, 1985 (#85000914)	102 S. Depot St. 37°15′33″N 85°29′56″W	Greensburg	
27	Keltner House	Keltner House	August 24, 1984 (#84001512)	Kentucky Route 1913; 37°11′38″N 85°22′42″W	Haskingsville	
28	L & N Passenger Depot	L & N Passenger Depot	August 24, 1984 (#84001513)	103 N. Depot St. 37°15′36″N 85°29′57″W	Greensburg	
29	Woodson Lewis House	Woodson Lewis House	April 19, 1985 (#85000915)	Main St. and Hodgenville Ave. 37°15′45″N 85°30′04″W	Greensburg	
30	Livesay House		August 24, 1984 (#84001514)	Off Kentucky Route 208; 37°16′09″N 85°25′36″W	Campbellsville	
31	Mears House		August 24, 1984 (#84001517)	Kentucky Route 61; 37°18′06″N 85°30′57″W	Greensburg	
32	Montgomery House		August 24, 1984 (#84001521)	Off Kentucky Route 1464; 37°16′27″N 85°38′25″W	Donansburg	
33	Montgomery-Sandidge House		August 2, 2017 (#100001421)	1851 Columbia Hwy. 37°14′12″N 85°29′36″W	Greensburg	
34	Montgomery's Mill		August 24, 1984 (#84001523)	Off Kentucky Route 88; 37°16′24″N 85°33′14″W	Greensburg	
35	Mt. Gilead Baptist Church	Mt. Gilead Baptist Church	August 24, 1984 (#84001519)	Kentucky Route 767; 37°10′13″N 85°22′56″W	Haskingsville	
36	Mud Brick House in Greensburg	Mud Brick House in Greensburg	February 3, 2010 (#09001307)	429 Campbellsville Rd. 37°16′08″N 85°29′54″W	Greensburg	
37	Old Courthouse	Old Courthouse	April 10, 1972 (#72000533)	Public Sq. 37°15′38″N 85°30′06″W	Greensburg	
38	Philpot House		April 19, 1985 (#85000907)	Kentucky Route 729; 37°08′46″N 85°36′07″W	Exie	
39	Sandidge House		August 24, 1984 (#84001525)	Kentucky Route 88; 37°13′31″N 85°39′42″W	Donansburg	
40	Simpson Log House		August 24, 1984 (#84001526)	Kentucky Route 1464; 37°15′30″N 85°36′43″W	Webbs	
41	Napoleon Wallace House		August 24, 1984 (#84001527)	Off Kentucky Route 218; 37°11′01″N 85°37′25″W	Pierce	
42	Webbs Female Academy	Webbs Female Academy	August 24, 1984 (#84001528)	Off Kentucky Route 88; 37°15′33″N 85°36′08″W	Webbs	
43	White-Penick House	White-Penick House	April 19, 1985 (#85000916)	106 S. Depot St. 37°15′30″N 85°29′58″W	Greensburg	
44	Whitlock Log Cabin	Whitlock Log Cabin	August 24, 1984 (#84001529)	U.S. Route 68; 37°09′32″N 85°32′13″W	Exie	
45	Daniel Motley Williams House		August 24, 1984 (#84001531)	Kentucky Route 323; 37°21′11″N 85°29′28″W	Summersville	
46	R.H. Wilson House	R.H. Wilson House	August 24, 1984 (#84001532)	402 N. Water St. 37°15′43″N 85°29′56″W	Greensburg	
47	Woodward House		August 24, 1984 (#84001534)	Off U.S. Route 68; 37°12′53″N 85°33′29″W	Greensburg	

== See also ==
- List of National Historic Landmarks in Kentucky
- National Register of Historic Places listings in Kentucky
