= Edwards House =

Edwards House or Edwards Farm or The Edwards House may refer to:

- W.A. Edwards House, Evening Shade, Arkansas, listed on the National Register of Historic Places (NRHP) in Sharp County, Arkansas
- Frank G. Edwards House, San Francisco, California, listed on the NRHP in San Francisco, California
- Davis-Edwards House, Monroe, Georgia, listed on the NRHP in Walton County, Georgia
- Edwards-Gillette Barn, Cambridge, Idaho, listed on the NRHP in Washington County, Idaho
- Shirk-Edwards House, Peru, Indiana, listed on the NRHP in Miami County, Indiana
- Edwards-Swayze House, Nevada, Iowa, listed on the NRHP in Story County, Iowa
- David Edwards House, Exie, Kentucky, listed on the NRHP in Green County, Kentucky
- Edwards House (Exie, Kentucky), listed on the NRHP in Green County, Kentucky
- Thomas Edwards House and Quarters, Tyrone, Kentucky, listed on the NRHP in Woodford County, Kentucky
- Edwards House (Walton, Kentucky), listed on the NRHP in Boone County, Kentucky
- Rock S. Edwards Farmstead, Sodus, Michigan, listed on the NRHP in Berrien County, Michigan
- Scott-Edwards House, Staten Island, New York, NRHP-listed
- John B. and Lydia Edwards House, Oswego, New York, NRHP-listed
- The Edwards House (Sayville, New York), listed on the NRHP in Islip, New York
- Adams-Edwards House, Raleigh, North Carolina, listed on the NRHP in Woodford County, North Carolina
- John Edwards House, Leipsic, Ohio, NRHP-listed
- William Edwards Farmhouse, Newtown, Ohio, NRHP-listed
- John Stark Edwards House, Warren, Ohio, listed on the NRHP in Trumbull County, Ohio
- Walter J. and Frances W. Edwards House, Oklahoma City, Oklahoma, listed on the NRHP in Oklahoma County, Oklahoma
- Jesse Edwards House, Newberg, Oregon, NRHP-listed
- J. G. Edwards House, Portland, Oregon, NRHP-listed
- Delaney-Edwards House, Salem, Oregon, listed on the NRHP in Oregon
- Broadus Edwards House, Batesburg, South Carolina, NRHP-listed
- Simmons-Edwards House, Charleston, South Carolina, NRHP-listed
- Wilds-Edwards House, Darlington, South Carolina, NRHP-listed
- Thompsie Edwards House, Lexington, Tennessee, listed on the NRHP in Henderson County, Tennessee
- Edwards-Fowler House, Lake City, Tennessee, listed on the NRHP in Anderson County, Tennessee
- Joel Edwards House, Port Townsend, Washington, listed on the NRHP in Jefferson County, Washington
- William H. & William S. Edwards House, Coalburg, West Virginia, NRHP-listed

== See also ==
- Edward House (disambiguation)
