= Chewning House =

Chewning House may refer to:

- Chewning House (Lawrence, Kansas), listed on the National Register of Historic Places (NRHP)
- Chewning House (Donansburg, Kentucky), NRHP-listed in Green County
- Chewning House (Hendersonville, North Carolina), NRHP-listed in Henderson County
