= Webbs =

Webbs may refer to:

- Webbs, Kentucky
- Stuart Webbs, a fictional detective in a series of German films and serials
- Sidney Webb, 1st Baron Passfield (1859–1947) and his wife Beatrice Webb (1858–1943), English socialists and social scientists
- Edward Webb and Sons, also known as Webbs, English seed merchants
- The Webbs, a band with Bobby Goldsboro as a member and was once the backing band for Roy Orbison

== See also ==
- Web (disambiguation)
- Webb (disambiguation)
