= Federal House =

- U.S. National Register of Historic Places
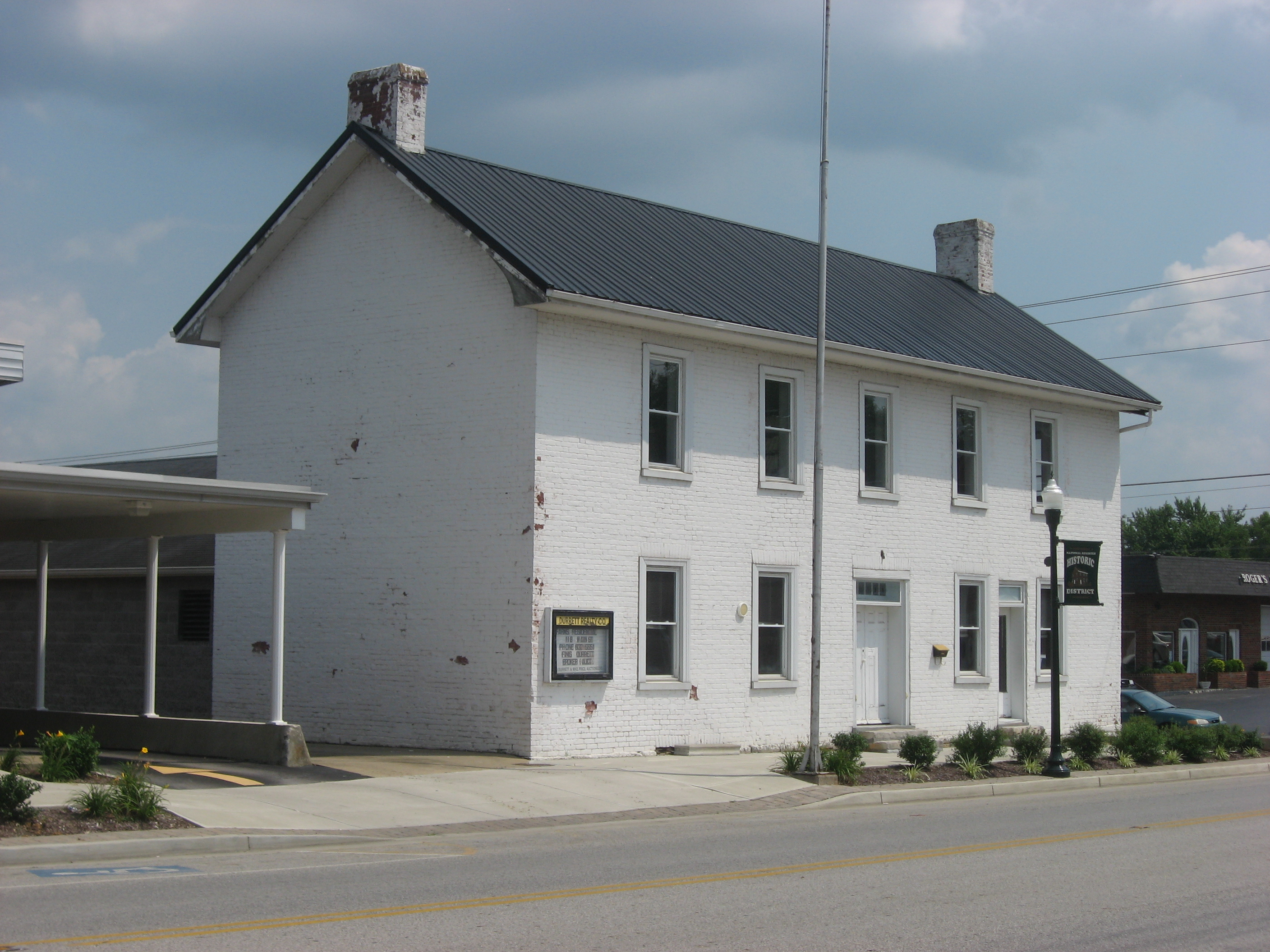

- Location within Kentucky Location within the United States
- Location: S. Main and E. Columbia, Greensburg, Kentucky
- Coordinates: 37°15′33″N 85°30′09″W
- Area: less than one acre
- Built: c.1826-50
- Architectural style: Federal
- MPS: Green County MRA
- NRHP reference No.: 85000910
- Added to NRHP: April 19, 1985

The Federal House in Greensburg, Kentucky, in Green County, Kentucky, was listed on the National Register of Historic Places in 1985.

It is located prominently at S. Main and E. Columbia in Greensburg. It is Federal in style. It was probably built between 1826 and 1850.

It is a two-story, five-bay brick central passage plan house, with brick laid in Flemish bond. Its interior includes simple Federal style mantels. It was described in 1984 as "one of the best examples in the county of Federal style architecture."
