= George Beal =

George Beal may refer to:

- George Lafayette Beal (1825–1896), Maine politician and American Civil War general
- George M. Beal, architect of Chewning House (Lawrence, Kansas)

== See also ==
- George Beall (1729–1807), wealthy landowner in Maryland and Georgetown in what is now Washington, D.C.
- George Beall (attorney) (1937–2017), U.S. attorney who prosecuted Vice President Spiro Agnew for bribery
- George Beel (1900–1980), English professional footballer
