= Daniel Motley Williams House =

- U.S. National Register of Historic Places
- Location within Kentucky Location within the United States
- Nearest city: Summersville, Kentucky
- Coordinates: 37°21′11″N 85°29′28″W
- Area: 1.4 acres (0.57 ha)
- Built: c. 1800
- Architectural style: Federal
- MPS: Green County MRA
- NRHP reference No.: 84001531
- Added to NRHP: August 24, 1984

The Daniel Motley Williams House in Green County, Kentucky near Summersville, Kentucky was built c. 1800. It was listed on the National Register of Historic Places in 1984.

The main house included Federal architecture. The listing included a total of four contributing buildings.

The house was deemed significant as the "only example in the county of the combination of single-pen & saddlebag log house forms."
