= Keltner House =

Historic house in Kentucky, United States

Coordinates: 37°11′38″N 85°22′42″W

- U.S. National Register of Historic Places
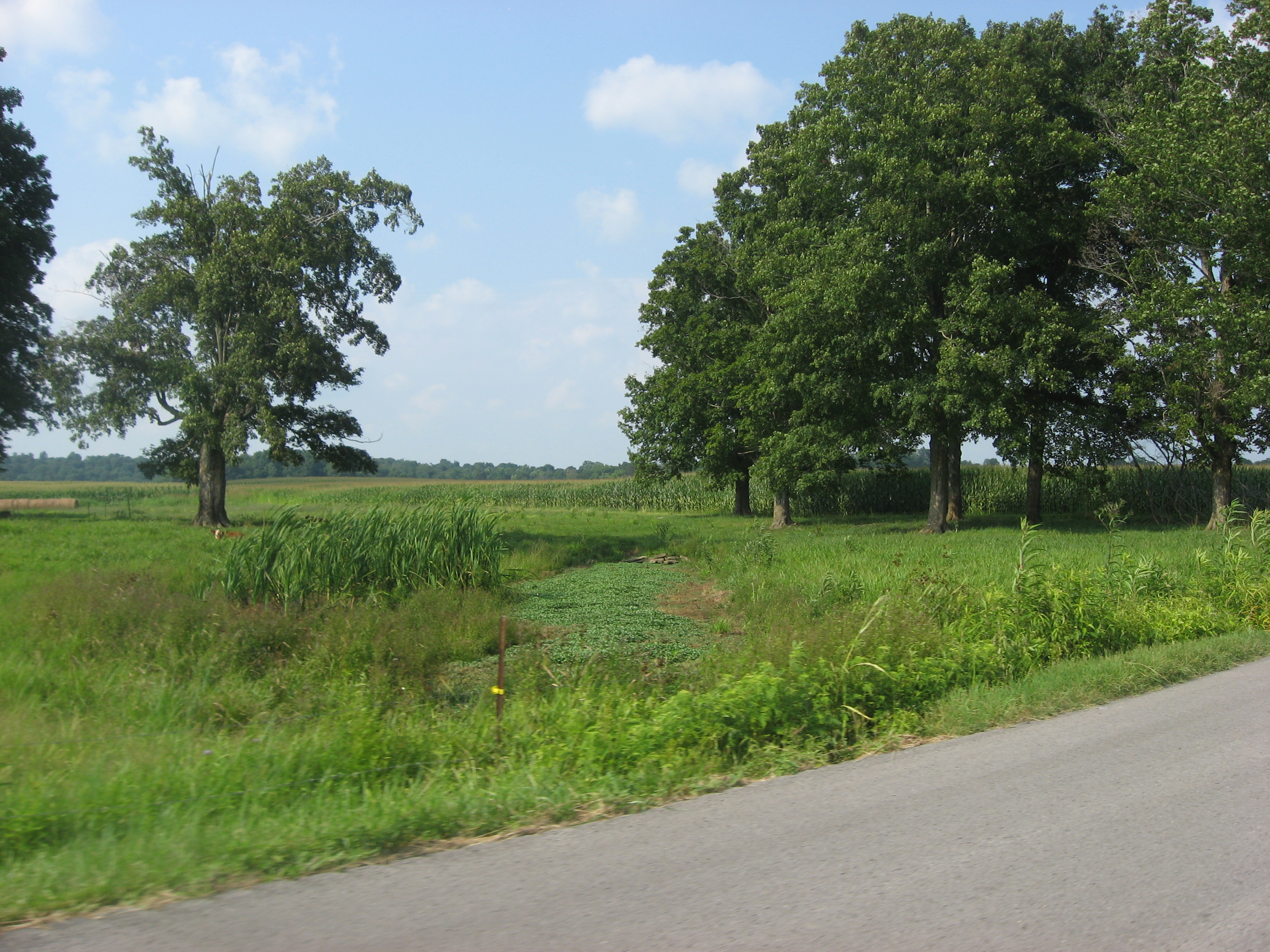
- Former site of Keltner House

- Location within Kentucky Location within the United States
- Nearest city: Haskingsville, Kentucky
- Area: 0.4 acres (0.16 ha)
- Built: {1826
- Architectural style: Federal
- MPS: Green County MRA
- NRHP reference No.: 84001512
- Added to NRHP: August 24, 1984

The Keltner House, located on Kentucky Route 1913 in Green County near Haskingsville, Kentucky, was listed on the National Register of Historic Places in 1984.

The house was deemed to be "one of the best examples of the stylistic transition between Federal and Greek Revival styles in the county."

The house is no longer at the location.
