= Brents-Lisle House =

- U.S. National Register of Historic Places
- Location within Kentucky Location within the United States
- Nearest city: Greensburg, Kentucky
- Coordinates: 37°13′45″N 85°30′17″W
- Area: 7.3 acres (3.0 ha)
- Built: 1826, 1850
- Architectural style: Greek Revival
- MPS: Green County MRA
- NRHP reference No.: 84001501
- Added to NRHP: August 24, 1984

The Brents-Lisle House, near Greensburg, Kentucky, was listed on the National Register of Historic Places in 1984.

The main house on the property is a two-story five-bay central passage plan brick house, built in Greek Revival style with a monumental portico. Also on the property is an older log cabin, possibly built by Samuel Brents (d. 1835). Brents served several times as a state representative, starting in 1803. The main house was built by/for Lisle, who married a daughter of Brents and was executor of his will. The property was deemed significant as the main, brick house "is one of the best examples of Greek Revival in the county; and the nearby log house contributes to the character of the site."

The property is located on U.S. Route 68.
