= Groves-Cabell House =

Historic house in Kentucky, United States

- U.S. National Register of Historic Places
- Location within Kentucky Location within the United States
- Nearest city: Gresham, Kentucky
- Coordinates: 37°11′02″N 85°25′34″W
- Area: 0.3 acres (0.12 ha)
- Architectural style: Italianate
- MPS: Green County MRA
- NRHP reference No.: 84001510
- Added to NRHP: August 24, 1984

The Groves-Cabell House, known also as the DeWitt House, located off Kentucky Route 61 near Gresham, Kentucky, was listed on the National Register of Historic Places in 1984.

It was deemed to be the best residential example of Italianate architecture in Green County.
