= Greensburg Cumberland Presbyterian Church =

Historic church in Kentucky, United States

- U.S. National Register of Historic Places
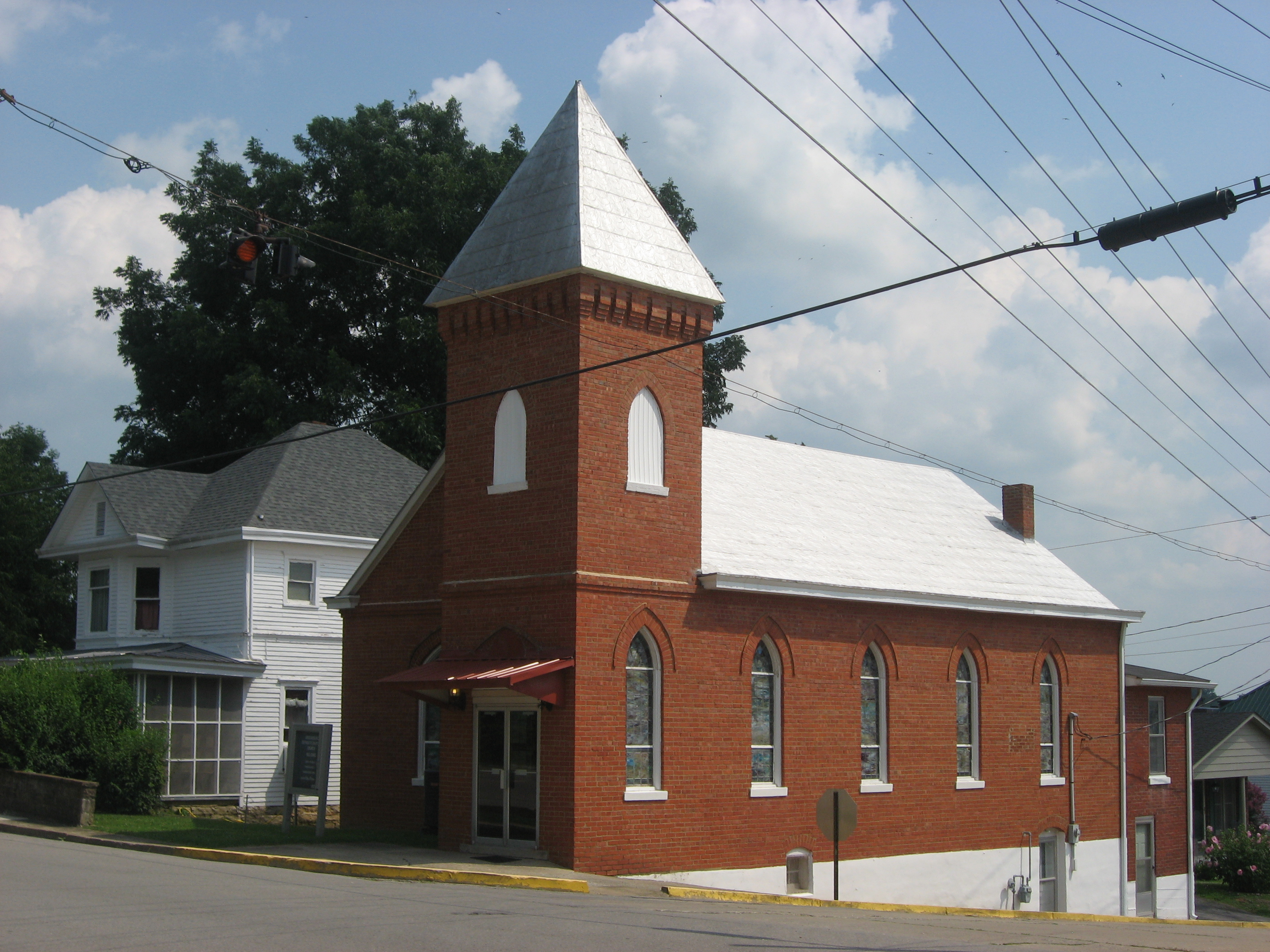
- Front and side of the church

- Location within Kentucky Location within the United States
- Location: Hodgenville Ave. and N. 1st St., Greensburg, Kentucky
- Coordinates: 37°15′45″N 85°30′8″W
- Area: 1 acre (0.40 ha)
- Built: 1876
- Architectural style: Gothic Revival
- MPS: Green County MRA
- NRHP reference No.: 85000912
- Added to NRHP: April 19, 1985

Greensburg Cumberland Presbyterian Church, also known as Greensburg Separate Baptist Church, is a history church at Hodgenville Avenue and N. 1st Street in Greensburg, Kentucky. It was built in 1876 and added to the National Register in 1985.

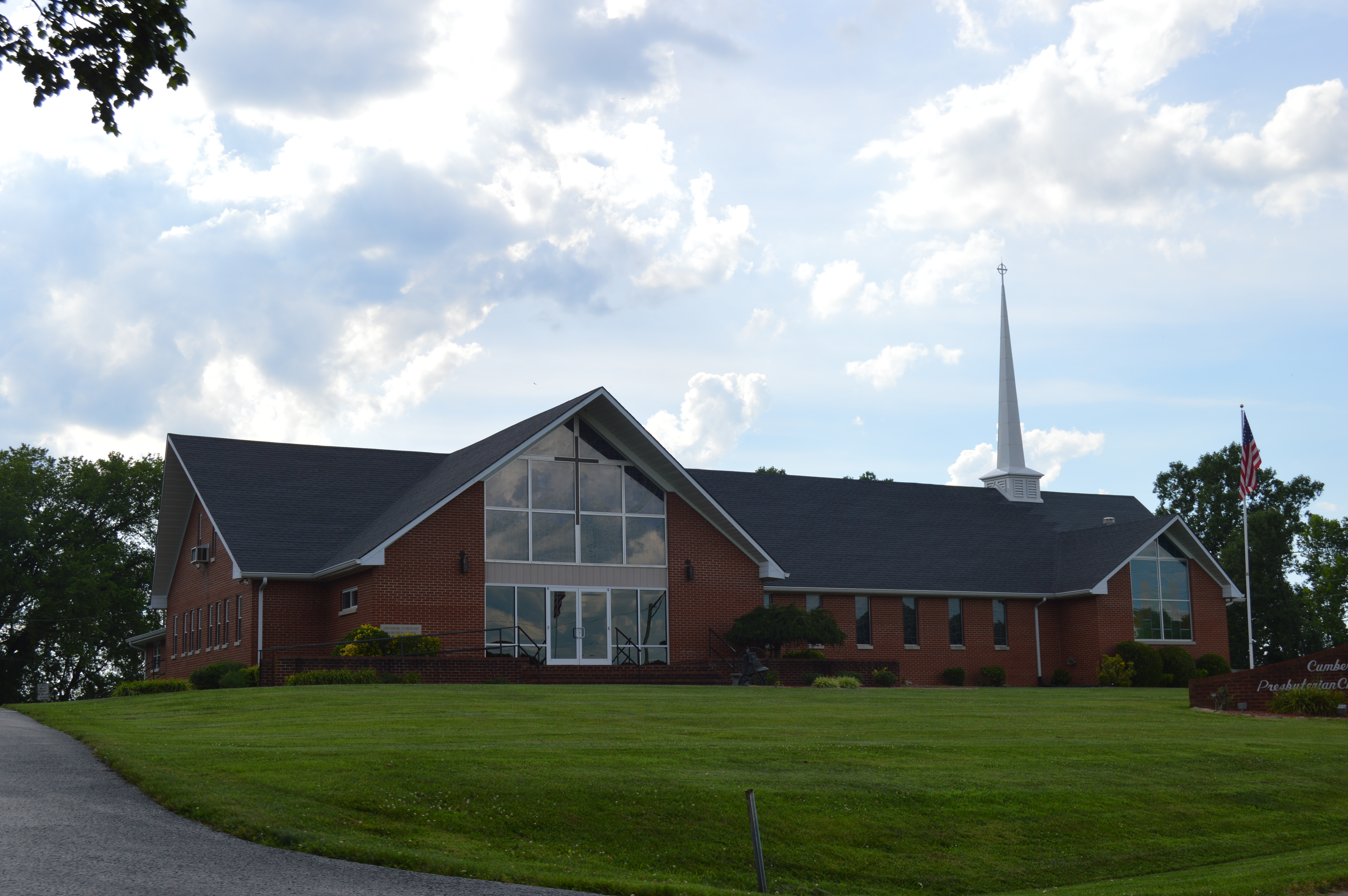
Greensburg CPC current building

It was deemed significant for its architecture: "The church is the best of very few examples in Green County of the Gothic Revival style."
