= Mell, Kentucky =

Unincorporated community in Kentucky, United States

- Unincorporated community
- Location within Kentucky Location within the United States
- Coordinates: 37°6′44″N 85°31′43″W
- Country: United States
- State: Kentucky
- County: Green
- Elevation: 1,007 ft (307 m)
- Time zone: UTC-6 (Central (CST))
  - Summer (DST): UTC-5 (CDT)
- GNIS feature ID: 508587

Mell is an unincorporated community in Green, Kentucky, United States.
