= David Edwards House =

- U.S. National Register of Historic Places
- Location within Kentucky Location within the United States
- Nearest city: Exie, Kentucky
- Coordinates: 37°06′54″N 85°33′21″W
- Area: 0.3 acres (0.12 ha)
- Built: 1845
- Architectural style: Federal
- MPS: Green County MRA
- NRHP reference No.: 84001506
- Added to NRHP: August 24, 1984

The David Edwards House, off Kentucky Route 745 in Green County, Kentucky near Exie, Kentucky, was built in 1845. It was listed on the National Register of Historic Places in 1984.

It is a one-story four-bay brick house which was assessed to have "one of the best examples in the county of Federal domestic architecture; the interior is especially significant."

It was built by David Edwards, from Columbia, at age 15; David died at Battle of Shiloh in 1862 at age 32. It was later owned by George L. Edwards, a murderer and a famous outlaw of Green County.

A second contributing building on the property is an "unusual" stepped chimney log smokehouse with half-dovetailing.

== See also ==
- Edwards House (Exie, Kentucky)
