= Green County High School =

Location
- 302 Brummal Avenue; Greensburg, Green County, Kentucky 42743; United States
- 37.256002°N 85.488747°W

Information
- Type: Public
- School district: Green County Schools
- Principal: Sara Tucker
- Teaching staff: 32.75 (FTE)
- Grades: 9-12
- Enrollment: 503 (2023–2024)
- Student to teacher ratio: 15.36
- Colors: Green and gold
- Mascot: Dragons
- Website: https://sites.google.com/green.kyschools.us/gchs/home

Green County High School is a public high school in Greensburg, Kentucky, United States.

== Notable alumni ==
- Dakota Meyer (Class of 2006)- United States Marine, received the Medal of Honor for actions in the War in Afghanistan
