= Green County Court Clerk's Office =

- Court Clerk's Office-County & Circuit
- U.S. National Register of Historic Places
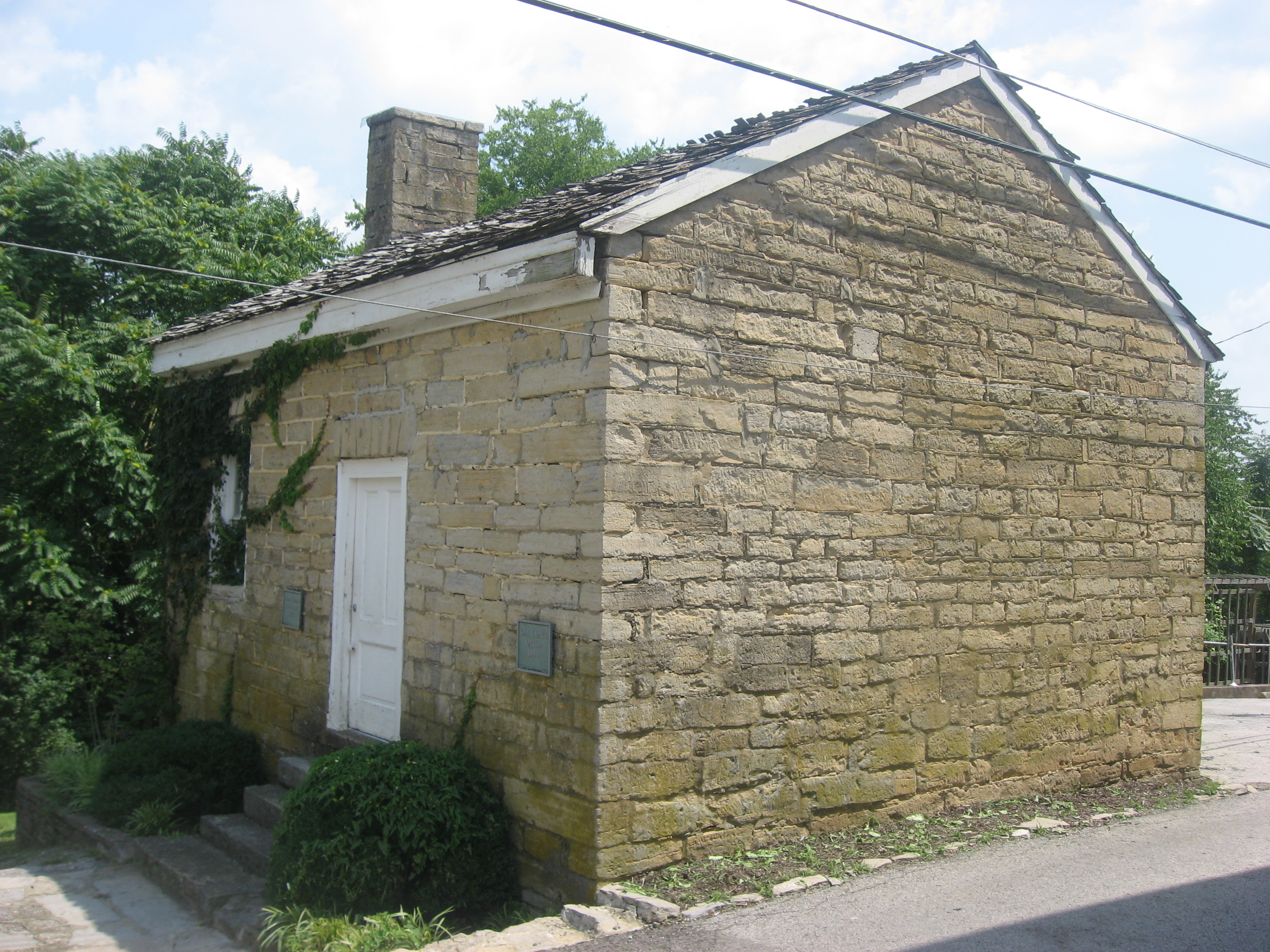

- Location within Kentucky Location within the United States
- Location: East Court St., Greensburg, Kentucky
- Coordinates: 37°15′37″N 85°30′04″W
- Area: less than one acre
- Built: 1818
- Architectural style: Federal
- MPS: Early Stone Buildings of Kentucky Outer Bluegrass and Pennyrile TR
- NRHP reference No.: 87000176
- Added to NRHP: January 8, 1987

The Court Clerk's Office-County & Circuit, on East Court St. in Greensburg, Kentucky, was built in 1818. It was listed on the National Register of Historic Places in 1987.

It is Federal in style, and was built of dry stone construction, the best building method available during Kentucky's settlement period. The building served as the clerk's office until 1842. After 1877 it was the home of "Aunt Eunice", a former slave. The building was later bought and repaired by the City of Greensburg.
