= Edwards House (Exie, Kentucky) =

- U.S. National Register of Historic Places
- Location within Kentucky Location within the United States
- Nearest city: Exie, Kentucky
- Coordinates: 37°07′41″N 85°32′08″W
- Area: 0.2 acres (0.081 ha)
- Built: 1840s
- Architectural style: Greek Revival
- MPS: Green County MRA
- NRHP reference No.: 84001507
- Added to NRHP: August 24, 1984

The Edwards House, on Kentucky Route 745 in Green County, Kentucky, United States, near Exie, Kentucky, was built in the 1840s. It was listed on the National Register of Historic Places in 1984.

The house was deemed "one of the best examples in the county of both the Greek Revival style and the dogtrot log house form."

It is a two-story, five-bay log house. It has a slope-shouldered stone chimney on its north end while the stone chimney on its south end had collapsed by 1984. It has a two-tiered portico. It has Greek Revival surrounds to its windows and doors.

== See also ==
- David Edwards House, nearby, also listed on the National Register
