= Anderson House (Haskingsville, Kentucky) =

Historic house in Kentucky, United States

- U.S. National Register of Historic Places
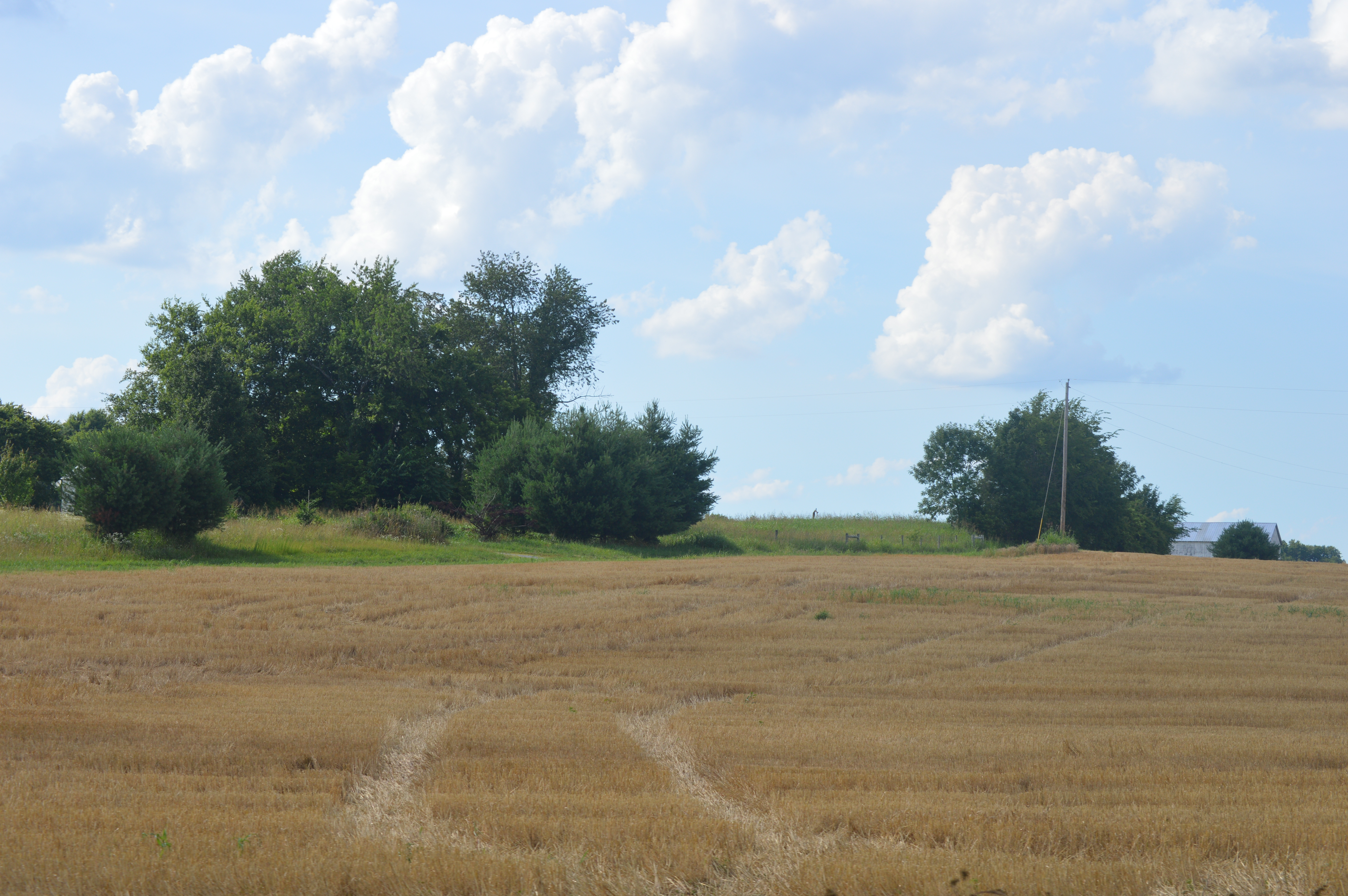
- Site of former house

- Location within Kentucky Location within the United States
- Nearest city: Haskingsville, Kentucky
- Coordinates: 37°11′37″N 85°23′09″W
- Area: 0.4 acres (0.16 ha)
- Built: c.1800
- Architectural style: Federal
- MPS: Green County MRA
- NRHP reference No.: 84001496
- Added to NRHP: August 24, 1984

The Anderson House on Kentucky Route 1913 near Haskingsville, Kentucky was listed on the National Register of Historic Places in 1984.

It was a 1 1/2-story, five-bay central passage plan house, built of brick laid in Flemish bond.

The house is no longer on the site.
