= Mt. Gilead Christian Church =

Historic church in Kentucky, United States

- U.S. National Register of Historic Places
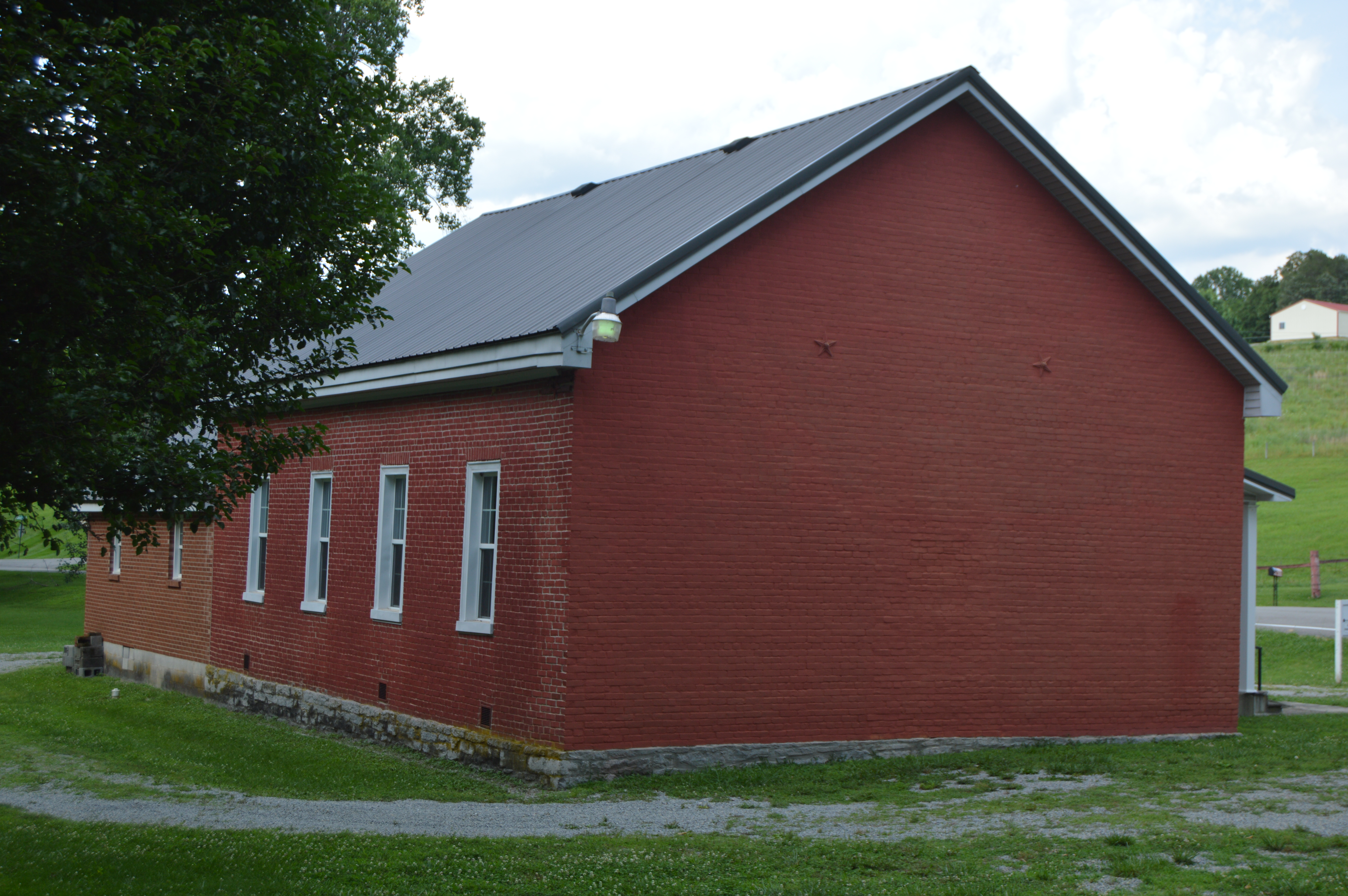
- Rear and southern end

- Location within Kentucky Location within the United States
- Nearest city: Haskingsville, Kentucky
- Coordinates: 37°10′14″N 85°22′56″W
- Area: 2.2 acres (0.89 ha)
- Built: 1864
- Architectural style: Federal
- MPS: Green County MRA
- NRHP reference No.: 84001519
- Added to NRHP: August 24, 1984

Mt. Gilead Christian Church is a historic church in Haskingsville, Kentucky. It was built in 1864 and added to the National Register of Historic Places in 1984.

It is a one-story brick church with brick laid in 1/5 American bond.
