= Francis Cowherd House =

- U.S. National Register of Historic Places
- Location within Kentucky Location within the United States
- Nearest city: Greensburg, Kentucky
- Coordinates: 37°18′41″N 85°30′44″W
- Area: 0.2 acres (0.081 ha)
- Built: c.1830s
- Architectural style: Federal
- MPS: Green County MRA
- NRHP reference No.: 85000908
- Added to NRHP: April 19, 1985

The Francis Cowherd House, off U.S. Route 68 near Greensburg, Kentucky, was probably built in the 1830s. It was listed on the National Register of Historic Places in 1985.

It is a house with "fine Federal interior woodwork. It is a one-story, seven-bay brick house, with brick laid in Flemish bond. It has end chimneys which are partially exterior. A second story, probably having five bays, was destroyed by a tornado "recently" (as of 1984).

== See also ==
- Jonathan Cowherd Jr. House, also NRHP-listed in Kentucky
