= Grab, Kentucky =

Unincorporated community in Kentucky, United States

- Unincorporated community
- Location within Kentucky Location within the United States
- Coordinates: 37°13′33″N 85°36′6″W
- Country: United States
- State: Kentucky
- County: Green
- Elevation: 774 ft (236 m)
- Time zone: UTC-6 (Central (CST))
  - Summer (DST): UTC-5 (CDT)
- GNIS feature ID: 508116

Grab is an unincorporated community in Green County, Kentucky, United States.

A post office was established in the community in 1906, with store-owner Daniel K. Cramer, postmaster. The origins of the name Grab are unclear. Some believe it refers to Cramer's practice of selling candy by the handful, while others believe it describes the activity of shoplifters in the country store.
