= Roachville, Kentucky =

Unincorporated community in Kentucky, United States

- Unincorporated community
- Location within Kentucky Location within the United States
- Coordinates: 37°14′26″N 85°25′25″W
- Country: United States
- State: Kentucky
- County: Green
- Elevation: 686 ft (209 m)
- Time zone: UTC-6 (Central (CST))
  - Summer (DST): UTC-5 (CDT)
- GNIS feature ID: 508945

Roachville is an unincorporated community in Green County, Kentucky, United States.
