= Edward House =

Edward House may refer to:

- Edward House, Karachi, Pakistan
- Edward Howard House (1836–1901), American journalist
- Edward M. House (1858–1938), American diplomat
  - SS Edward M. House, a Liberty ship
- Edward House (Australian politician) (1916–1971), member of the Western Australian Legislative Council
- Eddie House (born 1978), American basketball player
- Ted House (born 1959), American circuit judge and politician in Missouri
- Son House (Edward James House Jr., 1902–1988), American Delta blues singer and guitarist

== See also ==
- Edwards House (disambiguation)
