= Herman W. Rattliff =

American politician

Member of the Kentucky House of Representatives
- In office January 1, 1968 – January 1, 1987

Personal details
- Born: Herman Willard Rattliff; April 2, 1926 Green County, Kentucky, U.S.
- Died: May 29, 2014 (aged 88) Campbellsville, Kentucky, U.S.
- Party: Republican
- Spouse: Jewell Merritt (m. 1951)

Herman Willard Rattliff (April 2, 1926 – May 29, 2014) was an American politician. A member of the Republican Party, he served in the Kentucky House of Representatives from 1968 to 1987.

== Life and career ==
Rattliff was born in Green County, Kentucky, the son of James William Rattliff and Estell Dobson. He served in the United States Army during World War II, holding the rank of staff sergeant. During his military service, was awarded the World War II Victory Medal and the Good Conduct Medal. After his discharge, he worked as a farmer, and was a businessman.

Rattliff served in the Kentucky House of Representatives from 1968 to 1987.

== Personal life and death ==
In 1951, Rattliff married Jewell Merritt. Their marriage lasted until Rattliff's death in 2014.

Rattliff died on May 29, 2014, in Campbellsville, Kentucky, at the age of 92.
