= Thompsie Edwards House =

- U.S. National Register of Historic Places
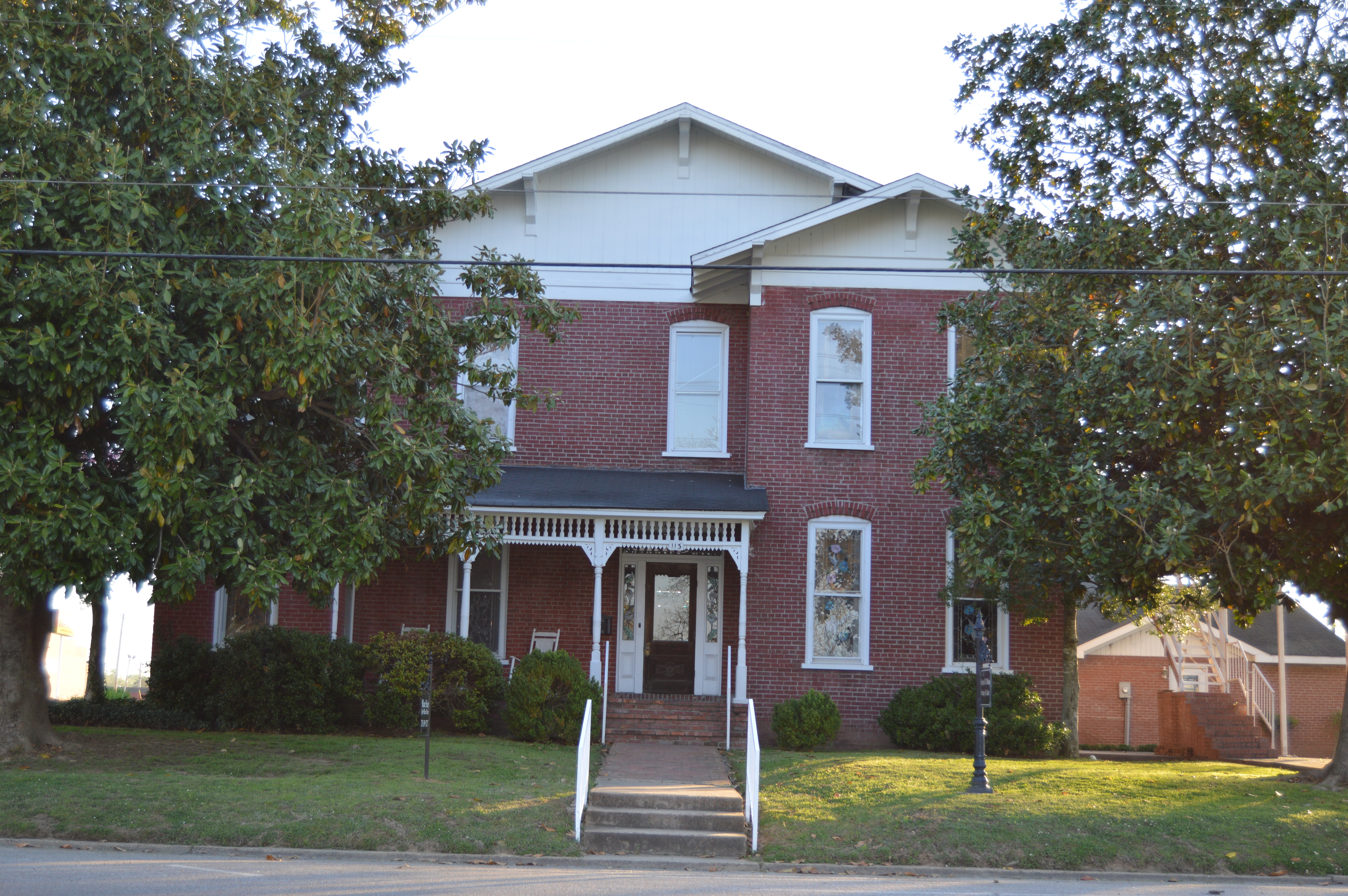
- The house in 2014

- Location within Tennessee Location within the United States
- Location: 113 Main Street, Lexington, Tennessee
- Coordinates: 35°38′53″N 88°23′30″W
- Area: less than one acre
- Built: 1894
- Architectural style: Late Victorian
- NRHP reference No.: 83003039
- Added to NRHP: June 30, 1983

The Thompsie Edwards House is a historic house in Lexington, Tennessee, U.S.. It was built in 1894 for Thompsie Edwards, a livery yard owner, banker and Republican politician. The porch was designed in the Eastlake architectural style. The property has been listed on the National Register of Historic Places since June 30, 1983.
