= Downtown Greensburg Historic District (Greensburg, Kentucky) =

Historic district in Kentucky, United States

- U.S. National Register of Historic Places
- U.S. Historic district
- Location within Kentucky Location within the United States
- Location: Greensburg, Kentucky
- Built: 1792
- Architectural style: Early Republic, Late 19th And 20th Century Revivals
- MPS: Green County MRA
- NRHP reference No.: 02001466
- Added to NRHP: February 28, 2003

- Old Courthouse
- U.S. National Register of Historic Places
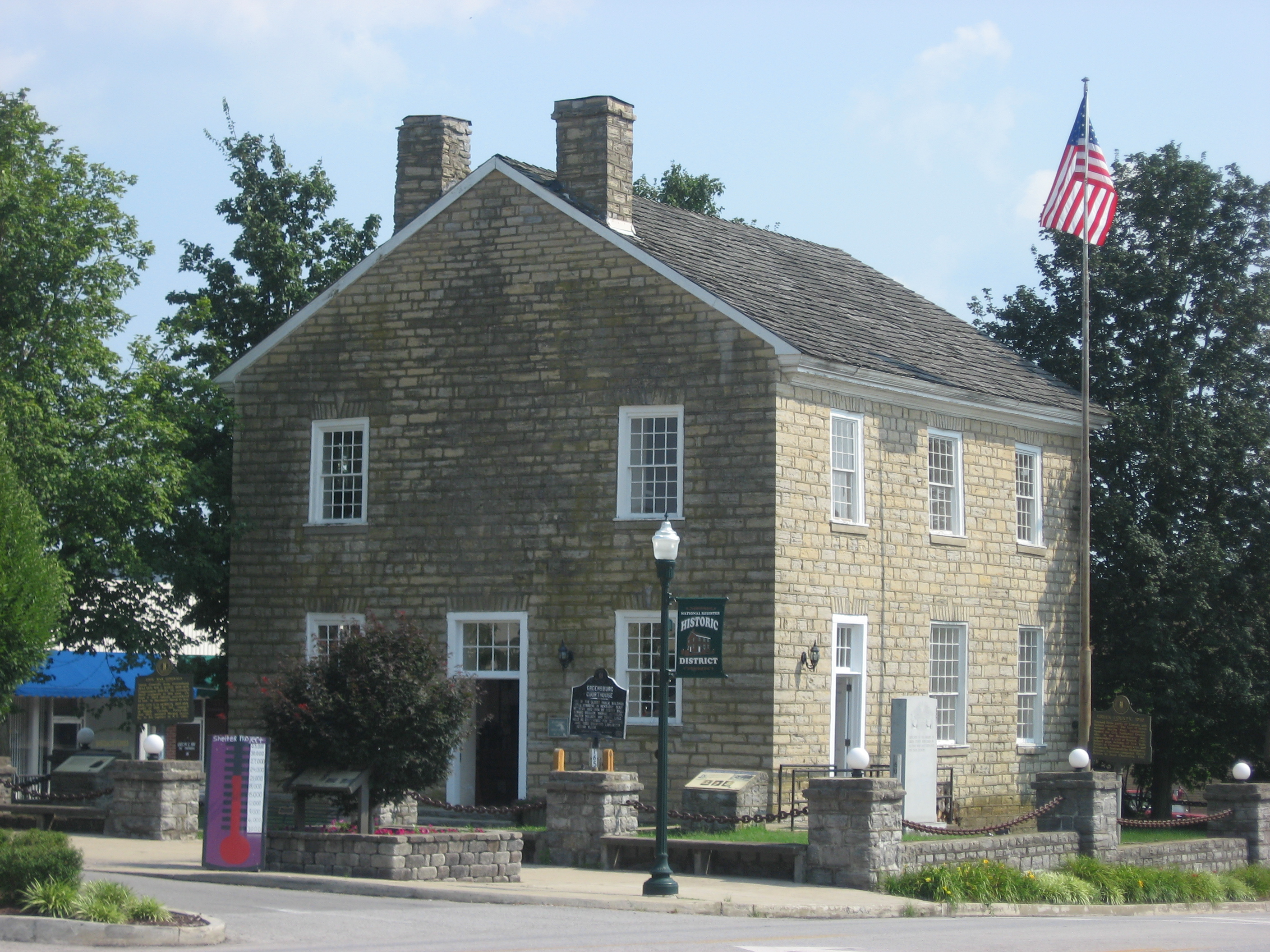
- Old Courthouse

- Location within Kentucky Location within the United States
- Location: Greensburg, Kentucky
- Coordinates: 37°15′38″N 85°30′4″W
- NRHP reference No.: 72000533
- Added to NRHP: April 10, 1972

The Downtown Greensburg Historic District in Greensburg, Kentucky, the county seat of Green County, is a historic district on the National Register of Historic Places. It consists of 47 contributing properties.

Greensburg was founded in 1794. The town site was originally called Glover's Station, named after its founder John Glover in 1779. The name change was due to the founding of Green County, and renaming the town to reflect the county's name. The county name was to honor American Revolutionary War General Nathanael Greene.

Due to their proximity to the Cumberland Trace, the town and the county grew rapidly. Green County's population jumped from 1,000 in 1790 to 6,096 in 1800, 6,735 in 1810, and 11,943 in 1820, with its highest population being 14,212 in 1840, when the county included what is now Taylor County.

Most of the buildings in the district are of the Federal or Greek Revival architectural style. Due to the heyday of the town and county being between 1794 and 1840, almost all the outstanding architecture is pre-1840, as after that year the population decreased in favor of other areas in Kentucky, as the Cumberland Trace gave way to railroads and steamboats for transportation. Although it escaped any conflict during the Civil War, it still was impacted by the economic downturn felt by the rest of Kentucky after the War. It also means that the basic structure of Kentucky seats built around 1800 is largely intact.

The center of the historic district features the old courthouse, which was separately listed on the National Register 31 years before the district itself. It was the second courthouse the county had. It was built by five men between 1802 and 1804, and was used for 130 years, ceasing to be an active courthouse in 1931. The Jane Todd Crawford Library was on the second floor. It is the oldest courthouse west of the Allegheny Mountains. The limestone used in its construction was quarried locally. Thomas Metcalfe, future Kentucky state governor, was one of the builders of the Old Courthouse building. It is the oldest courthouse west of the Appalachians.

== Gallery ==
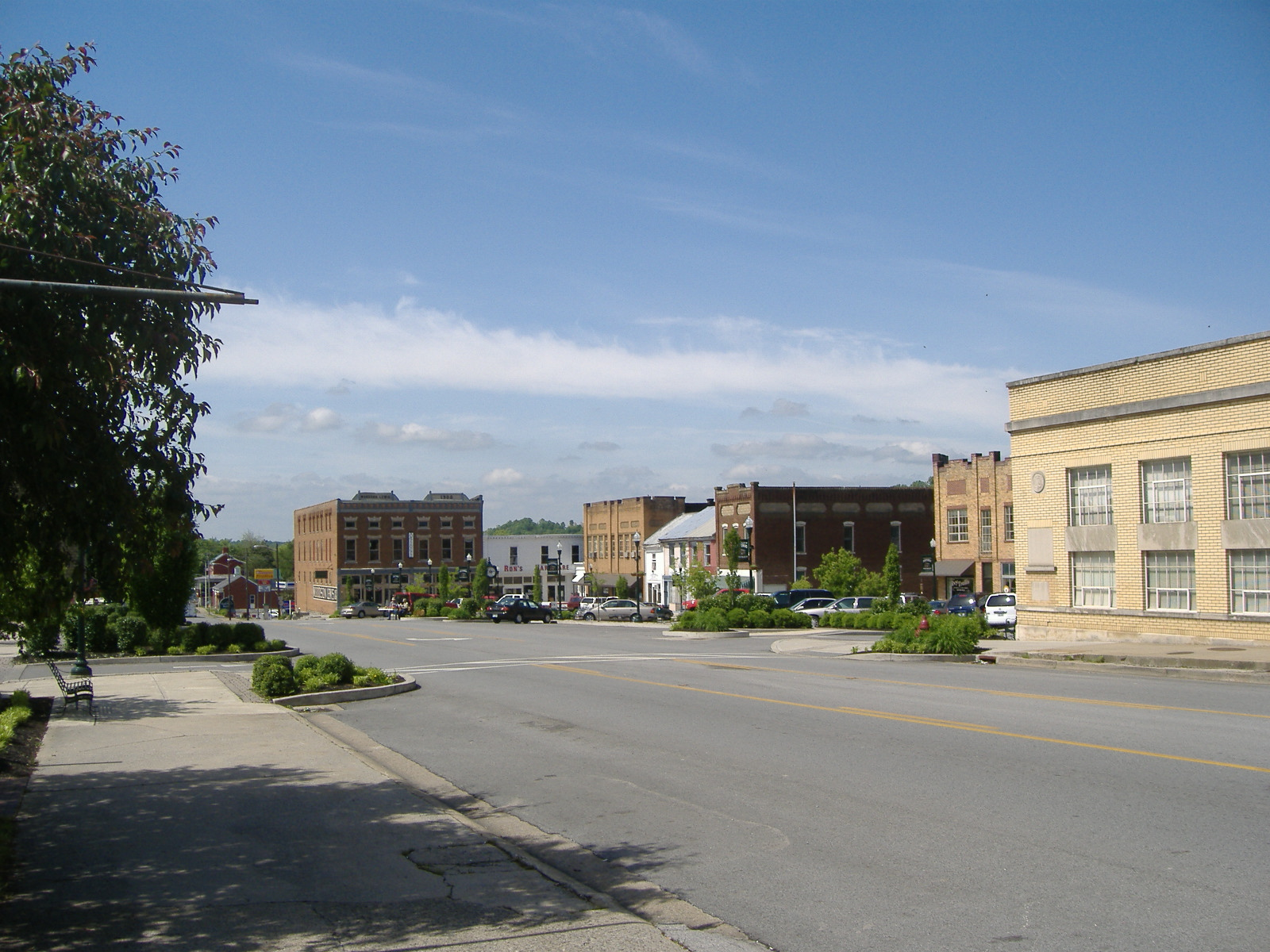
Business area
