= Edwards-Fowler House =

Historic house in Tennessee, United States

- U.S. National Register of Historic Places
- Location within Tennessee Location within the United States
- Nearest city: Lake City, Tennessee
- Coordinates: 36°10′18″N 84°10′3″W
- Area: 6 acres (2.4 ha)
- Built: 1837
- Architectural style: Federal
- NRHP reference No.: 75001726
- Added to NRHP: May 29, 1975

The Edwards-Fowler House in Rocky Top, Tennessee (formerly known as Coal Creek and later Lake City) was built between 1835 and 1838 on land given to Nicely Ross Edwards and husband Edward C. Edwards by Nicely's father, James Ross. Ross gave the couple 300 acres (120 ha) and several slaves, who provided labor to build the house, which has been called The Hemlocks after the two massive hemlock trees that grow in front of the house. The Edwards family owned the house from 1838 until about 1900 when the Fowler family, originally from Knoxville, Tennessee, bought the house. The house has remained structurally unchanged for over 175 years, making the Edwards Fowler house the oldest and only Federal-style house in Anderson County, Tennessee.

The house was constructed of locally quarried limestone and bricks made on the site. Foundations of slave cabins exist behind the house. It was placed on the National Register of Historic Places on May 29, 1975.
