= Rock S. Edwards Farmstead =

- U.S. National Register of Historic Places
- U.S. Historic district
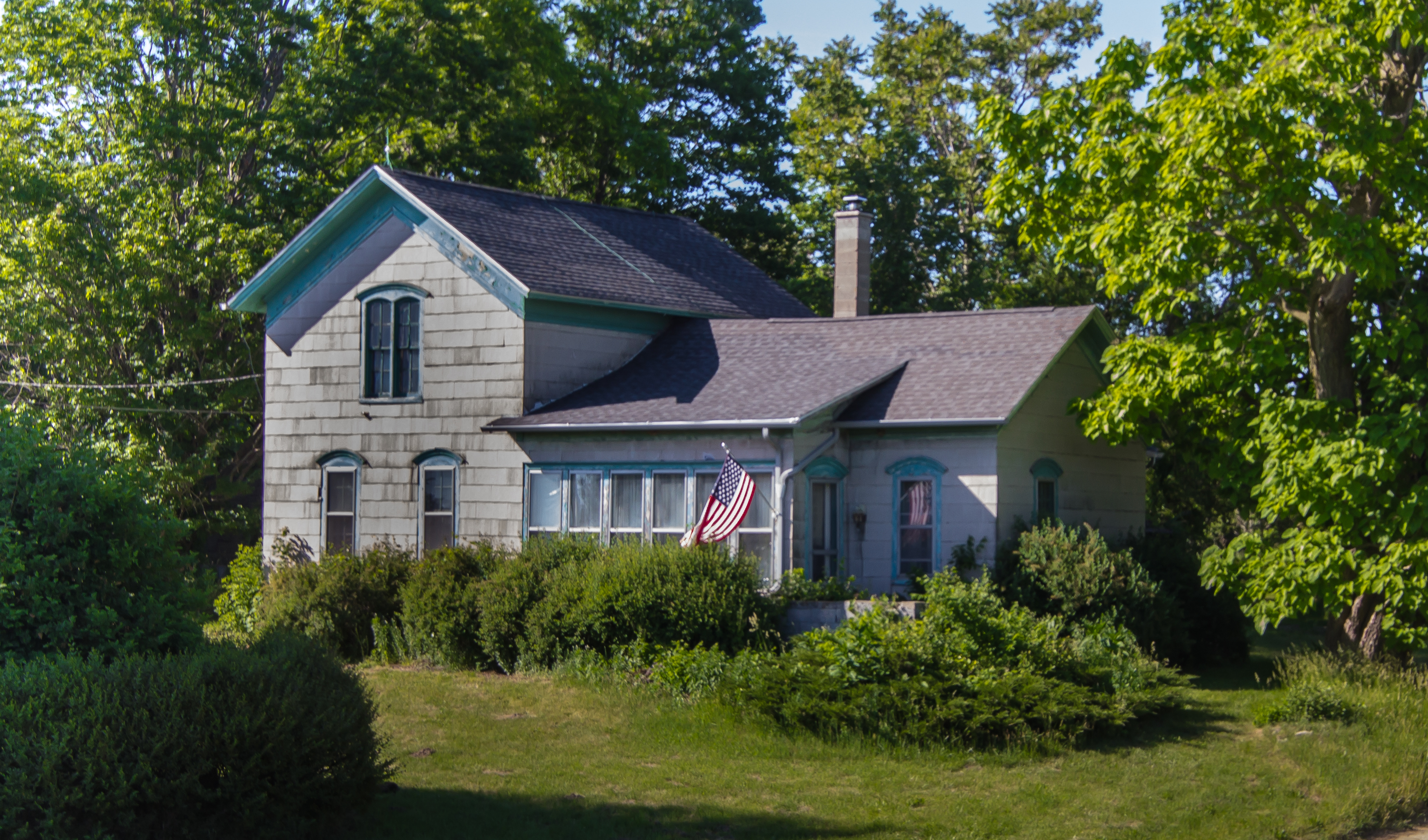

- Location within Michigan Location within the United States
- Interactive map
- Location: 3503 Rock Edwards Rd., Sodus Township, Michigan
- Coordinates: 42°3′13″N 86°22′21″W
- Area: 6 acres (2.4 ha)
- NRHP reference No.: 95000868
- Added to NRHP: July 21, 1995

The Rock S. Edwards Farmstead is a collection of farm buildings located at 3503 Edwards Road (now Sodus Parkway) in Sodus Township, Michigan. It was listed on the National Register of Historic Places in 1995.

== History ==
Rock Savage Edwards was born in 1829 in Shropshire, England. He emigrated to the United States when he was 28, and worked on farms in Ohio and Michigan to save money to purchase his own farm. In 1860, he purchased this farm for $420, likely raising grain for market in nearby Benton Harbor, and soon after planting fruit trees. In 1862, he enlisted to fight in the Civil War, and was wounded and left for dead in the Battle of Antietam. He returned home for a short time, then rejoined the fight, and was discharged in 1865. He married Miss Lydia E. Fox of Ravenna, Ohio and returned to his farm.

Edwards quickly put much of his farm into cultivation, and soon was able to raise enough money from agriculture to build the substantial house and barn on the property. By the early 1870s, the farm had producing orchards, as well as a dairy operation, sheep, chickens, and fields of wheat, oats, and rye. Rock Edwards farmed the property until 1904, when he deeded it to his nephew, Edward C. Edwards, who farmed until his death in 1923. The farm passed to his son, Charles Edwards, but fruit production went into decline in the 1940s. Major agricultural work on the farm ceased after that, and the farm was eventually passed to Edward's daughters Virginia Handy and Eleanor Handy Blankenship. Much of the acreage was deeded to the state on the construction of the nearby freeway, but the collection of farm buildings remains intact.

== Description ==
The Rock S. Edwards Farmstead is sited on approximately 5.5 acres of sandy, rolling land, and contains an 1870s farmhouse and barn along with thirteen other outbuildings and structures, and the remains of other structures which have been demolished. The farmhouse is a two-story gabled structure with a row of windows across the front where an open porch originally existed. It has a fieldstone foundation. The first floor contains a living room, parlor, kitchen, pantry, and two bedrooms. Two more bedrooms are on the second story. The barn, sited nearby, has been enlarged multiple times from its original c. 1870 configuration. A silo, constructed in 1945, is built alongside the barn.

The farmstead also contains a packing shed, a garage and corncrib, a blockhouse/tractor shed, two small wood-frame houses used by handymen or migrant workers, a granary, pigpen, and several chicken coops.
