= Edwards-Swayze House =

Historic house in Iowa, United States

- U.S. National Register of Historic Places
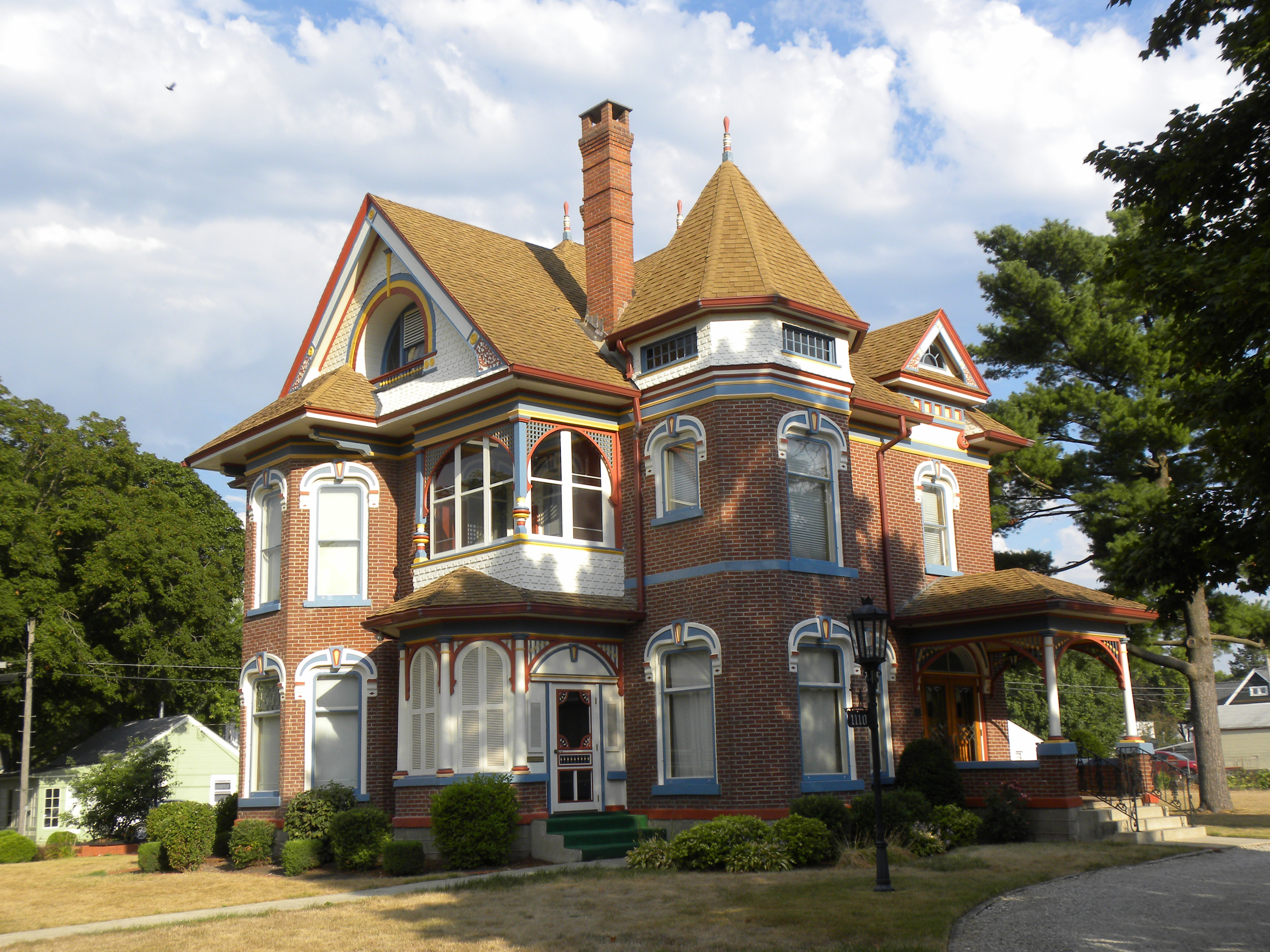

- Location within Iowa Location within the United States
- Location: 1110 9th St. Nevada, Iowa
- Coordinates: 42°01′19″N 93°26′55″W
- Area: less than one acre
- Built: 1878
- NRHP reference No.: 78001262
- Added to NRHP: November 14, 1978

The Edwards-Swayze House is a historic building located in Nevada, Iowa, United States. Clayton F. Edwards, a local merchant, had this house built in 1878. He sold the house to Emma Swayze, the wife of banker W.F. Swayze, in 1890 when he relocated to Kennard, Nebraska. The house follows a vernacular form with elements of the Queen Anne style that were not fully integrated or carried though. The 2 1/2-story brick structure features an irregular plan, octagonal turret, hip roof, shingled gable ends, enclosed porches, and window hoods. It was listed on the National Register of Historic Places in 1978.
