= Summersville, Kentucky =

Census-designated place in Kentucky, United States

- Census-designated place
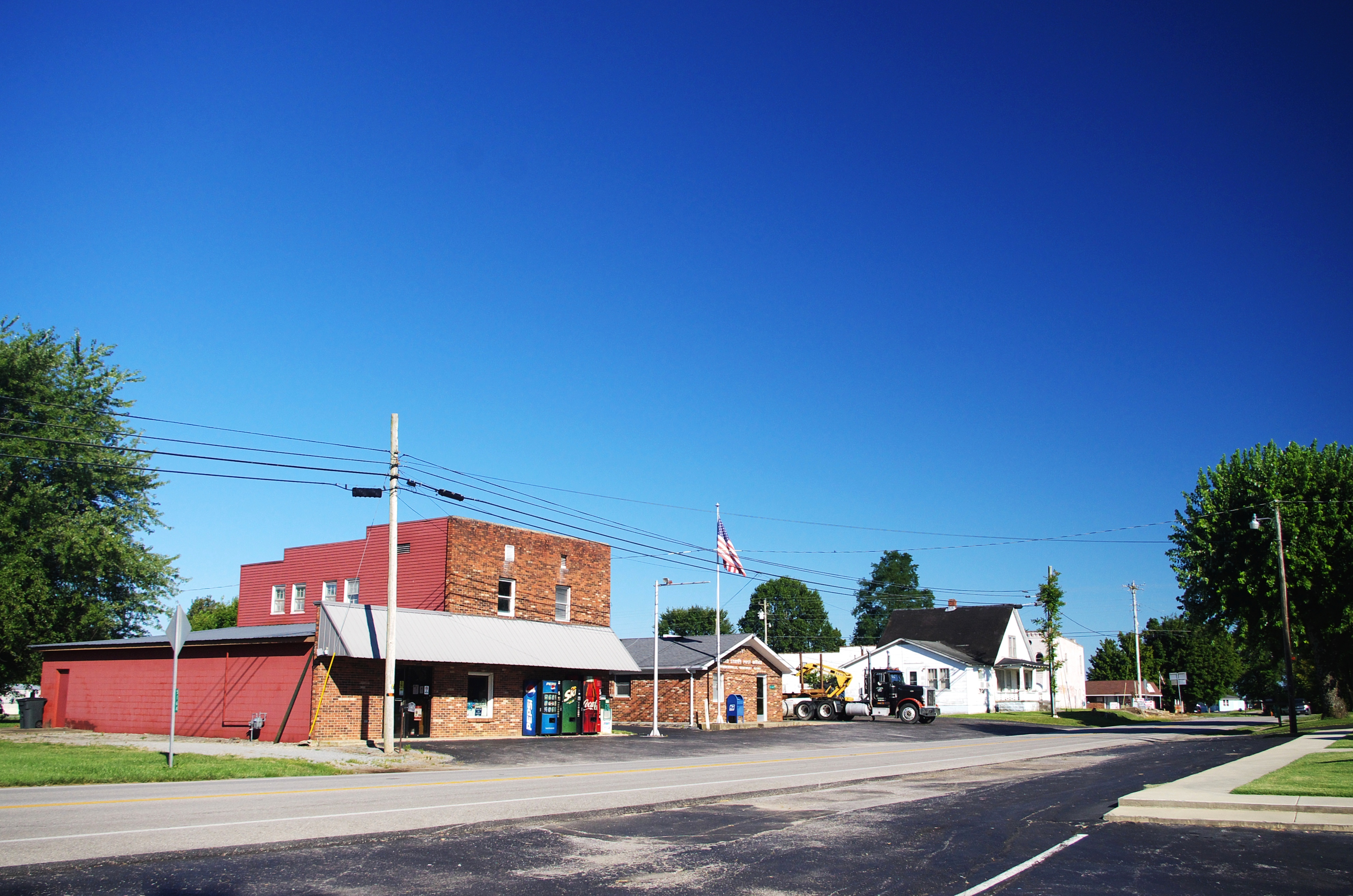
- Businesses along KY 61

- Location within Kentucky Location within the United States
- Coordinates: 37°19′34″N 85°32′40″W
- Country: United States
- State: Kentucky
- County: Green

Area
  - Total: 2.89 sq mi (7.49 km^{2})
  - Land: 2.89 sq mi (7.48 km^{2})
  - Water: 0.0039 sq mi (0.01 km^{2})
- Elevation: 804 ft (245 m)

Population (2020)
  - Total: 551
  - Density: 190.7/sq mi (73.62/km^{2})
- Time zone: UTC-6 (Central (CST))
  - Summer (DST): UTC-5 (CDT)
- ZIP code: 42782
- FIPS code: 21-74604
- GNIS feature ID: 504784

Summersville is a census-designated place (CDP) and unincorporated community in Green County, Kentucky, United States. As of the 2020 census, Summersville had a population of 551.

It lies along Routes 61 and 323, 6 miles (10 km) northwest of the city of Greensburg, the county seat of Green County. Its elevation is 804 feet (245 m). It has a post office with the ZIP code 42782. Annually in late July the residents host a festival named "Summersville Days".

Summersville was incorporated in 1817.

== Demographics ==
Historical population
| Census | Pop. | Note | %± |
|---|---|---|---|
| 2020 | 551 | | — |
U.S. Decennial Census
