= Chewning House (Hendersonville, North Carolina) =

- U.S. National Register of Historic Places
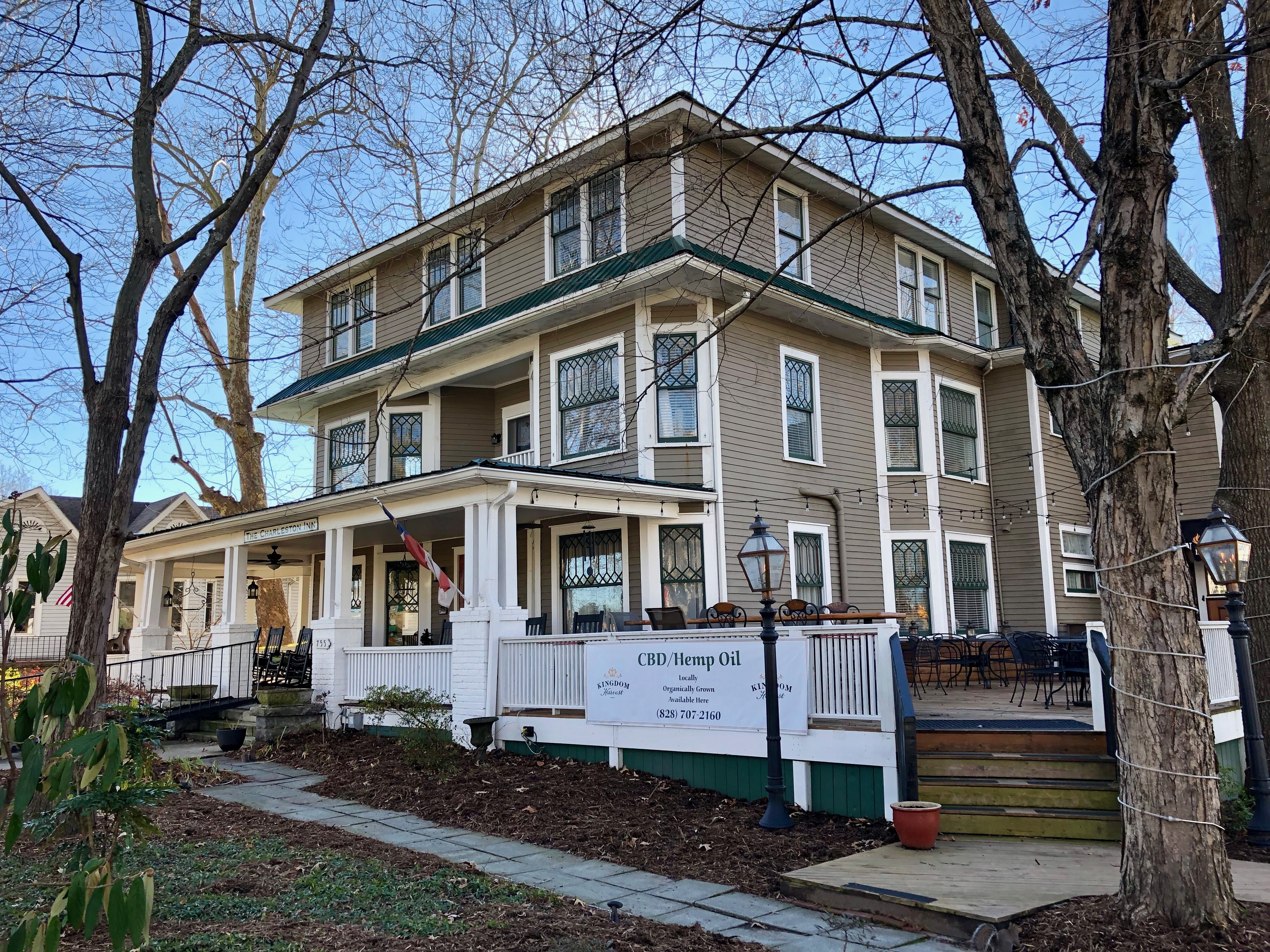
- Claddagh Inn, January 2019

- Location within North Carolina Location within the United States
- Location: 755 N. Main St., Hendersonville, North Carolina
- Coordinates: 35°19′14″N 82°27′41″W
- Area: 0.4 acres (0.16 ha)
- Built: c. 1906, 1912–1922
- Architectural style: Classical Revival
- MPS: Hendersonville MPS
- NRHP reference No.: 89000034
- Added to NRHP: February 24, 1989

Chewning House, also known as the McCurry Hotel, Charleston Boarding House, and Claddagh Inn, is a historic hotel building located at Hendersonville, Henderson County, North Carolina. The house was built before 1906, and enlarged between 1912 and 1922 from a two-story building to the present three-story building with Classical Revival style design elements. It features a one-story hip roofed wraparound porch.

It was listed on the National Register of Historic Places in 1989.
