= Chewning House (Donansburg, Kentucky) =

Historic house in Kentucky, United States

- U.S. National Register of Historic Places
- Location within Kentucky Location within the United States
- Location: KY 88, Donansburg, Kentucky
- Coordinates: 37°14′13″N 85°37′35″W
- Area: 0.2 acres (0.081 ha)
- Built: 1826
- Architectural style: Greek Revival, Federal
- MPS: Green County MRA
- NRHP reference No.: 84001502
- Added to NRHP: August 24, 1984

The Chewning House in Green County, Kentucky is listed on the National Register of Historic Places. The property is located at the northwest corner of the intersection of Kentucky Route 88 and New Salem Road, known as the Donansburg intersection.

It was a two-story dogtrot-style house built in the 1826-1850 period and includes elements of Greek Revival and Federal style.

Google Streetview as of June 2013 shows the house no longer exists; a chimney remained.
