= Chewning House (Lawrence, Kansas) =

Historic building in Kansas, United States

- U.S. National Register of Historic Places
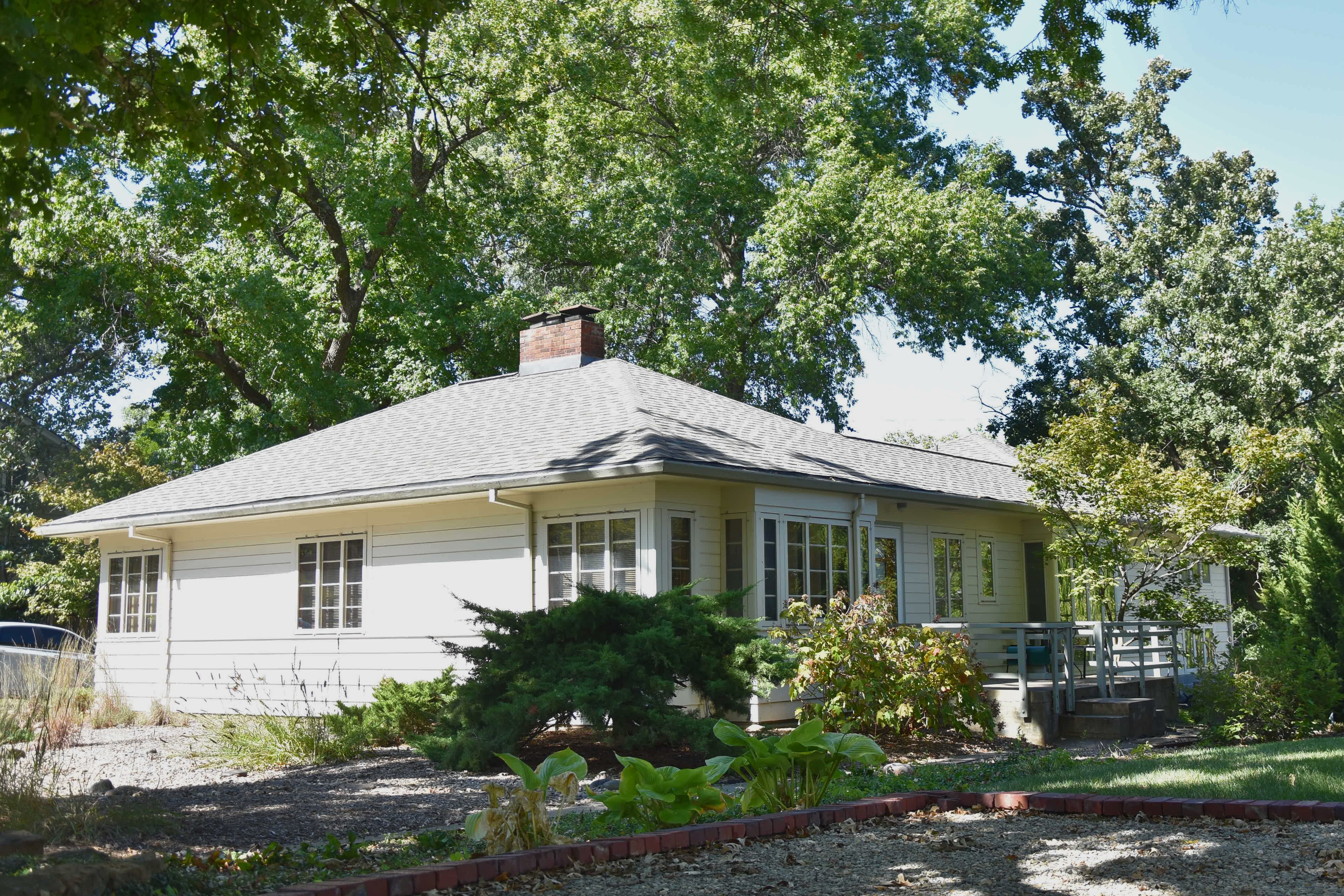
- Chewning House in 2025

- Location within Kansas
- Location: 1510 Stratford Rd., Lawrence, Kansas
- Coordinates: 38°57′42″N 95°15′11″W
- Built: 1936
- Architect: George M. Beal
- NRHP reference No.: 100003443
- Added to NRHP: March 7, 2019

The Chewning House in Lawrence, Kansas, was built in 1936. It was listed on the National Register of Historic Places in 2019.

It is located at 1510 Stratford Rd. in the West hills neighborhood in Lawrence, west of the University of Kansas in Lawrence.

It was designed by architect George M. Beal, who was chair of the Architecture program at the university.

According to the Kansas Historical Society,

The house is one of the 1,000 houses built in the United States as part of the General Electric "New American Home" program, which involved General Electric and the Federal Housing Administration (FHA). The program was started to stimulate the economy and put people to work during the Great Depression and aimed to utilize local financiers, builders and suppliers. It is the only known GE "New American Home" in the immediate vicinity of Lawrence and one of the earliest examples of the Modern movement in residential architecture in Lawrence. It is being nominated under the Historic Resources of Lawrence Multiple Property Documentation Form. It predates the "Lawrence Modern, 1945–1975" MPS amendment, but fits into the context as being modern in design and is also associated with the Federal Housing Administration.
