= Webbs, Kentucky =

Unincorporated community in Kentucky, United States

- Unincorporated community
- Location within Kentucky Location within the United States
- Coordinates: 37°15′32″N 85°36′7″W
- Country: United States
- State: Kentucky
- County: Green
- Elevation: 709 ft (216 m)
- Time zone: UTC-6 (Central (CST))
  - Summer (DST): UTC-5 (CST)
- GNIS feature ID: 509328

Webbs is an unincorporated community in Green County, Kentucky, United States.
