= Exie, Kentucky =

Unincorporated community in Kentucky, U.S.

- Unincorporated community
- Location within Kentucky Location within the United States
- Coordinates: 37°9′35″N 85°32′9″W
- Country: United States
- State: Kentucky
- County: Green
- Elevation: 801 ft (244 m)
- Time zone: UTC-6 (Central (CST))
  - Summer (DST): UTC-5 (CDT)
- GNIS feature ID: 507965

Exie is an unincorporated community in Green County, Kentucky, United States.

== Geography ==
The community is located at the intersection of U.S. Route 68 with Kentucky Routes 487 and 745, south of the city of Greensburg, the county seat of Green County. Its elevation is 801 feet (245 m).

== History ==
A post office was established in the community in 1890, and named for schoolteacher Exie Dowdy.
