= Haskingsville, Kentucky =

Unincorporated community in Kentucky, United States

- Unincorporated community
- Location within Kentucky Location within the United States
- Coordinates: 37°11′13″N 85°23′43″W
- Country: United States
- State: Kentucky
- County: Green
- Elevation: 640 ft (200 m)
- Time zone: UTC-6 (Central (CST))
  - Summer (DST): UTC-5 (CST)
- GNIS feature ID: 508202

Haskingsville is an unincorporated community in Green County, Kentucky, United States.
