= Green County, Kentucky =

County in Kentucky, United States

- County
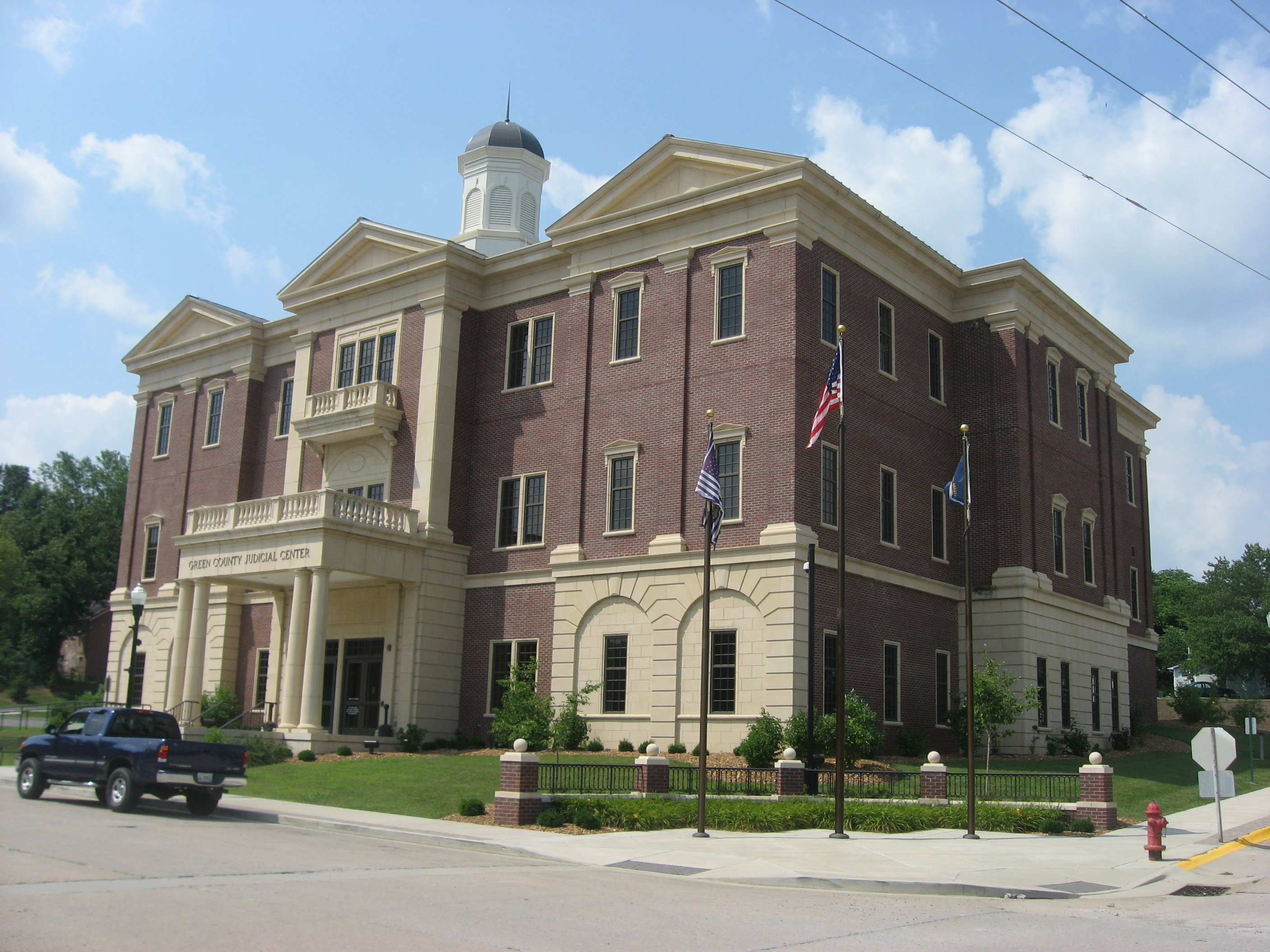
- Green County Justice Center in Greensburg, Kentucky.

- Location within the U.S. state of Kentucky
- Coordinates: 37°16′N 85°33′W
- Country: United States
- State: Kentucky
- Founded: December 20, 1792
- Named for: Nathanael Greene
- Seat: Greensburg
- Largest city: Greensburg

Government
  - Judge/Executive: John Frank (R)

Area
  - Total: 289 sq mi (750 km^{2})
  - Land: 286 sq mi (740 km^{2})
  - Water: 2.8 sq mi (7.3 km^{2}) 1.0%

Population (2020)
  - Total: 11,107
  - Estimate (2025): 11,644 ▲
  - Density: 38.8/sq mi (15.0/km^{2})
- Time zone: UTC−6 (Central)
  - Summer (DST): UTC−5 (CDT)
- Congressional district: 2nd
- Website: greencounty.ky.gov

Green County is a county located in the U.S. state of Kentucky. Its county seat and only municipality is Greensburg. Green was a prohibition or dry county until 2015.

== History ==
Green County was formed in 1792 from portions of Lincoln and Nelson Counties. Green was the 16th Kentucky county in order of formation. The county is named for Revolutionary War hero General Nathanael Greene, but the reason why the final E is missing is unknown.

Three courthouses have served Green County. In 1804, a brick building replaced an earlier log structure, and while no longer operational, it stands in the Downtown Greensburg Historic District as the oldest courthouse building in the commonwealth. The present courthouse dates from 1931.

The Cumberland Trace runs through Green County. This early road started in Lincoln County, Kentucky, and went to Nashville. (1)

Three counties (Cumberland, Adair, Taylor) were formed entirely from Green County, along with a portion of four more (Pulaski, Barren, Hart, and Metcalfe). (1)

Green River flows east to west through Green County. The Paddle Trail provides canoe rentals. In the early history of the county, flatboats would take tobacco from Green County, to New Orleans. There, farmers would sell their tobacco, sell their boat (for wood), and walk back to Green County. (1)

Green County was without a sheriff from 1879 until 1918, due to a dispute over railroad taxes. Individuals were elected sheriff, but were unable to post enough bond to cover not collecting railroad property taxes, and the office was declared vacant. From 1896 until 1915, a total of 34 murders were committed in the county. (1)

An oil boom from 1958 until the early 1960s gave the county an economic lift. Temporary air strips were built in the communities of Summersville, and Pierce. (1)

An adobe brick house was uncovered in Greensburg during 2007. The structure is thought to be the only "mud brick house" in Kentucky. (1)

The Goose Creek Footbridge connects the town square to what was once the train depot. Built in the late 1920s, the structure is 445 feet long, 40 feet high at its highest point, and has a plank walkway which is five feet wide. (1)

The community of Summersville is home to the Skyline Drive-In Theater, which plays movies during the summer. The community used to be home to Green River Live, a music venue which shut down soon into the COVID-19 pandemic. (1)

A public hanging in Greensburg on September 21, 1841, attracted a crowd recorded at 10,000 people. Two other men who were convicted of the same crime - robbery and murder - died in their jail cell. (1)

The country's first known serial killers, Big Harpe and Little Harpe, murdered a twelve-year-old Green County boy in 1799. (1)

(1) "History of Green County, Kentucky," by Lanny Tucker.

The Cow Days Festival is held in Greensburg the 3rd weekend of September. The event originated during the late 1930s, when Greensburg merchants would give away a cow to entice people to come to town.

== Geography ==
According to the U.S. Census Bureau, the county has a total area of 289 square miles (750 km^{2}), of which 286 square miles (740 km^{2}) is land and 2.8 square miles (7.3 km^{2}) (1.0%) is water.

Green County is in the central time zone.

=== Adjacent counties ===
- LaRue County (north/Eastern Time Border)
- Taylor County (northeast/Eastern Time Border)
- Adair County (southeast)
- Metcalfe County (southwest)
- Hart County (west)

== Demographics ==
Historical population
Census	Pop.	Note	%±
1800	6,096		—
1810	6,735		10.5%
1820	11,943		77.3%
1830	13,138		10.0%
1840	14,212		8.2%
1850	9,060		−36.3%
1860	8,806		−2.8%
1870	9,379		6.5%
1880	11,871		26.6%
1890	11,463		−3.4%
1900	12,255		6.9%
1910	11,871		−3.1%
1920	11,391		−4.0%
1930	11,401		0.1%
1940	12,321		8.1%
1950	11,261		−8.6%
1960	11,249		−0.1%
1970	10,350		−8.0%
1980	11,043		6.7%
1990	10,371		−6.1%
2000	11,518		11.1%
2010	11,258		−2.3%
2020	11,107		−1.3%
2025 (est.)	11,644	▲	4.8%
U.S. Decennial Census; 1790-1960 1900-1990; 1990-2000 2010-2021

=== 2020 census ===
As of the 2020 census, the county had a population of 11,107. The median age was 44.6 years. 22.2% of residents were under the age of 18 and 21.1% of residents were 65 years of age or older. For every 100 females there were 94.5 males, and for every 100 females age 18 and over there were 93.7 males age 18 and over.

The racial makeup of the county was 94.1% White, 1.4% Black or African American, 0.2% American Indian and Alaska Native, 0.3% Asian, 0.0% Native Hawaiian and Pacific Islander, 0.9% from some other race, and 3.2% from two or more races. Hispanic or Latino residents of any race comprised 1.8% of the population.

0.0% of residents lived in urban areas, while 100.0% lived in rural areas.

There were 4,606 households in the county, of which 28.5% had children under the age of 18 living with them and 24.8% had a female householder with no spouse or partner present. About 28.3% of all households were made up of individuals and 13.7% had someone living alone who was 65 years of age or older.

There were 5,270 housing units, of which 12.6% were vacant. Among occupied housing units, 74.4% were owner-occupied and 25.6% were renter-occupied. The homeowner vacancy rate was 1.0% and the rental vacancy rate was 4.7%.

=== 2000 census ===
As of the census of 2000, there were 11,518 people, 4,706 households, and 3,378 families residing in the county. The population density was 40 per square mile (15/km^{2}). There were 5,420 housing units at an average density of 19 per square mile (7.3/km^{2}). The racial makeup of the county was 96.19% White, 2.61% Black or African American, 0.10% Native American, 0.13% Asian, 0.31% from other races, and 0.65% from two or more races. 0.95% of the population were Hispanic or Latino of any race.

There were 4,706 households, out of which 29.90% had children under the age of 18 living with them, 59.70% were married couples living together, 8.50% had a female householder with no husband present, and 28.20% were non-families. 25.40% of all households were made up of individuals, and 13.20% had someone living alone who was 65 years of age or older. The average household size was 2.41 and the average family size was 2.87.

In the county, the population was spread out, with 22.70% under the age of 18, 8.10% from 18 to 24, 26.80% from 25 to 44, 25.40% from 45 to 64, and 16.90% who were 65 years of age or older. The median age was 40 years. For every 100 females there were 96.90 males. For every 100 females age 18 and over, there were 91.90 males.

The median income for a household in the county was $25,463, and the median income for a family was $31,852. Males had a median income of $25,764 versus $17,510 for females. The per capita income for the county was $16,107. About 15.20% of families and 18.40% of the population were below the poverty line, including 23.10% of those under age 18 and 18.50% of those age 65 or over.

== Communities ==
=== City ===
- Greensburg (county seat)

=== Census-designated place ===
- Summersville

=== Other unincorporated places ===
- Black Gnat (partly in Taylor County in the Eastern Time Zone)
- Bluff Boom
- Eve
- Exie
- Grab
- Hashingsville
- Little Barren
- Lobb
- Mell
- Newt
- Pierce
- Roachville
- Webbs
- Hudgins

== Notable people ==
- Junius George Groves, born a slave in Green County, he moved to Kansas in the 1870s and became known as the "Kansas Potato King," one year producing 72,150 bushels of potatoes on 295 acres. At his death, Groves owned a 22-room brick house.
- Herman W. Rattliff, member of the Kentucky House of Representatives
- Henry Skaggs (January 8, 1724 – December 4, 1810), an American longhunter, explorer and pioneer

== Politics ==
United States presidential election results for Green County, Kentucky
Year	Republican		Democratic		Third party(ies)	
Year	No.	%	No.	%	No.	%
1912	687	27.67%	1,117	44.99%	679	27.35%
1916	1,412	52.88%	1,239	46.40%	19	0.71%
1920	2,310	57.04%	1,723	42.54%	17	0.42%
1924	1,920	55.16%	1,548	44.47%	13	0.37%
1928	2,824	68.84%	1,272	31.01%	6	0.15%
1932	2,281	49.77%	2,277	49.68%	25	0.55%
1936	2,336	54.17%	1,970	45.69%	6	0.14%
1940	2,497	55.39%	1,993	44.21%	18	0.40%
1944	2,379	56.39%	1,809	42.88%	31	0.73%
1948	2,186	55.97%	1,628	41.68%	92	2.36%
1952	2,773	59.75%	1,857	40.01%	11	0.24%
1956	2,951	62.93%	1,726	36.81%	12	0.26%
1960	3,606	69.53%	1,580	30.47%	0	0.00%
1964	2,110	49.23%	2,160	50.40%	16	0.37%
1968	2,448	58.71%	1,003	24.05%	719	17.24%
1972	2,755	68.82%	1,209	30.20%	39	0.97%
1976	2,397	53.04%	2,085	46.14%	37	0.82%
1980	2,775	60.50%	1,758	38.33%	54	1.18%
1984	3,210	66.35%	1,611	33.30%	17	0.35%
1988	3,139	66.07%	1,595	33.57%	17	0.36%
1992	2,709	54.33%	1,760	35.30%	517	10.37%
1996	2,763	60.86%	1,285	28.30%	492	10.84%
2000	3,615	76.01%	1,085	22.81%	56	1.18%
2004	3,866	74.26%	1,312	25.20%	28	0.54%
2008	3,785	74.52%	1,204	23.71%	90	1.77%
2012	3,634	74.84%	1,165	23.99%	57	1.17%
2016	4,372	81.98%	832	15.60%	129	2.42%
2020	4,838	83.24%	920	15.83%	54	0.93%
2024	5,033	85.93%	782	13.35%	42	0.72%

=== Elected officials ===
Elected officials as of January 3, 2025
U.S. House	Brett Guthrie (R)	KY 2
Ky. Senate	David P. Givens (R)	9
Ky. House	Ryan Bivens (R)	24

== See also ==
- Green County High School
- Dry counties
- National Register of Historic Places listings in Green County, Kentucky
