= Greensburg, Kentucky =

- City
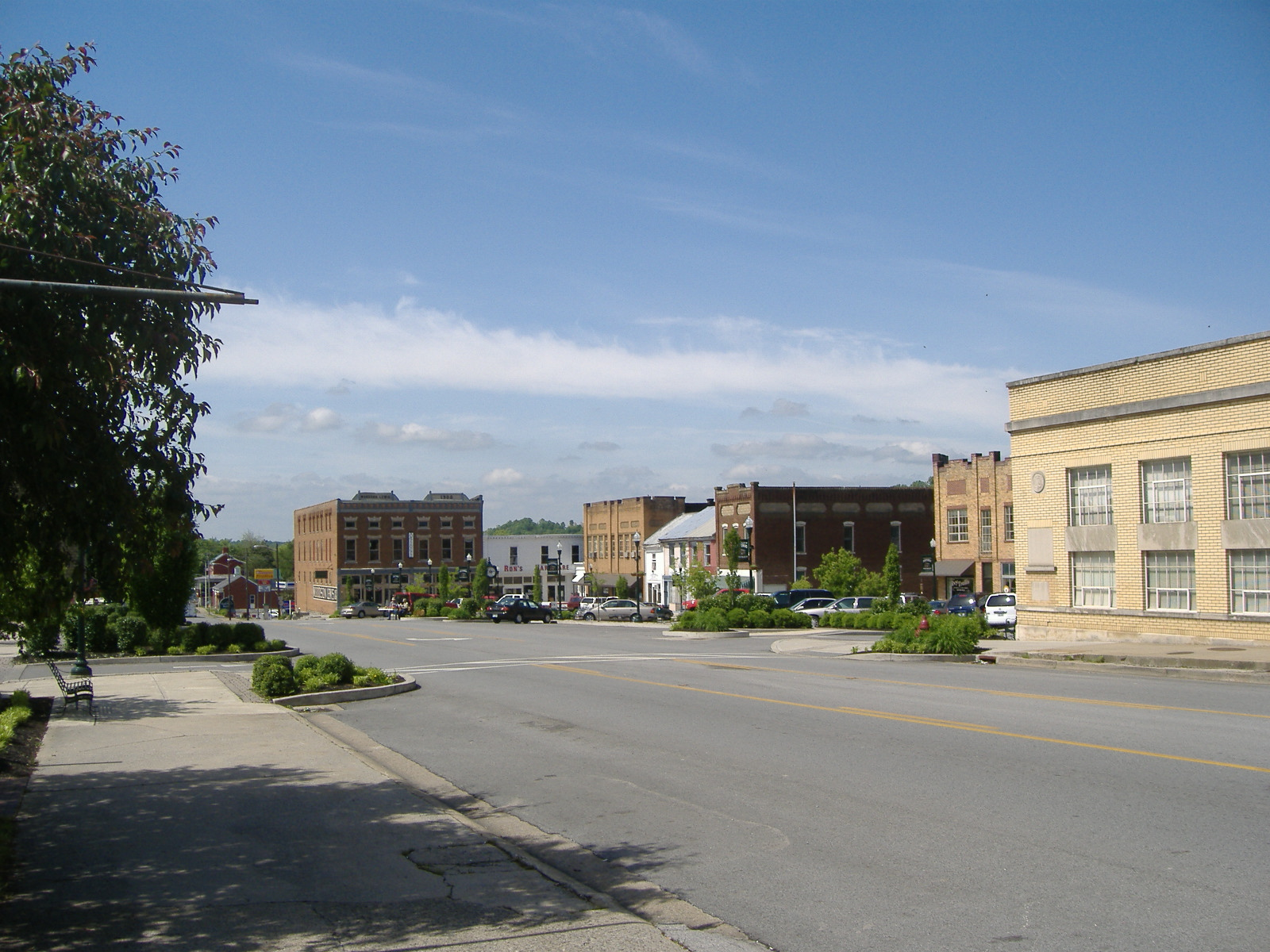
- Downtown Greensburg

- Seal

- Location of Greensburg in Green County, Kentucky.
- Coordinates: 37°15′35″N 85°29′52″W
- Country: United States
- State: Kentucky
- County: Green
- Established: 1794
- Incorporated: 1795
- Named after: its county

Government
  - Mayor: John Shuffett

Area
  - Total: 2.04 sq mi (5.29 km^{2})
  - Land: 2.03 sq mi (5.27 km^{2})
  - Water: 0.0077 sq mi (0.02 km^{2})
- Elevation: 600 ft (183 m)

Population (2020)
  - Total: 2,179
  - Estimate (2022): 2,208
  - Density: 1,071.6/sq mi (413.73/km^{2})
- Time zone: UTC-6 (Central (CST))
  - Summer (DST): UTC-5 (CDT)
- ZIP code: 42743
- Area codes: 270 & 364
- FIPS code: 21-32968
- GNIS feature ID: 0493339
- Website: www.greensburgonline.com

Greensburg is a home rule-class city in and the county seat of Green County, Kentucky, United States. As of the 2020 census, Greensburg had a population of 2,179.

The Downtown Greensburg Historic District is on the National Register of Historic Places and includes the oldest courthouse west of the Allegheny Mountains.

== Geography ==
Greensburg is located east of the center of Green County at 37°15′35″N 85°29′52″W (37.259665, -85.497863), on the north side of the Green River, a west-flowing tributary of the Ohio River. U.S. Route 68 passes through the city as Main Street; it leads northeast 11 miles (18 km) to Campbellsville and southwest 25 miles (40 km) to Edmonton. Kentucky Route 61 joins US 68 on Main Street through Greensburg; KY 61 leads northwest 40 miles (64 km) to Elizabethtown and southeast 19 miles (31 km) to Columbia.

According to the United States Census Bureau, Greensburg has a total area of 2.1 square miles (5.4 km^{2}), of which 0.01 square miles (0.03 km^{2}), or 0.59%, is water.

=== Climate ===
The climate in this area is characterized by hot, humid summers and generally mild to cool winters. According to the Köppen Climate Classification system, Greensburg has a humid subtropical climate, abbreviated "Cfa" on climate maps.

The highest recorded temperature at Greensburg was 114 °F (46 °C) on July 28, 1930, the highest temperature ever recorded in Kentucky.

Climate data for Greensburg, Kentucky, 1991–2020 normals, extremes 1896–2016
Month	Jan	Feb	Mar	Apr	May	Jun	Jul	Aug	Sep	Oct	Nov	Dec	Year
Record high °F (°C)	82 (28)	81 (27)	89 (32)	97 (36)	99 (37)	107 (42)	114 (46)	110 (43)	108 (42)	98 (37)	84 (29)	78 (26)	114 (46)
Mean maximum °F (°C)	66.7 (19.3)	71.3 (21.8)	79.0 (26.1)	85.7 (29.8)	88.2 (31.2)	94.1 (34.5)	96.6 (35.9)	96.5 (35.8)	92.8 (33.8)	85.3 (29.6)	77.8 (25.4)	67.6 (19.8)	98.2 (36.8)
Mean daily maximum °F (°C)	44.7 (7.1)	49.4 (9.7)	58.6 (14.8)	69.5 (20.8)	77.8 (25.4)	85.4 (29.7)	88.4 (31.3)	88.2 (31.2)	82.4 (28.0)	71.3 (21.8)	58.6 (14.8)	58.3 (14.6)	69.4 (20.8)
Daily mean °F (°C)	35.1 (1.7)	38.6 (3.7)	46.5 (8.1)	56.3 (13.5)	65.7 (18.7)	74.0 (23.3)	77.6 (25.3)	76.4 (24.7)	69.6 (20.9)	57.8 (14.3)	46.4 (8.0)	38.6 (3.7)	56.9 (13.8)
Mean daily minimum °F (°C)	25.5 (−3.6)	27.8 (−2.3)	34.4 (1.3)	43.1 (6.2)	53.6 (12.0)	62.6 (17.0)	66.7 (19.3)	64.5 (18.1)	56.8 (13.8)	44.3 (6.8)	34.3 (1.3)	29.0 (−1.7)	45.2 (7.3)
Mean minimum °F (°C)	4.0 (−15.6)	9.3 (−12.6)	18.6 (−7.4)	26.7 (−2.9)	38.1 (3.4)	49.4 (9.7)	55.5 (13.1)	54.1 (12.3)	41.3 (5.2)	29.6 (−1.3)	20.8 (−6.2)	9.4 (−12.6)	−0.1 (−17.8)
Record low °F (°C)	−25 (−32)	−29 (−34)	−4 (−20)	13 (−11)	27 (−3)	37 (3)	39 (4)	42 (6)	25 (−4)	17 (−8)	−3 (−19)	−19 (−28)	−29 (−34)
Average precipitation inches (mm)	3.87 (98)	4.23 (107)	4.76 (121)	4.84 (123)	5.05 (128)	4.74 (120)	4.92 (125)	3.22 (82)	4.00 (102)	3.73 (95)	3.68 (93)	4.68 (119)	51.72 (1,313)
Average precipitation days (≥ 0.01 in)	9.7	9.0	10.7	10.7	10.1	10.7	9.6	7.1	7.3	7.7	8.6	10.6	111.8
Source 1: NOAA
Source 2: National Weather Service (mean maxima/minima 1981–2010)

== History ==
The 1780 settlement was originally known as "Glover's Station", for local landowner John Glover, who received 193 acres (0.78 km^{2}) in the area as a military grant after the American Revolution.

Following the establishment of Green County (named for Revolutionary War Maj. General Nathanael Greene) from parts of Lincoln and Nelson counties in 1792, Greensburg was laid out and established two years later as its eponymous seat of government. It was incorporated as a city a year after that. The central Public Square was also laid out in 1795 and has been retained as designed since then, with the only changes being the paving of the square with concrete and the installation of concrete dividers in the four quadrants.

The first post office arrived in 1807 and was variously known as "Greensburg" and "Greensburg Court House" during the early 19th century.

The first courthouse in Greensburg was established in 1803.

The first bank, Greensburg Independent Bank, was established in 1818.

The first known school in Greensburg, called Greenburg Academy, was open from 1815 to 1818.

== Demographics ==
Historical population
Census	Pop.	Note	%±
1800	70		—
1810	132		88.6%
1830	669		—
1840	585		−12.6%
1860	536		—
1870	351		−34.5%
1880	620		76.6%
1890	552		−11.0%
1900	564		2.2%
1910	450		−20.2%
1920	488		8.4%
1930	770		57.8%
1940	1,176		52.7%
1950	1,032		−12.2%
1960	2,334		126.2%
1970	1,990		−14.7%
1980	2,377		19.4%
1990	1,990		−16.3%
2000	2,396		20.4%
2010	2,163		−9.7%
2020	2,179		0.7%
2022 (est.)	2,208		1.3%
U.S. Decennial Census

=== 2020 census ===
As of the 2020 census, Greensburg had a population of 2,179. The median age was 42.8 years. 23.2% of residents were under the age of 18 and 24.4% of residents were 65 years of age or older. For every 100 females there were 81.3 males, and for every 100 females age 18 and over there were 78.8 males age 18 and over.

0.0% of residents lived in urban areas, while 100.0% lived in rural areas.

There were 931 households in Greensburg, of which 29.0% had children under the age of 18 living in them. Of all households, 36.0% were married-couple households, 18.0% were households with a male householder and no spouse or partner present, and 38.8% were households with a female householder and no spouse or partner present. About 37.2% of all households were made up of individuals and 16.8% had someone living alone who was 65 years of age or older.

There were 1,058 housing units, of which 12.0% were vacant. The homeowner vacancy rate was 2.1% and the rental vacancy rate was 6.3%.

Racial composition as of the 2020 census
Race	Number	Percent
White	1,998	91.7%
Black or African American	59	2.7%
American Indian and Alaska Native	3	0.1%
Asian	8	0.4%
Native Hawaiian and Other Pacific Islander	1	0.0%
Some other race	5	0.2%
Two or more races	105	4.8%
Hispanic or Latino (of any race)	49	2.2%

=== 2000 census ===
As of the census of 2000, there were 2,396 people, 1,061 households, and 648 families residing in the city. The population density was 1,255.4 inhabitants per square mile (484.7/km^{2}). There were 1,190 housing units at an average density of 623.5 per square mile (240.7/km^{2}). The racial makeup of the city was 92.99% White, 4.63% African American, 0.08% Native American, 0.38% Asian, 0.50% from other races, and 1.42% from two or more races. Hispanic or Latino of any race were 0.96% of the population.

There were 1,061 households, out of which 24.8% had children under the age of 18 living with them, 43.6% were married couples living together, 14.1% had a female householder with no husband present, and 38.9% were non-families. 37.1% of all households were made up of individuals, and 21.3% had someone living alone who was 65 years of age or older. The average household size was 2.12 and the average family size was 2.75.

In the city, the population was spread out, with 21.5% under the age of 18, 7.7% from 18 to 24, 22.1% from 25 to 44, 23.4% from 45 to 64, and 25.3% who were 65 years of age or older. The median age was 44 years. For every 100 females, there were 78.5 males. For every 100 females age 18 and over, there were 71.5 males.

The median income for a household in the city was $20,556, and the median income for a family was $29,818. Males had a median income of $26,065 versus $18,031 for females. The per capita income for the city was $14,296. About 21.3% of families and 24.8% of the population were below the poverty line, including 34.8% of those under age 18 and 13.5% of those age 65 or over.

== Education ==
Greensburg has a lending library, the Green County Public Library.

The public school system, Green County Public Schools, consists of 4 different schools including Green County High School. As of 2021, the school system consists of 1,648 students.

== Events ==
Greensburg holds an annual festival called Cow Days

== Notable people ==
- John Richard Barret, U.S. congressman from Missouri
- Aylette Buckner, U.S. congressman from Kentucky
- George Washington Buckner, physician and diplomat; United States minister to Liberia from 1913 to 1915
- Richard Aylett Buckner, U.S. congressman from Kentucky and father of Aylette Buckner
- Mentor Graham, teacher best known for tutoring Abraham Lincoln
- Aaron Harding, U.S. congressman from Kentucky
- Rod Henderson, former Major League Baseball pitcher
- William Herndon, friend and biographer of Abraham Lincoln
- Edward H. Hobson, Union Army general during the Civil War
- Blake Judd, independent filmmaker
- John W. Lewis, U.S. congressman from Kentucky
- Dakota Meyer, U.S. Marine and Medal of Honor recipient
- William Thomas Ward, Union general during the Civil War and U.S. congressman
