= National Register of Historic Places listings in Jackson County, Kentucky =

Location of Jackson County in Kentucky

This is a list of the National Register of Historic Places listings in Jackson County, Kentucky.

It is intended to be a complete list of the properties on the National Register of Historic Places in Jackson County, Kentucky, United States. The locations of National Register properties for which the latitude and longitude coordinates are included below, may be seen in a map.

There are 5 properties listed on the National Register in the county.

This National Park Service list is complete through NPS recent listings posted February 20, 2026.

== Current listings ==
| | Name on the Register | Image | Date listed | Location | City or town | Description |
|---|---|---|---|---|---|---|
| 1 | Annville Institute | Annville Institute | February 28, 2012 (#12000043) | 190 Campus Dr. 37°19′12″N 83°58′22″W | Annville | |
| 2 | Brushy Ridge Petroglyphs | | January 2, 1992 (#91001890) | Address Restricted | McKee | |
| 3 | Daugherty Bear Track Petroglyphs (15JA160) | | September 8, 1989 (#89001192) | Address Restricted | McKee | |
| 4 | William Gay Petroglyph | | January 2, 1992 (#91001889) | Address Restricted | Macedonia | |
| 5 | Arthur Lakes Log House | | October 23, 2000 (#00000867) | 401 Lakes Creek Rd. 37°29′23″N 83°57′34″W | McKee | |

== See also ==
- List of National Historic Landmarks in Kentucky
- National Register of Historic Places listings in Kentucky
