= Kentucky Route 30 =

State highway in Kentucky, United States

Kentucky Route 30
- KY 30 highlighted in red

Route information
- Maintained by KYTC
- Length: 102.023 mi (164.190 km)

Major junctions
- West end: Hal Rogers Parkway / KY 354 in London
- US 421 near Tyner; KY 11 near Booneville; KY 52 in Jackson; KY 15 in Jackson; Mountain Parkway near Salyersville
- East end: US 460 near Slayeraville

Location
- Country: United States
- State: Kentucky
- Counties: Laurel, Jackson, Owsley, Breathitt, Magoffin

Highway system
- Kentucky State Highway System; Interstate; US; State; Parkways
← KY 29	→ US 31

Kentucky Route 30 (KY 30) is an east–west state highway in Kentucky, United States. It is managed by the Kentucky Transportation Cabinet.

It goes through Laurel, Jackson, Owsley, Breathitt, Magoffin Counties.

== Route description ==
KY 30 begins at an intersection with the Hal Rogers Parkway in London, and goes north as a divided highway until it becomes an undivided two-lane highway about a mile up the road. The road is a recently constructed standard highway with 11 ft wide lanes and shoulders on both sides of the road, with a speed limit of 55 mph. The road continues through Greenmount into Jackson County. The road then goes through the hilly terrain of Jackson County, and runs past Annville and reaches US 421 at Tyner. At this point, the road is no longer a standard highway and runs as a concurrency to the northern part of Tyner, where it goes east towards Mummie. The road runs a very curvy route and reaches Owsley County where it continues to be curvy until it reaches another newly constructed standard highway at Travellers Rest, which continues past Vincent into Levi where the road intersects with KY 11. From here, the road follows a concurrent route with KY 11 into Booneville and heads west towards Breathitt County. From here, the road curves and goes into the town of Jackson where it then goes on another curvy route into Magoffin County where it meets its eastern terminus in Salyersville.

== New alignment ==
Work has been done to improve the route of KY 30, to establish it as a corridor between London and the impoverished areas the road currently runs through. Beginning in 2003, KY 30 has been realigned on a ~7 mile segment between London and Greenmount, where construction stalled until 2010 when a ~15 mile segment was completed between Greenmount and Annville, where construction stalled again. In 2014, a ~5 mile segment was completed between Annville and Tyner. In a separate segment, a new ~7 mile alignment was constructed in Owsley County between Levi and Travellers Rest. It is estimated that the road will be completely connected as a new highway between Laurel, Jackson and Owsley Counties by 2022. Another development for the corridor may be under way for KY 11 between Levi and Beattyville to connect the realigned segment to another standard highway, to connect Lee, Powell, and Wolfe Counties to this new corridor that leads to London in Laurel County.

== Major intersections ==
County	Location	mi	km	Destinations	Notes
Laurel	London	0.000	0.000	Hal Rogers Parkway / KY 354 south (Tobacco Road) to I-75	
Laurel		2.785	4.482	KY 1227	
Laurel		3.567	5.741	KY 3094 west (Greenmount Bond Road) – East Bernstadt	Eastern terminus of KY 3094
Laurel		5.646	9.086	KY 1394 west	Eastern terminus of KY 1394
Laurel		8.155	13.124	KY 578 east (McWhorter-Victory Road)	West end of KY 578 overlap
Laurel		8.246	13.271	KY 578 west	East end of KY 578 overlap
Jackson	Moores Creek	11.663	18.770	KY 577	
Jackson		14.153	22.777	KY 578 (Green Hill Road) – Annville	
Jackson	Annville	15.013	24.161	KY 3444 (Medical Drive)	
Jackson		15.715	25.291	KY 3629 north to KY 3630 – Annville	Southern terminus of KY 3629
Jackson		16.097	25.906	KY 3443 west (Welchburg Road) to KY 3630 – Annville	West end of KY 3443 overlap
Jackson		16.192	26.058	KY 3443 east (Welchburg Road)	East end of KY 3443 overlap
Jackson		18.687	30.074	US 421 south – Manchester	West end of US 421 concurrency
Jackson		18.839	30.318	KY 1431 east	Western terminus of KY 1431
Jackson	Tyner	18.972	30.532	KY 3630 west – Annville	Eastern terminus of KY 3630; former routing of KY 30
Jackson		19.786	31.842	US 421 north – McKee	East end of US 421 concurrency
Jackson		22.047	35.481	KY 1431 west	Eastern terminus of KY 1431
Owsley		28.389	45.688	KY 1071 west (Pierson Fork Road)	West end of KY 1071 overlap
Owsley		28.768	46.298	KY 1071 east	East end of KY 1071 overlap
Owsley		31.560	50.791	KY 846 east	Western terminus of KY 846
Owsley		33.348	53.668	KY 847 north	Southern terminus of KY 847
Owsley	Vincent	34.931	56.216	KY 399 north	Southern terminus of KY 399
Owsley	Travellers Rest	38.962	62.703	KY 847 south	Northern terminus of KY 847
Owsley		39.303	63.252	KY 11 north	West end of KY 11 concurrency
Owsley		39.892	64.200	KY 3504 east	Western terminus of KY 3504
Owsley	Booneville	41.532	66.839	KY 11 south – Manchester	East end of KY 11 concurrency
Owsley	Booneville	41.563	66.889	KY 28 east (South Court Street) – Buckhorn, Chavies, Grapevine, Hazard	Western terminus of KY 28
Owsley		42.610	68.574	KY 3347 south (Shepherds Lane Road) – Owsley County High School	Northern terminus of KY 3347
Owsley		42.931	69.091	KY 3346 north	Southern terminus of KY 3346
Owsley		43.204	69.530	KY 1411 north	Southern terminus of KY 1411
Owsley	Lerose	45.303	72.908	KY 708 north – Lone, Tallega	Southern terminus of KY 708
Owsley		45.901	73.870	KY 2024 south	Northern terminus of KY 2024
Breathitt		51.460	82.817	KY 1202 north	Southern terminus of KY 1202
Breathitt		53.429	85.986	KY 1114 south	Northern terminus of KY 1114
Breathitt		54.811	88.210	KY 315 south – Buckhorn Lake State Resort Park	Northern terminus of KY 315
Breathitt		54.979	88.480	KY 3237 east – Canoe	Western terminus of KY 3237
Breathitt	Shoulderblade	55.930	90.011	KY 2469 north – Highland, Athol	Southern terminus of KY 2469
Breathitt		60.138	96.783	KY 397 south	Northern terminus of KY 397
Breathitt		62.705	100.914	Town Hill Road	Former KY 3504 east
Breathitt	Jackson	63.271	101.825	KY 52 west – Beattyville	Eastern terminus of KY 52
Breathitt	Jackson	64.804	104.292	KY 205 north – Campton	Southern terminus of KY 205
Breathitt	Jackson	65.383	105.224	KY 15 to Mountain Parkway – Campton	West end of KY 15 concurrency
Breathitt	Jackson	65.834	105.950	KY 1812 south (Washington Avenue) – Quicksand	West end of KY 1812 overlap
Breathitt	Jackson	66.310	106.716	Jett Drive (KY 3232 north)	Lakeside Medical Center at the north end of the road
Breathitt	Jackson	66.530	107.070	KY 1812 north / KY 3068 west (Main Street)	East end of KY 1812 overlap; western terminus of KY 3068
Breathitt		68.382	110.050	KY 15 south – Hazard	East end of KY 15 concurrency
Breathitt		72.672	116.954	KY 2436 north – Julian Carroll Airport	Southern terminus of KY 2436
Breathitt		79.172	127.415	KY 2466 north	Southern terminus of KY 2466
Breathitt		86.871	139.805	KY 542 east	Western terminus of KY 542
Magoffin		94.360	151.858	KY 1397 south	Northern terminus of KY 1397
Magoffin		96.611	155.480	KY 1090 north	Southern terminus of KY 1090
Magoffin		97.778	157.358	KY 378 west	Eastern terminus of KY 378
Magoffin		98.942	159.232	KY 3337 west	Eastern terminus of KY 3337
Magoffin		100.068– 100.249	161.044– 161.335	Mountain Parkway – Salyersville, Prestonsburg, Lexington	Mountain Parkway exit 72
Magoffin		102.023	164.190	US 460 / KY 7 – West Liberty, Salyersville	
1.000 mi = 1.609 km; 1.000 km = 0.621 mi: Concurrency terminus
