= Hal Rogers Parkway =

Highway in Kentucky, U.S.

Hal Rogers Parkway
- Hal Rogers Parkway highlighted in red

Route information
- Maintained by KYTC
- Length: 91.135 mi (146.668 km)

Major junctions
- West end: US 27 / KY 80 in Somerset
- I-75 in London; US 25 / KY 80 in London
- East end: KY 15 / KY 80 near Hazard

Location
- Country: United States
- State: Kentucky
- Counties: Pulaski, Laurel, Clay, Leslie, Perry

Highway system
- Kentucky State Highway System; Interstate; US; State; Parkways

The Hal Rogers Parkway, formerly named the Daniel Boone Parkway, is a freeway connecting Somerset and Hazard in southeastern Kentucky. A former toll road, it opened in November 1971, and the tolls were removed June 1, 2003. The original extent of the highway was to be 65.70 miles (105.73 km) with that mileage to have been included with an unconstructed limited-access London bypass and what is east of this area. The original portion of the road is designated unsigned Kentucky Route 9006 (HR 9006). An extension of the Hal Rogers Parkway name west along Kentucky Route 80 (KY 80) to U.S. Route 27 (US 27) in Somerset was made in 2015 bringing the total mileage to 91.135 miles (146.668 km).

== Route description ==
Per the Kentucky Transportation Cabinet (KYTC), the Hal Rogers Parkway begins in Somerset, Pulaski County, at the intersection of US 27 and KY 80 north of downtown area. The highway heads east as a four-lane divided highway with a concrete median and turning lanes provided at the at-grade intersections through the northern neighborhoods of the city. Passing the eastern terminus of KY 914, the median becomes grass and eventually exits the city limits of Somerset for a more rural area of Pulaski County. After its interchange with KY 461 near Shopville, the parkway narrows to an undivided highway with two lanes and occasional turning and passing lanes provided. As it enters the Daniel Boone National Forest, the highway winds its way around small mountain valleys. Crossing the Rockcastle River into Laurel County, the highway heads a straighter course through the small mountains. Before exiting the national forest, the highway widens to a four-lane divided highway again with the number of commercial businesses located around the highway increasing as it heads east. After entering the city of London, the Parkway passes many intersections for minor state highways before interchanging with Interstate 75 (I-75) at its exit 41 around many traveler-related businesses. After the interchange, a center turn lane is provided along the highway to serve additional businesses and side streets.

Upon reaching its intersection with US 25, KY 80 exits the Parkway while the Parkway alone (unsigned HR 9006) continues east as a four-lane undivided highway with a center turn lane. East of KY 30/KY 354 and the North Laurel High School, the parkway narrows to two lanes and features a few more at-grade intersections near downtown London. Past KY 192, the Parkway becomes a two-lane expressway featuring a mix of at-grade intersections, overpasses without access, and interchanges. In Hazard, the Parkway intersects three local streets at-grade before terminating at an interchange with KY 15 and KY 80.

== History ==
The Hal Rogers Parkway previously used a brown shield.

=== As a toll road ===
The then-Daniel Boone Parkway, as with all eight of the other parkways, was originally a toll road from its 1971 opening until 2003.

By Kentucky state law, toll collection ceases when enough toll has been collected or funds received from other sources, such as a legislative appropriation, to pay off the construction bonds for the parkway. The toll booths were dismantled soon after the tolls were removed on June 1, 2003, and new Hal Rogers Parkway signs replaced the Daniel Boone Parkway signs sometime later in the same year. The two at-grade toll booths at exits 34 and 44 were converted into regular intersections and the mainline toll booth near London was dismantled. It is the only parkway in the state of Kentucky to be almost exclusively two-lanes with the occasional truck lanes on the hills. There is a center paint divider with rumble strips added as a safety feature. The only at-grade intersections are located at exit 34 and 44 in Clay and Leslie counties, respectively, along with the stretch of parkway from the western terminus at US 25 to KY 192, totaling 4 miles (6.4 km) in Laurel County, and from milepost 58 to exit 59 in Perry County near Hazard.

U.S. Representative Hal Rogers was the forerunner in getting the tolls lifted on the Daniel Boone Parkway, securing $13 million in federal funding. Former governor Paul E. Patton, to thank him for removing the tolls on the highway, renamed the Daniel Boone Parkway the Hal Rogers Parkway. This stirred a lot of controversy among Kentucky residents and descendants of Daniel Boone who were offended that a parkway originally named for the famous pioneer, who helped settle Kentucky, was renamed for a sitting congressman whose main accomplishment was getting the tolls lifted off of the parkway. Soon after, the Associated Press picked up the controversy regarding the renaming of the parkway and outrage over the renaming has been heard across the United States and as far as the United Kingdom. On October 14, 2015, at a surprise ceremony attended by Rogers, Governor Steve Beshear and KYTC officials renamed a 32-mile (51 km) stretch of KY 80 between Somerset and London as an extension of the Hal Rogers Parkway. Somerset was the residence of Rogers at the time of the renaming. The road had been named the Russell Dyche Memorial Highway for a London newspaperman and politician.

== Future ==
A connection between the Cumberland Expressway and the Hal Rogers Parkway, dubbed the Somerset Northern Bypass, is planned for the future. On March 9, 2024, a $45 million Community Project Funding earmark was secured in the federal Consolidated Appropriations Act of 2024. A timeline for this extension has not yet been established.

== Major intersections ==
County	Location	mi	km	Exit	Destinations	Notes
Pulaski	Somerset	0.000	0.000		US 27 / KY 80 west to Cumberland Expressway – Stanford, Bowling Green	Western end of KY 80 concurrency
Pulaski	Somerset	0.124	0.200		KY 2300 south (Clifty Street)	Northern terminus of KY 2300
Pulaski	Somerset	0.754	1.213		KY 1247 (North Main Street) – Somerset Business District	
Pulaski	Somerset	1.087	1.749		KY 39 (Crab Orchard Street) – Somerset High School, Pulaski County High School, Crab Orchard, Somerset	
Pulaski	Somerset	1.862	2.997		KY 3260 north (Pumphouse Road)	Southern terminus of KY 3260
Pulaski	Somerset	2.315	3.726		KY 80 Bus. west to KY 192	Eastern terminus of KY 80 Bus.
Pulaski	Somerset	2.751	4.427		KY 914 west (Southeastern Bypass) / Garner School Road	Eastern terminus of KY 914; to Lake Cumberland Regional Airport
Pulaski	Somerset	4.795	7.717		KY 3260 south (Pumphouse Road)	Northern terminus of KY 3260
Pulaski	Barnesburg	6.640	10.686		KY 1317 north	Southern terminus of KY 1317
Pulaski	Shopville	8.773	14.119		KY 461 north / Old Shopville Road – Mt. Vernon	Interchange; southern terminus of KY 461
Pulaski	Shopville	9.388	15.109		KY 692 south (Grundy Road)	Northern terminus of KY 692
Pulaski	Shopville	10.494	16.888		KY 1003 south / Shopville Road Conn. West	Northern terminus of KY 1003
Pulaski	Stab	12.526	20.159		KY 1675 south / Rocky Tree Road	Northern terminus of KY 1675
Pulaski	Squib	18.841	30.322		KY 1956 east (Old London Road) / Squib-Ano Road	Western terminus of KY 1956
Laurel		28.352	45.628		KY 1535 (Sinking Creek Road)	
Laurel		29.700	47.798		KY 1035 (Pine Top Road)	
Laurel	London	30.811	49.585		KY 1956 west (Somerset Road) / Carrera Drive	Eastern terminus of KY 1956
Laurel	London	31.096	50.044		KY 3534 east (Jerrys Road) / Shiloh Drive	Western terminus of KY 3534
Laurel	London	31.306	50.382		KY 3534 west (Jerrys Road) / Faith Assembly Church Road	Eastern terminus of KY 3534
Laurel	London	31.442– 31.584	50.601– 50.830		I-75 – Knoxville, Lexington	Exit 41 (I-75)
Laurel	London	31.801	51.179		KY 3006 south (New Frontage Road) / Gop Street	Northern terminus of KY 3006; to CHI St. Joseph Health - London
Laurel	London	32.047	51.575		US 25 / KY 80 east (North Main Street) – Levi Jackson State Park, London	Eastern end of KY 80 concurrency, western terminus of HR 9006; to CHI St. Joseph Health - London
Laurel	London	32.813	52.807		KY 1769 south (Moren Road)	Northern terminus of KY 1769
Laurel	London	33.136	53.327		KY 30 north / KY 354 south (Tobacco Road) – Annville, Tyner, McKee	Southern terminus of KY 30; northern terminus of KY 354
Laurel	London	34.297	55.196		KY 638 (McWhorter Street)	
Laurel	London	35.057	56.419		KY 472 (Johnson Road)	
Laurel	London	35.924	57.814		KY 192 west to I-75 south / Rebecca Lane – Levi Jackson State Park	Eastern terminus of KY 192
Clay	Manchester	53.565	86.205	20	KY 80 to US 421 – Manchester	Interchange
Clay	Hector Creek	59.501	95.758		KY 873 (Elk Mountain Road) to KY 149	
Clay	Big Creek	65.851	105.977		To KY 66	Former exit 34; access via unsigned KY 66C
Leslie	Thousandsticks	76.235	122.688		KY 118 south – Hyden	Former exit 44; northern terminus of KY 118; to Mary Breckinridge ARH Hospital
Perry		87.303	140.501	55	KY 451 / Briar Fork Circle Road	Proposed interchange
Perry		88.503	142.432	56	KY 451	Interchange
Perry	Hazard	91.135	146.668	59	KY 15 / KY 80 – Hazard, Jackson, Prestonsburg, Pikeville	Interchange; eastern terminus of HR 9006
1.000 mi = 1.609 km; 1.000 km = 0.621 mi: Concurrency terminus; Unopened
