= Bradshaw, Kentucky =

Unincorporated community in Kentucky, United States

- Unincorporated community
- Location within Kentucky Location within the United States
- Coordinates: 37°25′17″N 83°56′52″W
- Country: United States
- State: Kentucky
- County: Jackson
- Elevation: 1,276 ft (389 m)
- Time zone: UTC-5 (Eastern (EST))
  - Summer (DST): UTC-4 (EST)
- ZIP codes: 40447
- Area code: 606
- GNIS feature ID

Bradshaw is an unincorporated community located in central Jackson County, Kentucky, United States. The community is located on US Route 421 at its intersection with Kentucky Route 587, 3 miles east of McKee, the county seat.

A post office was established in the community in 1907, but it was closed in 1938.
