= Clover Bottom =

Clover Bottom may refer to:

- Clover Bottom Mansion in Tennessee
- Clover Bottom, Kentucky
- Clover Bottom, Missouri
