= Freddie Langdon =

American musician

Fred "Freddie" Eugene Langdon (February 23, 1922 – August 2, 1988) was a world champion fiddle player.

== Biography ==
Langdon was born in the small town of Annville, Kentucky, and learned to play the fiddle by ear at a very early age.

He obtained most of his fame on the Cincinnati-based WLW-TV show "Midwestern Hayride" as the fiddle player on the show.

Langdon played with well-known greats like Kenny Price, Bonnie Lou, Buddy Ross and Jay Neas. He also sang backup for James Brown at King Records in Cincinnati, OH in the early 1960s.

He got his start in country music at Renfro Valley in Kentucky.

Langdon also appeared on the Arthur Godfrey show in the late 1950s.

Langdon, Price, Ross and Jay Neas were part of a country music band called "The Hometowners"

Langdon died of liver cancer in 1988. His survivors are wife, Faye, and son, James (Jamie), Worthington, OH and children from a previous marriage, Lynda, Barry, Larry, Donna, Devona, and eleven grandchildren.

== Other instruments played ==
- Bass
- Guitar

== Discography ==
- Freddie Fiddles Around (1974 - Artist's Recordings)
- Closest Thing to Love/Mama Call Me Home - Single (1978 - AMG)
