= Egypt, Kentucky =

Unincorporated community in Kentucky, United States

- Unincorporated community
- Location within Kentucky Location within the United States
- Coordinates: 37°18′47″N 83°53′46″W
- Country: United States
- State: Kentucky
- County: Jackson
- Elevation: 1,135 ft (346 m)
- Time zone: UTC-6 (Eastern Time Zone)
  - Summer (DST): UTC-5 (Eastern Daylight Time)
- GNIS feature ID

Egypt is an unincorporated community located in Jackson County, Kentucky, United States. Their post office has been closed.

A post office was established in the community in 1876, and was given the name Egypt by the newly transplanted Amyx family who felt homesick in the rural backwater, as if they had been exiled to Egypt.
