= Ray Cummins (guitarist) =

American singer-songwriter and guitarist

Ray Cummins is an American guitarist.

== Early life ==
Ray started playing music at the early age of 5. This took place in Northern Kentucky. His first instrument was a 12 bass accordion. By the time he was in the fourth grade, he had studied piano and accordion and had graduated to a 120 bass accordion. By the fifth grade he started playing the trumpet. By the sixth grade he was playing first chair trumpet in the elementary band. In the seventh grade he was the only seventh grader playing in the high school band. By this time he realized he wanted to become a trumpet player like Al Hirt. He learned to play many of Al Hirt's songs by ear and one of his favorites was "Walkin". Ray noticed that this song was produced by Chet Atkins and written by Jerry Reed but he was not familiar with them at that time. By the tenth grade he was just starting to study trumpet at the Cincinnati Conservatory of Music from the first chair trumpet player of the Cincinnati Symphony.

By the time he was 16, Ray became very ill and was bedridden. Due to his illness he could no longer play the trumpet and his father bought him a used guitar and a Chet Atkins record album. The album was "The Pops Goes Country" featuring the Boston Pops Orchestra. Hearing play was one of the greatest sounds he had ever heard and experienced. Ray dreamed of playing "Alabama Jubilee" like Chet with the symphony. Today he has 10 songs for symphony and plays that same arrangement with symphonies, so dreams do come true.

== Recording career ==
By the time he was 21, Ray started playing with RCA Records recording artist, Kenny Price. Kenny lived in Florence, KY which is in Boone County. He had the big hit on RCA, "Sheriff of Boone County". He toured with Kenny as a featured guitarist with package tours, consisting of people such as Ernest Tubb, the Osborne Brothers, Cal Smith, Leona Williams, and many others. He did one tour when Billy Bryd came back with Ernest Tubb. Kenny would feature Ray every night soloing on the guitar. Ray would even entertain the Grand Ole Opry stars in the hotel room, dazzling them with his guitar techniques.

Between the tours with Kenny during those 10 years, Ray played hotels and clubs performing music from top 40 to country. He also did over 500 albums as a studio musician including mostly gospel and country.

He is currently playing churches, gospel concerts, and making appearances with major symphonies as a guest artist.

Ray Cummins has performed with the guitarist, Les Paul. He has played on a compilation CD with Chet Atkins. He has been a featured guitarist with the late Kenny Price.
