= Clover Bottom, Kentucky =

Unincorporated community in Kentucky, United States

- Unincorporated community
- Location within Kentucky Location within the United States
- Coordinates: 37°29′56″N 84°09′05″W
- Country: United States
- State: Kentucky
- County: Jackson
- Elevation: 1,457 ft (444 m)
- Time zone: UTC-5 (Eastern (EST))
  - Summer (DST): UTC-4 (EST)
- ZIP codes: 40447 (McKee), 40481 (Sand Gap)
- Area code: 606
- GNIS feature ID

Clover Bottom is an unincorporated community located in northern Jackson County, Kentucky, United States. The community is located along US 421 at its intersection with Kentucky Route 1955. It is 3.4 miles northwest of Sandgap and 9.3 miles southeast of Berea. The community is addressed to McKee's ZIP code 40447, despite being past Sandgap, which has its own post office with ZIP code 40481, which partially serves the area around Clover Bottom.

The community had a post office which opened up in 1862, but has since closed. Another historical building in the community is the Clover Bottom School.
