= Jackson County High School =

Coordinates: 37°26′12″N 83°59′11″W

Location
- 560 Educational Mountain Drive; McKee, (Jackson County), Kentucky 40447; United States

Information
- Type: Public high school
- School district: Jackson County Schools
- Principal: Brian Harris
- Teaching staff: 32.60 (FTE)
- Enrollment: 551 (2023-2024)
- Student to teacher ratio: 16.90
- Colors: Red, white and blue
- Nickname: Generals
- Website: https://www.jacksoncohigh.net/o/jchs

Jackson County High School (JCHS) is a public high school which was established in 1967 and is located in the City of McKee, KY. It serves around 600 students in Jackson County, KY and McKee, KY in grades 9th through 12th. The school is located at the Jackson County Educational Complex which also consists of the Jackson County Area Technology Center, Jackson County Community Auditorium, a football stadium, baseball/softball fields, and the Jackson County Continuing Education Center.

== History ==
On September 18, 1989, Dustin L. Pierce, a senior at the school, armed himself with a shotgun and two handguns and took a history classroom hostage. The subsequent standoff with police lasted for nine hours and was resolved without incident. In the aftermath of the standoff, police found a copy of Rage among the possessions in Pierce's bedroom, leading to speculation that he had been inspired to carry out the plot of the novel.
