= Kentucky Route 354 =

State highway in Kentucky, United States

Kentucky Route 354
- Tobacco Road
- KY 354 highlighted in red

Route information
- Maintained by KYTC
- Length: 1.106 mi (1.780 km)

Major junctions
- South end: KY 80 in London
- North end: Hal Rogers Parkway / KY 30 in London

Location
- Country: United States
- State: Kentucky
- Counties: Laurel

Highway system
- Kentucky State Highway System; Interstate; US; State; Parkways
← KY 353	→ KY 355

Kentucky Route 354 (KY 354) is a 1.106-mile-long (1.780 km) state highway in the U.S. state of Kentucky. The highway travels through portions of London, in Laurel County.

== Route description ==
KY 354 begins at an intersection with KY 80 (East 4th Street) in the northeastern part of London, within Laurel County. It travels to the north-northwest, paralleling railroad tracks of CSX. It curves to the north-northeast, leaving the railroad tracks. It curves to the northwest and the north-northwest and meets its northern terminus, an intersection with the Hal Rogers Parkway. Here, the roadway continues as KY 30.

== History ==
KY 354 was formed in the 1970s when the intersecting section of the Hal Rogers Parkway was built.

The original KY 354 ran from KY 15 in Sassafras north to Kelly Fork; most of this road became an extension of KY 1088, and the rest is now Kelly Fork Road.

== Major intersections ==
The entire route is in London, Laurel County.

mi	km	Destinations	Notes
0.000	0.000	KY 80 (East 4th Street)	Southern terminus
1.106	1.780	Hal Rogers Parkway / KY 30 north – Somerset, Hazard	Northern terminus of KY 354; southern terminus of KY 30
1.000 mi = 1.609 km; 1.000 km = 0.621 mi
