= Arthur Lakes Log House =

Historic house in Kentucky, United States

- Lakes, Arthur, Log House
- U.S. National Register of Historic Places
- Location within Kentucky Location within the United States
- Location: 401 Lakes Creek Rd., McKee, Kentucky
- Coordinates: 37°29′23″N 83°57′34″W
- Area: 7 acres (2.8 ha)
- Built: c.1890
- Architectural style: Log saddlebag architecture
- NRHP reference No.: 00000867
- Added to NRHP: October 23, 2000

The Arthur Lakes Log House, located at 401 Lakes Creek Rd. in McKee, Kentucky, United States, was built in about 1890. It was listed on the National Register of Historic Places in 2000.

It is a saddlebag house with two rooms, a log house about 30 feet (9.1 m) long and 14 feet (4.3 m) deep. It was built of oak logs on the bottom, tulip poplar in the middle, and pine logs at the top, with half-dove tail notching.
