= Midwestern Hayride =

- Country of origin: United States

Original release
- Network: WLW-T; NBC; ABC
- Release: 1951 – 1959

Midwestern Hayride, sometimes known as Midwest Hayride and later Hayride, is an American country music show originating in the 1930s from radio station WLW and later from television station WLW-T in Cincinnati, Ohio. During the 1950s it was carried nationally by NBC and then ABC television.

The program featured live country music (performed mainly by local musicians but on lesser occasions by national stars) and what was then called "hayseed" comedy, much of which was the inspiration for the later TV series Hee Haw. It is credited as the first country music program regularly broadcast by a national network.

== History ==
Inspired by the Shreveport-based Louisiana Hayride, the show was originally called Boone County Jamboree (named for nearby Boone County in Northern Kentucky). Midwestern Hayride was first broadcast before 1937 and was carried live on radio each Saturday evening through the early 1970s.

Television station WLW-T came on the air in 1948, sharing larger quarters with radio station WLW in the former Elks Building, re-christened Crosley Square. It eventually became the originating studio for the regional network Avco Broadcasting Corporation, which included WLW-A in Atlanta, WLW-D in Dayton, WLW-C in Columbus and later WLW-I in Indianapolis (after WLW-A was sold) when the program moved to television in the early 1950s. Then originating from WLW-T, Midwestern Hayride was simulcast on WLW radio until the early 1960s, then was revived in the mid-1960s. At the show's peak, there was a one-year waiting list for tickets to be in the audience (100 people was the limit for each weekly show).

In 1951, Midwestern Hayride was picked up by NBC as a summer replacement for Sid Caesar's Your Show of Shows. NBC aired it each of the following summers through 1956, except 1953. ABC then carried it during the summers of 1957–59. For much of its television run MH was hosted by Dean Richards, lead vocalist of The Lucky Pennies, a local singing group. Richards also introduced a "Polka Time" segment (geared to Cincinnati's German heritage and its local breweries) aired near the program's close until 1969, when he was replaced by Henson Cargill riding on the success of his hit song "Skip a Rope".

By the early 1970s, then-16 year MH veteran Kenny Price, a popular musician and comedian nicknamed The Round Mound of Sound, had a string of country hits for RCA Records including local favorite "The Sheriff of Boone County". On the strength of those hits, Price was picked to be the new host of the show, which by then had shortened its name to Hayride (Louisiana Hayride had succumbed to rock and roll's popularity and left the airwaves by 1960).

Like many other locally produced shows of the day, Hayride become increasingly more expensive to produce, and WLW-TV executives decided to bring the show to an end in 1972. Kenny Price became a regular on Nashville-based Hee Haw four years later and remained there until his death in 1987.

In 2009, WYNS-FM, a low-power community FM station in Waynesville, Ohio (north of Cincinnati), announced it would commence a similar live weekly country music broadcast, The Ohio Hayride, beginning May 15, 2010. The local program, possibly the first of its kind since the demise of Hayride, was to feature local musicians as well as country music artists from past decades. The program was also to air on WPFB-AM in Middletown, Ohio and stream from the WYNS station website at www.hybridfm.net.

== Performers ==
- Herb & Kay Adams
- Vic Bellamy
- Bobby Bobo
- Girls of The Golden West
- Judy Perkins
- Skeeter Bonn
- Bonnie Lou
- Phyllis Brown
- Brown's Ferry Four
- Slim Bryant
- Chris "Milkman" Scheid
- Jerry Byrd
- The Country Briarhoppers
- Cowboy Copas
- Hugh Cross
- Lazy Jim Day
- The Delmore Brothers
- The DeZurik Sisters
- Little Jimmy Dickens
- Smokey Duvall
- Too Slim Bobby Simpson
- Clay Eager
- Louie Ennis
- Shug Fisher
- Sonny Fleming
- Betty Foley
- Red Foley
- Whitey Ford
- Geer Sisters
- Charlie Gore and the Rangers
- Otto Gray
- Rudy Hanson
- Ted "Gas House" Hensley
- Billy Holmes
- Salty Holmes
- Homer and Jethro
- The Hometowners
- Louie Innis
- Rome Johnson
- Tommy Jackson
- Grandpa Jones
- Lee Jones
- Judy and Jen
- Junior Kentucky Briarhoppers
- Harpo Kidwell
- Bradley Kincaid
- Slim King
- John Lair
- Freddie Langdon
- Dixie Lee
- Ernie Lee
- Freddie Langdon
- Pa and Ma McCormick
- Clayton McMichen
- Joe Maphis
- Sleepy Marlin
- The Mid-Westerners
- Carl Moore
- Natchee the Indian Fiddler
- Jay Near
- Willie Nelson
- Mattie O'Neil
- Jimmy Osborne
- Dolly Parton
- Hank Penny
- Judy Perkins
- Prairie Ramblers
- Kenny Price
- The Kentucky Boys
- Riley Puckett
- Rangers Quartet
- Brownie Reynolds
- Dean Richards
- Jerry Richards
- Tex Ritter
- Kenny Roberts
- Jack Rogers
- Mimi Roman
- Buddy Ross
- Helen and Billy Scott
- Colleen Sharp
- Billy Strickland
- Swannee River Boys
- Garry "2 Tall" Grammell
- Willie Thall
- The Lucky Pennies
- The Three Ks
- The Trailhands
- Merle Travis
- Red Turner
- Zeke Turner
- Porter Wagoner
- Tommy Watson
- Tex Walls
- Penny West
- Joy Whitaker
- Willis Brothers
- Dom Rockin Horse Mason
- Jim Wood
- Helen Diller
- Chuck Wright
- John "Gut Bucket" Halcomb
- Zeke and Bill
- Jeannie Hogan
- Judy Martin (Accordion on Saturday broadcast)
- Creola Faye Knear-Dorning (midwestern Dancer)
- Ky. Briarhoppers

== Network television broadcast history ==
(all times are Eastern Time—all running times include commercial breaks)
NBC:

- June 16–September 1951: Saturday 9–10 p.m.
- June–September 1952: Tuesday 8–9 p.m.
- June–September 1954: Tuesday 8–8:30 p.m.
- May–September 1955: Friday 8–8:30 p.m.
- September 1955–June 1956: Wednesday 10–10:30 p.m.

The program was also occasionally carried by NBC outside of prime time during the regular season.

ABC:

- July–October 1957: Sunday 9:30–10 p.m.
- January–September 1958: Saturday 10–10:30 p.m.
- May–September 6, 1959: Sunday 7–7:30 p.m.
