= Kentucky Route 3630 =

State highway in Kentucky, United States

Kentucky Route 3630
- KY 3630 highlighted in red

Route information
- Maintained by KYTC
- Length: 28.401 mi (45.707 km)

Major junctions
- West end: KY 578 in Laurel County
- East end: KY 30 in Annville

Location
- Country: United States
- State: Kentucky
- Counties: Laurel, Jackson

Highway system
- Kentucky State Highway System; Interstate; US; State; Parkways

Kentucky Route 3630 is an east–west state highway in Jackson and Laurel Counties. The route was formerly KY 30 until it was rerouted.

== Route description ==
KY 3630 begins at an intersection with KY 578 in Laurel County, heading north on a two-lane undivided road. The route passes through farmland with some homes and curves to the northwest. The road heads into a mix of farms and woods, winding north and entering Jackson County. KY 3630 heads west and intersects the southern terminus of KY 577. The route turns to the north and winds through more wooded areas with some fields, turning northeast and intersecting the southern terminus of KY 2002. The road heads through several more miles of rural areas with some homes and curves to the east. KY 3630 intersects the southern terminus of KY 290 and heads into Annville, where it passes through residential areas. In the center of Annville, the route forms a brief concurrency with KY 578 and curves northeast as it comes to the junction with KY 3444. KY 3630 heads through more rural areas with some development before coming to its eastern terminus at KY 30. At this point, the road continues east as part of KY 30.

== Major intersections ==
County	Location	mi	km	Destinations	Notes
Laurel		0.000	0.000	KY 578	
Jackson		2.323	3.739	KY 577	
Jackson		4.645	7.475	KY 2002	
Jackson	Annville	9.344	15.038	KY 290	
Jackson	Annville	10.099	16.253	KY 578 south	West end of KY 578 overlap
Jackson	Annville	10.272	16.531	KY 578 north	East end of KY 578 overlap
Jackson	Annville	10.355	16.665	KY 3444	
Jackson	Annville	11.035	17.759	KY 3629	
Jackson		11.561	18.606	KY 3443	
Jackson	Tyner	14.203	22.858	US 421 south	West end of US 421 overlap
Jackson		15.017	24.168	US 421 north	East end of US 421 overlap
Jackson		17.314	27.864	KY 1431	
Owsley		23.634	38.035	KY 1071	
Owsley		24.013	38.645	KY 1071	
Owsley		26.815	43.155	KY 846	
Owsley		28.401	45.707	End of State Maintenance	
1.000 mi = 1.609 km; 1.000 km = 0.621 mi: Concurrency terminus
