= Jackson County, Kentucky =

County in Kentucky, United States

- County
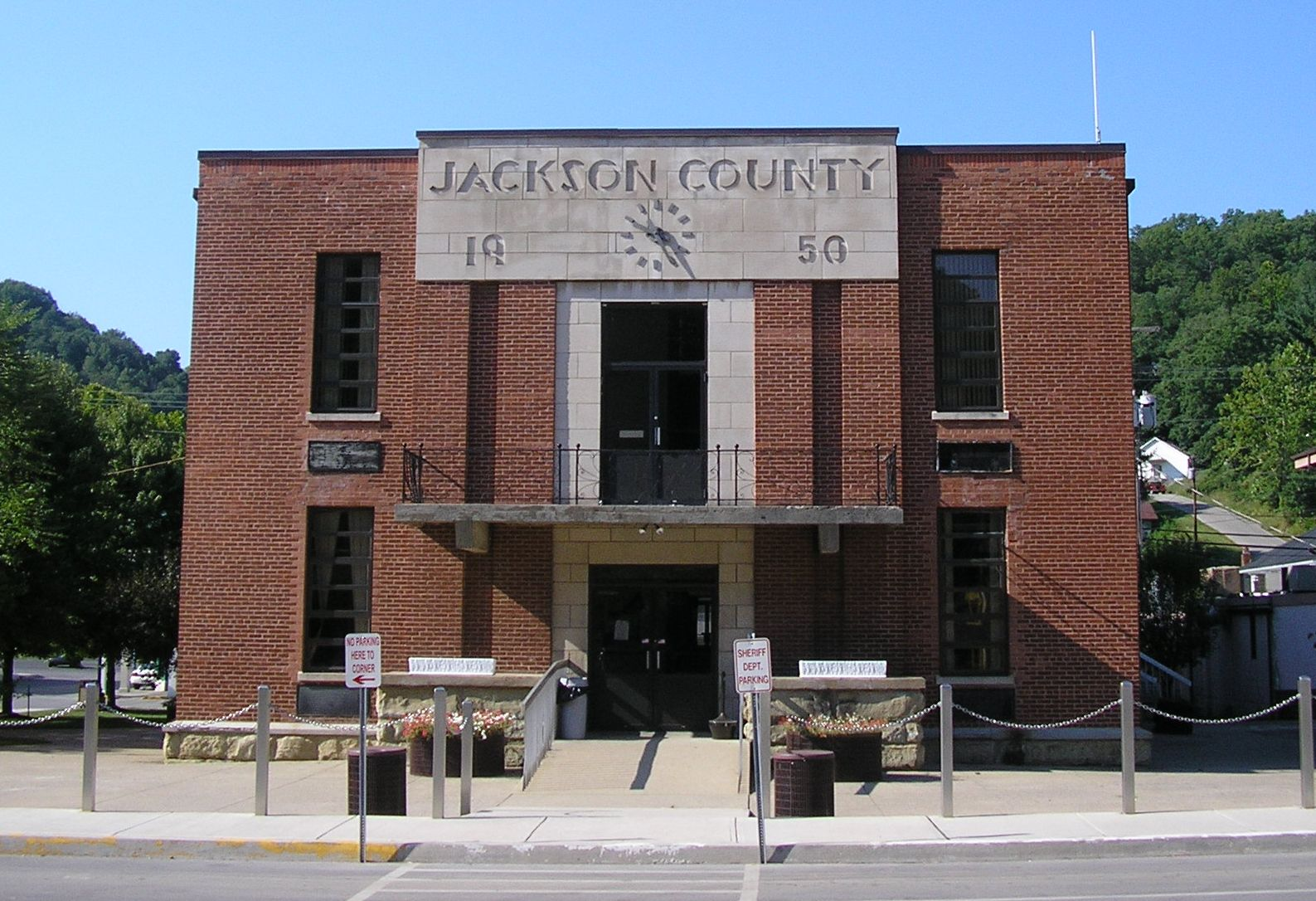
- Jackson County courthouse in McKee
- Motto(s): Where the Mountains and the Bluegrass Blend
- Location within the U.S. state of Kentucky
- Coordinates: 37°25′N 84°01′W
- Country: United States
- State: Kentucky
- Founded: 1858
- Named for: Andrew Jackson
- Seat: McKee
- Largest community: Annville

Government
  - Judge/Executive: Paul Hays (R) (interim)

Area
  - Total: 347 sq mi (900 km^{2})
  - Land: 345 sq mi (890 km^{2})
  - Water: 1.3 sq mi (3.4 km^{2}) 0.4%

Population (2020)
  - Total: 12,955
  - Estimate (2025): 13,325 ▲
  - Density: 37.6/sq mi (14.5/km^{2})
- Time zone: UTC−5 (Eastern)
  - Summer (DST): UTC−4 (EDT)
- ZIP Codes: 40447, 40402, 40434, 40481, 40486
- Website: https://jacksoncounty.ky.gov/Pages/index.aspx

Jackson County is a county located in the Commonwealth of Kentucky. As of the 2020 census, the population was 12,955. Its county seat is McKee. The county was formed in 1858 from land given by Madison, Estill, Owsley, Clay, Laurel, and Rockcastle counties. It was named for Andrew Jackson, seventh President of the United States. Jackson County became a moist county via a "local-option" referendum in late 2019 that legalized the sale of alcoholic beverages in the city of McKee.

One fourth of Jackson County is within the Daniel Boone National Forest (56,000 acres), making it representative of eastern Kentucky's unique Appalachian topography, wildlife, and heritage. The county is home to many attractions and recreation spots such as Flat Lick Falls, public national forest campgrounds Turkey Foot and S-Tree, and the centermost trailhead (located in the county seat, McKee) of the historic Sheltowee Trace.

Jackson County is the birthplace of the Grand Ole Opry star David "Stringbean" Akeman, and the site of the annually reenacted Battle of Big Hill, the Civil War skirmish that led to the Battle of Richmond in Madison County.

== Outdoor recreation ==
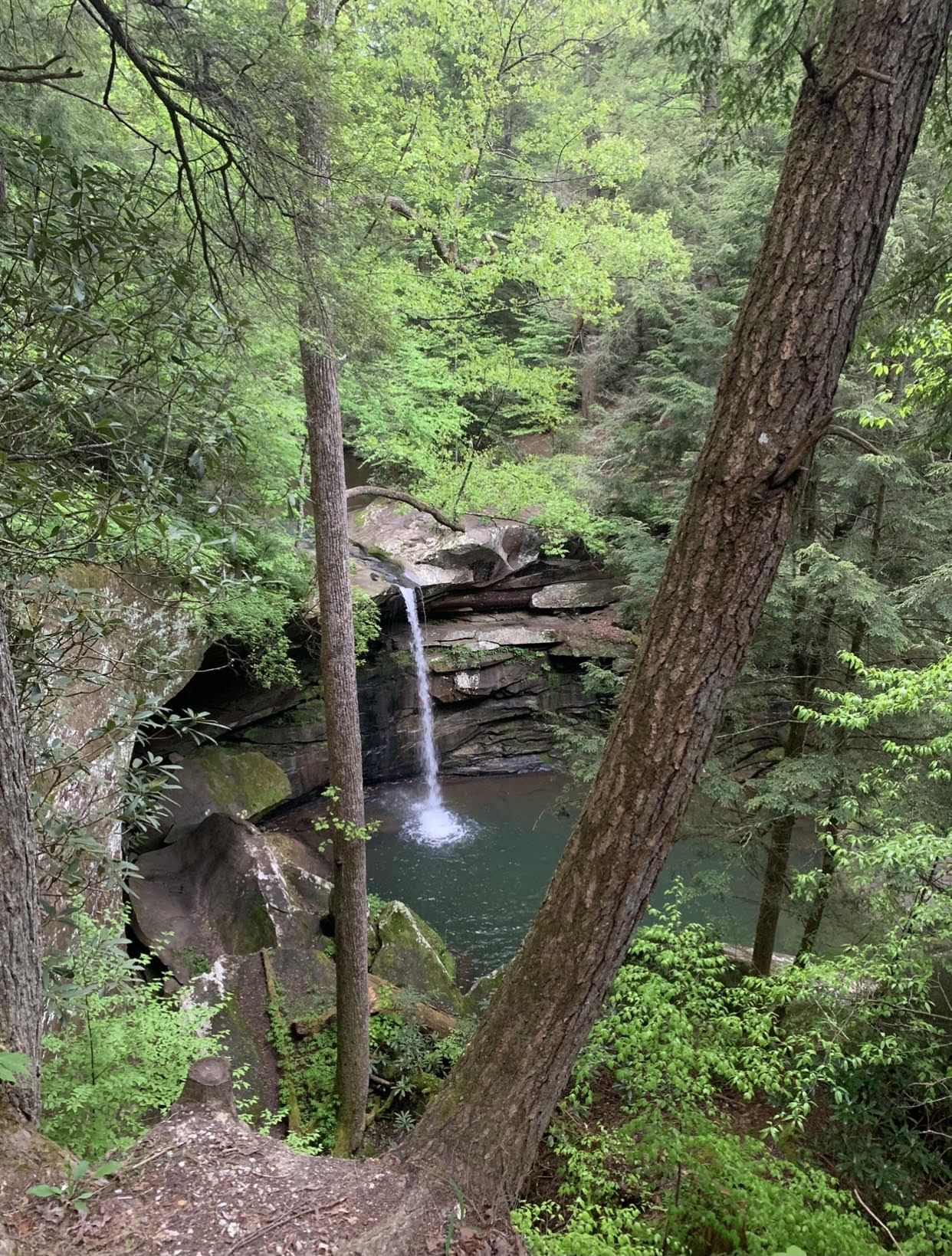
Flat Lick Falls

=== National recreation areas ===
The S-Tree campground sits on a ridge above Horse Lick Creek near McKee in Jackson County. A small picnic area features a historic picnic shelter that was constructed in the 1930s by the Civilian Conservation Corps. The campground receives heavy weekend use from off-highway vehicle users who ride the adjacent Sheltowee Trace National Recreation Trail and the Renfro Loop Trail. These trails may be accessed from the campground.

The Turkey Foot campground is along the banks of War Fork Creek in Jackson County. The creek is stocked with trout throughout the year. All of the campsites are wooded. A playfield with a horseshoe pit is located at the end of camping sites alongside the creek. Trails include the Turkey Foot Loop Trail and the Sheltowee Trace National Recreation Trail.

Flat Lick Falls is tucked into the hills of southern Jackson County and consists of recreational facilities which include primitive camping, picnic shelters, and restrooms. The park features 86.09 acres of wooded land, cliffs and Flat Lick Creek running through the middle of the park with a 28-foot water fall emptying into a large pool at the bottom of the falls. The creek flows into the Laurel Fork Creek. The falls can be viewed up close via the meandering paths along the cliff line including a paved path leading to a wheelchair accessible viewing platform.

Sheltowee Trace National Recreation Trail is over 300 miles of National Recreation Trail, established in 1979, in the Appalachian region of the Eastern U.S., and reaches from northern Rowan County, Kentucky to the Leather Wood Trail Head in the Big South Fork National River and Recreation Area just across the Tennessee border. The Trail runs mostly through the Daniel Boone National Forest, and is named for the Shawnee word for “Big Turtle”, which was the name given to Daniel Boone in 1779 when he was adopted as the son of the great warrior chief Blackfish. Jackson County encompasses approximately 35 miles of the Sheltowee Trace, which is open to hiking, horseback riding, and mountain bikes. Some sections also allow all-terrain vehicles.

=== National protected areas ===
- Daniel Boone National Forest (part)

== Geography ==
Jackson County is located on the edge of the Cumberland Plateau and Eastern Kentucky Coalfields region of Kentucky, adjacent to the Kentucky Bluegrass region. Because of this, the county's motto is "where the mountains and the bluegrass blend." The elevation of the county ranges from 600 ft. to 1600 ft. above sea level. The Middle Fork of the Rockcastle River originates in southern Jackson County. Karst landscapes can also be found in the northern part of the county, creating notable caves such as Wind Cave near Turkey Foot campground.

=== Major routes ===
- US Route 421
- KY Route 30
- KY Route 290
- KY Route 3630 (Old KY Route 30)

US Route 421 serves as the county's north–south corridor, connecting it to Madison County, the cities of Richmond and Berea, and I-75 to the north. While it connects the county to Clay County, the city of Manchester, and the Hal Rogers Parkway to the south. This route also connects the communities of Sandgap, McKee and Tyner within the county.

KY Route 30 is a newly constructed highway that serves as the main east–west corridor, passing through the southern part of the county, through the communities of Annville and Tyner. It is referred to as the Interstate 75 - Mountain Parkway connector. It connects the county to both of these major freeways as well as to the cities of London (Laurel County), Booneville (Owsley County), and Beattyville (Lee County).

KY Route 290 connects US Route 421 in McKee to KY Route 3630 in Annville.

=== Adjacent counties ===
- Estill County (north)
- Lee County (northeast)
- Owsley County (east)
- Clay County (southeast)
- Laurel County (southwest)
- Rockcastle County (west)
- Madison County (northwest)

== Events ==
=== Jackson County Fair & Homecoming ===
This event is held annually on the Friday and Saturday before Labor Day. Activities include a show, craft exhibits, musical entertainment, clogging, vendors, food trucks, and a parade.

=== Sheltowee Trace Artisans Fair ===
Local and guest artisans from across the state and beyond come to teach, demonstrate, and sell their crafts at this event, which is held during the first weekend in May.

=== Battle of Big Hill Reenactment ===
The reenactment takes place the third weekend of August at the Jackson Energy Farm on HWY 290, about 6 miles south of McKee. A family-friendly outdoor event, reenactments generally take place over two days, and consist of games, historical speakers, a ladies and gentlemen's tea, food, and music before the actual battle. After dark, couples can follow the cues of the square dancing caller at the Civil War Ball, featuring local musicians playing songs from the era.

=== Stringbean Music Festival ===
Most people remember David "Stringbean" Akemon from the old television show "Hee-Haw" but folks in Jackson County knew him as brother, uncle, and friend. Although a famous performer, "Stringbean" returned often to his home in Jackson County. In June 1996, Porter Wagoner, Grandpa & Ramona Jones, Mac Wiseman and a host of other entertainers and friends gathered to unveil a larger than life statue of Stringbean, and established a memorial in his honor. Since then, the festive has grown tremendously. Today, two festivals are held - one in June and one in October - and both feature nationally known bluegrass music performers, as well as mountain arts and crafts.

=== ARA Boone Forest Rally ===
Since 2023, the American Rally Association's Boone Forest Rally is held annually in sections of Boone National Forest throughout Jackson County. The rally is typically held in late July or early August each year.

== Economy ==
The Jackson County Industrial Development Authority (JCIDA) assists with economic development efforts in the county. The authority manages 3 industrial parks in the county which include the Jackson County Regional Industrial Park in Annville, the McKee Industrial Park in McKee, and the Northern Jackson County Industrial Park in Sandgap.

Major employers in Jackson County include:

- Jackson County Public Schools
- People's Rural Telephone Cooperative (PRTC)
- Jackson Energy Cooperative
- Bear Precision Coatings
- DTS Industries
- JC Tech Industries
- The Allen Company (Clover Bottom Limestone Quarry)
- Phillips Diversified Manufacturing
- Senture
- Teleworks USA

== Utilities ==
Jackson County is served by Jackson Energy, which is based in the City of McKee, and serves Jackson County and surrounding counties such as Lee County, Owsley County, Clay County, Laurel County, Rockcastle County, and Madison County. Jackson County, Owsley County, and Clay County are served by Peoples Rural Telephone Cooperative, also based in the City of McKee. Water is provided by the Jackson County Water Association and garbage pickup is provided by Woods Sanitation. Residents within the City of McKee are served by McKee Water and Sewer.

== Healthcare ==
Jackson County does not have a hospital. Nearby facilities include Saint Joseph Hospital (Berea), Baptist Health Hospital (Richmond), Advent Health (Manchester), Saint Joseph Hospital (London) and, Rockcastle Regional Hospital. (Mt. Vernon)

Emergency medical services for Jackson County are provided by the Jackson County Ambulance Service. Jackson County does have a few primary care facilities which include the White House Clinic, McKee Medical Clinic, Advent Health Clinic, and Annville Medical Clinic.

== Demographics ==
Historical population
Census	Pop.	Note	%±
1860	3,087		—
1870	4,547		47.3%
1880	6,678		46.9%
1890	8,261		23.7%
1900	10,561		27.8%
1910	10,734		1.6%
1920	11,687		8.9%
1930	10,467		−10.4%
1940	16,339		56.1%
1950	13,101		−19.8%
1960	10,677		−18.5%
1970	10,005		−6.3%
1980	11,996		19.9%
1990	11,955		−0.3%
2000	13,495		12.9%
2010	13,494		0.0%
2020	12,955		−4.0%
2025 (est.)	13,325	▲	2.9%
U.S. Decennial Census; 1790-1960 1900-1990; 1990-2000 2010-2020

=== 2020 census ===
As of the 2020 census, the county had a population of 12,955. The median age was 42.1 years. 22.9% of residents were under the age of 18 and 18.4% of residents were 65 years of age or older. For every 100 females there were 98.8 males, and for every 100 females age 18 and over there were 95.7 males age 18 and over.

The racial makeup of the county was 96.9% White, 0.1% Black or African American, 0.3% American Indian and Alaska Native, 0.1% Asian, 0.0% Native Hawaiian and Pacific Islander, 0.2% from some other race, and 2.2% from two or more races. Hispanic or Latino residents of any race comprised 0.7% of the population.

0.0% of residents lived in urban areas, while 100.0% lived in rural areas.

There were 5,244 households in the county, of which 29.6% had children under the age of 18 living with them and 26.1% had a female householder with no spouse or partner present. About 28.0% of all households were made up of individuals and 13.7% had someone living alone who was 65 years of age or older.

There were 5,954 housing units, of which 11.9% were vacant. Among occupied housing units, 76.3% were owner-occupied and 23.7% were renter-occupied. The homeowner vacancy rate was 0.8% and the rental vacancy rate was 7.3%.

== Communities ==
=== City ===
- McKee (county seat)

=== Census-designated place ===
- Annville (largest community)

=== Unincorporated places ===
- Gray Hawk
- Sand Gap
- Tyner

== Politics ==
United States presidential election results for Jackson County, Kentucky
Year	Republican		Democratic		Third party(ies)	
Year	No.	%	No.	%	No.	%
1912	577	34.14%	216	12.78%	897	53.08%
1916	1,968	87.90%	252	11.26%	19	0.85%
1920	3,174	92.16%	260	7.55%	10	0.29%
1924	2,629	87.96%	284	9.50%	76	2.54%
1928	3,552	96.52%	123	3.34%	5	0.14%
1932	2,879	84.28%	529	15.49%	8	0.23%
1936	3,440	89.05%	420	10.87%	3	0.08%
1940	3,722	88.62%	465	11.07%	13	0.31%
1944	3,578	91.56%	328	8.39%	2	0.05%
1948	2,781	85.99%	429	13.27%	24	0.74%
1952	3,104	86.75%	471	13.16%	3	0.08%
1956	3,950	88.35%	501	11.21%	20	0.45%
1960	3,923	90.35%	419	9.65%	0	0.00%
1964	2,654	73.78%	920	25.58%	23	0.64%
1968	3,098	84.09%	304	8.25%	282	7.65%
1972	5,303	92.18%	436	7.58%	14	0.24%
1976	2,766	79.80%	680	19.62%	20	0.58%
1980	3,379	81.95%	702	17.03%	42	1.02%
1984	3,856	87.38%	542	12.28%	15	0.34%
1988	3,926	85.16%	678	14.71%	6	0.13%
1992	3,398	74.96%	776	17.12%	359	7.92%
1996	3,045	69.98%	960	22.06%	346	7.95%
2000	4,079	84.02%	701	14.44%	75	1.54%
2004	4,369	84.38%	769	14.85%	40	0.77%
2008	4,407	84.36%	743	14.22%	74	1.42%
2012	4,365	86.25%	612	12.09%	84	1.66%
2016	4,889	88.87%	482	8.76%	130	2.36%
2020	5,453	89.20%	605	9.90%	55	0.90%
2024	5,358	90.14%	506	8.51%	80	1.35%

In presidential elections, Jackson County has voted Republican since the Civil War and has never voted Democratic. Lyndon Johnson in 1964 and Bill Clinton in 1996 are the only Democratic candidates to ever win as much as 20% of the county's vote. The only time Jackson County has not voted for the Republican Party was in its first election of 1860 when the county went to Constitutional Unionist John Bell, and in 1912 when the Republican Party was split and third party candidate Theodore Roosevelt carried the county with 52 percent of the vote over William Howard Taft with 34 percent.

Jackson County has a strong history of giving Republican candidates some of their highest winning percentages in the nation. This was the case in the 1928, 1948, 1960, 1976, 1988, and 1992 presidential elections. In 1992 Jackson County, along with Sioux County, Iowa, were the only two counties in the U.S. to vote for Republican George H. W. Bush by over 70 percent in his re-election campaign. Additionally, Republican Alf Landon, who lost 46 of 48 states, received over 89 percent of Jackson County's vote in 1936.

The entirety of Jackson County prohibited the sale of alcoholic beverages from the years 1937 until 2019 when the City of McKee held a vote during the 2019 General Election regarding the ability for the city to grant licenses to businesses for selling alcoholic beverages. The vote's results were 100 in favor of selling alcohol to 81 who were not.

=== Elected officials ===
Elected officials as of January 3, 2025
U.S. House	Hal Rogers (R)	KY 5
Ky. Senate	Robert Stivers (R)	25
Ky. House	Timmy Truett (R)	89

== Education ==
There are no higher education institutes within the county.

=== Public education ===
The county is served by Jackson County Public Schools which operates the following schools:

- McKee Elementary School
- Sand Gap Elementary School
- Tyner Elementary School
- Jackson County Middle School
- Jackson County High School
- Jackson County Area Technology Center

=== Private education ===
- Annville Christian Academy (K-12)

=== Public library ===
Jackson County has a lending library, the Jackson County Public Library, located in downtown McKee.

== Notable people ==
- David "Stringbean" Akeman (1915–1973), country music star
- Andrew N. Johnson (1876–1959), Prohibition Party nominee for vice president of the United States in 1944
- Freddie Langdon (1922–1988), world champion fiddler

== See also ==
- Eastern Kentucky Coalfields Region
- National Register of Historic Places listings in Jackson County, Kentucky
