= Kentucky Route 290 =

State highway in Kentucky, United States

Kentucky Route 290
- KY 290 highlighted in red

Route information
- Maintained by KYTC
- Length: 8.850 mi (14.243 km)

Major junctions
- South end: KY 3630 in Annville
- North end: US 421 in McKee

Location
- Country: United States
- State: Kentucky
- Counties: Jackson

Highway system
- Kentucky State Highway System; Interstate; US; State; Parkways
| ← KY 289 | → KY 291 |

Kentucky Route 290 (KY 290) is a 8.850-mile (14.243 km) north–south road in Jackson County, Kentucky. Its south end is in Annville on KY 3630 and the north end is in Downtown McKee on US 421.

== Route description ==
KY 290 begins at an intersection with KY 3630 in Annville, heading north on a two-lane undivided road. The route heads through a mix of farmland and woodland, coming to an intersection with the northern terminus of KY 578. A short distance later, the road intersects KY 2003. KY 290 continues through more rural areas, heading into the Daniel Boone National Forest. After passing through several miles of dense forest, the route heads into McKee and reaches its northern terminus at an intersection with US 421 in the downtown area.

== History ==
KY 290 was formed by 1950.

The original KY 290 ran from KY 123 in Hailwell east to KY 58 in Clinton; this became part of KY 123 when it was extended.

== Major intersections ==
The entire route is in Jackson County.

| Location | mi | km | Destinations | Notes |
|---|---|---|---|---|
| Annville | 0.000 | 0.000 | KY 3630 | |
| Annville | 1.114 | 1.793 | KY 578 south | |
| Annville | 1.524 | 2.453 | KY 2003 west | |
| McKee | 8.850 | 14.243 | US 421 (Main Street) | |
1.000 mi = 1.609 km; 1.000 km = 0.621 mi
