= Gray Hawk, Kentucky =

Unincorporated community in Kentucky, United States

- Unincorporated community
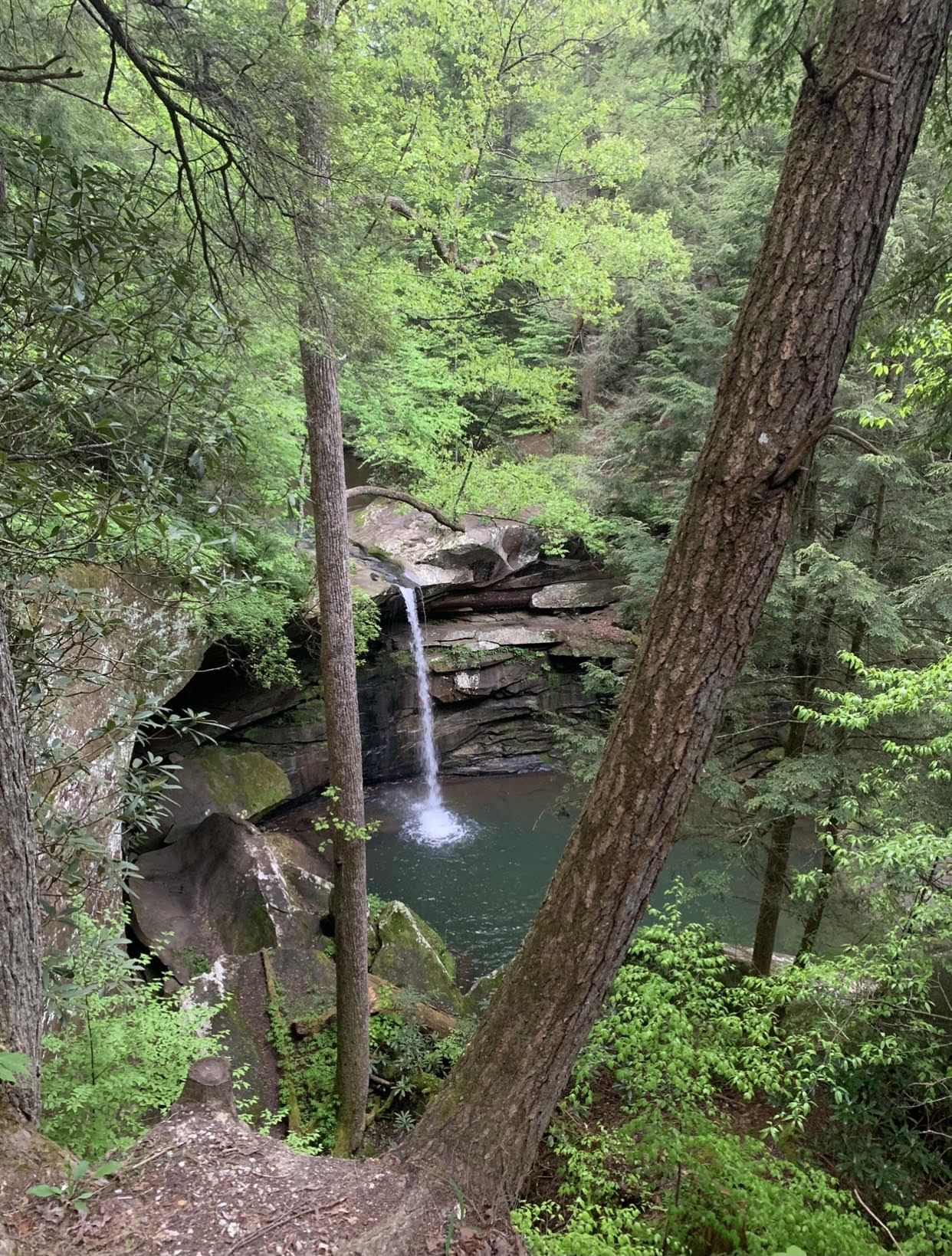
- Flat Lick Falls, located in the community

- Location within Kentucky Location within the United States
- Coordinates: 37°23′42″N 83°56′25″W
- Country: United States
- State: Kentucky
- County: Jackson
- Elevation: 1,273 ft (388 m)
- Time zone: UTC-5 (Eastern (EST))
  - Summer (DST): UTC-4 (EST)
- ZIP codes: 40434
- GNIS feature ID

Gray Hawk is an unincorporated community in eastern Jackson County, Kentucky, United States. The community is located along US Route 421.

Gray Hawk has a post office, gas station, restaurant, community park, and two waterfalls: McCammon Branch Falls and Flat Lick Falls.

== History ==
The Gray Hawk Post Office was established in 1853 and remains open to this day. The origins of the name Gray Hawk remain unclear. It could have been named for the many gray colored hawks seen in the area, or its namesakes could be the original landholding Gray and Hawk families.

The Women's Board of Domestic Missions of the Reformed Church in America opened a church and Sunday Schools in Gray Hawk in the early 1900s. The church is now called the Gray Hawk Community Church.
