= Tyner, Kentucky =

Unincorporated community in Kentucky, United States

- Unincorporated community
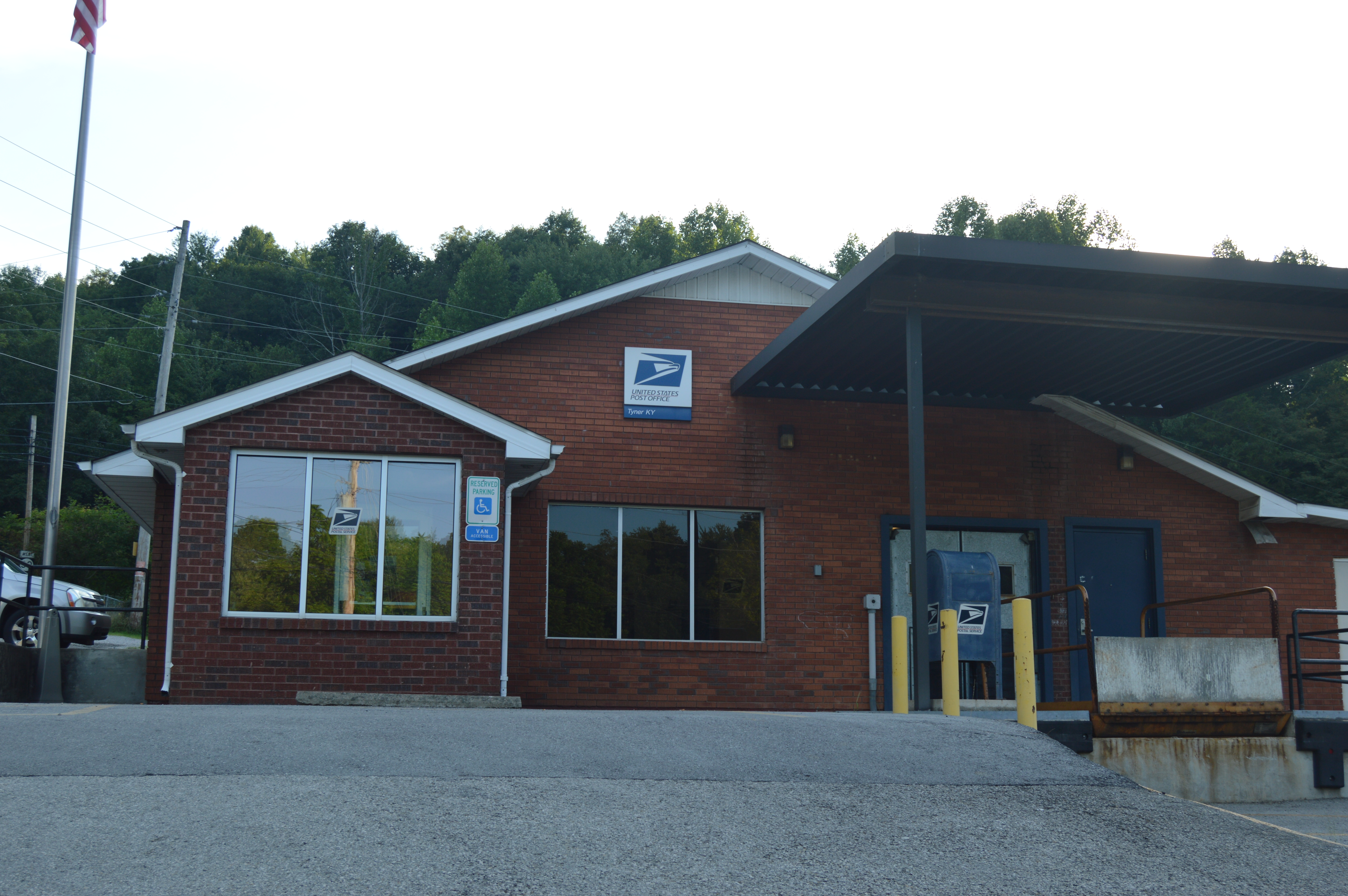
- U.S. Post Office in Tyner

- Location within Kentucky Location within the United States
- Coordinates: 37°20′43″N 83°54′15″W
- Country: United States
- State: Kentucky
- County: Jackson
- Elevation: 1,184 ft (361 m)
- Time zone: UTC-5 (Eastern (EST))
  - Summer (DST): UTC-4 (EDT)
- ZIP codes: 40486
- GNIS feature ID

Tyner is a small, unincorporated community in southeastern Jackson County, KY. The town is located at the junction of U.S. Route 421, KY Route 30 and KY Route 3630. Tyner Elementary School (K-5) is located in the community and is operated by the Jackson County Public School system. The community offers a few services such as a post office, grocery store, and gas station.
