= Travellers Rest, Kentucky =

Unincorporated community in Kentucky, United States

Travellers Rest
- Unincorporated community
- Location within the state of Kentucky Travellers Rest (the United States)
- Coordinates: 37°26′54″N 83°47′14″W
- Country: United States
- State: Kentucky
- County: Owsley
- Elevation: 846 ft (258 m)
- Time zone: UTC-5 (Eastern (EST))
  - Summer (DST): UTC-4 (EDT)
- GNIS feature ID: 516018

Travellers Rest is an unincorporated community located in Owsley County, Kentucky, United States. Their post office closed in June 1964.
