= Annville Institute =

- U.S. National Register of Historic Places
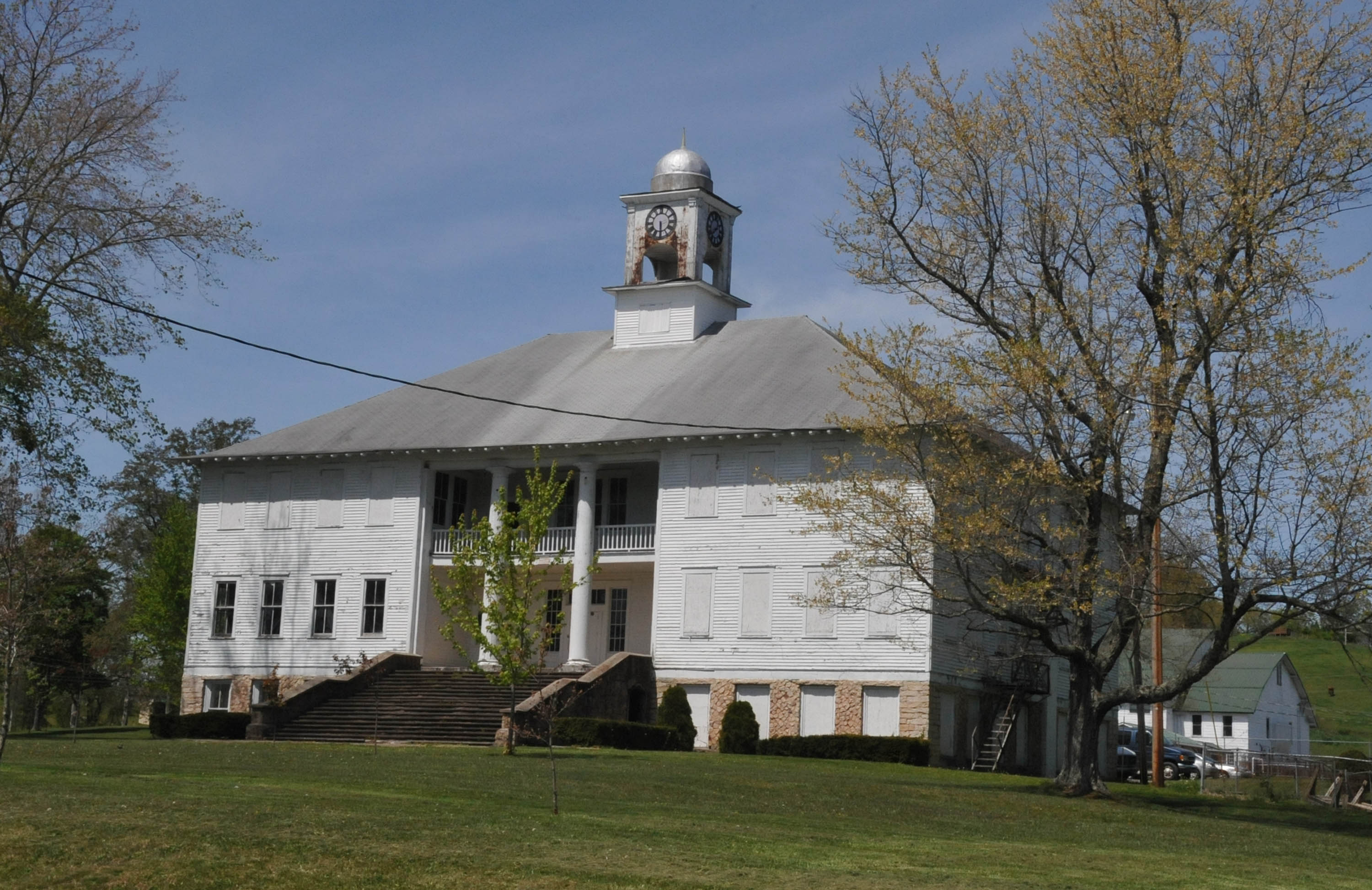
- Lincoln Hall
- Location: 190 Campus Dr., Annville, Kentucky
- Coordinates: 37°19′12″N 83°58′22″W
- NRHP reference No.: 12000043
- Added to NRHP: February 28, 2012

The Annville Institute in Annville, Kentucky was listed on the National Register of Historic Places in 2012. It was originally founded by the Reformed Church in America (RCA) Women's Board of Domestic Missions as an Appalachian settlement school.

== Early years ==
In 1899 the RCA Women's Board of Domestic Missions (WBDM) commissioned two teacher-missionaries from New York to scout out where in Appalachia they should start a mission school. In 1900, they chose McKee, Kentucky for their new school and RCA church. In 1902 the Board's Executive Committee hired Catherine Kastein and Ruth Kerkhof to serve as permanent teachers in the new day school.

In 1905 the McKee Academy, a school building with light, cheery rooms, comfortable seats, and neat desks, was completed and opened to a group of eager children who never before had had an opportunity for regular schooling.

In 1907 the Women's Executive Committee of the WBDM commissioned Mrs. Henrietta Zwemer Te Kolste (1881–1944) to teach and serve as principal at McKee Academy. Within a year she had expanded the school to offer the first high school class. By 1909 the RCA missionaries had also established several Sunday Schools in the area. That year Rev. William A. Worthington (1877–1941), a graduate of New Brunswick Theological Seminary, came to Kentucky in May 1909 as a newly ordained minister commissioned by the RCA Board of Foreign Missions. Rather than go on to his posting in India and stayed and married Henrietta—together they set up a new settlement school on a 75-acre farm near Annville, Kentucky. The land had been purchased by the local RCA supervisor of Kentucky work Rev. Isaac Messler with donations from Mary Bussey, a member of the RCA WBDM, and he laid the foundation of the original school building during the summer of 1909. That winter the Worthingtons were married and came to live in a log cabin that was already on the farm until their new parsonage was built.

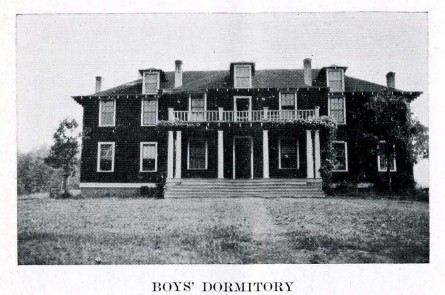
Wooster Hall, boys' dormitory at Annville Institute, from Annville Institute Catalog 1926-1927

In 1910 the new settlement school building, called Lincoln Hall, opened. Within two more years, besides the "Manse" for the Worthingtons, two more buildings went up: the girls' dormitory (Worthington Hall) and the Christine Tracy Memorial Hall (for vocational training schoolrooms and more dormitory space). Twelve boy students laid the foundations, raised the walls and roof as well as a stone wall for their new dormitory (Wooster Hall). Finished in 1915, it housed 24 boys and an apartment for the Dean of Boys along with three rooms for workers. By the summer of 1911, with additional funds donated by Mary Bussing and others from the RCA, the Institute had grown to include a mill, a workshop with tools, farm implements, and animals. The school's enrollment had increased to 152.

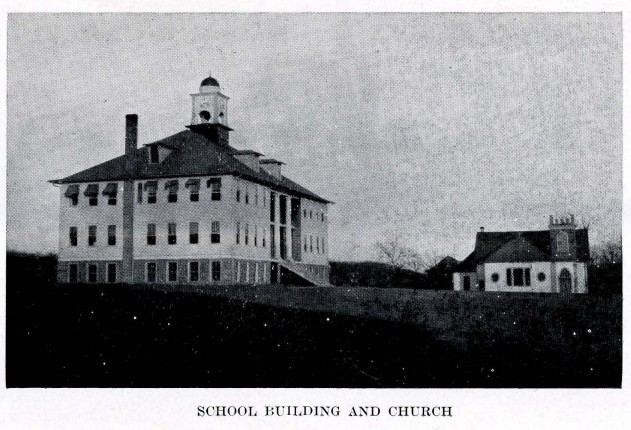
Lincoln Hall and Tanis Chapel, from Annville Institute Catalog 1926-1927

The Tanis Chapel was built in 1916 as a memorial to the daughter Ida of the donor Richard Tanis. Ida Tanis worked at the Annville Institute as a teacher and dean of girls. In 1917 a memorial hospital building was built. With the fire in 1921 destroying Lincoln Hall, another building (later the Community Hall) was raised to hold classes until the current Lincoln Hall was built. In 1922 the dining hall (Lansing Hall) was built with additional dormitory rooms for high school girls. By 1926 nearly sixty acres of land were being farmed by the students. Student work (including cooking, serving meals, laundry and cleaning by the girls) helped supplement the students' tuition.

The Worthingtons offered basic instruction for grades 1–8 in addition to vocational training. Classes included agriculture, plumbing, auto mechanics, mechanical drawing, sheet-metal work, electrical plant operation, weaving, cooking, sewing, canning, and home nursing.

The settlement school finally closed in 1978.

== After 1978 ==
Its campus has been redeveloped and houses a number of non-profits. Jackson County Ministries was formed in 1979 and took over the management of the Annville Institute campus. In 2016 the name was changed to Grace Covenant Ministries.

The Annville Institute was badly damaged in a fire on July 30, 2025.

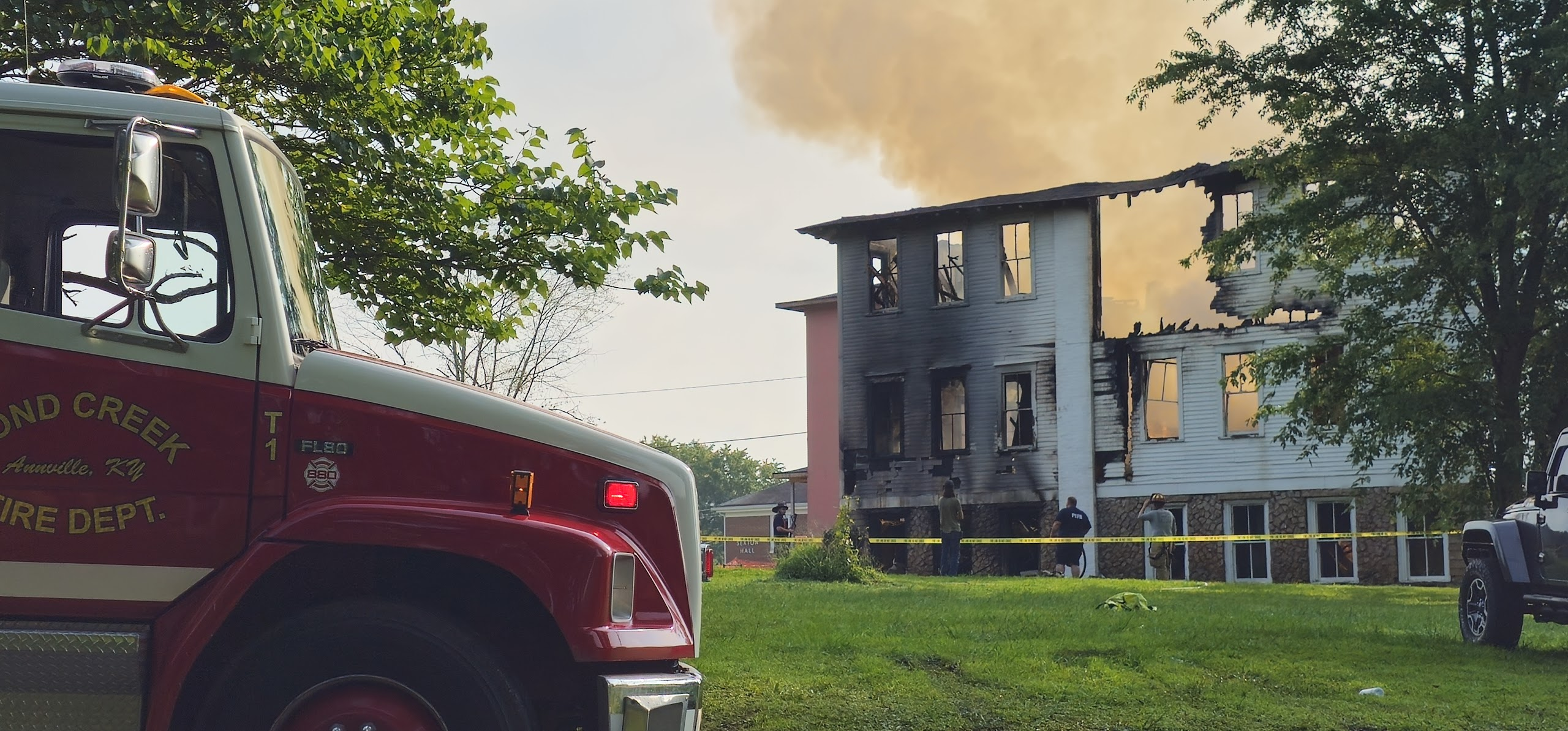
Annville Institute after fire

== See also ==
- Annville, Kentucky
- Reformed Church in America
- Settlement schools in Appalachia
