= Sheltowee Trace Trail =

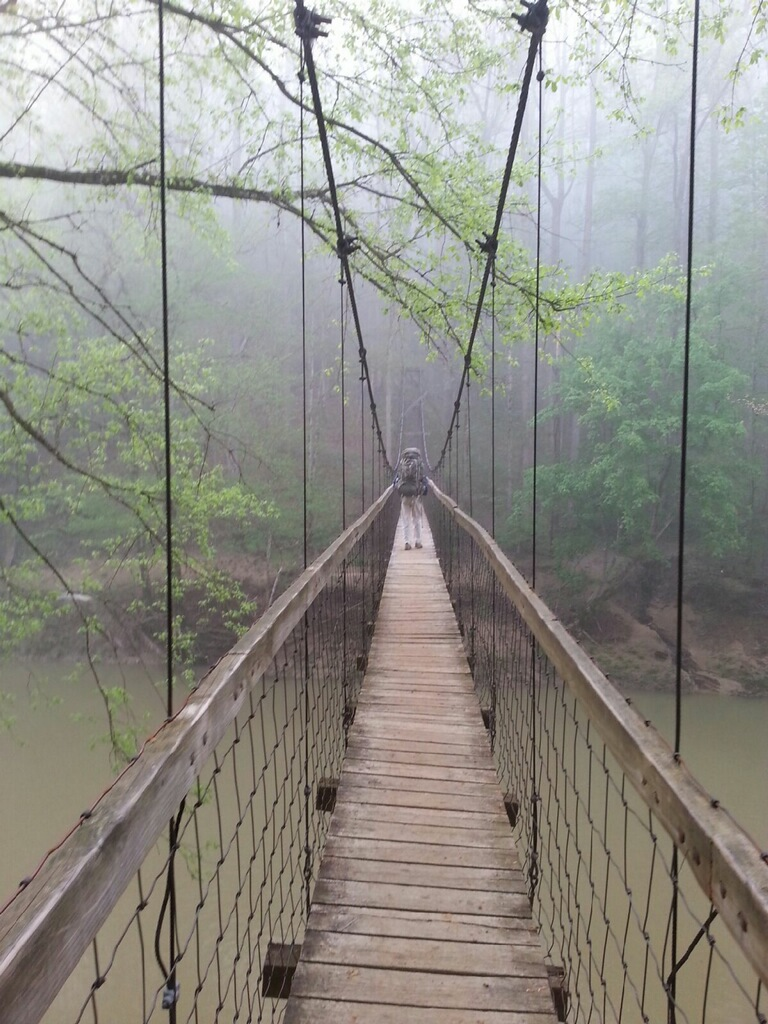
- Hiker crossing the Red River
- Length: 333 miles (535.91 km)
- Location: Kentucky and Tennessee
- Designation: National Recreation Trail
- Trailheads: Big South Fork National River and Recreation Area, Tennessee; Rowan County, Kentucky
- Use: Hiking
- Difficulty: Easy to strenuous
- Season: Year-round
- Hazards: Severe weather American black bear Tick-borne diseases Mosquitos; Yellowjackets; Biting flies Chiggers; Steep grades Limited water Diarrhea from water Poison ivy Venomous snakes

The Sheltowee Trace Trail is a 343-mile (552.00 km) National Recreation Trail that was created in 1979 and stretches from the Burnt Mill Bridge Trail Head in the Big South Fork National River and Recreation Area in Tennessee (36°23′14″N 84°37′47″W) to northern Rowan County, Kentucky (38°23′7″N 83°24′58″W). The trail is named after Daniel Boone, who was given the name Sheltowee (meaning "Big Turtle") when he was adopted as the son of the great warrior Chief Blackfish of the Shawnee tribe.

The trail is primarily in the Daniel Boone National Forest, but also takes visitors through the Big South Fork National River and Recreation Area, Cumberland Falls State Resort Park, Natural Bridge State Resort Park, two large recreation lakes (Cave Run Lake and Laurel Lake), and many wildlife management areas. All but the southernmost 45 miles (72.42 km) are in Kentucky.

The trail is multi-use, with certain designated sections allowing horses, mountain bikes and all-terrain vehicles. However, the use of off-road motorcycles, SUVs, 4x4, ATVs and even mountain bikes in certain areas can result in equipment confiscation and fines. While the southern terminus was moved in 2014, the trail into Pickett State Park remains open for those that wish to exit on that trail or wish to walk further down the scenic Rock Creek. The movement and addition of 10 miles of trail onto the Kentucky Trail in the Big South Fork in 2019 added 10 miles to the Trace's previous length of 323 miles.
