= Kenny Price =

American country singer-songwriter (1931–1987)

- Born: James Kenneth Price; May 27, 1931; Florence, Kentucky, U.S.
- Died: August 4, 1987 (aged 56) Florence, Kentucky, U.S.
- Genres: Country
- Occupation: Singer
- Instrument: Guitar
- Years active: 1964–1984
- Labels: Boone, RCA Victor, MRC, Dimension

James Kenneth Price (May 27, 1931 – August 4, 1987) was an American country music singer, songwriter, and actor. Nicknamed the "Round Mound of Sound," Price recorded for the Boone and RCA Victor, MRC and Dimension record labels, charting thirty-four singles on the Hot Country Songs charts between 1966 and 1980. His highest-peaking singles, "Walking on New Grass" and "Happy Tracks," both reached No. 7 on that chart.

== Life and career ==
Price was born in Florence, Kentucky, United States, and was raised on a farm in Boone County, Kentucky. He learned to play guitar when he was five years old. From 1952 until 1954, Price served in the U.S. Army during the Korean War, reaching the rank of corporal. While stationed in Korea, he auditioned for a USO show, and before being discharged, he had decided to become a professional musician. He studied for a brief time at the Cincinnati College-Conservatory of Music and became a musician on Midwestern Hayride on WLWT, eventually taking over as the show's host until it went off the air in September 1972.

He first recorded for Boone Records, then moved on to RCA Records in 1969, where he stayed until 1976. For most of his career, Price worked with Ray Pennington, whose style complemented his own. Price had 34 singles chart in his career, including "Walking on the New Grass" (a top 10 hit in 1966), "Happy Tracks", "Northeast Arkansas Mississippi County Bootlegger" (a top 20 hit in 1969),. and "The Sheriff of Boone County" (which hit the Country top 10). A 1970 novelty song he co-wrote with his producer Ronny Light, a B-side single called "The Shortest Song in the World"- which clocked in at a mere eighteen seconds long, enjoyed some airplay in 1970.

Standing 6'-6" tall and weighing nearly 300 lb (140 kg) for most of his professional career, he was nicknamed "The Round Mound of Sound", and wrote a song by the same name in 1968. Many of his comedic songs made reference to his size — "The Heavyweight" is an obvious example. In later years, Price became significantly thinner and lampooned himself in the song "The Boone County Weight Watchers of America".

In 1975, Price relocated to Nashville, and after a few uncredited appearances became a regular on Hee Haw. He remained with the show until his death. He served as the bass vocalist for the Hee Haw Gospel Quartet, which included Grandpa Jones, Buck Owens, and Roy Clark. Price and fellow Hee Haw cast member Lulu Roman got their own short-lived spin-off series called Hee Haw Honeys, which ran from 1978 to 1979. Price and Roman guest starred on two episodes of The Love Boat. He later had a small role in the film Cold Justice, which was released after his death.

His wife, Donna Price, wrote a few memorable tunes for him, including the hit "Let's Truck Together", which was used in a late 70s Hee Haw skit. In the mid-1980s, Kenny and Donna starred in The Nashville Network (now Paramount Network) travelogue series called Wish You Were Here, where they traveled across the United States in a RV and visited places of interest.

Price died of a heart attack in Florence, Kentucky, at the age of 56.

== Discography ==
=== Albums ===
Year	Album	US Country	Label
1967	One Hit Follows Another	36	Boone
1968	Southern Bound	23	Boone
1970	Heavyweight	—	RCA Victor
1970	Northeast Arkansas Mississippi County Bootlegger	—	RCA Victor
1971	A Red Foley Songbook	—	RCA Victor
1971	The Sheriff of Boone County	42	RCA Victor
1971	Charlotte Fever	39	RCA Victor
1972	Super Sideman	—	RCA Victor
1972	You Almost Slipped My Mind	37	RCA Victor
1973	Sea of Heartbreak	—	RCA Victor
1973	30 California Women	—	RCA Victor
1974	Turn On Your Light and Let It Shine	—	RCA Victor
1977	Heavy Duty Country	—	MRC
1980	The Best of Both	—	Dimension

=== Singles ===
Year	Single	Chart Positions		Album
Year	Single	US Country	CAN Country	Album
1964	"Low and Lonely"	—	—	singles only
1965	"White Silver Sands"	—	—	singles only
1965	"That's All That Matters"	—	—	One Hit Follows Another
1965	"Hunky Dory"	—	—	One Hit Follows Another
1966	"Walking On New Grass"	7	—	One Hit Follows Another
1967	"Happy Tracks"	7	—	One Hit Follows Another
1967	"Pretty Girl, Pretty Clothes, Pretty Sad"	26	—	single only
1967	"Grass Won't Grow On a Busy Street"	24	—	Southern Bound
1968	"My Goal for Today"	11	—	Southern Bound
1968	"Going Home for the Last Time"	31	—	Southern Bound
1968	"Southern Bound"	37	—	Southern Bound
1968	"It Don't Mean a Thing to Me"	59	—	Southern Bound
1969	"Who Do I Know in Dallas"	64	—	Heavyweight
1969	"Atlanta Georgia Stray"	62	—	Heavyweight
1970	"Northeast Arkansas Mississippi County Bootlegger"	17	6	Northeast Arkansas Mississippi County Bootlegger
1970	"Biloxi"	10	19	The Sheriff of Boone County
1971	"The Sheriff of Boone County"^{A}	8	9	The Sheriff of Boone County
1971	"Tell Her You Love Her"	55	—	The Sheriff of Boone County
1971	"Charlotte Fever"	38	—	Charlotte Fever
1972	"Super Sideman"	37	31	Charlotte Fever
1972	"You Almost Slipped My Mind"	44	—	You Almost Slipped My Mind
1972	"Sea of Heartbreak"	24	13	Sea of Heartbreak
1973	"Don't Tell Me Your Troubles"	53	63	Sea of Heartbreak
1973	"30 California Women"	52	56	30 California Women
1973	"You're Wearin' Me Down"	52	—	single only
1974	"Turn On Your Light (And Let It Shine)"	29	40	Turn On Your Light and Let It Shine
1974	"Que Pasa"	69	—	Turn On Your Light and Let It Shine
1974	"Let's Truck Together"	42	—	Heavy Duty Country
1975	"Easy Look"	67	—	singles only
1975	"Birds and Children Fly Away"	65	—	singles only
1975	"I've Changed Since I've Been Unchained"	—	—	singles only
1976	"Too Big a Price to Pay"	60	—	singles only
1977	"I'd Buy You Chattanooga"	60	—	Heavy Duty Country
1977	"Leavin'"	74	—	Heavy Duty Country
1978	"Afraid You'd Come Back"	50	—	singles only
1978	"Sunshine Man"	74	—	singles only
1978	"Daddy's Hands"	—	—	singles only
1979	"Hey There"	67	—	The Best of Both
1980	"Well Rounded Traveling Man"	60	—	The Best of Both
1980	"She's Leavin' (And I'm Almost Gone)"	79	—	The Best of Both
1984	"If I Just Had You"	—	—	singles only
1984	"Pete Pete"	—	—	singles only

- ^{A}"The Sheriff of Boone County" also peaked at No. 19 on Bubbling Under Hot 100.
