= Annville, Kentucky =

Census-designated place in Kentucky, United States

- Census-designated place
- Location within Kentucky Location within the United States
- Coordinates: 37°19′9″N 83°57′45″W
- Country: United States
- State: Kentucky
- County: Jackson
- Established: 1878

Area
  - Total: 8.05 sq mi (20.85 km^{2})
  - Land: 8.00 sq mi (20.73 km^{2})
  - Water: 0.042 sq mi (0.11 km^{2})
- Elevation: 1,102 ft (336 m)

Population (2020)
  - Total: 1,102
  - Density: 137.7/sq mi (53.15/km^{2})
- Time zone: Eastern (EST)
- ZIP code: 40402
- Area code: 606
- FIPS code: 21-01648
- GNIS feature ID
- Website: www.annvilleky.com

Annville is an unincorporated community, a census-designated place (CDP), and the largest community in Jackson County, Kentucky, United States. As of the 2020 census, the population was 1,102. The community was established in 1878 and named for local resident Nancy Ann Johnson. The community offers a few services such as a post office, grocery store, gas station, medical clinic, nursing home, restaurants, and other locally owned businesses.

== Geography and transportation ==
Annville is located in southern Jackson County, along KY Route 3630.

According to the United States Census Bureau, the Annville CDP has a total area of 8.0 square miles, of which 0.4 square miles, or 0.55%, are water. Pond Creek flows through the southern part of the community, running southwest to the South Fork of the Rockcastle River, part of the Cumberland River watershed.

=== Public parks ===
- Worthington Park

=== Major routes ===
- KY Route 3630
- KY Route 30
- KY Route 290

Kentucky Route 3630 is the main road through the community. Kentucky Route 290 goes north from town 9 miles to McKee, the county's seat. South of community is Kentucky Route 30 which bypasses the community as a recently constructed highway and acts as the county's main east–west corridor, connecting the community to London, 15 miles to the southwest.

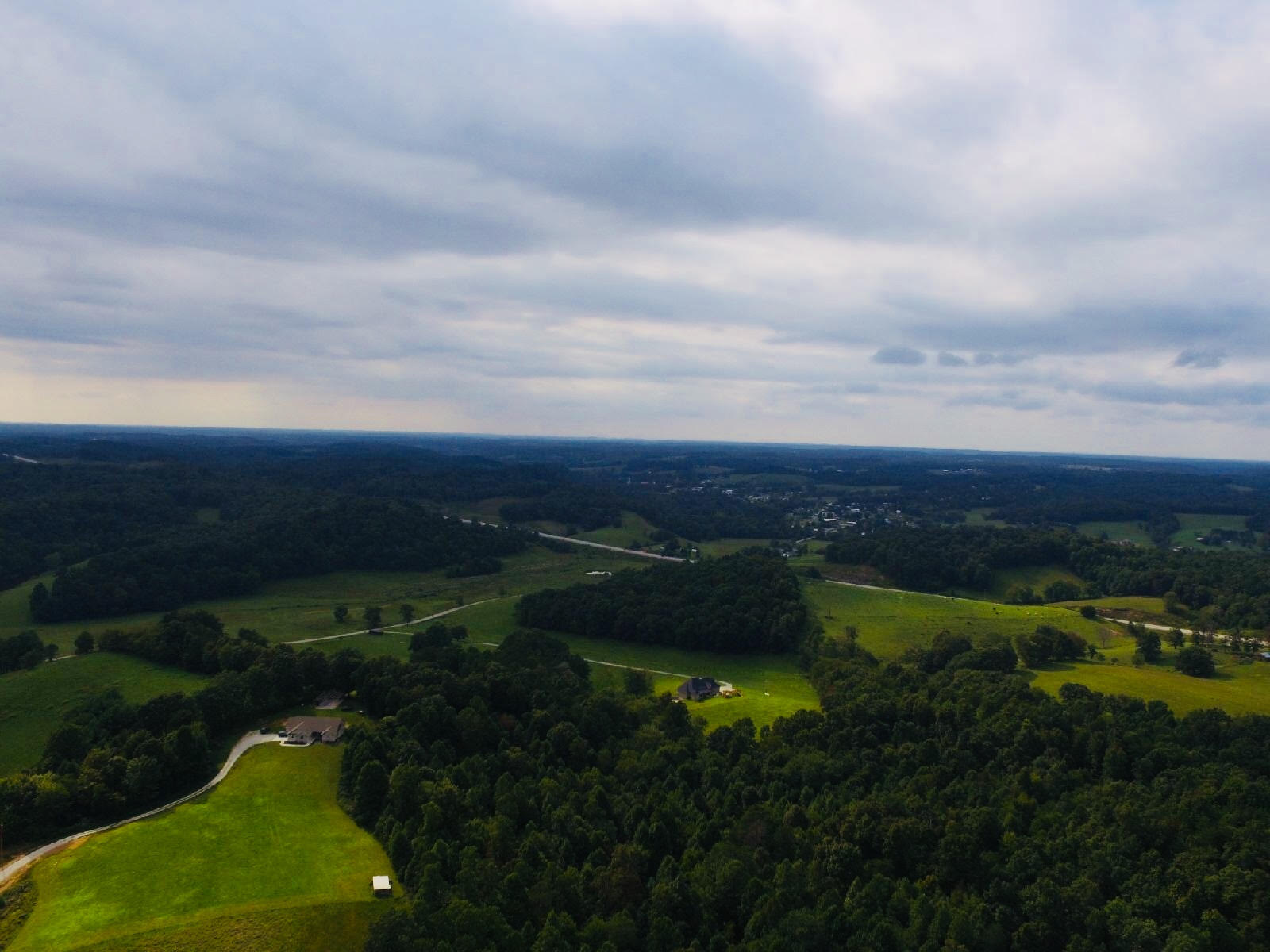
Aerial image of town looking northwest

== History ==
=== Establishment ===
The town's first post office was opened in 1878, named Chinquapin Rough, for the numerous chinquapin and dwarf chestnut trees found along Pond Creek. In 1886, the post office was renamed Annville for resident Nancy Ann Johnson. Annville was incorporated in 1988 and dissolved in 2000.

=== Annville Institute ===
In 1900 the Women's Board of Domestic Missions (WBDM) of the Reformed Church in America (RCA) established missions in Jackson County, Kentucky. Mrs. Cora A. Smith, a Bible teacher and nurse, and Miss Nora Gaut, a teacher, came to Kentucky and started a day school in McKee. In 1905 Rev. Isaac Messler and his wife were sent by the RCA to McKee and they started RCA religious services and Sunday Schools at Smith, Salt Lick, Middle Fork, Gray Hawk, and Adkins. In 1909 Rev. Messler was given funds by the WBDM to purchase a 75-acre farm at Pond Creek near Annville, and he started building a schoolhouse there to start a new settlement school. That winter a newly ordained RCA minister Rev. William Worthington married the widow Mrs. Henrietta Zwemer Te Kolste, the principal at RCA's McKee Academy, and together they built a school of "complete living for the mountain people."

The Annville Institute started that Fall and has served the community in multiple facets ever since. Although the Annville Institute no longer operates as a school, it still benefits the community through its numerous outreach program and facilities.

==== Lincoln Hall ====
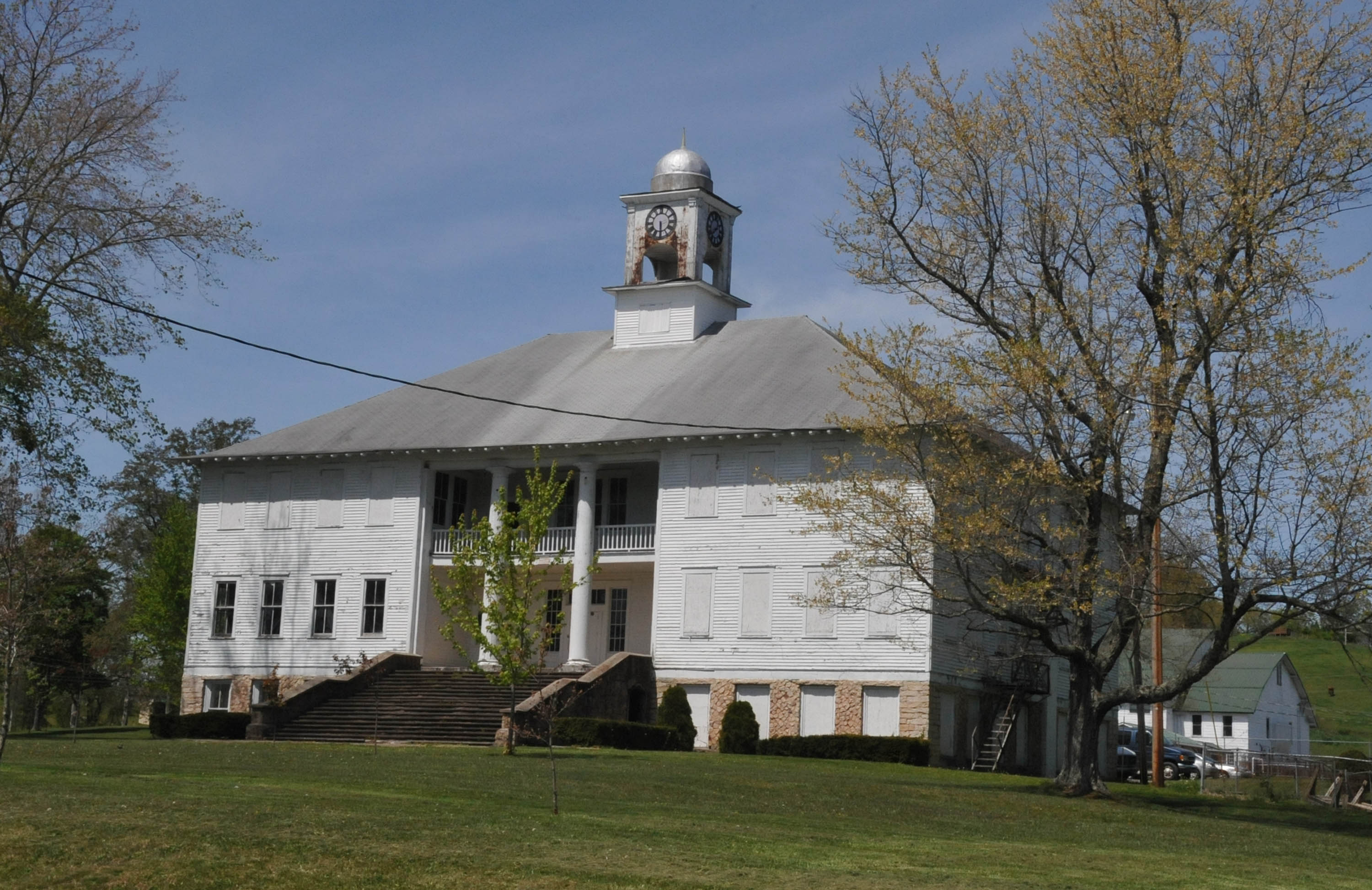
Lincoln Hall at the campus of Annville Institute

Lincoln Hall served as the main classroom for the Annville Institute. The original Lincoln Hall was destroyed by fire in 1921. The present building was built in 1922 and 1923 on the foundation of the original building. After the Institute ceased its educational operations in 1978, the building has primarily served as a community center, with no true purpose.

== Economy ==
The Jackson County Industrial Development Authority (JCIDA) assists with economic development efforts in the county. The authority manages three industrial parks in the county, including the Jackson County Regional Industrial Park, which is located in Annville. Major employers in Annville include:

- Bear Precision Coatings
- DTS Industries
- JC Tech Industries
- Phillips Diversified Manufacturing
- Senture
- Teleworks USA

== Education ==
Annville is served by the Jackson County Public School system.

Schools that serve the community include:

- Tyner Elementary School (K–5)
- Jackson County Middle School (6–8)
- Jackson County High School (9–12)
- Annville Christian Academy (K–12, private)

== Demographics ==
Historical population
Census	Pop.	Note	%±
1980	371		—
1990	470		26.7%
2000	589		25.3%
2010	1,095		85.9%
2020	1,102		0.6%
U.S. Census Bureau

As of the 2020 census, there were 1,102 people residing in the community. The racial makeup of the city was 97.47% White, 0.24% Hispanic or Latino, 1.93% two or more races, and 0.60% Black or African American.

The median income for a household in the city was $37,957. About 26.32% of the population were below the poverty line.

The mean cost for a housing unit was $100,100 while the average rent was $664.
