= McKee, Kentucky =

- City
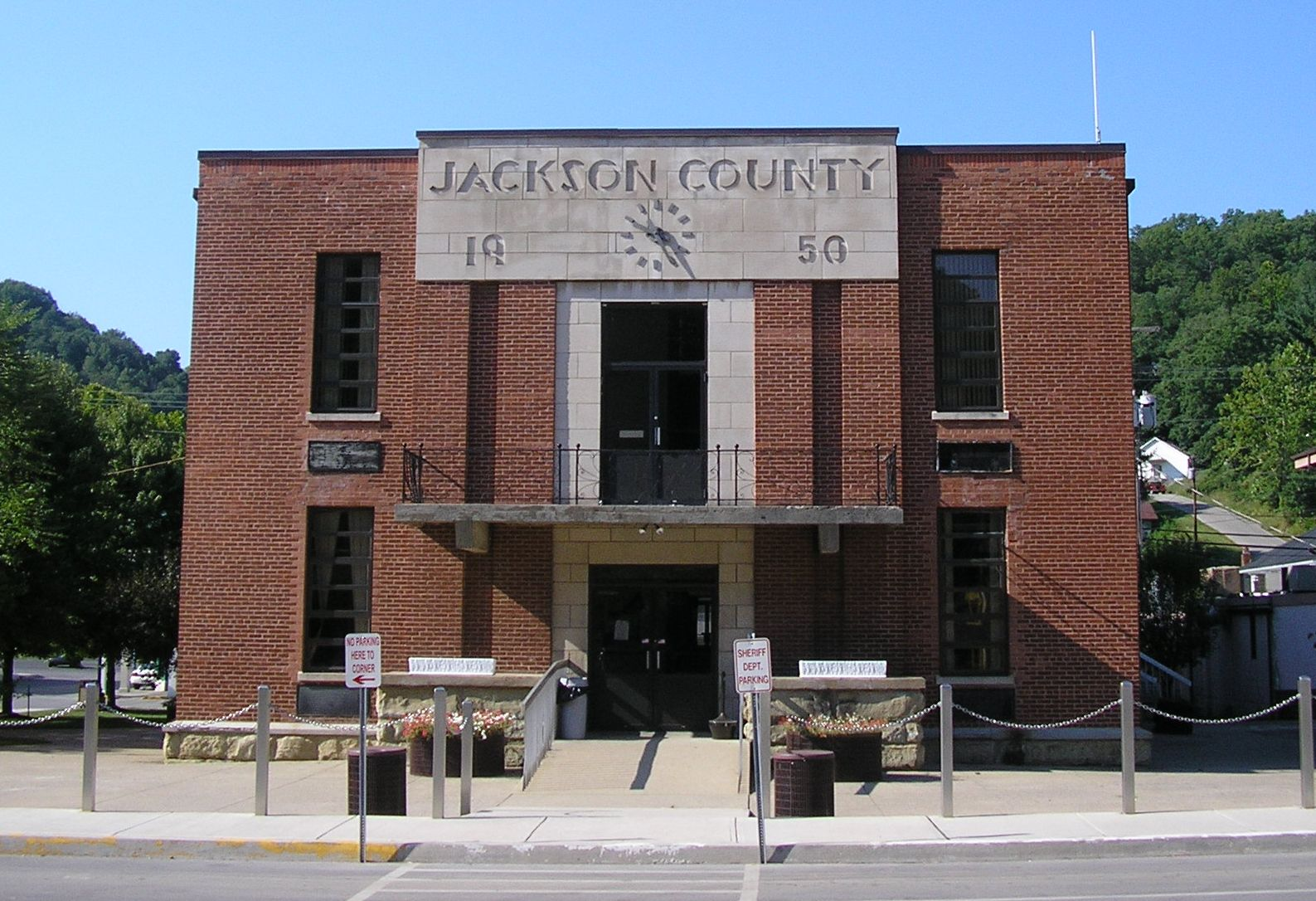
- Jackson County Courthouse in McKee
- Motto(s): Where the Mountains and the Bluegrass Blend
- Location of McKee in Jackson County, Kentucky
- Coordinates: 37°25′49″N 83°59′37″W
- Country: United States
- State: Kentucky
- County: Jackson
- Incorporated: April 1, 1882
- Named for: Judge George R. McKee

Government
  - Type: Mayor-Council
  - Mayor: Michael Stidham

Area
  - Total: 2.41 sq mi (6.23 km^{2})
  - Land: 2.41 sq mi (6.23 km^{2})
  - Water: 0 sq mi (0.00 km^{2})
- Elevation: 1,030 ft (314 m)

Population (2020)
  - Total: 803 ▲
  - Density: 333.7/sq mi (128.85/km^{2})
- Time zone: UTC-5 (Eastern (EST))
  - Summer (DST): UTC-4 (EDT)
- ZIP code: 40447
- Area code: 606
- FIPS code: 21-49116
- GNIS feature ID: 0513872

McKee is a home rule-class city in Jackson County, Kentucky, United States. It is the county seat and only city in the county. As of the 2020 census, the population of the city was 803.

== History ==
The city was founded on April 1, 1882, and was named for Judge George R. McKee. In 2019, the city held a vote regarding the sale of alcohol, which passed, making the city wet.

== Geography ==
McKee is located in the central part of Jackson County, within the Daniel Boone National Forest. U.S. Route 421 passes through the center of town, leading northwest 34 miles to Richmond and southeast 29 miles to Manchester. Kentucky Route 89 runs north from McKee 28 miles to Irvine and southwest 24 miles to Livingston, while Kentucky Route 290 leads south from McKee 9 miles to Annville.

According to the United States Census Bureau, the city has a total area of 2.33 square miles, of which 0.3 acres or 0.02%, are water. The city sits in the valley of Pigeon Roost Creek, which joins Birch Lick Creek at the western end of the city to form Indian Creek, a southwest-flowing tributary of the Middle Fork of the Rockcastle River, part of the Cumberland River watershed.

== Demographics ==
Historical population
Census	Pop.	Note	%±
1880	88		—
1900	106		—
1910	146		37.7%
1920	173		18.5%
1930	190		9.8%
1960	234		—
1970	255		9.0%
1980	759		197.6%
1990	870		14.6%
2000	878		0.9%
2010	800		−8.9%
2020	803		0.4%
2021 (est.)	803		0.0%
U.S. Decennial Census

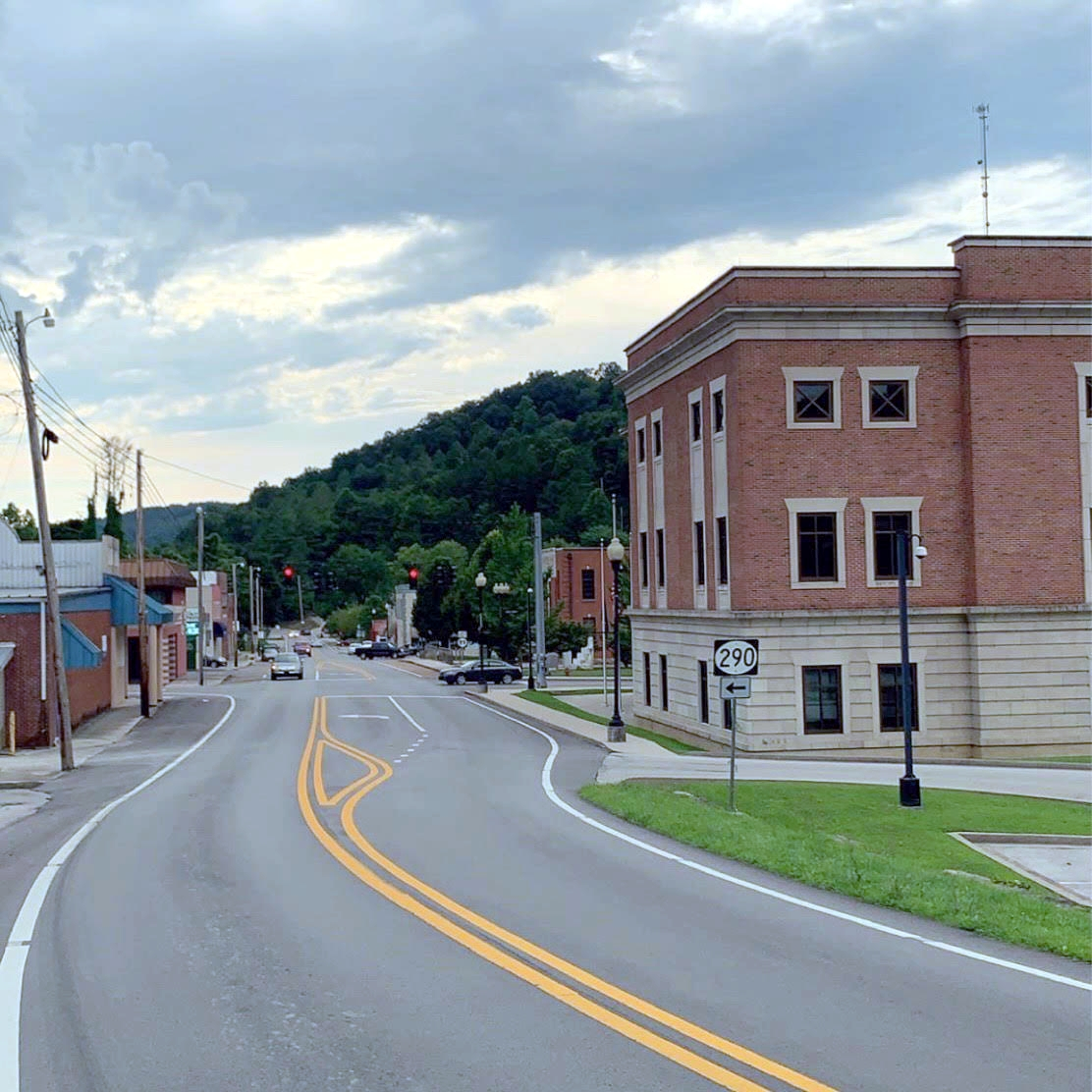
Main Street in downtown McKee

As of the 2020 census, there were 803 people residing in the town. The racial makeup of the city was 97.65% White, 1.03% Black or African American, and 1.31% from two or more races. Hispanic or Latino of any race were 0.85% of the population. The median age of residents was 40.9 years.

The median income for a household in the town was $20,061, and the median income for a family was $21,289. About 40% of the population were below the poverty line.

The median rental price in the city was $338 a month and the median house value was $107,000.

== Economy ==
The Jackson County - McKee Industrial Development Authority assists with economic development efforts in the county. The authority manages several industrial parks within Jackson County, one of which is located in McKee.

== Arts and culture ==
A branch of the Jackson County Public Library is located in McKee.

Annual events include:

- Jackson County Fair and Homecoming, featuring 4-H craft exhibits, music entertainment, clogging, vendors, food trucks, and a parade.
- Sheltowee Trace Artisans Fair, a craft sale.

== Parks and recreation ==
Public parks include Bond Memorial Park, Jackson County Veterans Park, McKee City Park, and Jack Gabbard Park.

Other recreation areas include McKee Reservoir, Big Turtle Trail, Daniel Boone National Forest, and Mill Creek Wildlife Management Area.

== Education ==
=== History ===
In 1900, the Woman's Board of Domestic Missions of the Reformed Church in America (RCA) established a day school called the McKee Academy. They soon established a girls' dormitory nearby to accommodate students living too far away. A teachers' cottage accommodated the growing staff that by 1908 offered high school courses. The RCA also offered a "trading house" where locals could purchase used clothing and household furnishings. This was Kentucky's first settlement school, a notable event usually associated with the Hindman Settlement School in Knott County, Kentucky. The RCA opened a new school in nearby Annville, establishing the Annville Institute. Lincoln Hall school building on that campus opened in 1910.

=== Public education ===
The city is served by the Jackson County Public School system. The following schools operate within the city:

- McKee Elementary School
- Jackson County Middle School
- Jackson County High School
- Jackson County Area Technology Center

== Infrastructure ==
=== Utilities ===
Power in McKee is served by Jackson Energy, which is headquartered in the city and serves Jackson County and surrounding counties such as Lee County, Owsley County, Clay County, Laurel County, Rockcastle County, and Madison County. Cable TV, internet, and phone in McKee is served by Peoples Rural Telephone Cooperative, which is also headquartered in the city and serves Jackson County, Owsley County, and Clay County. Every home and business in McKee is wired with fiber-optic cable. McKee Water and Sewer also serves residents in the city.

=== Healthcare ===
Emergency medical services for McKee are provided by the Jackson County Ambulance Service.
