= List of Kentucky supplemental roads and rural secondary highways (700–799) =

Kentucky supplemental roads and rural secondary highways (700–799)
- Highway markers for KY 700 and KY 799

Highway names
- Interstates: Interstate nn (I-nn)
- US Highways: U.S. Highway nn (US nn)
- State: KY nn

System links
- Kentucky State Highway System; Interstate; US; State; Parkways
- Supplemental/Rural Secondary; 1–199; 200–299; 300–399; 400–499; 500–599; 600–699; 700–799; 800–899; 900–999; 1000–1499; 1500–1999; 2000–2499; 2500–2999; 3000–3499; 3500–6999

Kentucky supplemental roads and rural secondary highways are the lesser two of the four functional classes of highways constructed and maintained by the Kentucky Transportation Cabinet, the state-level agency that constructs and maintains highways in Kentucky. The agency splits its inventory of state highway mileage into four categories:

- The State Primary System includes Interstate Highways, Parkways, and other long-distance highways of statewide importance that connect the state's major cities, including much of the courses of Kentucky's U.S. Highways.
- The State Secondary System includes highways of regional importance that connect the state's smaller urban centers, including those county seats not served by the state primary system.
- The Rural Secondary System includes highways of local importance, such as farm-to-market roads and urban collectors.
- Supplemental Roads are the set of highways not in the first three systems, including frontage roads, bypassed portions of other state highways, and rural roads that only serve their immediate area.

The same-numbered highway can comprise sections of road under different categories. This list contains descriptions of Supplemental Roads and highways in the Rural Secondary System numbered 700 to 799 that do not have portions within the State Primary and State Secondary systems.

== Kentucky Route 700 ==
Kentucky Route 700
- Location: Big South Fork National River and Recreation Area-near Honeybee
- Length: 16.539 mi (26.617 km)

Kentucky Route 700 is a 16.539-mile-long (26.617 km) rural secondary state highway in central McCreary County that runs from a boat ramp along the Big South Fork of the Cumberland River in the northern portion of the Big South Fork National River and Recreation Area to Kentucky Route 90 south of Honeybee via Marshes Siding.

Major intersections

The entire route is in McCreary County.

Location	mi	km	Destinations	Notes
Big South Fork National River and Recreation Area	0.000	0.000	Boat ramp	Western terminus
Marshes Siding	4.972	8.002	KY 1651	
	5.487	8.830	US 27	
	7.328	11.793	KY 3253 west (Jennys Branch Road)	Eastern terminus of KY 3253
	16.410	26.409	KY 1045 west (Beulah Heights Road)	Eastern terminus of KY 1045
	16.539	26.617	KY 90 (Cumberland Falls Road)	Eastern terminus
1.000 mi = 1.609 km; 1.000 km = 0.621 mi

== Kentucky Route 701 ==
Kentucky Route 701
- Location: near Smith Town-Whitley City
- Length: 1.006 mi (1.619 km)

Kentucky Route 701 (KY 701) is a 1.006-mile-long (1.619 km) rural secondary state highway in central McCreary County that runs from Kentucky Route 92 east of Smith Town to Kentucky Route 1651 southwest of Whitley City.

=== History ===
KY 701 was formed by 1977 when KY 478 was truncated to KY 1651.

The original KY 701 ran from US 68 near Smiths Grove to KY 1297 in Hydro; this was removed by 1976 and is now Hydro Pondsville Road.

== Kentucky Route 702 ==
Kentucky Route 702
- Location: near Little Sandy
- Length: 2.855 mi (4.595 km)

Kentucky Route 702 (KY 702) is a 2.855-mile-long (4.595 km) supplemental state highway in southwestern Elliott County that runs from a point along Neal Howard Creek Road southwest of Little Sandy to Kentucky Route 7 at Little Sandy.

=== History ===
KY 702 was formed in the late 1970s as a renumbering of the original KY 705.

The original KY 702 ran from KY 108 west to Glen Dean; this became part of rerouted KY 108 when KY 105 was rerouted on its current route; the old route of KY 108 east to KY 79 became part of KY 105.

== Kentucky Route 703 ==
Kentucky Route 703
- Location: Clinton-near Nichols
- Length: 8.396 mi (13.512 km)

Kentucky Route 703 (KY 703) is a 8.396-mile-long (13.512 km) state highway in central Hickman County that runs from U.S. Route 51 in northern Clinton to Kentucky Route 307 and O'Neal Road north of Nichols.

=== History ===
KY 703 was formed ca. 1968.

The original KY 703 ran from KY 477 in Webster to KY 448 (now KY 79) in Midway; this became part of KY 261 when it was extended northeast ca. 1965.

=== Major intersections ===
The entire route is in Hickman County.

Location	mi	km	Destinations	Notes
Clinton	0.000	0.000	US 51 (North Washington Street)	Western terminus
Clinton	0.065	0.105	North Waterfield Drive Street (KY 1731 south)	Northern terminus of KY 1731
	0.828	1.333	KY 2206 north	Southern terminus of KY 2206
	3.994	6.428	KY 1362 north	Southern terminus of KY 1362
	5.669	9.123	KY 288 west / Binford Road	Eastern terminus of KY 288
	8.396	13.512	KY 307 / O'Neal Road	Eastern terminus; continues as O'Neal Road beyond KY 307
1.000 mi = 1.609 km; 1.000 km = 0.621 mi

== Kentucky Route 704 ==
Kentucky Route 704
- Location: near Burkesville-near Columbia
- Length: 24.176 mi (38.908 km)

Kentucky Route 704 (KY 704) is a 24.176-mile-long (38.908 km) rural secondary state highway in northeastern Cumberland County and southern Adair County that runs from Kentucky Route 61 north of Burkesville to Kentucky Route 55 south of Columbia via Amandaville and Fairplay.

=== Major intersections ===
County	Location	mi	km	Destinations	Notes
Cumberland		0.000	0.000	KY 61 (Columbia Road) – Burkesville, Columbia	Southern terminus
Cumberland		2.306	3.711	KY 912 east (Bakerton Road)	Western terminus of KY 912
Adair		18.360	29.548	KY 768 west	South end of KY 768 overlap
Adair	Fairplay	19.190	30.883	KY 768 east (Glens Fork Road)	North end of KY 768 overlap
Adair		24.176	38.908	KY 55	Northern terminus
1.000 mi = 1.609 km; 1.000 km = 0.621 mi: Concurrency terminus

== Kentucky Route 705 ==
Kentucky Route 705
- Location: Salem-near Bonny
- Length: 24.176 mi (38.908 km)

Kentucky Route 705 (KY 705) is a 24.176-mile-long (38.908 km) rural secondary state highway in southwestern Morgan County that runs from Kentucky Route 844 at Salem to Kentucky Route 772 northwest of Bonny via Nickell, Grassy Creek, and Woodsbend.

=== History ===
KY 705 was formed in 1980.

The original KY 705 was in Elliott County, running from KY 7 southwest, east, and northeast to KY 7. A portion was transferred to KY 650 by 1968, and sections were turned back; the remaining section was renumbered KY 702 by 1977.

=== Major intersections ===
The entire route is in Morgan County.

Location	mi	km	Destinations	Notes
Salem	0.000	0.000	KY 844 (Buskirk-Stacy Fork Road / Salem Church Road)	Southern terminus
	2.269	3.652	KY 205	
Grassy Creek	4.752	7.648	US 460	
	7.593	12.220	KY 3345 west (Lower Long Branch Road)	Eastern terminus of KY 3345
	13.883	22.343	KY 772	Northern terminus
1.000 mi = 1.609 km; 1.000 km = 0.621 mi

== Kentucky Route 706 ==
Kentucky Route 706
- Location: Crockett-near Green
- Length: 15.087 mi (24.280 km)

Kentucky Route 706 (KY 706) is a 15.087-mile-long (24.280 km) rural secondary state highway in northeastern Morgan County and southern Elliott County that runs from Kentucky Route 172 in Crockett to Kentucky Route 7 northeast of Green via Eldridge, and Isonville.

=== Major intersections ===
County	Location	mi	km	Destinations	Notes
Morgan	Crockett	0.000	0.000	KY 172	Southern terminus
Elliott	Isonville	6.884	11.079	KY 32 west	South end of KY 32 overlap
Elliott	Isonville	7.000	11.265	KY 32 east	North end of KY 32 overlap
Elliott		15.087	24.280	KY 7	Northern terminus
1.000 mi = 1.609 km; 1.000 km = 0.621 mi: Concurrency terminus

== Kentucky Route 707 ==
Kentucky Route 707
- Location: near Fallsburg-Buchanan
- Length: 9.757 mi (15.702 km)

Kentucky Route 707 (KY 707) is a 9.757-mile-long (15.702 km) rural secondary state highway in northeastern Lawrence County that runs from Kentucky Route 3 northwest of Fallsburg to U.S. Route 23 at Buchanan.

=== Major intersections ===
The entire route is in Lawrence County.

Location	mi	km	Destinations	Notes
	0.000	0.000	KY 3	Southern terminus
	3.820	6.148	KY 3399 north	Southern terminus of KY 3399
	8.160	13.132	KY 1937 north	Southern terminus of KY 1937
Buchanan	9.757	15.702	US 23 (Louisa Road)	Northern terminus
1.000 mi = 1.609 km; 1.000 km = 0.621 mi

== Kentucky Route 708 ==
Kentucky Route 708
- Location: Lerose-near Fillmore
- Length: 13.024 mi (20.960 km)

Kentucky Route 708 (KY 708) is a 13.024-mile-long (20.960 km) rural secondary state highway in northeastern Owsley County and eastern Lee County that runs from Kentucky Route 30 in Lerose to Spencer Bend Road on the Breathitt County line northeast of Fillmore via Lone, Tallega, Canyon Falls, and Fillmore.

=== Major intersections ===
County	Location	mi	km	Destinations	Notes
Owsley	Lerose	0.000	0.000	KY 30	Southern terminus
Owsley		0.242	0.389	KY 1717 east	Western terminus of KY 1717
Lee	Tallega	6.282	10.110	KY 52 east / C Drake Road	South end of KY 52 overlap
Lee		8.117	13.063	KY 52 west	North end of KY 52 overlap
Lee		11.371	18.300	KY 2017 west	Eastern terminus of KY 2017
Lee–Breathitt county line		13.024	20.960	Spencer Bend Road	Northern terminus; continues as Spencer Bend Road beyond county line
1.000 mi = 1.609 km; 1.000 km = 0.621 mi: Concurrency terminus

== Kentucky Route 711 ==
Kentucky Route 711
- Location: near Redwine-near Wyett
- Length: 13.984 mi (22.505 km)

Kentucky Route 711 (KY 711) is a 13.984-mile-long (22.505 km) rural secondary highway in northeastern Morgan County and northwestern Elliott County that runs from Redwine Road and Clevitt Branch Road east of Redwine to Kentucky Route 173 on the Rowan County line northwest of Wyett via Redwine, Wrigley, Leisure, Oak Hill, and Blairs Mills.

=== Major intersections ===
County	Location	mi	km	Destinations	Notes
Morgan		0.000	0.000	Redwine Road / Clevitt Branch Road	Southern terminus; continues as Clevitt Branch Road beyond Redwine Road
Morgan	Wrigley	2.914	4.690	KY 7	
Morgan		4.800	7.725	KY 3240 west (Blaze Road)	Eastern terminus of KY 3240
Elliott–Rowan county line		13.984	22.505	KY 173	Northern terminus
1.000 mi = 1.609 km; 1.000 km = 0.621 mi

== Kentucky Route 712 ==
Kentucky Route 712
- Location: LaGrange-Jericho
- Length: 4.998 mi (8.044 km)

Kentucky Route 712 (KY 712) is a 4.998-mile-long (8.044 km) rural secondary state highway in eastern Oldham County and western Henry County that runs from Kentucky Route 146 in northeastern LaGrange to Kentucky Route 153 in northern Jericho via Tarascon.

=== Major intersections ===
County	Location	mi	km	Destinations	Notes
Oldham	LaGrange	0.000	0.000	KY 146 (East Jefferson Street)	Western terminus
Oldham	LaGrange	0.228	0.367	KY 2853 west (Jericho Road)	Eastern terminus of KY 2853
Henry		4.061	6.536	KY 3320 north (Mt. Olivet Road)	Southern terminus of KY 3320
Henry	Jericho	4.998	8.044	KY 153 (Lake Jericho Road)	Eastern terminus
1.000 mi = 1.609 km; 1.000 km = 0.621 mi

== Kentucky Route 714 ==
Kentucky Route 714
- Location: Southville–near Clay Village
- Length: 8.733 mi (14.054 km)

Kentucky Route 714 is a 8.733-mile-long (14.054 km) rural secondary highway in southeastern Shelby County. The highway begins at a four-legged intersection in the village of Southville. KY 44 heads south along Mount Eden Road and west along Southville Pike, KY 53 heads north along Mount Eden Road, and KY 714 heads east along Hempridge Road. KY 714 meets the eastern end of KY 2866 (Woodlawn Road) and curves north to Hemp Ridge, where the route crosses a tributary of Guist Creek and an R.J. Corman Railroad Group line. The highway crosses over I-64 with no access and meets the eastern end of KY 1790 (Hooper Station Road) near Hooper before reaching its northern terminus at US 60 (Frankfort Road) south of Guist Creek Lake and west of Clay Village.

=== Major intersections ===
The entire route is in Shelby County.

Location	mi	km	Destinations	Notes
Southville	0.000	0.000	KY 44 (Southville Pike) / KY 53 (Mount Eden Road)	Southern terminus
	3.768	6.064	KY 2866 west (Woodlawn Road)	Eastern terminus of KY 2866
	7.306	11.758	KY 1790 west (Hooper Station Road)	Eastern terminus of KY 1790
	8.733	14.054	US 60 (Frankfort Road)	Northern terminus
1.000 mi = 1.609 km; 1.000 km = 0.621 mi

== Kentucky Route 718 ==
Kentucky Route 718
- Location: Dewitt-near Erose
- Length: 10.813 mi (17.402 km)

Kentucky Route 718 is a 10.813-mile-long (17.402 km) rural secondary state highway in eastern Knox County that runs from Kentucky Route 223 and Walker Road at Dewitt to Paint Gap Branch Road and Pigeon Fork Road northeast of Erose via Walker and Erose.

=== Major intersections ===
The entire route is in Knox County.

Location	mi	km	Destinations	Notes
Dewitt	0.000	0.000	KY 223 (Stinking Creek Road) / Walker Road	Southern terminus
	2.036	3.277	KY 223 south (Stinking Creek Road)	Northern terminus of KY 223
	10.813	17.402	Paint Gap Branch Road / Pigeon Fork Road	Northern terminus
1.000 mi = 1.609 km; 1.000 km = 0.621 mi

== Kentucky Route 719 ==
Kentucky Route 719
- Location: near Elkfork-Fannin
- Length: 6.591 mi (10.607 km)

Kentucky Route 719 is a 6.591-mile-long (10.607 km) rural secondary state highway in southern Elliott County that runs from Laurel Fork Road at the Morgan County line north of Elkfork to Kentucky Route 32 at Fannin.

=== Major intersections ===
The entire route is in Elliott County.

Location	mi	km	Destinations	Notes
Morgan County line	0.000	0.000	Laurel Fork Road	Southern terminus; continues as Laurel Fork Road beyond county line
	5.271	8.483	KY 1208 south	Northern terminus of KY 1208
	6.527	10.504	KY 1621 south (Brier Fork Road)	Northern terminus of KY 1621
Fannin	6.591	10.607	KY 32	Northern terminus
1.000 mi = 1.609 km; 1.000 km = 0.621 mi

== Kentucky Route 720 ==
Kentucky Route 720
- Location: near Tar Hill-Sonora
- Length: 25.832 mi (41.573 km)

Kentucky Route 720 is a 25.832-mile-long (41.573 km) rural secondary state highway in northern Grayson County and southern Hardin County that runs from Mt. Hebron Road, Floyd Clark Road, and St. Paul Road northeast of Tar Hill to Kentucky Route 84 in southern Sonora via Tar Hill, Saint Paul, Big Clifty, Lacon, Spurrier, and Flint Hill.

=== Major intersections ===
County	Location	mi	km	Destinations	Notes
Grayson		0.000	0.000	Mt. Hebron Road / Floyd Clark Road / St. Paul Road	Western terminus; continues as St. Paul Road beyond Mt. Hebron Road and Floyd Clark Road
Grayson	Tar Hill	2.160	3.476	KY 920 (Salt River Road)	
Grayson		5.843	9.403	US 62 west (Elizabethtown Road)	West end of US 62 overlap
Grayson	Big Clifty	6.820	10.976	US 62 east (Elizabethtown Road) / Hughes Mill Road	East end of US 62 overlap
Grayson		10.614	17.082	KY 1168 north (Summit Road)	Northern terminus of KY 1168
Hardin		16.905	27.206	KY 1866 north (Copelin Road)	Southern terminus of KY 1866
Hardin	Flint Hill	19.078	30.703	KY 2800 south (Cash Road)	Northern terminus of KY 2800
Hardin		20.910	33.651	KY 1921 south (Upton-Melrose Road) / Hornback Lane	Northern terminus of KY 1921
Hardin		22.145	35.639	KY 1868 north (New Glendale Road)	Southern terminus of KY 1868
Hardin	Sonora	25.832	41.573	KY 84 (East Western Avenue / Main Street)	Eastern terminus
1.000 mi = 1.609 km; 1.000 km = 0.621 mi: Concurrency terminus

== Kentucky Route 721 ==
Kentucky Route 721
- Location: near Cordia-Fisty
- Length: 6.6 mi (10.6 km)

Kentucky Route 721 is a 6.6-mile-long (10.6 km) rural secondary state highway in western Knott County that runs from Kentucky Route 1088 southeast of Cordia to Kentucky Route 550 at Fisty via Ritchie.

== Kentucky Route 722 ==
Kentucky Route 722
- Length: 4.332 mi (6.972 km)

Kentucky Route 722 is a 4.332-mile-long (6.972 km) rural secondary state highway in east central Logan County that runs from Kentucky Route 1588 to U.S. Route 68.

=== History ===
KY 722 was formed by 1957.

The original KY 722 ran from US 62 (now KY 93) in Iuka to KY 453 in Grand Rivers; this became part of KY 917 when that route was extended south (now decommissioned south of new US 62).

== Kentucky Route 723 ==
Kentucky Route 723
- Location: Pinckneyville-Tolu
- Length: 18.257 mi (29.382 km)

Kentucky Route 723 is a 18.257-mile-long (29.382 km) rural secondary state highway in eastern Livingston County and northwestern Crittenden County that runs from Haynes Park Road and a boat ramp on the Cumberland River in Pinckneyville to Kentucky Route 135 and School Avenue in southern Tolu via Salem and Irma.

=== Major intersections ===
County	Location	mi	km	Destinations	Notes
Livingston	Pinckneyville	0.000	0.000	Haynes Park Road / boat ramp	Southern terminus; continues as boat ramp beyond Haynes Park Road
Livingston		4.555	7.331	KY 1433 west (Cedar Grove Road)	Eastern terminus of KY 1433
Livingston	Salem	5.635	9.069	US 60 / KY 133 (Main Street)	
Crittenden		13.170	21.195	KY 838 west (Lola Road)	Eastern terminus of KY 838
Crittenden		14.497	23.331	KY 297 south / Irma-White Road	South end of KY 297 overlap
Crittenden		15.520	24.977	KY 297 north	North end of KY 297 overlap
Crittenden	Tolu	18.257	29.382	KY 135 / School Avenue	Northern terminus; continues as School Avenue beyond KY 135
1.000 mi = 1.609 km; 1.000 km = 0.621 mi: Concurrency terminus

== Kentucky Route 724 ==
Kentucky Route 724
- Location: near Future City-near Grahamville
- Length: 3.249 mi (5.229 km)

Kentucky Route 724 is a 3.249-mile-long (5.229 km) rural secondary and supplemental state highway in west central McCracken County that runs from Kentucky Route 3520 northeast of Future City to Kentucky Route 358 southeast of Grahamville.

=== Major intersections ===
The entire route is in McCracken County.

Location	mi	km	Destinations	Notes
	0.000	0.000	KY 3520 (Old Highway 60)	Southern terminus
	0.278	0.447	US 60	
	0.983	1.582	KY 725 south (Woodville Road)	South end of KY 725 overlap
	1.660	2.672	KY 725 north (Woodville Road)	North end of KY 725 overlap
	3.249	5.229	KY 358 (Ogden Landing Road)	Northern terminus
1.000 mi = 1.609 km; 1.000 km = 0.621 mi: Concurrency terminus

== Kentucky Route 725 ==
Kentucky Route 725
- Location: West Paducah-near Rossington
- Length: 11.341 mi (18.252 km)

Kentucky Route 725 is a 11.341-mile-long (18.252 km) rural secondary state highway in northwestern McCracken County that runs from Kentucky Route 305 at West Paducah to Kentucky Route 358 west of Rossington via Maxon Crossing, Heath, Cimota City, and Woodville.

=== Major intersections ===
The entire route is in McCracken County.

Location	mi	km	Destinations	Notes
West Paducah	0.000	0.000	KY 305 (Cairo Road)	Southern terminus
	1.319	2.123	KY 724 south (Steele Road)	South end of KY 724 overlap
	1.996	3.212	KY 724 north (Bradford Road)	North end of KY 724 overlap
Heath	2.660	4.281	KY 996 (Metropolis Lake Road)	
	3.597	5.789	KY 726 south (Kelley Road)	Northern terminus of KY 726
	4.617	7.430	KY 1154 south (Hobbs Road)	Northern terminus of KY 1154
	5.788	9.315	KY 995 south (Rice Springs Road) / Old Riceville Road	Northern terminus of KY 995
Cimota City	6.379	10.266	KY 1321 north (Bethel Church Road) / Bethel Church Road	Southern terminus of KY 1321
Woodville	7.128	11.471	KY 2532 south (Apperson Road) / Park Lane	Northern terminus of KY 2532
Woodville	7.595	12.223	KY 473 (Woodville Road / New Liberty Church Road)	
	11.341	18.252	KY 358 (Ogden Landing Road) / New Liberty Church Road	Northern terminus; continues as New Liberty Church Road beyond KY 358
1.000 mi = 1.609 km; 1.000 km = 0.621 mi: Concurrency terminus

== Kentucky Route 726 ==
Kentucky Route 726
- Location: near Lovelaceville-near Heath
- Length: 6.441 mi (10.366 km)

Kentucky Route 726 is a 6.441-mile-long (10.366 km) rural secondary and supplemental state highway in western McCracken County that runs from U.S. Route 62 northeast of Lovelaceville to Kentucky Route 725 west of Heath via West Future City.

=== Major intersections ===
The entire route is in McCracken County.

Location	mi	km	Destinations	Notes
	0.000	0.000	US 62 (Blandville Road)	Southern terminus
	0.432	0.695	KY 1322 east (Harris Road)	Western terminus of KY 1322
	1.200	1.931	KY 286	
	4.215	6.783	KY 996 north (Old Hinkleville Road)	South end of KY 996 overlap
	4.273	6.877	KY 996 south (Old Hinkleville Road)	North end of KY 996 overlap
West Future City	4.738	7.625	KY 3520 (Old Highway 60)	
	5.000	8.047	US 60	
	6.441	10.366	KY 725 (Woodville Road)	Northern terminus
1.000 mi = 1.609 km; 1.000 km = 0.621 mi: Concurrency terminus

== Kentucky Route 729 ==
Kentucky Route 729
- Location: near Liletown-near Pierce
- Length: 5.245 mi (8.441 km)

Kentucky Route 729 is a 5.245-mile-long (8.441 km) rural secondary state highway in southwestern Green County that runs from U.S. Route 68 south of Liletown to Kentucky Route 218 southwest of Pierce.

=== History ===
KY 729 was formed ca. 1955.

The original KY 729 ran from US 119 (now KY 2545) in Thornton north to the small community of Farraday; this is now part of KY 1862.

== Kentucky Route 730 ==
Kentucky Route 730
- Location: Lamasco–Eddyville
- Length: 11.784 mi (18.965 km)

Kentucky Route 730 is an 11.784-mile-long (18.965 km) rural secondary highway in eastern Lyon County. The highway begins at KY 903 north of Lamasco. KY 730 heads northwest and crosses Sand Hollow Creek and the Eddy Creek arm of Lake Barkley. The highway meets the eastern end of KY 818 before crossing Glass Creek at its junction with KY 293 at Saratoga. KY 730 runs concurrently with KY 293 west to the latter route's terminus at KY 93. Along the way, the routes have two junctions with KY 818 and a diamond interchange with I-24. At the KY 93–KY 293 junction, KY 730 also meets the eastern end of KY 1055. KY 730 heads north along KY 93 and splits west at the south city limit of Eddyville. The highway meets the western end of KY 1055 shortly before the highway reaches Lake Barkley, where the highway turns onto Water Street, which passes between the lake and the Kentucky State Penitentiary, to its terminus at a dead end.

=== Major intersections ===
The entire route is in Lyon County.

Location	mi	km	Destinations	Notes
	0.000	0.000	KY 903	Southern terminus
	5.521– 5.558	8.885– 8.945	KY 818 north (Old Saratoga-Gray Farm Road)	Southern terminus of KY 818
Saratoga	6.127	9.860	KY 293 north	South end of KY 293 overlap
	7.892	12.701	KY 818 south (Old Saratoga-Gray Farm Road)	South end of KY 818 overlap
	8.031	12.925	KY 818 north	North end of KY 818 overlap
	8.239– 8.291	13.259– 13.343	I-24 – Paducah, Nashville	I-24 exit 45
	8.599	13.839	KY 93 south / KY 1055 west	North end of KY 293 overlap; south end of KY 93 overlap; southern terminus of KY 293; eastern terminus of KY 1055
	8.941	14.389	KY 6017 north / Ausenbaugh Road	Southern terminus of KY 6017
	9.197	14.801	KY 93 north – Eddyville	North end of KY 93 overlap
Eddyville	10.746	17.294	KY 1055 east	Western terminus of KY 1055
Eddyville	11.784	18.965	Dead end	Northern terminus
1.000 mi = 1.609 km; 1.000 km = 0.621 mi: Concurrency terminus

== Kentucky Route 731 ==
Kentucky Route 731
- Location: Paducah
- Length: 1.579 mi (2.541 km)

Kentucky Route 731 is a 1.579-mile-long (2.541 km) rural secondary state highway in western downtown Paducah that runs from U.S. Routes 45 and 62 to U.S. Route 60 and Downs Drive.

=== History ===
KY 731 was formed after 1961.

The original KY 731 ran from KY 15 in Jackson north to KY 15; this was decommissioned ca. 1961 when KY 15 was rerouted over most of this road (now part of KY 205 after another rerouting), and the old route of KY 15 became KY 1812 (which replaced part of the road) and the rest was decommissioned and is now known as Panbowl Road.

== Kentucky Route 732 ==
Kentucky Route 732
- Location: near Van Cleave-near Boatwright
- Length: 9.571 mi (15.403 km)

Kentucky Route 732 is a 9.571-mile-long (15.403 km) rural secondary state highway in eastern Calloway County that runs from Kentucky Route 94 and Todd Road to Waterview Lane and Richard Lane along Kentucky Lake east of Boatwright.

=== Major intersections ===
The entire route is in Calloway County.

Location	mi	km	Destinations	Notes
	0.000	0.000	KY 94 / Todd Road	Western terminus; continues as Todd Road beyond KY 94
	4.730	7.612	KY 1346 east (Russell Drive)	West end of KY 1346 overlap
	5.205	8.377	KY 1346 west (Liberty Road)	East end of KY 1346 overlap
	7.558	12.163	KY 972 north (Snipe Creek Drive)	Southern terminus of KY 972
	9.571	15.403	Waterview Lane / Richard Lane	Eastern terminus
1.000 mi = 1.609 km; 1.000 km = 0.621 mi: Concurrency terminus

== Kentucky Route 733 ==
Kentucky Route 733
- Location: near Lebanon Junction-Cravens
- Length: 17.774 mi (28.604 km)

Kentucky Route 733 is a 17.774-mile-long (28.604 km) rural secondary state highway in southeastern Bullitt County and western Nelson County that runs from Kentucky Route 61 northeast of Lebanon Junction to U.S. Route 62 at Cravens west of Bardstown via Bellwood.

=== Major intersections ===
County	Location	mi	km	Destinations	Notes
Bullitt		0.000	0.000	KY 61 (Preston Highway)	Western terminus
Nelson		6.729	10.829	US 62 (Boston Road)	
Nelson	Cravens	17.774	28.604	US 62 (Boston Road)	Eastern terminus
1.000 mi = 1.609 km; 1.000 km = 0.621 mi

== Kentucky Route 734 ==
Kentucky Route 734
- Location: near Snow-near Ida
- Length: 4.632 mi (7.454 km)

Kentucky Route 734 is a 4.632-mile-long (7.454 km) rural secondary state highway in north central Clinton County that runs from U.S. Route 127 and Kentucky Route 90 north of Snow to US 127 again northwest of Ida via Seventy Six.

=== Major intersections ===
The entire route is in Clinton County.

Location	mi	km	Destinations	Notes
	0.000	0.000	US 127 / KY 90 – Albany, Monticello, Burkesville	Southern terminus
	0.136	0.219	KY 3062 east (Seventy Six Falls Road)	Western terminus of KY 3062
	0.969	1.559	KY 639 south	Northern terminus of KY 639
	2.656	4.274	KY 1266 north	Southern terminus of KY 1266
	3.787	6.095	KY 1553 south	Northern terminus of KY 1553
	4.632	7.454	US 127 – Jamestown, Albany	Northern terminus
1.000 mi = 1.609 km; 1.000 km = 0.621 mi

== Kentucky Route 736 ==
Kentucky Route 736
- Location: near Caneyville-near Falling Branch
- Length: 20.045 mi (32.259 km)

Kentucky Route 736 is a 20.045-mile-long (32.259 km) rural secondary state highway in western and northern Grayson County that runs from Kentucky Route 79 and Lawrence Hayes Road southwest of Caneyville to Kentucky Route 110 south of Falling Branch via Do Stop, Spring Lick, and Yeaman.

=== Major intersections ===
The entire route is in Grayson County.

Location	mi	km	Destinations	Notes
	0.000	0.000	KY 79 (Morgantown Road) / Lawrence Hayes Road	Southern terminus; continues as Lawrence Hayes Road beyond KY 79
Do Stop	2.882	4.638	US 62 (Beaver Dam Road)	
	11.239	18.087	KY 54 west	South end of KY 54 overlap
	11.571	18.622	KY 54 east	North end of KY 54 overlap
	17.133	27.573	KY 79 (Falls of Rough Road)	
	20.045	32.259	KY 110 (Blue Bird Road)	Northern terminus
1.000 mi = 1.609 km; 1.000 km = 0.621 mi: Concurrency terminus

== Kentucky Route 738 ==
Kentucky Route 738
- Location: Wolf River Dock—Albany
- Length: 6.706 mi (10.792 km)

Kentucky Route 738 is a 6.706-mile-long (10.792 km) rural secondary state highway in west southwestern Clinton County. The route runs from the Wolf River Dock on Dale Hollow Lake just a few feet north of the Tennessee state line to U.S. Route 127 Business in southern Albany.

=== History ===
KY 738 was formed by 1968; it was formerly part of KY 55.

The original KY 738 ran from US 42 to US 60 in Louisville, and was later converted to freeway and extended, but it became I-264 by 1962.

=== Major intersections ===
The entire route is in Clinton County.

Location	mi	km	Destinations	Notes
Dale Hollow Lake	0.000	0.000	Wolf River Dock	Southern terminus
	3.273	5.267	KY 3065 north	Southern terminus of KY 3065
	4.773	7.681	KY 1576 south	Northern terminus of KY 1576
	5.519	8.882	US 127	
Albany	6.706	10.792	US 127 Bus. (Tennessee Road)	Northern terminus
1.000 mi = 1.609 km; 1.000 km = 0.621 mi

== Kentucky Route 739 ==
Kentucky Route 739
- Location: near Dripping Spring–near Oakville
- Length: 4.700 mi (7.564 km)

Kentucky Route 739 is a 4.700-mile-long (7.564 km) rural secondary state highway in south central Logan County. The route runs from Kentucky Route 1041 southeast of Dripping Spring to Kentucky Route 96 northwest of Oakville and south of Russellville. It is known as Johnson Young Road for its entire length.

=== History ===
KY 739 was formed by 1957.

The original KY 739 was a loop off of KY 35 (now KY 2141) in Moreland via Community Center Drive.

== Kentucky Route 740 ==
Kentucky Route 740
- Location: Glasgow–Park
- Length: 13.807 mi (22.220 km)

Kentucky Route 740 is a 13.807-mile-long (22.220 km) rural secondary highway in northeastern Barren County. The highway begins at US 68 and KY 80, which run concurrently on Edmonton Road, just east of the city of Glasgow. KY 740 heads northeast along Coral Hill Road, which crosses Beaver Creek and meets the western end of KY 2131 (French Mill Road) at Coral Hill. The highway parallels and crosses Duff Branch and intersects KY 70 (Hiseville Main Street) in Hiseville. KY 740 continues northeast along Hiseville–Park Road, which crosses Blue Spring Creek and intersects KY 571 (Seymour–Park Road) at Park. The highway parallels the Barren–Metcalfe county line to its terminus at KY 677 at the Barren–Hart county line very close to the Barren–Metcalfe–Hart county tripoint. KY 677 heads north onto Hart County and southeast into Metcalfe County.

=== Major intersections ===
County	Location	mi	km	Destinations	Notes
Barren		0.000	0.000	US 68 / KY 80 (Edmonton Road)	Southern terminus
Barren		3.510	5.649	KY 2131 east (Coral Hill–Halfway Road)	Western terminus of KY 2131
Barren	Hiseville	7.468	12.019	KY 70 (Hiseville Main Street)	
Barren		10.985	17.679	KY 571 north (Seymour–Park Road)	Southern terminus of KY 571
Barren		13.785	22.185	KY 677 south (Roberts Road)	South end of KY 677 overlap
Barren–Hart county line		13.785	22.185	KY 677 north	Northern terminus; north end of KY 677 overlap; continues solely as KY 677 into Hart County
1.000 mi = 1.609 km; 1.000 km = 0.621 mi: Concurrency terminus

== Kentucky Route 741 ==
Kentucky Route 741
- Location: near Revelo
- Length: 0.812 mi (1,307 m)

Kentucky Route 741 is a 0.812-mile-long (1.307 km) rural secondary state highway in McCreary County west of Revelo. The route runs from 0.1-mile (0.16 km) south of Kentucky Route 742 to Kentucky Route 1651.

=== Major intersections ===
The entire route is in McCreary County.

Location	mi	km	Destinations	Notes
	0.000	0.000	Dead end	Southern terminus
	0.100	0.161	KY 742	
	0.812	1.307	KY 1651	Northern terminus
1.000 mi = 1.609 km; 1.000 km = 0.621 mi

== Kentucky Route 742 ==
Kentucky Route 742
- Location: Big South Fork NRRA–Revelo
- Length: 5.109 mi (8.222 km)

Kentucky Route 742 is a 5.109-mile-long (8.222 km) rural secondary highway in central McCreary County. The highway begins on Mine 18 Road at the boundary of Big South Fork National River and Recreation Area. KY 742 heads south and curves back north and crosses Roaring Paunch Creek. The highway passes through Hickory Grove and intersects KY 741 near its southern end before reaching its eastern terminus at KY 1651 at Revelo.

=== Major intersections ===
The entire route is in McCreary County.

Location	mi	km	Destinations	Notes
Big South Fork NRRA	0.000	0.000	Blue Heron Road	Western terminus; state maintenance begins 0.737-mile (1.186 km) west of Foster Road; continues as Blue Heron Road beyond point
	4.660	7.500	KY 741	
Revelo	5.109	8.222	KY 1651	Eastern terminus
1.000 mi = 1.609 km; 1.000 km = 0.621 mi

== Kentucky Route 743 ==
Kentucky Route 743
- Location: Tuckertown–Pig
- Length: 12.914 mi (20.783 km)

Kentucky Route 743 is a 12.914-mile-long (20.783 km) rural secondary highway in northeastern Warren County and southern Edmonson County. The highway begins at US 31W (Louisville Road) west of Tuckertown. KY 743 follows Boiling Springs Road, which heads northwest to its junction with KY 2630 (Fairview Boiling Springs Road) then heads north toward the Warren–Edmonson county line. The highway crosses Little Beaverdam Creek south of the county line and meets the eastern end of KY 1749 (Wingfield Church Road). KY 743 continues along Chalybeate School Road, which turns east toward Chalybeate. The highway crosses Alexander Creek, meets the northern end of KY 2326 (Otter Gap Road), and meets the southern end of KY 3611 just west of its northern intersection with KY 101 (Chalybeate Road) south of Chalybeate. KY 743 runs concurrently south with KY 101, then the former highway turns east onto New Grove Road. The highway crosses Beaverdam Creek on its way to its end at KY 422 (Pig Road) south of Pig.

=== Major intersections ===
County	Location	mi	km	Destinations	Notes
Warren		0.000	0.000	US 31W (Louisville Road)	Southern terminus
Warren		1.514	2.437	KY 2630 south (Fairview Boiling Springs Road)	Northern terminus of KY 2630
Edmonson		4.216	6.785	KY 1749 west	Eastern terminus of KY 1749
Edmonson		7.801	12.554	KY 2326 west (Otter Gap Road) / Sulphur Road	Eastern terminus of KY 2326
Edmonson		9.124	14.684	KY 3611 north / Old Beaver Dam Road	Southern terminus of KY 3611
Edmonson		9.211	14.824	KY 101 north (Chalybeate Road)	South end of KY 101 overlap
Edmonson		9.771	15.725	KY 101 south (Chalybeate Road)	North end of KY 101 overlap
Edmonson		12.914	20.783	KY 422 (Pig Road)	Northern terminus
1.000 mi = 1.609 km; 1.000 km = 0.621 mi: Concurrency terminus

== Kentucky Route 744 ==
Kentucky Route 744
- Location: near Durhamtown–near Mannsville
- Length: 17.544 mi (28.234 km)

Kentucky Route 744 is a 17.544-mile-long (28.234 km) rural secondary highway that runs across northern Taylor County. The route runs from Kentucky Route 210 and Fallen Timber Road southwest of Durhamtown to Kentucky Route 337 north of Mannsville via Durhamtown, Saloma and Spurlington.

=== Major intersections ===
The entire route is in Taylor County.

Location	mi	km	Destinations	Notes
	0.000	0.000	KY 210 / Fallen Timber Road	Western terminus; continues as Fallen Timber Road beyond KY 210
Saloma	2.259	3.636	KY 527 north / Saloma School Road	West end of KY 527 overlap
Saloma	2.414	3.885	KY 527 south	East end of KY 527 overlap
	3.939	6.339	KY 289 north (Old Lebanon Road)	West end of KY 289 overlap
	4.269	6.870	KY 289 south (Old Lebanon Road)	East end of KY 289 overlap
	6.873	11.061	KY 1400 west (Owl Creek Road)	Eastern terminus of KY 1400
	7.716	12.418	KY 634 north (Philpot Road)	Southern terminus of KY 634
	10.570	17.011	US 68 / KY 55 – Campbellsville, Lebanon	West end of KY 208 overlap; southern terminus of KY 208
	10.614	17.082	KY 208 north – Calvary	East end of KY 208 overlap
	13.295	21.396	KY 2784 south (Wooleyville Road)	Northern terminus of KY 2784
	17.544	28.234	KY 337 (Bradfordsville Road)	Eastern terminus
1.000 mi = 1.609 km; 1.000 km = 0.621 mi: Concurrency terminus

== Kentucky Route 745 ==
Kentucky Route 745
- Location: Sulphur Well–Exie
- Length: 8.783 mi (14.135 km)

Kentucky Route 745 is a 8.783-mile-long (14.135 km) rural secondary highway that runs across northeastern Metcalfe County and south central Green County through mostly rural areas. The route follows Mell Ridge Road, running from U.S. 68 east of Sulphur Well to Kentucky Route 487 south of Exie.

=== Major intersections ===
County	Location	mi	km	Destinations	Notes
Metcalfe		0.000	0.000	US 68	Southern terminus
Green		8.783	14.135	KY 487	Northern terminus, continues north as KY 487
1.000 mi = 1.609 km; 1.000 km = 0.621 mi
