= Kentucky Route 93 =

State highway in Kentucky, United States

Kentucky Route 93
- KY 93 highlighted in red

Route information
- Maintained by KYTC

Southern segment
- Length: 27.734 mi (44.634 km)
- South end: KY 139 / KY 276 in rural Lyon Co
- Major intersections: US 62 / US 641 in Eddyville; I-24 / I-69 near Eddyville
- North end: KY 810 / KY 819 / Iuka Ferry Road near Eddyville

Northern segment
- Length: 4.516 mi (7.268 km)
- South end: KY 917 / Short Drive near Iuka
- North end: KY 453 in rural Livingston Co

Location
- Country: United States
- State: Kentucky
- Counties: Lyon, Livingston

Highway system
- Kentucky State Highway System; Interstate; US; State; Parkways
← KY 92	→ KY 94

Kentucky Route 93 (KY 93) is a 27.734-mile (44.634 km) state highway in western Kentucky.

== Route description ==
The route is separated into two segments. The southern segment runs from Kentucky Routes 139 and 276 southeast of the unincorporated community of Lamasco to Kentucky Route 810, Kentucky Route 819, and Iuka Ferry Road northwest of Kuttawa via Lamasco, Confederate, and Eddyville. The northern segment runs from Kentucky Route 917 and Short Drive just east of Iuka to Kentucky Route 453 in rural Livingston County several miles east of Iuka via Iuka. It appears that the two segments were originally or meant to be connected, as both segments are just a few miles apart. It appears that they were to connect at the Cumberland River, at which the northern segment ends on the western bank and a rural road, likely what was or is to be part of KY 93, ends on the east bank.

== History ==
KY 93 previously ran from the Tennessee State line in Trigg County to Fredonia via Cadiz, Eddyville and Kuttawa. KY 93 north of Eddyville is now US 641, while the highway from the Lyon-Caldwell-Trigg County tripoint southward is now signed as KY 139.

KY 93 was reassigned to US 62's old alignment west of Kuttawa to Iuka via the now-discontinued ferry service when US 62 was reallocated to a new alignment providing a more-direct route to Paducah in the mid-1950s.

== Major intersections ==
County	Location	mi	km	Destinations	Notes
Lyon		0.000	0.000	KY 139 (Princeton Road) / KY 276 (Blackhawk Road)	Southern terminus
Lyon		2.527	4.067	KY 778 south	Northern terminus of KY 778
Lyon	Lamasco	3.941	6.342	KY 903 north / KY 1097 south	Southern terminus of KY 903; northern terminus of KY 1097
Lyon	Confederate	7.576	12.192	KY 274 south	Northern terminus of KY 274
Lyon		12.938	20.822	KY 293 north / KY 730 west / KY 1055 south	South end of KY 730 overlap; southern terminus of KY 293; eastern terminus of KY 1055
Lyon		13.280	21.372	KY 6017 north / Ausenbaugh Road	Southern terminus of KY 6017
Lyon		13.536	21.784	KY 730 north	North end of KY 730 overlap
Lyon		13.910	22.386	KY 6016 east (Eshler Loop)	Western terminus of KY 6016
Lyon	Eddyville	12.265	19.739	KY 3305 north	Southern terminus of KY 3305
Lyon	Eddyville	16.509	26.569	US 62 east / US 641 north	South end of US 62/US 641 overlap
Lyon	Eddyville	17.192	27.668	KY 373 north	Southern terminus of KY 373
Lyon	Eddyville	17.280	27.809	KY 295 (Lake Barkley Drive)	
Lyon		18.618	29.963	I-24 / I-69 – Nashville	I-24/I-69 exit 40
Lyon		18.978	30.542	KY 6011 east	Western terminus of KY 6011
Lyon		19.333	31.113	US 62 west / US 641 south / KY 295 north	North end of US 62/US 641 overlap; southern terminus of KY 295
Lyon		20.245	32.581	KY 819 west	Eastern terminus of KY 819
Lyon		23.218	37.366	KY 810 north / KY 819 east / Iuka Ferry Road	Northern terminus; northern terminus of KY 810; western terminus of KY 819; continues as Iuka Ferry Road
Gap in route
Livingston		0.000	0.000	KY 917 south (Stringtown Road) / Short Drive	Southern terminus; south end of KY 917 overlap
Livingston	Iuka	0.246	0.396	KY 917 north (Tuckers Temple Road)	North end of KY 917 overlap
Livingston		0.426	0.686	KY 2225 south (Jake Dukes Road)	Northern terminus of KY 2225
Livingston		4.105	6.606	KY 866 north (Paradise Road)	Southern terminus of KY 866
Livingston		4.516	7.268	KY 453 (Dover Road / Iuka Road)	Northern terminus
1.000 mi = 1.609 km; 1.000 km = 0.621 mi: Concurrency terminus
