= Kentucky Route 358 =

US state highway

Kentucky Route 358
- KY 358 highlighted in red

Route information
- Maintained by KYTC
- Length: 29.590 mi (47.620 km)

Major junctions
- West end: KY 286 near New York
- US 60 in LaCenter; KY 310 near LaCenter; KY 473 in Bandana; KY 725 near Rossington; KY 996 in Grahamville; KY 724 near Grahamville
- East end: KY 305 near Paducah

Location
- Country: United States
- State: Kentucky
- Counties: Ballard, McCracken

Highway system
- Kentucky State Highway System; Interstate; US; State; Parkways
← KY 357	→ KY 359

Kentucky Route 358 (KY 358) is a 29.590-mile-long (47.620 km) state highway in the U.S. state of Kentucky. The highway connects mostly rural areas of Ballard and McCracken counties with LaCenter.

== Route description ==
=== Ballard County ===
KY 358 begins at an intersection with KY 286 (Wickliffe Road) east-northeast of New York, within Ballard County, where the roadway continues as Flournoy Road. It travels to the north and travels through Hinkleville. The highway curves to the west. After it curves to the west-northwest and crosses over Little Humphrey Creek, it enters LaCenter. It curves to the north-northwest has a one-block concurrency with US 60 (West Kentucky Drive) to the east-northeast. When KY 358 splits off, it resumes its north-northwesterly direction. It passes a U.S. Post Office before it leaves the city limits of LaCenter. It crosses over Humphrey Slough and curves to the north-northeast. It crosses over Humphrey Creek and curves to the northeast. After it intersects KY 310 (Dennis Jones Road / Turner Landing Road), it begins a gradual curve to the north-northeast. KY 358 enters Bandana, where it has a very brief concurrency with KY 473 (Woodville Road / Oscar Road). It continues to the north-northeast and intersects KY 1782 (Monkey Eyebrow Road / Bandana Road). At this intersection, the highway turns right, to the east-southeast and enters McCracken County.

=== McCracken County ===
KY 358 travels through Ragland and then intersects the northern terminus of KY 1563 (Ingleside Road). It crosses over Newtons Creek and then intersects the northern terminus of KY 1564 (Joppa Landing Road). The highway crosses over Nasty Creek and intersects the northern terminus of KY 725 (New Liberty Church Road). It curves to a nearly due east direction and intersects the northern terminus of KY 1321 (Rossington Road). It then travels through Rossington and begins to curve to the southeast before it crosses over Bayou Creek. It passes Martin Cemetery and enters the West Kentucky Wildlife Management Area. When it crosses over Little Bayou Creek, it leaves the WMA. The highway has a very brief concurrency with KY 996 (Metropolis Lake Road) to the south-southwest. They split in Grahamville. KY 358 resumes its east-southeast trek and intersects the northern terminus of KY 724 (Bradford Road). The highway passes Palestine Cemetery and travels under a railroad bridge that carries some railroad tracks of Illinois Central Railroad. It travels through Palestine and intersects the northern terminus of KY 1565 (Mayfield–Metropolis Road). The highway crosses over Massac Creek before it intersects KY 2411 (Cold Springs Road). Almost immediately, it meets its eastern terminus, an intersection with KY 305 (Old Cairo Road).

== Major intersections ==
County	Location	mi	km	Destinations	Notes
Ballard		0.000	0.000	KY 286 (Wickliffe Road)	Western terminus
Ballard	LaCenter	7.984	12.849	US 60 west (West Kentucky Drive) – Wickliffe	Western end of US 60 concurrency
Ballard	LaCenter	7.984	12.849	US 60 east (West Kentucky Drive) – Paducah	Eastern end of US 60 concurrency
Ballard		9.984	16.068	KY 310 (Dennis Jones Road / Turner Landing Road)	
Ballard	Bandana	13.482	21.697	KY 473 south (Woodville Road)	Western end of KY 473 concurrency
Ballard	Bandana	13.530	21.774	KY 473 north (Oscar Road)	Eastern end of KY 473 concurrency
Ballard		15.966	25.695	KY 1782 (Monkey Eyebrow Road / Bandana Road)	
McCracken		18.801	30.257	KY 1563 south (Ingleside Road)	Northern terminus of KY 1563
McCracken		19.731	31.754	KY 1564 south (Joppa Landing Road)	Northern terminus of KY 1564
McCracken		20.792	33.461	KY 725 south (New Liberty Church Road)	Northern terminus of KY 725
McCracken		21.948	35.322	KY 1321 south (Rossington Road)	Northern terminus of KY 1321
McCracken		25.916	41.708	KY 996 north (Metropolis Lake Road)	Western end of KY 996 concurrency
McCracken	Grahamville	26.169	42.115	KY 996 south (Metropolis Lake Road)	Eastern end of KY 996 concurrency
McCracken		26.817	43.158	KY 724 south (Bradford Road)	Northern terminus of KY 724
McCracken		28.605	46.035	KY 1565 south (Mayfield–Metropolis Road)	Northern terminus of KY 1565
McCracken		29.505	47.484	KY 2411 (Cold Springs Road)	
McCracken		29.590	47.620	KY 305 (Old Cairo Road)	Eastern terminus
1.000 mi = 1.609 km; 1.000 km = 0.621 mi: Concurrency terminus
