= WOCS =

WOCS may refer to:

- WOCS-LP, a low-power radio station (93.7 FM) serving Orangeburg, South Carolina
- WEBF, a radio station (88.3 FM) licensed to serve Lerose, Kentucky, United States, which held the call sign WOCS from 2001 to 2011
- Warrant Officer Candidate School
