= WLJC =

WLJC may refer to:

- WLJC (FM), a radio station (102.1 FM) licensed to Beattyville, Kentucky, United States
- WLJC-TV, a television station (channel 7) licensed to Beattyville, Kentucky, United States
