= Kentucky Route 286 =

State highway in Kentucky, United States

Kentucky Route 286
- KY 286 highlighted in red

Route information
- Maintained by KYTC
- Length: 16.6 mi (26.7 km)

Major junctions
- West end: KY 121 in Wickliffe
- KY 802 in New York; KY 358 east of New York; KY 473 in Gage; KY 726 near Paducah
- East end: US 62 near Paducah

Location
- Country: United States
- State: Kentucky
- Counties: Ballard, McCracken

Highway system
- Kentucky State Highway System; Interstate; US; State; Parkways
← KY 285	→ KY 287

Kentucky Route 286 (KY 286) is a 16.6-mile-long (26.7 km) state highway in the U.S. state of Kentucky. The highway connects mostly rural areas of Ballard and McCracken counties with Wickliffe.

== Route description ==
KY 286 begins at an intersection with KY 121 (Court Street) in Wickliffe, within Ballard County. It travels to the northeast and curves to the east and leaves Wickliffe. It travels to the east-northeast and intersects the southern terminus of KY 1279 (Cane Creek Cutoff Road). It continues to the east-northeast and intersects the southern terminus of KY 1345 (Wickliffe Road). Due to KY 1345 being a circular route, the two highways have a second intersection. KY 286 curves to the east-southeast and enters New York, where it intersects KY 802 (New York Road/LaCenter Road). It heads to the east-northeast and intersects the southern terminus of KY 358 (Hinkleville Road). In Gage, the highway intersects the southern terminus of KY 473 (Gage Road). It has an intersection with the southern terminus of KY 2532 (Kevil–Lovelaceville Road) and then the northern terminus of KY 1367 (Hamburg Road). KY 286 then enters McCracken County. It has an intersection with KY 726 (McKendree Church Road). Just after this, it meets its eastern terminus, an intersection with U.S. Route 62 (US 62; Blandville Road).

== Major intersections ==
County	Location	mi	km	Destinations	Notes
Ballard	Wickliffe	0.0	0.0	KY 121 (Court Street) to US 51 / US 62	Western terminus
Ballard		1.2	1.9	KY 1279 north (Cane Creek Cutoff Road)	Southern terminus of KY 1279
Ballard		5.2	8.4	KY 1345 north (Wickliffe Road)	Southern terminus of KY 1345
Ballard		6.0	9.7	KY 1345 (Wickliffe Road/Myers Road)	
Ballard	New York	7.6	12.2	KY 802 (New York Road/LaCenter Road)	
Ballard		8.6	13.8	KY 358 north (Hinkleville Road)	Southern terminus of KY 358
Ballard	Gage	11.1	17.9	KY 473 (Gage Road)	Southern terminus of KY 473
Ballard		13.0	20.9	KY 2532 north (Kevil–Lovelaceville Road)	Southern terminus of KY 2532
Ballard		13.5	21.7	KY 1367 south (Hamburg Road)	Northern terminus of KY 1367
McCracken		15.7	25.3	KY 726 (McKendree Church Road)	
McCracken		16.6	26.7	US 62 (Blandville Road) – Bardwell, Paducah	Eastern terminus
1.000 mi = 1.609 km; 1.000 km = 0.621 mi
