= Channel 65 =

Channel 65 refers to several television stations:

== Canada ==
The following television stations operate on virtual channel 65 in Canada:

- CITY-DT-3 in Ottawa, Ontario

== See also ==
- Channel 65 virtual TV stations in the United States
