= Redwine =

Redwine may refer to:

== People with the surname ==
- David Redwine, American politician
- Hiram G. Redwine, American lawyer whom the Redwine Building is named after
- Jarvis Redwine, American football player
- John Redwine, American physician and politician
- Jon Redwine, American music producer
- Mike Redwine, American football coach
- Sheldrick Redwine (born 1996), American football player

== Places ==
- Redwine, California, former settlement in Mendocino County, California, United States
- Redwine, Kentucky, United States
- Redwine, Tennessee, Cocke County, United States

== See also ==
- Red wine
