= Twin Lakes, Kentucky =

Unincorporated community in Kentucky, United States

- Unincorporated community
- Location in Kentucky Location in the United States
- Coordinates: 36°57′50″N 88°11′24″W
- Country: United States
- State: Kentucky
- County: Lyon
- Elevation: 440 ft (130 m)
- Time zone: UTC-6 (Central (CST))
  - Summer (DST): UTC-5 (CST)
- GNIS feature ID: 509253

Twin Lakes is an unincorporated community in Lyon County, Kentucky, United States.
