= Channel 65 virtual TV stations in the United States =

The following television stations operate on virtual channel 65 in the United States:

- KKPX-TV in San Jose, California
- KTFN in El Paso, Texas
- WDMW-LD in Milwaukee, Wisconsin
- WEDY in New Haven, Connecticut
- WLJC-TV in Beattyville, Kentucky
- WPDN-LD in Pittsburgh, Pennsylvania
- WRBW in Orlando, Florida
- WUPV in Ashland, Virginia
- WUVP-DT in Vineland, New Jersey

The following television station, which is no longer licensed, formerly operated on virtual channel 65 in the United States:

- WUVI-LD in West Lafayette, Indiana
