= WEBF =

- Lerose, Kentucky; United States
- Frequency: 88.3 MHz (HD Radio)

Programming
- Format: Contemporary Christian music
- Network: K-Love

Ownership
- Owner: Hour of Harvest, Inc. (operated by Educational Media Foundation under leasing agreement)
- Sister stations: WLJC (FM), WLJC-TV

History
- First air date: January 8, 1999
- Former call signs: WSPE (1999–2001); WOCS (2001–2011)

Technical information
- Licensing authority: FCC
- Facility ID: 90101
- Class: C2
- ERP: 7,800 watts
- HAAT: 282.1 meters
- Transmitter coordinates: 37°36′23″N 83°41′16″W

Links
- Public license information: Public file; LMS
- Website: www.klove.com

WEBF (88.3 FM) is a K-LOVE-affiliated radio station in Lerose, Kentucky, United States. The station is owned by Hour of Harvest, Inc. and features programming from K-Love. The station is also broadcast on HD radio.

In 2006, Governor Ernie Fletcher honored the station with the Arts Broadcasting Award..

== History ==
The station went on the air as WSPE on January 8, 1999, owned by the Owsley County Schools with studios at Owsley County High School. On July 31, 2001, the station changed its call sign to WOCS, and on March 23, 2011, the station changed its call sign again to the current WEBF.

From 2001 to 2011, then-WOCS served as a repeater for Morehead State University's NPR station, WMKY. However, in 2011, Owsley County Schools sold the station to Hour of Harvest, who then leased the station to K-LOVE.
