= Elkfork, Kentucky =

Unincorporated community in Kentucky, United States

- Unincorporated community
- Location within Kentucky Location within the United States
- Coordinates: 37°57′53″N 83°7′59″W
- Country: United States
- State: Kentucky
- County: Morgan
- Elevation: 856 ft (261 m)
- Time zone: UTC-5 (Eastern (EST))
  - Summer (DST): UTC-4 (EDT)
- ZIP codes: 41421
- GNIS feature ID: 507922

Elkfork (also Elk Fork) is an unincorporated community in Morgan County, Kentucky, United States. It lies along Route 172, northeast of the city of West Liberty, the county seat of Morgan County. Its elevation reaches up to 856 feet (261 m). Although the area is unincorporated, Elkfork contains a post office, with the ZIP code of 41421.

Businesses in Elkfork include Fannins Sawmill, and a dollar general. There is also the Elkfork Masonic Lodge #755 located 2 miles south of the unincorporated community.
