= Bandana, Kentucky =

Census-designated place in Kentucky, United States

- CDP
- Location within the state of Kentucky
- Coordinates: 37°8′40″N 88°56′32″W
- Country: United States
- State: Kentucky
- County: Ballard

Area
  - Total: 1.89 sq mi (4.89 km^{2})
  - Land: 1.89 sq mi (4.89 km^{2})
  - Water: 0.0039 sq mi (0.01 km^{2})
- Elevation: 358 ft (109 m)

Population (2020)
  - Total: 177
  - Density: 93.8/sq mi (36.21/km^{2})
- Time zone: UTC-6 (Central (CST))
  - Summer (DST): UTC-5 (CDT)
- ZIP code: 42022
- Area codes: 270 & 364
- FIPS code: 21-03412
- GNIS feature ID: 2629569

Bandana is a census-designated place (CDP) in Ballard County, Kentucky, United States. As of the 2020 census it had a population of 177.

== History ==
A post office has been in operation at Bandana since 1880. Some say the community was so named for a traveling salesman who carried his goods in a bandana sack, while others believe the name marks an incident when a bandana was lost by a group of pioneers near the site.

== Geography ==
Bandana is located in northern Ballard County at the intersection of Kentucky Route 358 (Bandana Road) and Kentucky Route 473 (Needmore Road / Woodville Road). It is 5 miles (8 km) south of the Ohio River and 22 miles (35 km) west of Paducah.

== Demographics ==
Historical population
| Census | Pop. | Note | %± |
|---|---|---|---|
| 2020 | 177 | | — |
U.S. Decennial Census

As of the census of 2010, there were 203 people, 77 households, and 63 families residing in the CDP. The population density was 212.34 per square mile (81.98/km^{2}). There were 101 housing units at an average density of 105.65 per square mile (40.79/km^{2}). The racial makeup of the CDP was 97.0% White, 2.5% African American, and 0.5% from two or more races.

There were 77 households, out of which 23.4% had children under the age of 18 living with them, 70.1% were married couples living together, 10.4% had a female householder with no husband present, and 18.2% were non-families. 11.7% of all households were made up of individuals living alone, and 9.1% had someone living alone who was 65 years of age or older. The average household size was 2.64 and the average family size was 2.87.

In the CDP, the population was spread out, with 21.7% under 18, 3.9% from 20 to 24, 22.1% from 25 to 44, 30.6% from 45 to 64, and 19.3% who were 65 or older. The median age was 44.9 years. For every 100 females, there were 95.2 males. For every 100 females age 18 and over, there were 91.6 males.

The median income for a household in the CDP was $88,906, and the median income for a family was $88,906. The per capita income for the CDP was $40,536.

== Education ==
There is one school district in the whole county, the Ballard County School District. The district's schools are Ballard County Preschool - Headstart, Ballard County Elementary School, Ballard County Middle School, and Ballard Memorial High School.

== Notable people ==
- Technical Sergeant Morris E. Crain, Medal of Honor recipient for his service during World War II
