= WMKY =

- Morehead, Kentucky; United States
- Broadcast area: Morehead, Kentucky; Mount Sterling, Kentucky; Northeastern Kentucky; East-Central Kentucky
- Frequency: 90.3 (MHz)

Programming
- Format: Public radio
- Affiliations: National Public Radio, Kentucky Public Radio

Ownership
- Owner: Morehead State University

History
- First air date: June 15, 1965; 61 years ago
- Former frequencies: 91.1 MHz (1965-1970)
- Call sign meaning: W Morehead, KentuckY

Technical information
- Licensing authority: FCC
- Facility ID: 43765
- Class: C1
- ERP: 37,000 Watts
- HAAT: 275.6 meters
- Transmitter coordinates: 38°10′38″N 83°24′17″W

Links
- Public license information: Public file; LMS
- Webcast: Listen live
- Website: wmky.org

WMKY (90.3 FM) is a National Public Radio-affiliated station in Morehead, Kentucky. It primarily features National Public Radio programming. Its coverage area extends from the Lexington metropolitan area in the west to the Huntington-Ashland metropolitan area in the east and from southern Ohio in the north to Hazard, Kentucky in the south.

== History ==
The station initially signed on the air on June 15, 1965, as a 10-watt station operating at 91.1 megahertz, operating for four hours daily. A Morehead State University student's term paper in the 1950s was the source of inspiration; the idea caught the attention of then-university president Adrin Doran. Upon signon, WMKY was the first regional state college to build a facility of its kind. Following receipt of a grant from the Kentucky Department of Health, Education and Welfare in 1969, the station would eventually be upgraded to a 50,000 watt facility the following year; the upgrade also heralded a frequency change to 90.3 megahertz. The station became an NPR member station in 1970. It became a 24-hour radio service in 1999.

=== Former repeater stations ===
From 1999 until 2019, the station's programming was simulcast over translator station W202BH in Inez. From 2001 until 2010, WOCS (88.3 MHz, now WEBF) in Booneville simulcast WMKY programming until it was sold to World of Harvest, Inc.
