= Iuka, Kentucky =

Unincorporated community in Kentucky, United States

- Unincorporated community
- Location in Kentucky Location in the United States
- Coordinates: 37°04′51″N 88°14′12″W
- Country: United States
- State: Kentucky
- County: Livingston
- Elevation: 345 ft (105 m)
- Time zone: UTC-6 (Central (CST))
  - Summer (DST): UTC-5 (CST)
- GNIS feature ID: 508320

Iuka is an unincorporated community in southern Livingston County, Kentucky, United States.

== Geography ==
The community is at the intersection of Kentucky Routes 917 and 93. The Cumberland River flows past the east side of the community.
