= Suwanee, Kentucky =

Unincorporated community in Kentucky, United States

- Unincorporated community
- Location in Kentucky Location in the United States
- Coordinates: 37°03′01″N 88°09′55″W
- Country: United States
- State: Kentucky
- County: Lyon
- Elevation: 433 ft (132 m)
- Time zone: UTC-6 (Central (CST))
  - Summer (DST): UTC-5 (CST)
- GNIS feature ID: 509168

Suwanee is an unincorporated community in Lyon County, Kentucky, United States.

== History ==
Significant deposits of iron ore were found at Suwanee. Suwanee contained a blast furnace until about 1860.
