= Lone, Kentucky =

Unincorporated community in Kentucky, United States

- Unincorporated community
- Location within Kentucky Location within the United States
- Coordinates: 37°31′48″N 83°36′14″W
- Country: United States
- State: Kentucky
- County: Lee
- Elevation: 751 ft (229 m)
- Time zone: UTC-5 (Eastern (EST))
  - Summer (DST): UTC-4 (EDT)
- ZIP code: 41347
- Area code: 606
- GNIS feature ID: 508495

Lone is an unincorporated community in Lee County, Kentucky. Lone is located on Kentucky Route 708 6.3 miles (10.1 km) east-southeast of Beattyville. Lone has a post office with ZIP code 41347.
