= Kentucky Route 305 =

State highway in Kentucky, United States

Kentucky Route 305
- KY 305 highlighted in red

Route information
- Maintained by KYTC
- Length: 14.3 mi (23.0 km)

Major junctions
- West end: US 62 in Camelia
- KY 786 west of Paducah; US 60 southwest of West Paducah; KY 358 northeast of West Paducah; KY 998 in Paducah; I-24 in Paducah; US 45 in Paducah
- East end: US 60 Bus. in Paducah

Location
- Country: United States
- State: Kentucky
- Counties: McCracken

Highway system
- Kentucky State Highway System; Interstate; US; State; Parkways
← KY 304	→ KY 306

Kentucky Route 305 (KY 305) is a 14.3-mile-long (23.0 km) state highway in the U.S. state of Kentucky. The highway connects mostly rural areas of McCracken County with West Paducah and Paducah.

== Route description ==
KY 305 begins at an intersection with U.S. Route 62 (US 62; Blandville Road) in Camelia, within McCracken County. It travels to the north and intersects the southern terminus of KY 1565 (Moore Road). Then, it curves to the north-northeast. Just south of Barkley Regional Airport, it turns right, to the southeast, and intersects the northern terminus of KY 786 (Old Hinkleville Road). KY 305 resumes its north-northeastern direction and skirts along the eastern edge of the airport. It then intersects KY 3520 (Hinkleville Road). The two highways travel concurrently for one block. One more block later, KY 305 intersects US 60. The highway curves to the east-southeast and then to the northeast. It crosses some Illinois Central Railroad (ICR) tracks and enters West Paducah, where it intersects the eastern terminus of KY 725 (Woodville Road) and crosses over some more ICR railroad tracks. KY 305 then has a second intersection with KY 1565 (Mayfield–Metropolis Road). It crosses over Massac Creek and intersects the southern terminus of KY 2411 (Cold Springs Road) and then the eastern terminus of KY 358 (Ogden Landing Road). At the latter intersection, it curves to the east-northeast. It crosses over some railroad tracks and passes Fern Lake Campground, before entering a western section of Paducah. There, it has an intersection with the northern terminus of KY 998 (Olivet Church Road) and an interchange with Interstate 24 (I-24). The highway then enters Cecil, where it intersects the eastern terminus of KY 1420 (Noble Road). It then begins curving to the east-southeast and enters downtown Paducah. The highway crosses over Perkins Creek and passes Noble Park. It then has an intersection with US 45 (H.C. Mathis Drive). It passes Maplelawn and Oak Grove cemeteries before it meets its eastern terminus, an intersection with US 60 Bus. (Park Avenue/Martin Luther King Jr Drive) on one-way pairs. Here, the roadway continues as North 13th Street.

== Major intersections ==
The entire route is in McCracken County.

Location	mi	km	Destinations	Notes
Camelia	0.0	0.0	US 62 (Blandville Road) – Bardwell, Paducah	Western terminus
	1.3	2.1	KY 1565 north (Moore Road)	Southern terminus of KY 1565
	2.1	3.4	KY 786 south (Old Hinkleville Road)	Northern terminus of KY 786
	3.7	6.0	KY 3520 east (Hinkleville Road)	Western end of KY 3520 concurrency
	4.0	6.4	KY 3520 west (Cairo Road)	Eastern end of KY 3520 concurrency
	4.0	6.4	US 60 – LaCenter, Paducah	
West Paducah	5.3	8.5	KY 725 west (Woodville Road)	Eastern terminus of KY 725
	6.1	9.8	KY 1565 (Mayfield–Metropolis Road)	
	7.8	12.6	KY 2411 north (Cold Springs Road)	Southern terminus of KY 2411
	7.9	12.7	KY 358 west (Ogden Landing Road)	Eastern terminus of KY 358
Paducah	9.7	15.6	KY 998 south (Olivet Church Road)	Northern terminus of KY 998
Paducah	9.8	15.8	I-24 – St. Louis, Nashville	I-24 exit 3
Cecil	11.1	17.9	KY 1420 west (Noble Road)	Eastern terminus of KY 1420
Paducah	13.2	21.2	US 45 (H.C. Mathis Drive) – Metropolis, Mayfield	
Paducah	14.2	22.9	US 60 Bus. west (Park Avenue)	Westbound lanes of US 60 Bus. on one-way pair
Paducah	14.3	23.0	US 60 Bus. east (Martin Luther King Jr Drive)	Eastern terminus; eastbound lanes of US 60 Bus. on one-way pair
1.000 mi = 1.609 km; 1.000 km = 0.621 mi
