= Carmack, Kentucky =

Unincorporated community in Kentucky, United States

- Unincorporated community
- Location in Kentucky Location in the United States
- Coordinates: 37°01′05″N 88°06′57″W
- Country: United States
- State: Kentucky
- County: Lyon
- Elevation: 443 ft (135 m)
- Time zone: UTC-6 (Central (CST))
  - Summer (DST): UTC-5 (CST)
- GNIS feature ID: 507655

Carmack is an unincorporated community in Lyon County, Kentucky, United States. It is located on the shore of Lake Barkley in the Land Between the Lakes National Recreation Area.

It was also known as Pottertown.
