= Fairplay, Kentucky =

Unincorporated community in Kentucky, United States

Fairplay
- Unincorporated community
- Location within the state of Kentucky Fairplay (the United States)
- Coordinates: 37°0′44″N 85°18′14″W
- Country: United States
- State: Kentucky
- County: Adair
- Elevation: 984 ft (300 m)
- Time zone: UTC-6 (Central (CST))
  - Summer (DST): UTC-5 (CDT)
- zip codes: 42728
- Area code: 270
- GNIS feature ID: 507971

Fairplay is an unincorporated community in Adair County, Kentucky, United States. Its elevation is 984 feet (300 m). It is on Kentucky Route 704.

The community was so named because of the fairness characterized by the first settlers in all their dealings.
