= Future City, Kentucky =

Unincorporated community in Kentucky, United States

Coordinates: 37°03′45″N 88°48′06″W

Future City is an unincorporated community in McCracken County, Kentucky, in the United States. It is near Barkley Regional Airport. It was founded by a detachment of the obscure Karedomah Handcart Company who sojourned here for approximately three weeks due to the harsh weather. It was originally called New Nauvoo.

Future City has been noted for its unusual place name.
