= Tar Hill, Kentucky =

Unincorporated community in Kentucky, United States

- Unincorporated community
- Location within Kentucky Location within the United States
- Coordinates: 37°33′56″N 86°13′06″W
- Country: United States
- State: Kentucky
- County: Grayson
- Named after the Federal asphalt mine nearby. The mine and store closed in 1928.: The "Tar Hill store" re-opened in 1928 by the Tulley family in its present location.
- Elevation: 718 ft (219 m)
- Time zone: UTC-6 (Central (CST))
  - Summer (DST): UTC-5 (CDT)
- GNIS feature ID: 509187

Tar Hill is an unincorporated community in Grayson County, Kentucky, United States. On April 26, 2011, two tornadoes hit Tar Hill as part of the 2011 Super Outbreak. The first tornado was rated EF2, was 440 yards (400 m) wide and traversed a path of 3 miles (4.8 km), snapping and uprooting numerous large hardwood trees, destroying a travel trailer, a mobile home, numerous outbuildings and barns, and that fifteen homes had major roof damage. Farm equipment was reportedly thrown 50 yards (46 m). Other reports stated that this tornado destroyed a house, a mobile home, several barns and other buildings. The second tornado was rated as an EF0, was 60 yards (55 m) wide and travelled a path 0.28 miles (450 m), snapping and uprooting trees.
