= Kentucky Route 172 =

State highway in Kentucky, United States

Kentucky Route 172
- KY 172 highlighted in red

Route information
- Maintained by KYTC
- Length: 33.884 mi (54.531 km)

Major junctions
- South end: US 460 / KY 7 in West Liberty
- North end: KY 40 near Paintsville

Location
- Country: United States
- State: Kentucky
- Counties: Morgan, Johnson

Highway system
- Kentucky State Highway System; Interstate; US; State; Parkways
← KY 171	→ KY 173

Kentucky Route 172 (KY 172) is a 33.884-mile-long (54.531 km) state highway in Kentucky that runs from U.S. Route 460 (US 460) and KY 7 in western West Liberty to KY 40 northwest of Paintsville.

== Major intersections ==
County	Location	mi	km	Destinations	Notes
Morgan	West Liberty	0.000	0.000	US 460 / KY 7	Western terminus of KY 172
Morgan		2.894	4.657	KY 1161 west	Eastern terminus of KY 1161
Morgan		5.730	9.222	KY 650 north	Southern terminus of KY 650
Morgan		7.425	11.949	KY 437 east	Western terminus of KY 437
Morgan		9.505	15.297	KY 589 east	Western terminus of KY 589
Morgan	Crockett	13.242	21.311	KY 706 north (Randall-Hutchinson Road)	Southern terminus of KY 706
Morgan		16.879	27.164	KY 1715 east	Western terminus of KY 1715
Morgan		19.847	31.941	KY 437 west	Eastern terminus of KY 437
Morgan		21.138	34.018	KY 1614 north	Southern terminus of KY 1614
Johnson		23.157	37.268	KY 469 north	Southern terminus of KY 469
Johnson		23.464	37.762	KY 3214 south	Northern terminus of KY 3214
Johnson		25.994	41.833	KY 689 north (Cuba Bridge-Cantrell Bridge Road)	Northern terminus of KY 689
Johnson		27.044	43.523	KY 689 north	West end of KY 689 overlap
Johnson		27.104	43.620	KY 689 south	East end of KY 689
Johnson		31.464	50.636	KY 1559 east (Sitko Road)	Western terminus of KY 1559
Johnson		33.884	54.531	KY 40	Eastern terminus
1.000 mi = 1.609 km; 1.000 km = 0.621 mi
