= Buchanan, Kentucky =

Unincorporated community in Kentucky, United States

- Unincorporated community
- Location in Kentucky Location in the United States
- Coordinates: 38°14′38″N 82°36′39″W
- Country: United States
- State: Kentucky
- County: Lawrence
- Elevation: 531 ft (162 m)
- Time zone: UTC-5 (Eastern (EST))
  - Summer (DST): UTC-4 (EDT)
- GNIS feature IDs: 2337450,488179

Buchanan, originally named Mouth of Bear (38°14′36″N 82°36′33″W), is an unincorporated community located in Lawrence County, Kentucky, United States at the mouth of Bear Creek where it joins the Big Sandy River, five miles downstream from the mouth of Blaine Creek.

== History ==
The community's post office was established on January 14, 1830, by county surveyor Reuben Canterbury (alternatively spelled Canterberry), who named the office Canterbury after himself.

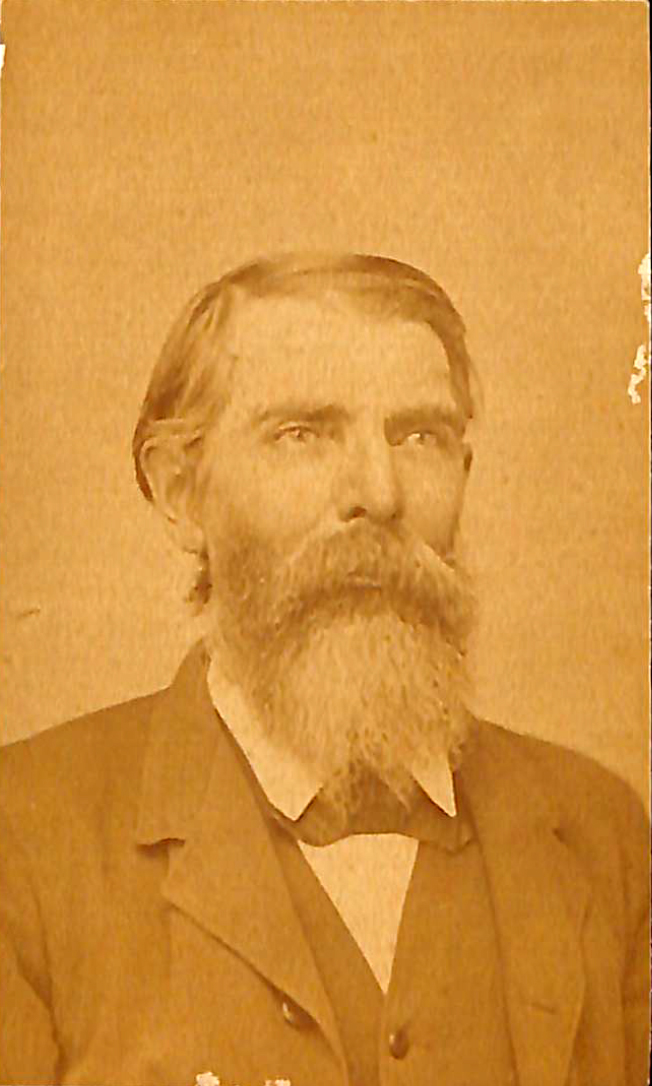
Postmaster George Buchanan

It was later renamed Turman's Ferry in March 1838, by new postmaster and ferryman Benjamin Turman.

It was known as Round Bottom when it was relocated across the river (and state line) to Prichard, West Virginia in June 1853, and then as Buchanan (after then postmaster George Buchanan) when it was relocated back on the creek mouth side of the river in September 1861.

It gained a railway station on the Chattaroi Railroad in 1880, named Rockville (38°14′38″N 82°36′33″W), after some literal rocks that were 100 yards (91 m) north of the creek mouth and south of the railway depot. But in 1891 the railway station and the community were both (re)named Buchanan after the post office. By that time, the community itself comprised several lumber and livestock operations, a hotel, a flour mill, a wagonworks, and some stores.

The post office closed in 1976, having been a rural branch of the Louisa, Kentucky post office since August 1863.

== Sources ==
- Rennick, Robert M. (2000). "Lawrence County — Post Offices & Place Names". County Histories of Kentucky (244). Morehead State University.
- "Mouth of Bear", Geographic Names Information System, United States Geological Survey, United States Department of the Interior
- "Buchanan", Geographic Names Information System, United States Geological Survey, United States Department of the Interior
- "Canterbury Post Office (historical)", Geographic Names Information System, United States Geological Survey, United States Department of the Interior
- "Rockville (historical)", Geographic Names Information System, United States Geological Survey, United States Department of the Interior
- "Rockville Railroad Station (historical)", Geographic Names Information System, United States Geological Survey, United States Department of the Interior
