= Pierce, Kentucky =

Unincorporated community in Kentucky, United States

- Unincorporated community
- Location within Kentucky Location within the United States
- Coordinates: 37°11′11″N 85°36′28″W
- Country: United States
- State: Kentucky
- County: Green
- Elevation: 801 ft (244 m)
- Time zone: UTC-6 (Central (CST))
  - Summer (DST): UTC-5 (CDT)
- GNIS feature ID: 500569

Pierce is an unincorporated community in Green County, Kentucky, United States. It lies along Route 218 southwest of the city of Greensburg, the county seat of Green County. Its elevation is 801 feet (244 m).
