= Jericho, Kentucky =

Unincorporated community in Kentucky, United States

Coordinates: 38.4050672°N 85.2899566°W

Jericho is an unincorporated community in Henry County, Kentucky, in the United States.

== History ==
Jericho was a station on the Louisville and Cincinnati Railroad. A post office was established at Jericho in 1852, and remained in operation until it was discontinued in 1965.

== In Media ==
The Band's "The Caves of Jericho" on their 1993 album Jericho refers to Jericho, Kentucky.
