= Revelo, Kentucky =

Unincorporated community in Kentucky, United States

- Unincorporated community
- Location within Kentucky Location within the United States
- Coordinates: 36°41′00″N 84°28′14″W
- Country: United States
- State: Kentucky
- County: McCreary
- Elevation: 1,404 ft (428 m)
- Time zone: UTC-5 (Eastern (EST))
  - Summer (DST): UTC-4 (EDT)
- ZIP codes: 42638
- GNIS feature ID: 514894

Revelo is an unincorporated community within McCreary County, Kentucky, United States.

Originally a railroad siding for Southern Railway (US), the community was named for James Henry Oliver, an executive Vice President of Southern's Kentucky Division. Oliver was killed in a passenger train collision in 1918 in Danville, Virginia.

"Revilo" is an anadrome of "Oliver". The United States Postal Service changed it to the modern spelling in 1943.
