= Boatwright, Kentucky =

Unincorporated community in Kentucky, United States

- Unincorporated community
- Location within the state of Kentucky Boatwright (the United States)
- Coordinates: 36°38′39″N 88°7′25″W
- Country: United States
- State: Kentucky
- County: Calloway
- Elevation: 377 ft (115 m)
- Time zone: UTC-6 (Central (CST))
  - Summer (DST): UTC-5 (CST)
- GNIS feature ID: 487589

Boatwright is an unincorporated community in Calloway County, Kentucky, United States.
