= Fillmore, Kentucky =

Unincorporated community in Kentucky, United States

- Unincorporated community
- Location in Kentucky Location in the United States
- Coordinates: 37°36′16″N 83°32′59″W
- Country: United States
- State: Kentucky
- County: Lee
- Elevation: 873 ft (266 m)
- Time zone: UTC-6 (Central (CST))
  - Summer (DST): UTC-5 (CST)
- ZIP codes: 41323
- GNIS feature ID: 507998

Fillmore is an unincorporated community in Lee County, Kentucky, United States. Its post office closed in 1996. Census information for Fillmore is under the St. Helens district.
