= Special routes of U.S. Route 127 =

Special routes of U.S. Route 127 may refer to:

- Special routes of U.S. Route 127 in Kentucky, five business and bypass routes
- Business routes of U.S. Route 127 in Michigan, ten business routes
