= Honeybee, Kentucky =

Unincorporated community in Kentucky, United States

- Unincorporated community
- Location within Kentucky Location within the United States
- Coordinates: 36°50′29″N 84°22′20″W
- Country: United States
- State: Kentucky
- County: McCreary
- Elevation: 1,247 ft (380 m)
- Time zone: UTC-6 (Central (CST))
  - Summer (DST): UTC-5 (CST)
- GNIS feature ID: 512765

Honeybee is an unincorporated community in McCreary County, Kentucky, United States. Their post office closed in 1983.

A post office was established in the community in 1905. The place name Honeybee derives from the large populations of honey bees found in the area.
