= Confederate, Kentucky =

Unincorporated community in Kentucky, United States

- Unincorporated community
- Location in Kentucky Location in the United States
- Coordinates: 36°59′31″N 87°59′51″W
- Country: United States
- State: Kentucky
- County: Lyon
- Elevation: 584 ft (178 m)
- Time zone: UTC-6 (Central (CST))
  - Summer (DST): UTC-5 (CST)
- GNIS feature ID: 507743

Confederate is an unincorporated community in Lyon County, Kentucky, United States.
