= Bonny, Kentucky =

Unincorporated community in Kentucky, United States

- Unincorporated community
- Location within Kentucky Location within the United States
- Coordinates: 37°54′29″N 83°21′42″W
- Country: United States
- State: Kentucky
- County: Morgan
- Elevation: 922 ft (281 m)
- Time zone: UTC-5 (Eastern (EST))
  - Summer (DST): UTC-4 (EDT)
- GNIS feature ID: 510844

Bonny is an unincorporated community in Morgan County, Kentucky, United States. A post office named Bonny was opened in 1879 by James Kash. It closed in 1954.
