= Crockett, Kentucky =

Unincorporated community in Kentucky, United States

- Unincorporated community
- Location within Kentucky Location within the United States
- Coordinates: 37°59′8″N 83°5′27″W
- Country: United States
- State: Kentucky
- County: Morgan
- Elevation: 912 ft (278 m)
- Time zone: UTC-5 (Eastern (EST))
  - Summer (DST): UTC-4 (EDT)
- ZIP codes: 41413
- GNIS feature ID: 507784

Crockett is an unincorporated community in Morgan County, Kentucky, United States. It lies along Route 172 northeast of the city of West Liberty, the county seat of Morgan County. Its elevation is 912 feet (278 m). It has a post office with the ZIP code 41413.

A post office was established in 1900 and named for the postmaster Peter Fannin's son, David Crockett Fannin.
