= Wrigley, Kentucky =

Unincorporated community in Kentucky, United States

- Unincorporated community
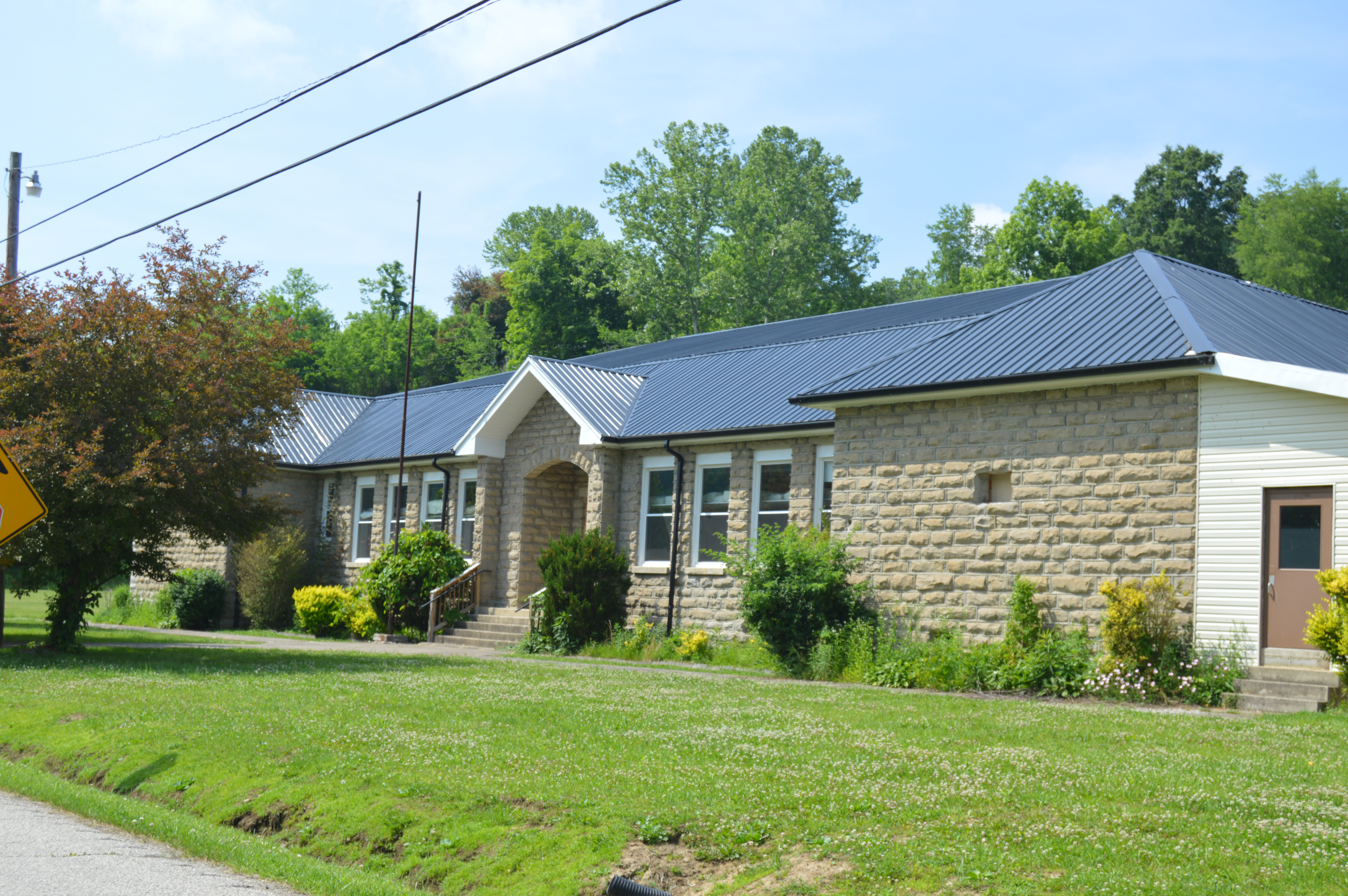
- The former elementary school

- Location within Kentucky Location within the United States
- Coordinates: 38°1′6″N 83°16′17″W
- Country: United States
- State: Kentucky
- County: Morgan
- Elevation: 817 ft (249 m)
- Time zone: UTC-5 (Eastern (EST))
  - Summer (DST): UTC-4 (EDT)
- GNIS feature ID: 516490

Wrigley is an unincorporated community in Morgan County, Kentucky, United States. It lies along Route 7, north of the city of West Liberty, the county seat of Morgan County. It has a post office with the ZIP code 41477.

== Landmarks ==
- Wrigley Falls - natural waterfall
- Wrigley Natural Bridge
- Wrigley Elementary School - constructed by WPA in 1936, now closed.

== Climate ==
The climate in this area is characterized by relatively high temperatures and evenly distributed precipitation throughout the year. The Köppen Climate System describes the weather as humid subtropical, and uses the abbreviation Cfa.

Climate data for Wrigley, Kentucky
Month	Jan	Feb	Mar	Apr	May	Jun	Jul	Aug	Sep	Oct	Nov	Dec	Year
Mean daily maximum °C (°F)	6 (43)	8 (47)	14 (57)	20 (68)	25 (77)	29 (84)	31 (87)	30 (86)	27 (80)	21 (70)	14 (57)	8 (46)	19 (67)
Mean daily minimum °C (°F)	−7 (20)	−6 (21)	−1 (30)	3 (38)	9 (48)	14 (57)	17 (62)	16 (60)	11 (52)	4 (39)	−1 (30)	−5 (23)	4 (40)
Average precipitation mm (inches)	86 (3.4)	81 (3.2)	110 (4.2)	89 (3.5)	110 (4.2)	100 (4)	130 (5.3)	97 (3.8)	81 (3.2)	66 (2.6)	81 (3.2)	91 (3.6)	1,120 (44.2)
Source: Weatherbase
