= Van Cleave, Kentucky =

Unincorporated community in Kentucky, United States

- Unincorporated community
- Location within Kentucky Location within the United States
- Coordinates: 36°39′16.2″N 88°14′20.13″W
- Country: United States
- State: Kentucky
- County: Calloway
- Elevation: 541 ft (165 m)
- Time zone: UTC-6 (Central (CST))
  - Summer (DST): UTC-5 (CDT)
- Area codes: 270 & 364
- GNIS feature ID: 509271

Van Cleave is an unincorporated community in Calloway County, Kentucky United States. The community is centered around the intersection of Van Cleave Road, Elm Grove Road and Todd Road just north of Kentucky Route 80.

The community had a post office from February 7, 1895, to October 14, 1905.
