= Redwine, Kentucky =

Unincorporated community in Kentucky, United States

- Unincorporated community
- Location within Kentucky Location within the United States
- Coordinates: 38°00′58″N 83°13′40″W
- Country: United States
- State: Kentucky
- County: Morgan
- Elevation: 899 ft (274 m)
- Time zone: UTC-6 (Central (CST))
  - Summer (DST): UTC-5 (CST)
- GNIS feature ID: 501687

Redwine is an unincorporated community and coal town in Morgan County, Kentucky, United States. Despite its name, Redwine is located in a dry county.

== History ==
A post office named Redwine opened near the town in 1883 by William B. Redwine, a member of an influential family from Elliott County. It served local industries such as sawmills, lumber dealers, and a flour mill. The post office closed in 1895, but reopened the following year. Sometime between then and 1909, the post office was moved further north, and this new post office operated until 1914. The post office was relocated to its old location soon after, and operated until 1974.
