= Lerose, Kentucky =

Unincorporated community in Kentucky, United States

Lerose
- Unincorporated community
- Location within the state of Kentucky Lerose (the United States)
- Coordinates: 37°28′56″N 83°36′56″W
- Country: United States
- State: Kentucky
- County: Owsley
- Elevation: 741 ft (226 m)
- Time zone: UTC-6 (Central (CST))
  - Summer (DST): UTC-5 (CST)
- ZIP codes: 41344
- GNIS feature ID: 513339

Lerose is a small settlement in Owsley County, Kentucky, United States, in the "Kentucky Highlands" region. It is 370 miles (600 km) from the U.S. capital of Washington, D.C. Nearby places include the county seat of Booneville, Chestnut Gap, and Tallega. It has a cemetery and several hollows. The Lerose community was named after Lleaner Rose, who ran a local store. He was known by the locals as Lee Rose, thus giving the community its current name. "Lee" later had a grandson, Chester Clay Rose, who was killed in the attack on Pearl Harbor on December 7, 1941. His body is entombed in the remains of USS Arizona.
