= WLJC-TV =

Television station in Beattyville, Kentucky

- Beattyville–Lexington, Kentucky; United States
- City: Beattyville, Kentucky
- Channels: Digital: 7 (VHF); Virtual: 65
- Branding: WLJC

Programming
- Affiliations: 65.1: Cozi TV; for others, see § Subchannels

Ownership
- Owner: Margaret Drake (sale to Gray Media pending); (Hour of Harvest, Inc.)
- Sister stations: WLJC (FM), WEBF

History
- First air date: October 16, 1982
- Former channel numbers: Analog: 65 (UHF, 1982–2007)
- Former affiliations: Independent (1982–1986, 2017–2018); TBN (1986–2017)
- Call sign meaning: Wonderful Lord Jesus Christ

Technical information
- Licensing authority: FCC
- Facility ID: 27696
- ERP: 185 kW
- HAAT: 321.5 m (1,055 ft)
- Transmitter coordinates: 37°36′47.3″N 83°40′17.6″W

Links
- Public license information: Public file; LMS
- Website: wljc.com

WLJC-TV (channel 65) is a television station licensed to Beattyville, Kentucky, United States, serving the Lexington area as an affiliate of the digital multicast network Cozi TV. It is owned by local minister Margaret Drake and her ministry, The Hour of Harvest, Inc., which also owns two Christian music radio stations: Air 1 affiliate WLJC and K-LOVE affiliate WEBF. The three outlets share studios on Radio Station Loop north of Beattyville; WLJC-TV's transmitter is located on Tip Top Road.

== History ==
The station first signed on the air on October 16, 1982, and claims to be the oldest Christian television station in Kentucky.

From 2017 through 2022, WLJC carried a half-hour local newscast produced by Lexington ABC affiliate WTVQ at 9 p.m. titled ABC 36 News at Nine on WLJC.

In November 2018, WLJC's main channel began airing Cozi TV programming (which moved from 65.6; that subchannel now airs Start TV).

The station also simulcast the 6:30 p.m. newscast from Fox affiliate WDKY-TV from 2022 through late 2023.

On July 22, 2026, Hour of Harvest filed to have the station's license assigned to Gray Media following a $2.3 million sale; this would make it a sister station to WKYT-TV (channel 27). Hour of Harvest would retain the WLJC call sign and its two radio stations. In documents relating to the sale, Gray indicated that they were "presently in negotiations for an affiliation with a programmer that targets certain underserved audiences that are currently not being served by any of the television stations in the Lexington [market]" and that WKYT "does not have sufficient bandwidth available" to add new HD subchannels to its existing multiplex. Because Gray also owns WYMT-TV in the market (as that station's Perry County base is located within the Lexington television market), the filing also included a request for an ownership exemption to designate WYMT a satellite station so that Gray could continue operating the three stations.

== Technical information ==
=== Subchannels ===
The station's signal is multiplexed:

Subchannels of WLJC-TV
Subchannel	Res.	Short name	Programming
65.1	720p	WLJC-HD	Cozi TV
65.2	480i	Story	Story Television (4:3)
65.3	480i	Ant-TV	Antenna TV (4:3)
65.4	480i	Get-TV	Great (4:3)
65.5	480i	Defy TV	Defy (4:3)
65.6	480i	StartTV	Start TV (4:3)
65.7	480i	H&I	Heroes & Icons (4:3)

=== Analog-to-digital conversion ===
WLJC-TV shut down its analog signal, over UHF channel 65, in July 2007. The station's digital signal remained on its pre-transition VHF channel 7, using virtual channel 65.

The station was granted a construction permit to increase its effective radiated power from 70 kW to 185 kW.

== Coverage area ==
WLJC-TV's digital signal covers much of eastern and central Kentucky as a result of its relatively high antenna position at 322 meters HAAT and a power level of 185,000 watts on the VHF band. Its primary coverage area includes the Lexington metropolitan area, London, and Hazard. Its fringe contour even reaches areas as far north as Maysville, as far east as Pikeville, as far west as Frankfort, and as far south as the Tennessee state line around Middlesboro.
