= Lyon County, Kentucky =

County in Kentucky, United States

- County
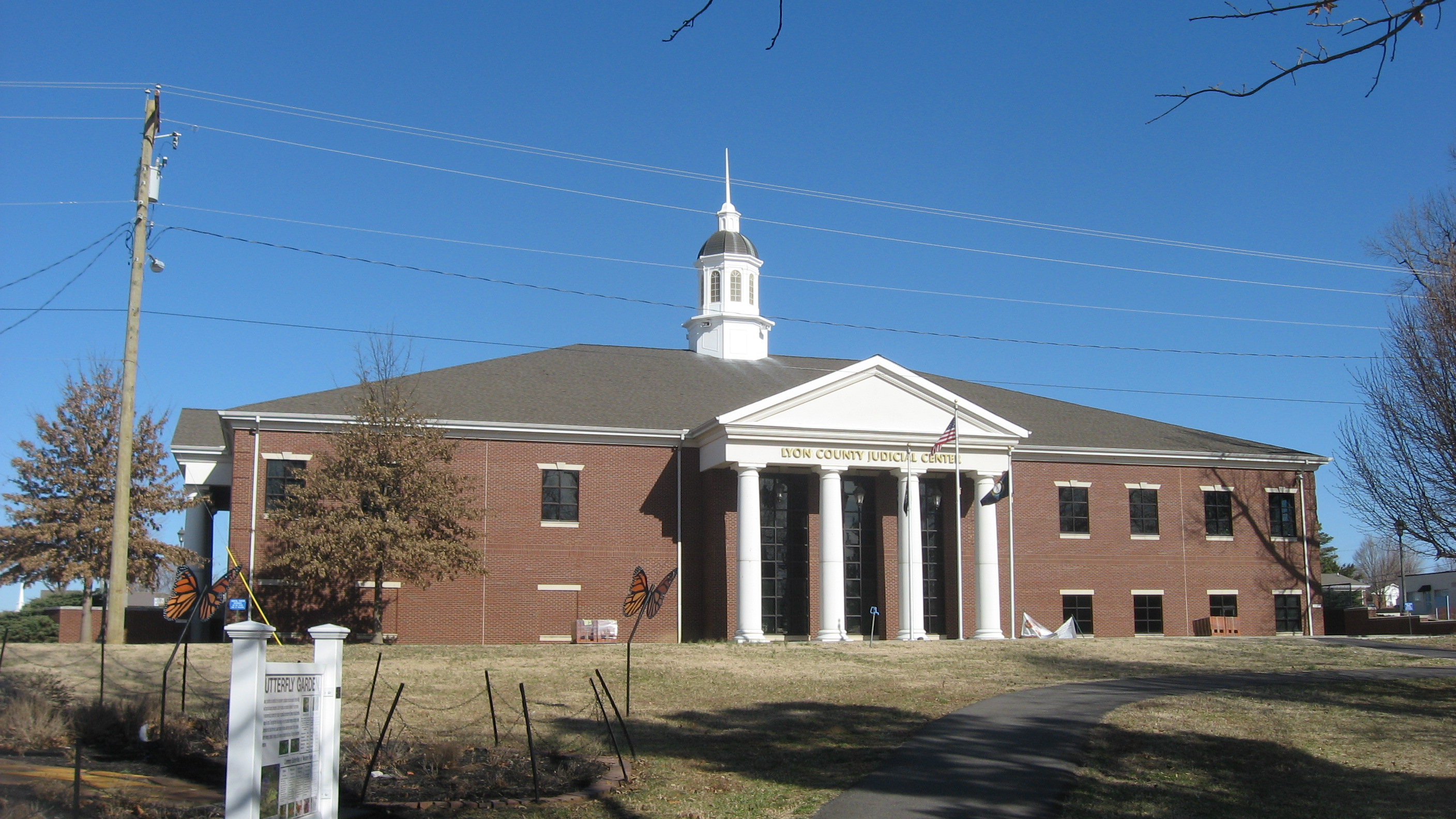
- Lyon County Courthouse in Eddyville, Kentucky.

- Location within the U.S. state of Kentucky
- Coordinates: 37°03′32″N 88°06′49″W
- Country: United States
- State: Kentucky
- Founded: 1854
- Named for: Chittenden Lyon
- Seat: Eddyville
- Largest city: Eddyville

Government
  - Judge/Executive: Jaime Green-Smith (R)

Area
  - Total: 257 sq mi (670 km^{2})
  - Land: 214 sq mi (550 km^{2})
  - Water: 43 sq mi (110 km^{2}) 17%

Population (2020)
  - Total: 8,680
  - Estimate (2025): 9,123 ▲
  - Density: 40.6/sq mi (15.7/km^{2})
- Time zone: UTC−6 (Central)
  - Summer (DST): UTC−5 (CDT)
- Congressional district: 1st
- Website: www.lyoncountyky.com

Lyon County is a county located in the U.S. state of Kentucky. As of the 2020 census, the population was 8,680. Its county seat is Eddyville. The county was formed from Caldwell County, Kentucky in 1854 and named for former Congressman Chittenden Lyon.

== Geography ==
According to the U.S. Census Bureau, the county has a total area of 257 square miles (670 km^{2}), of which 214 square miles (550 km^{2}) is land and 43 square miles (110 km^{2}) (17%) is water.

=== Adjacent counties ===
- Crittenden County (north)
- Caldwell County (east)
- Trigg County (south)
- Marshall County (southwest)
- Livingston County (northwest)

=== National protected area ===
- Land Between the Lakes National Recreation Area (part)

== Demographics ==
Historical population
Census	Pop.	Note	%±
1860	5,307		—
1870	6,233		17.4%
1880	6,768		8.6%
1890	7,628		12.7%
1900	9,319		22.2%
1910	9,423		1.1%
1920	8,795		−6.7%
1930	8,530		−3.0%
1940	9,067		6.3%
1950	6,853		−24.4%
1960	5,924		−13.6%
1970	5,562		−6.1%
1980	6,490		16.7%
1990	6,624		2.1%
2000	8,080		22.0%
2010	8,314		2.9%
2020	8,680		4.4%
2025 (est.)	9,123	▲	5.1%
U.S. Decennial Census; 1790-1960 1900-1990; 1990-2000 2010-2021

=== 2020 census ===
As of the 2020 census, the county had a population of 8,680. The median age was 49.4 years. 13.4% of residents were under the age of 18 and 24.9% of residents were 65 years of age or older. For every 100 females there were 125.7 males, and for every 100 females age 18 and over there were 129.9 males age 18 and over.

The racial makeup of the county was 89.5% White, 5.9% Black or African American, 0.3% American Indian and Alaska Native, 0.4% Asian, 0.0% Native Hawaiian and Pacific Islander, 1.0% from some other race, and 2.9% from two or more races. Hispanic or Latino residents of any race comprised 1.8% of the population.

0.0% of residents lived in urban areas, while 100.0% lived in rural areas.

There were 3,327 households in the county, of which 20.5% had children under the age of 18 living with them and 23.5% had a female householder with no spouse or partner present. About 31.4% of all households were made up of individuals and 16.4% had someone living alone who was 65 years of age or older.

There were 4,780 housing units, of which 30.4% were vacant. Among occupied housing units, 79.7% were owner-occupied and 20.3% were renter-occupied. The homeowner vacancy rate was 3.8% and the rental vacancy rate was 9.3%.

=== 2000 census ===
As of the census of 2000, there were 8,080 people, 2,898 households, and 2,043 families living in the county. The population density was 38 per square mile (15/km^{2}). There were 4,189 housing units at an average density of 19 per square mile (7.3/km^{2}). The racial makeup of the county was 91.86% White, 6.72% Black or African American, 0.30% Native American, 0.17% Asian, 0.01% Pacific Islander, 0.40% from other races, and 0.54% from two or more races. 0.73% of the population were Hispanic or Latino of any race.

The largest ancestry groups in Lyon County, Kentucky according to the census of 2000 are:

- English - 21%
- Irish - 15%
- German - 12%
- African - 7%
- French - 4%
- Scottish - 2%
- Scots-Irish - 20%
- Dutch - 2%

There were 2,898 households, out of which 25.10% had children under the age of 18 living with them, 59.80% were married couples living together, 8.10% had a female householder with no husband present, and 29.50% were non-families. 26.80% of all households were made up of individuals, and 12.20% had someone living alone who was 65 years of age or older. The average household size was 2.26 and the average family size was 2.70.

The age distribution was 15.80% under the age of 18, 7.50% from 18 to 24, 32.90% from 25 to 44, 27.00% from 45 to 64, and 16.80% who were 65 years of age or older. The median age was 42 years. For every 100 females there were 133.50 males. For every 100 females age 18 and over, there were 138.10 males.

The median income for a household in the county was $31,694, and the median income for a family was $39,940. Males had a median income of $36,034 versus $21,806 for females. The per capita income for the county was $16,016. About 10.20% of families and 12.70% of the population were below the poverty line, including 17.30% of those under age 18 and 13.30% of those age 65 or over.

== Communities ==
=== Cities ===
- Eddyville (county seat)
- Kuttawa

=== Unincorporated communities ===
- Carmack
- Confederate
- Commerce Landing
- Eddy Bay
- Eden Bay
- Confederate
- Greenacres
- Indian Hills
- Lamasco
- Palisades
- Paradise Hills
- Saratoga
- Suwanee
- Twin Lakes
- Wildhood Hills

== Notable residents ==
- Keen Johnson, publisher and Kentucky governor, born in Lyon County, 1896
- Hylan Benton Lyon, Confederate general and Kentucky political figure
- Forrest Pogue, World War II Historian, born in Lyon County, 1912
- Travis Perry, University of Kentucky's men's basketball player

== Politics ==
United States presidential election results for Lyon County, Kentucky
Year	Republican		Democratic		Third party(ies)	
Year	No.	%	No.	%	No.	%
1912	568	31.98%	996	56.08%	212	11.94%
1916	748	38.16%	1,191	60.77%	21	1.07%
1920	1,275	38.85%	1,968	59.96%	39	1.19%
1924	993	36.33%	1,696	62.06%	44	1.61%
1928	1,215	48.39%	1,286	51.21%	10	0.40%
1932	873	29.31%	2,099	70.46%	7	0.23%
1936	929	33.19%	1,861	66.49%	9	0.32%
1940	921	31.57%	1,979	67.84%	17	0.58%
1944	924	34.53%	1,743	65.13%	9	0.34%
1948	582	26.18%	1,505	67.70%	136	6.12%
1952	746	34.57%	1,404	65.06%	8	0.37%
1956	989	39.01%	1,527	60.24%	19	0.75%
1960	1,024	42.61%	1,379	57.39%	0	0.00%
1964	583	29.06%	1,412	70.39%	11	0.55%
1968	579	29.88%	719	37.10%	640	33.02%
1972	1,030	58.52%	687	39.03%	43	2.44%
1976	585	26.34%	1,606	72.31%	30	1.35%
1980	968	38.31%	1,496	59.20%	63	2.49%
1984	969	42.97%	1,272	56.41%	14	0.62%
1988	1,077	44.47%	1,337	55.20%	8	0.33%
1992	820	30.34%	1,583	58.56%	300	11.10%
1996	999	34.03%	1,641	55.89%	296	10.08%
2000	1,688	49.36%	1,680	49.12%	52	1.52%
2004	2,132	54.32%	1,769	45.07%	24	0.61%
2008	2,220	57.59%	1,577	40.91%	58	1.50%
2012	2,412	62.83%	1,373	35.76%	54	1.41%
2016	2,789	70.39%	1,045	26.38%	128	3.23%
2020	3,100	73.32%	1,092	25.83%	36	0.85%
2024	3,187	76.12%	950	22.69%	50	1.19%

=== Elected officials ===
Elected officials as of January 3, 2025
U.S. House	James Comer (R)	KY 1
Ky. Senate	Jason Howell (R)	1
Ky. House	Chris Freeland (R)	6

== Education ==
The school district for all of the county is Lyon County School District.

== See also ==
- National Register of Historic Places listings in Lyon County, Kentucky
