= Grahamville, Kentucky =

Unincorporated community in Kentucky, United States

Coordinates: 37°06′27″N 88°46′48″W

Grahamville is an unincorporated community in McCracken County, in the U.S. state of Kentucky.

== History ==
Grahamville was platted in 1877 by Zelotes Clinton Graham, who gave the community his last name. A post office called Grahamville was established in 1888, and remained in operation until 1909. A variant name was "Grahamsville".
