= Lamasco, Kentucky =

Unincorporated community in Kentucky, United States

- Unincorporated community
- Location in Kentucky Location in the United States
- Coordinates: 36°59′10″N 87°56′10″W
- Country: United States
- State: Kentucky
- County: Lyon
- Elevation: 561 ft (171 m)
- Time zone: UTC-6 (Central (CST))
  - Summer (DST): UTC-5 (CST)
- GNIS feature ID: 495933

Lamasco is an unincorporated community in Lyon County, Kentucky, United States. It was previously known as Parkersville, Cross Plains, and Flat Woods.
