= New York, Kentucky =

Unincorporated community in Kentucky, United States

New York
- Unincorporated community
- Location within the state of Kentucky New York (the United States)
- Coordinates: 36°59′20″N 88°57′9″W
- Country: United States
- State: Kentucky
- County: Ballard
- Elevation: 459 ft (140 m)
- Time zone: UTC-6 (Central (CST))
  - Summer (DST): UTC-5 (CST)
- GNIS feature ID: 508696

New York is an unincorporated community located in Ballard County, Kentucky, United States. It has a population of 10, and is about 19 miles away from the city of Paducah.
