= National Register of Historic Places listings in Owsley County, Kentucky =

Location of Owsley County in Kentucky

This is a list of the National Register of Historic Places listings in Owsley County, Kentucky.

It is intended to be a complete list of the properties on the National Register of Historic Places in Owsley County, Kentucky, United States. The locations of National Register properties for which the latitude and longitude coordinates are included below, may be seen in a map.

There is 1 property listed on the National Register in the county.

This National Park Service list is complete through NPS recent listings posted December 12, 2025.

== Current listing ==
	Name on the Register	Image	Date listed	Location	City or town	Description
1	Moyers Buildings	Moyers Buildings	October 29, 1982 (#82001575)	S. Court St. 37°28′32″N 83°40′31″W	Booneville	

== See also ==
- List of National Historic Landmarks in Kentucky
- National Register of Historic Places listings in Kentucky
