= Ricetown, Kentucky =

Unincorporated community in Kentucky, United States

Ricetown
- Unincorporated community
- Location within the state of Kentucky Ricetown (the United States)
- Coordinates: 37°23′24″N 83°37′22″W
- Country: United States
- State: Kentucky
- County: Owsley
- Elevation: 817 ft (249 m)
- Time zone: UTC-6 (Central (CST))
  - Summer (DST): UTC-5 (CST)
- ZIP codes: 41364
- GNIS feature ID: 514908

Ricetown is an unincorporated community located in Owsley County, Kentucky, United States.

The community derives its name from Harvey Rice, who was a local merchant.
