= Lucky Fork, Kentucky =

Unincorporated community in Kentucky, United States

Lucky Fork
- Unincorporated community
- Location within the state of Kentucky Lucky Fork (the United States)
- Coordinates: 37°22′3″N 83°34′12″W
- Country: United States
- State: Kentucky
- County: Owsley
- Elevation: 928 ft (283 m)
- Time zone: UTC-6 (Eastern (EST))
  - Summer (DST): UTC-5 (CST)
- GNIS feature ID: 513727

Lucky Fork is an unincorporated community located in Owsley County, Kentucky, United States. Their Post Office no longer exists, it closed in June 1972.

According to tradition, Lucky Fork was so named on account of the area being a hunter's paradise.
