= 2016 Oregon Republican presidential primary =

- May 17, 2016

28 pledged delegates to the Republican National Convention
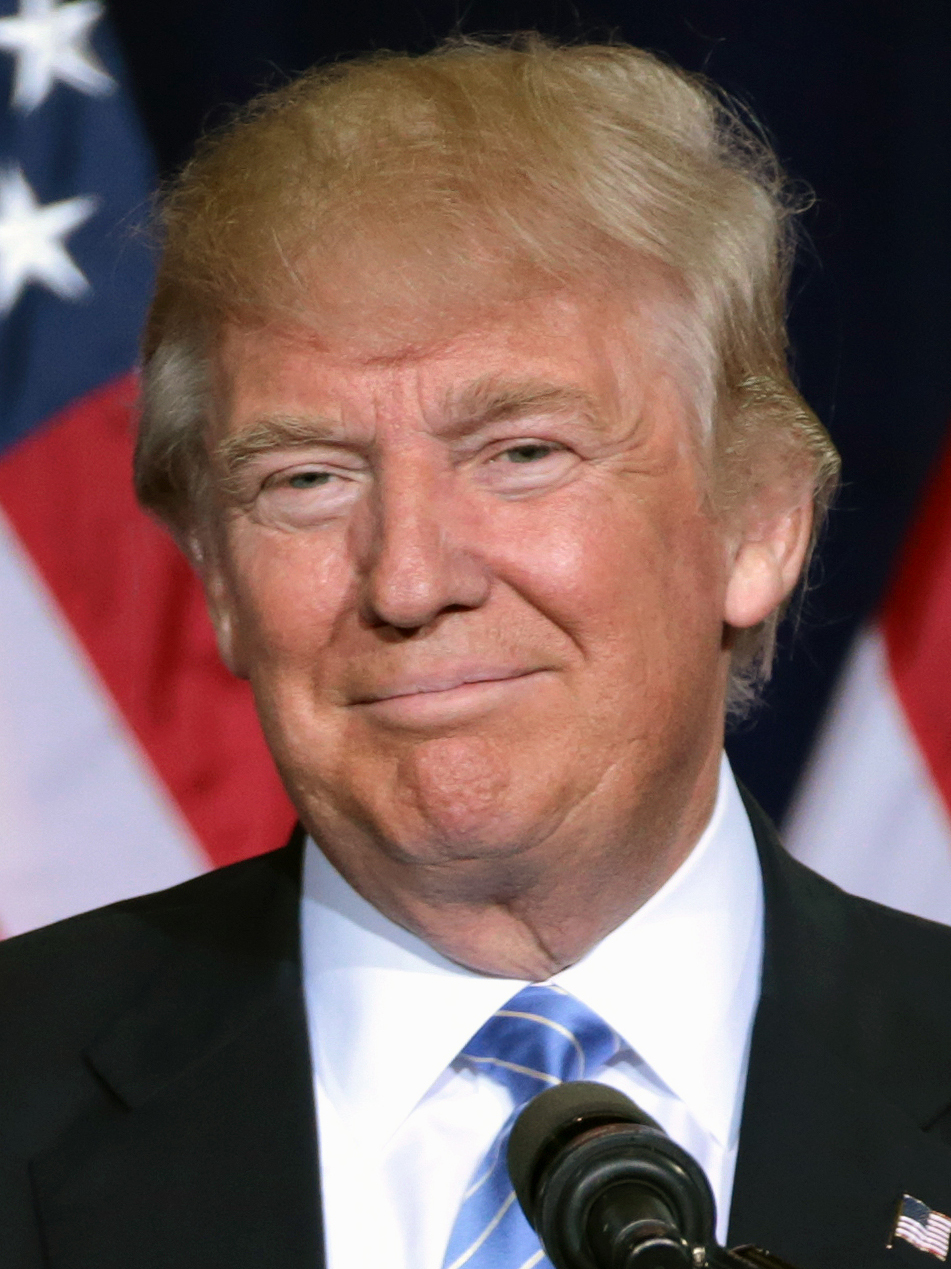

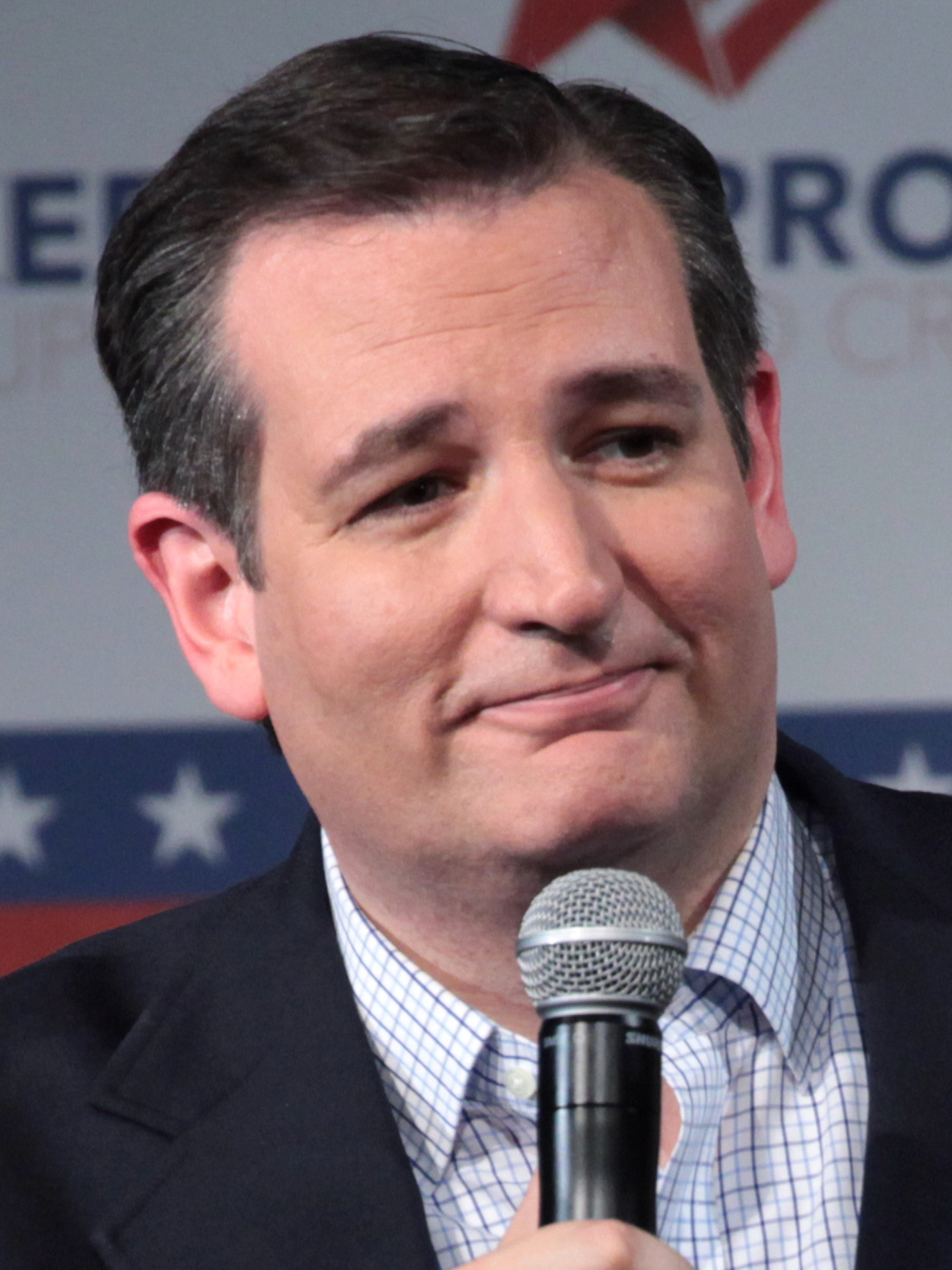

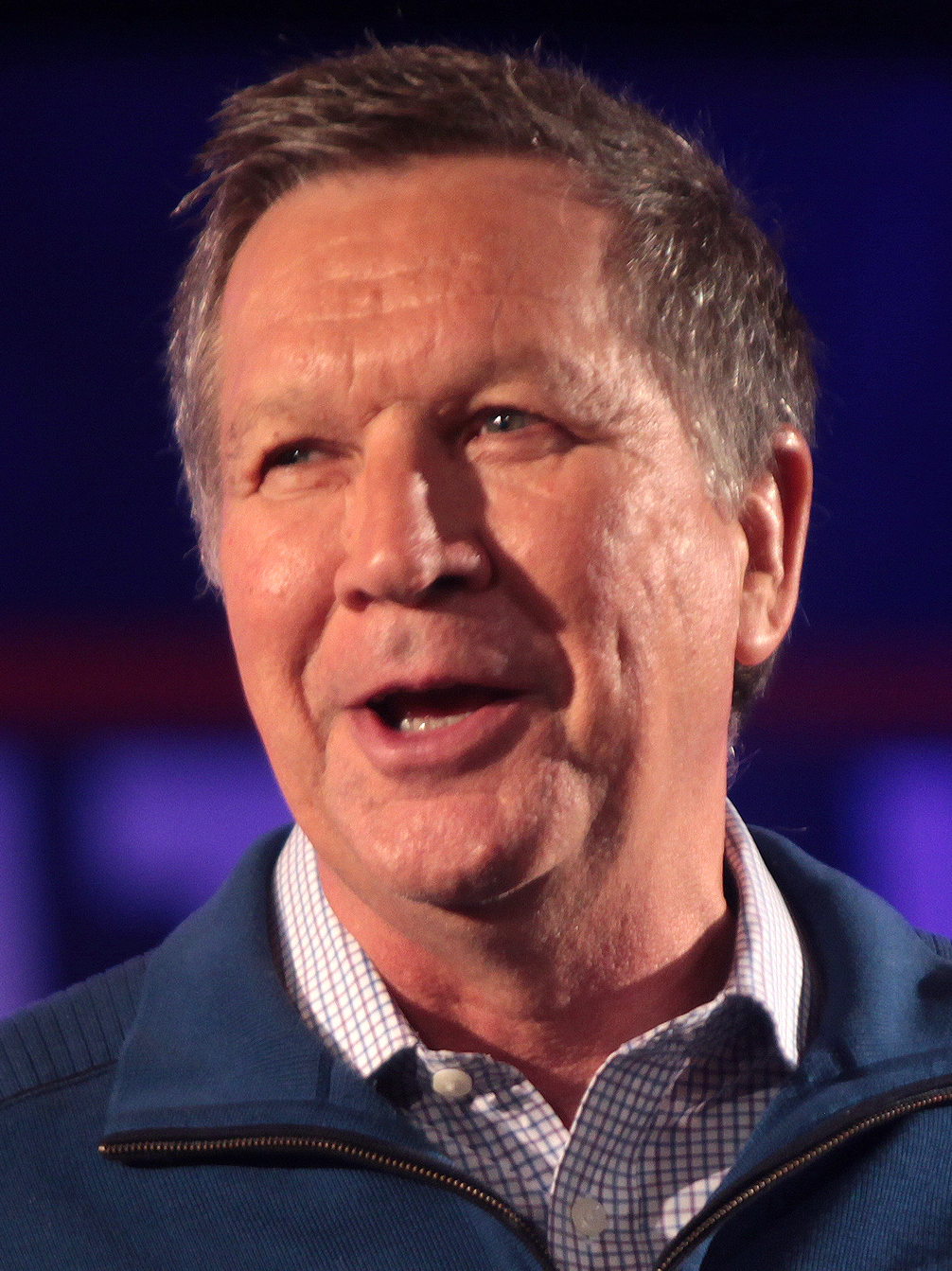
| Candidate | Donald Trump | Ted Cruz (withdrawn) | John Kasich (withdrawn) |
| Home state | New York | Texas | Ohio |
| Delegate count | 18 | 5 | 5 |
| Popular vote | 252,748 | 65,513 | 62,248 |
| Percentage | 64.16% | 16.63% | 15.80% |
Donald Trump
50–60%
60–70%
70–80%

The 2016 Oregon Republican presidential primary was held on May 17 in the U.S. state of Oregon as one of the Republican Party's primaries ahead of the 2016 presidential election.

On the same day, the Democratic Party held their Oregon primary and their Kentucky primary, while the Republican Party did not hold any other primaries on that day.

Oregon has always voted for the nominee of the Republican Party in every statewide primary since 1944, except in 1964.

== Opinion polling ==
List of polls
Main article: United States presidential election in Oregon, 2016

Winner: Donald Trump
Primary date: May 17, 2016

| Poll source | Date | 1st | 2nd | 3rd | Other |
|---|---|---|---|---|---|
| Primary results | May 17, 2016 | Donald Trump; 64.51% | Ted Cruz; 16.50% | John Kasich; 15.83% | |
| DHM Research/Oregon Public Broadcasting/Fox 12 Margin of error: ± 5.7% Sample size: 324 | May 6–9, 2016 | Donald Trump 45% | Ted Cruz; 14% | John Kasich; 14% | Undecided 19%, Wouldn't Vote 7% |
| Hoffman Research Margin of error: ± 4.16% Sample size: 555 | April 26–27, 2016 | Donald Trump 43% | Ted Cruz; 26% | John Kasich; 17% | Undecided 13% |
| DHM Research Margin of error: ± 7.7% Sample size: 169 | July 22–27, 2015 | Donald Trump; 18% | Scott Walker 12% | Jeb Bush 11% | Ted Cruz 10%, Ben Carson 9%, Rand Paul 6%, Mike Huckabee 6%, John Kasich 4%, Marco Rubio 3%, Chris Christie 2%, Carly Fiorina 2%, Rick Santorum 2%, Bobby Jindal 1%, Rick Perry 1%, Lindsey Graham 0%, Jim Gilmore 0%, George Pataki 0%, Other 2%, DK 12% |
| Public Policy Polling Margin of error: ± 5.1% Sample size: 375 | May 22–27, 2014 | Mike Huckabee; 21% | Ted Cruz; 16% | Jeb Bush; 15% | Rand Paul 15%, Chris Christie 12%, Marco Rubio 4%, Paul Ryan 3%, Scott Walker 3%, Rick Santorum 2%, Someone else/Not sure 10% |

== Results ==
Oregon Republican primary, May 17, 2016
| Candidate | Votes | Percentage | Actual delegate count | | |
| Candidate | Votes | Percentage | Bound | Unbound | Total |
|---|---|---|---|---|---|
| Donald Trump | 252,748 | 64.16% | 18 | 0 | 18 |
| Ted Cruz (withdrawn) | 65,513 | 16.63% | 5 | 0 | 5 |
| John Kasich (withdrawn) | 62,248 | 15.80% | 5 | 0 | 5 |
| Write-in | 13,411 | 3.40% | 0 | 0 | 0 |
| Unprojected delegates: | | | 0 | 0 | 0 |
| Total: | 393,920 | 100.00% | 28 | 0 | 28 |
Source: The Green Papers

== See also ==
- 2016 Oregon Democratic presidential primary
