= Earle Combs =

American baseball player (1899–1976)

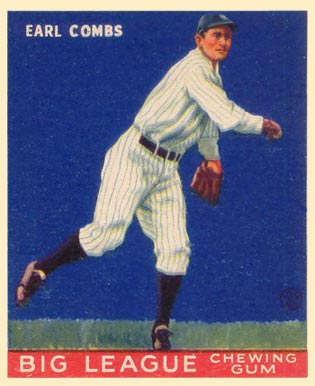
- Center fielder
- Born: May 14, 1899; Pebworth, Kentucky, U.S.
- Died: July 21, 1976 (aged 77); Richmond, Kentucky, U.S.
- Batted: Left Threw: Right

MLB debut
- April 16, 1924, for the New York Yankees

Last MLB appearance
- September 29, 1935, for the New York Yankees

MLB statistics
- Batting average: .325
- Home runs: 58
- Runs batted in: 633
- Stats at Baseball Reference

Teams
- New York Yankees (1924–1935)

Career highlights and awards
- 9× World Series champion (1927, 1928, 1932, 1936–1939, 1941, 1943)

Member of the National

Baseball Hall of Fame
- Induction: 1970
- Election method: Veterans Committee

Earle Bryan Combs (May 14, 1899 – July 21, 1976) was an American professional baseball player who played his entire career for the New York Yankees (1924–1935). Combs batted leadoff and played center field on the Yankees' fabled 1927 team (often referred to as Murderers' Row). He is one of six players on that team who have been inducted into the Baseball Hall of Fame; the other five are Waite Hoyt, Herb Pennock, Tony Lazzeri, Lou Gehrig and Babe Ruth.

Combs led the league in triples three times and was among the top ten in the category in several other seasons. He suffered a fractured skull and other injuries from a crash into an outfield wall in 1934, then retired after another injury the next season. Nicknamed "the Kentucky Colonel", Combs was known as a gentleman on and off the field. He remained in baseball as a coach for many years after his retirement as a player.

== Biography ==
=== Early years ===
Combs was born in Pebworth, Owsley County, Kentucky. As a child, he played baseball games with tree limbs as bats and with baseballs made out of string and the material of old shoes.

=== College ===
Combs left Pebworth in 1917 to enter Eastern Kentucky State Normal School (now Eastern Kentucky University) in Richmond. In those early days, Eastern prepared its students to become teachers. On completion of a two-year program, graduates were often employed in rural one-room schools. They were often responsible for forty or more students, ranging in age from six to teen-age in grades 1–8, so the work required much management skill.

In his first year at Eastern, Combs put on a stellar performance in a faculty-student baseball game and was encouraged to join the school team by Dr. Charles Keith (Dean of Men and baseball coach). He hit .591 at Eastern during his last season. After graduating from Eastern, Combs went back to his native Owsley County and taught in one-room schoolhouses in both Ida May and Levi.

=== Early baseball career ===
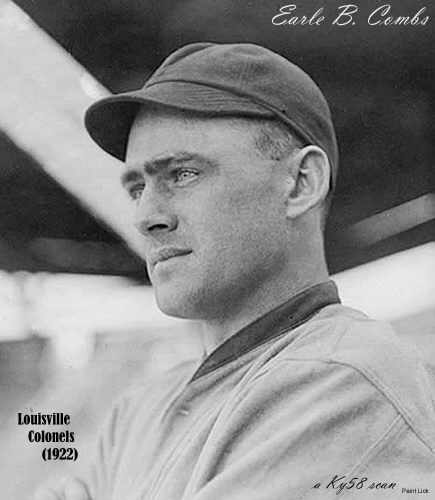
Combs with the Louisville Colonels

Combs continued to play baseball in his spare time. He played for High Splint (Harlan County coal company team) in the Pine Mountain League (summer of 1921) and hit .444. He also played semi-pro baseball for the Lexington, Kentucky based Lexington Reds of the Blue Grass League. It was in Lexington (in 1922) that Combs drew the attention of the Louisville Colonels of the American Association. After scouting him, Louisville offered him a contract which provided a salary that exceeded the $37 per month ($712 today) he made as a teacher in Owsley County.

His Louisville debut was unsettling; he committed several outfield errors. The last one gave the opposition the two runs they needed to win the game. Distraught afterward, Combs said, "As I went after the dropped ball I was tempted to keep right on going, climb the fence and not stop running until I got to Pebworth." He had married Ruth McCollum, his high school sweetheart, the year before and was concerned about his future.

Joe McCarthy, the manager of the Colonels and later his manager with the Yankees, knew what Combs could do and told him, "Look, if I didn't think you belonged in center field on this club I wouldn't put you there, and I'm going to keep you there." Combs soon found his stride, hitting .344 in 1922 and .380 in 1923 for the Colonels and also earning a reputation for speedy ball-hawking in the outfield and reckless base- stealing on offense.

=== Major league years ===
In 1924, the New York Yankees won a spirited bidding war and bought Combs' contract for $50,000 ($939,320 in current dollar terms). This was a rather large sum at that time, but it bore fruit for the Yankees as Combs proved an immediate success in New York. In his rookie season (summer of 1924), Combs played center field and hit .400 before breaking an ankle sliding into home plate at Cleveland's League Park on June 15. Except for one pinch-hitting appearance, he saw no more action that rookie season.

The following year, manager Miller Huggins made Combs the Yankees' leadoff hitter. He held this position for the remaining eleven years of his playing career. He hit .342 and scored 117 runs in 1925. In his best year (1927), he hit .356 with 231 hits, 131 runs scored, 36 doubles and a league-leading 23 triples. He led the league in triples again the next year, batting .310 and finishing sixth in Most Valuable Player voting. He hit .345 in 1929, then .344 in 1930, again leading the league in triples.

Combs suffered a serious accident in July 1934. On a 100+-degree day at St. Louis' Sportsman's Park, he crashed into the outfield wall going for a fly ball, sustaining a fractured skull, a broken shoulder and a damaged knee. He was reportedly near death for several days, and was hospitalized for more than two months. The next season, he attempted a comeback but suffered another serious injury. That injury, coupled with the knowledge that the Yankees were set to bring up a rookie center fielder named Joe DiMaggio the next season, led to Combs' decision to retire at the age of 36.

For his career Combs hit .325, had an on-base average of .397 and averaged nearly 200 hits, 75 walks and only 31 strikeouts a season. He was a part of three World Series championships (in 1927, 1928 and 1932). He also set the Yankees' team record for most triples in a season (23 in 1927). He hit no lower than .282 in any of his eleven seasons, and scored no fewer than 113 runs from 1925 through 1933. In four World Series, Combs hit .350 with a .443 on-base average. He averaged 17 triples a season, and had a lifetime fielding percentage seven points better than the league average.

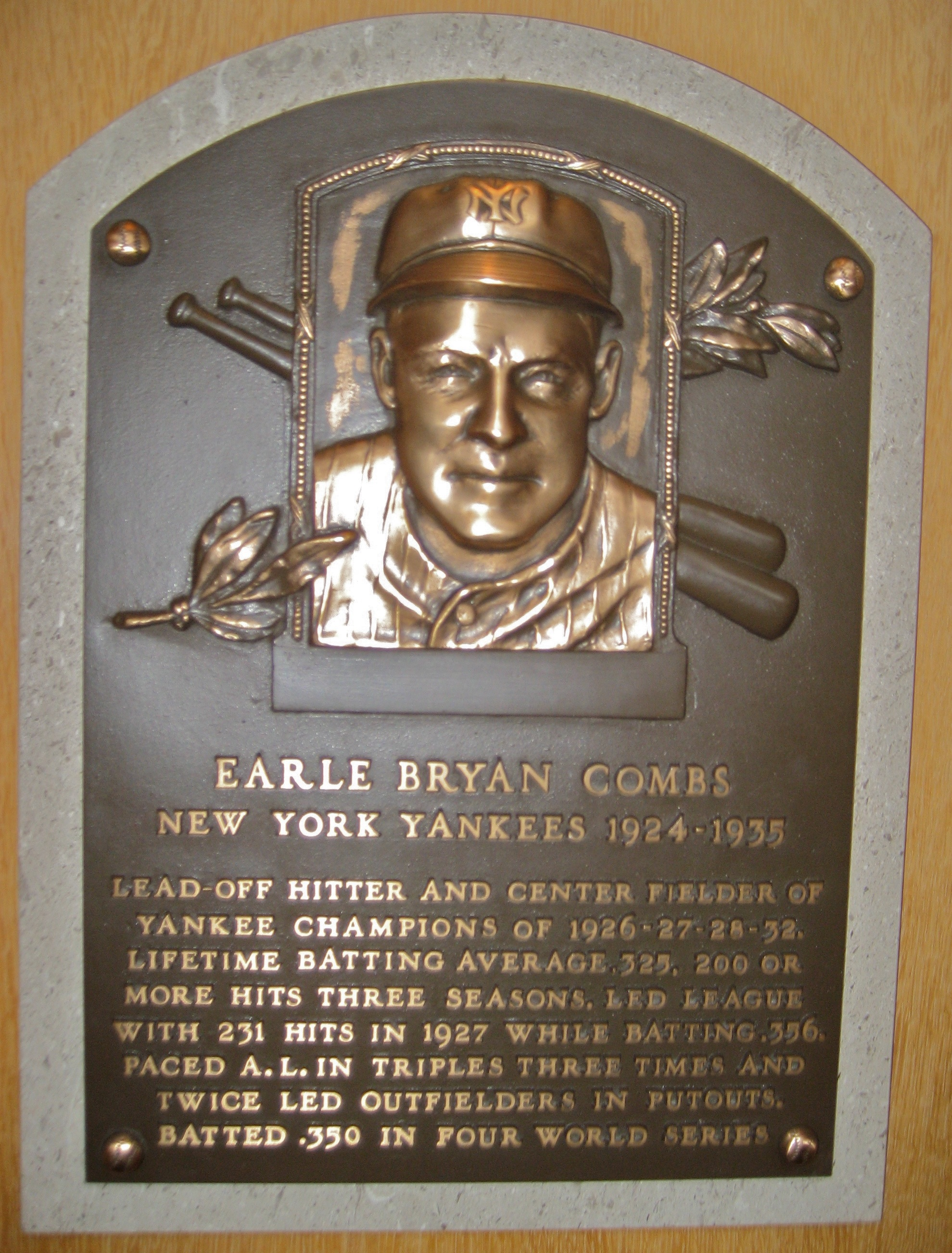
Combs' plaque in the Baseball Hall of Fame.

Miller Huggins once said, "If you had nine Combs' on your ball club, you could go to bed every night and sleep like a baby". Joe McCarthy (another longtime Yankee manager) said, "They wouldn't pay baseball managers much of a salary if they all presented as few problems as did Earle Combs." Said Babe Ruth: "Combs was more than a good ballplayer; he was always a first-class gentleman." American sportswriter and baseball historian Fred Lieb wrote of Combs, "If a vote were taken of the sportswriters as to who their favorite ballplayer on the Yankees would be, Combs would have been their choice."

After his retirement as a player, he remained in the game as a coach for almost two decades. He was offered a coaching job with the Yankees in 1936, and started his new position by instructing his replacement (DiMaggio) on the nuances of Yankee Stadium's outfield. He coached for the Yankees through 1944, for the St. Louis Browns in 1947 and for the Boston Red Sox (1948–1952). When he announced his retirement from the Boston coaching staff in March 1953, he said that he was going to spend more time with family and his Kentucky farm. He returned to coaching for the Philadelphia Phillies in 1954.

=== Life after baseball ===
After retiring from baseball in 1954, Combs returned to his 400-acre farm in Madison County. He served as the Kentucky state banking commissioner during Governor (and former Baseball Commissioner) A. B. 'Happy' Chandler's second administration (1955–1959), and on Eastern's Board of Regents (1959–1975). In November 1962, he laid the foundation stone for Earle B. Combs Hall, a dormitory at Eastern. In June 1970, the Little League field at Irvine-McDowell Park in Richmond was named in his honor. In 2006, he was inducted as a charter member of Eastern's Athletics Hall of Fame, and the university provides an athletic scholarship in his honor each year.

Combs was selected for induction into the Hall of Fame in 1970 by the Veterans Committee. When he learned of the honor, he said "I thought the Hall of Fame was for superstars, not just average players like me." Sabermetrician Bill James has listed Combs as one of ten examples of Hall of Fame inductees who do not deserve the honor.

Combs and his wife Ruth (1901–1989) had three sons, Earle Jr, Charles and Donald. After a long illness, he died on July 21, 1976, in Richmond, Kentucky at age 77. He is interred in the Richmond Cemetery.

=== Career statistics ===
Years	Games	PA	AB	R	H	2B	3B	HR	RBI	SB	BB	SO	AVG	OBP	SLG	FLD%
12	1455	6514	5746	1186	1866	309	154	58	633	98	670	278	.325	.397	.462	.974

Among all players who played a thousand games in the first fifty years of the 20th century, Combs and his .325 career batting average was 23rd best.

In four World Series covering 16 games (1926, 1927, 1928 and 1932), Combs batted .350 (21-for-60) with 17 runs, three doubles, one home run, 9 runs batted in, and 10 base on balls.

== See also ==
- List of Major League Baseball career triples leaders
- List of Major League Baseball career runs scored leaders
- List of Major League Baseball annual triples leaders
- List of Major League Baseball triples records
- List of Major League Baseball players who spent their entire career with one franchise

Sporting positions
Preceded by Larry Woodall	Boston Red Sox first-base coach 1948–1952	Succeeded by Del Baker
