= Arnett, Kentucky =

Unincorporated community in Kentucky, United States

Arnett
- Unincorporated community
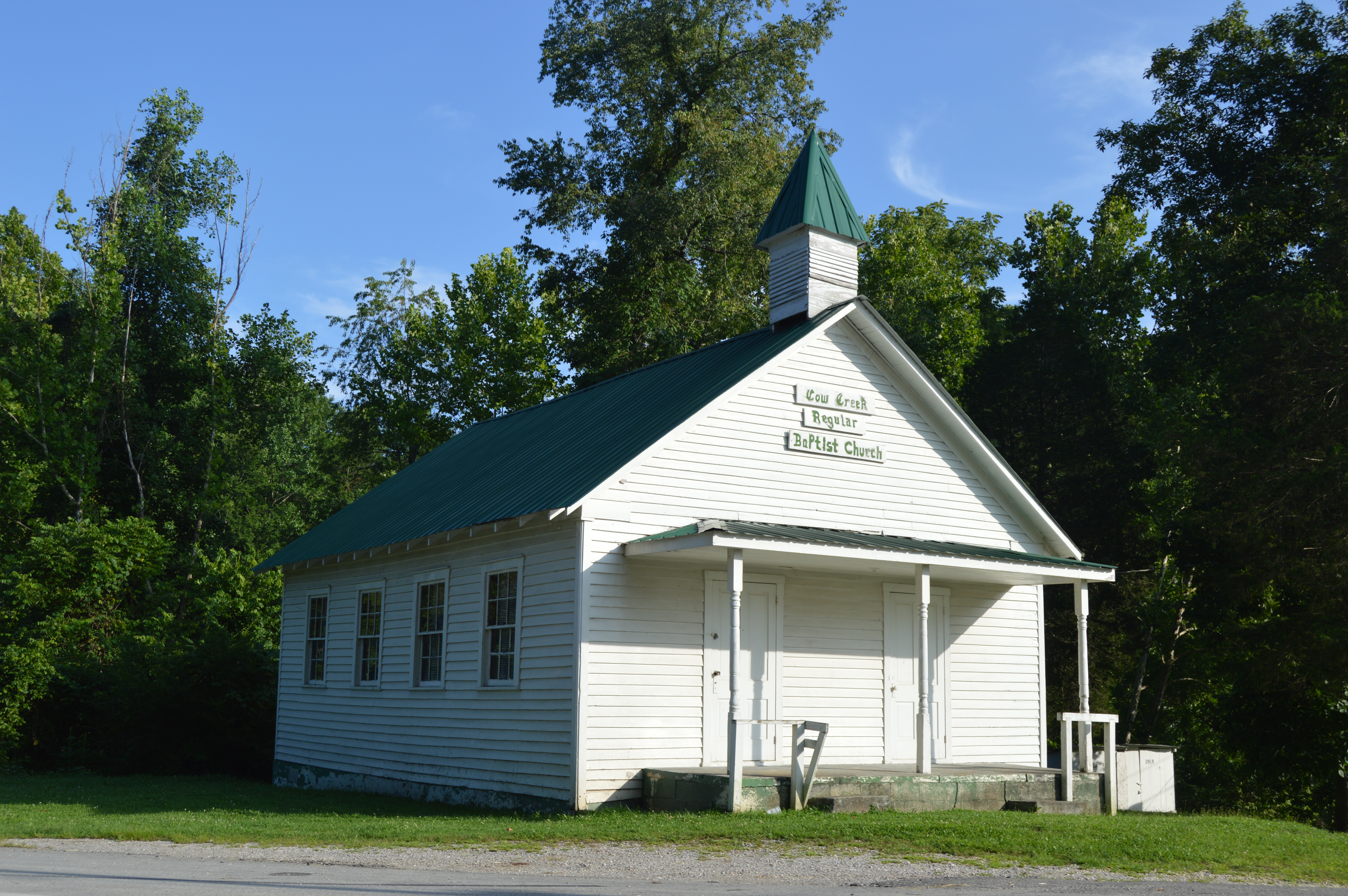
- Cow Creek Regular Baptist Church

- Location within the state of Kentucky Arnett (the United States)
- Coordinates: 37°24′37″N 83°34′7″W
- Country: United States
- State: Kentucky
- County: Owsley
- Elevation: 817 ft (249 m)
- Time zone: UTC-5 (Eastern (EST))
  - Summer (DST): UTC-4 (EDT)
- GNIS feature ID: 510299

Arnett is an unincorporated community located in Owsley County, Kentucky, United States. Its post office closed in February 1957.
