= Moyers Building =

- Moyers Buildings
- U.S. National Register of Historic Places
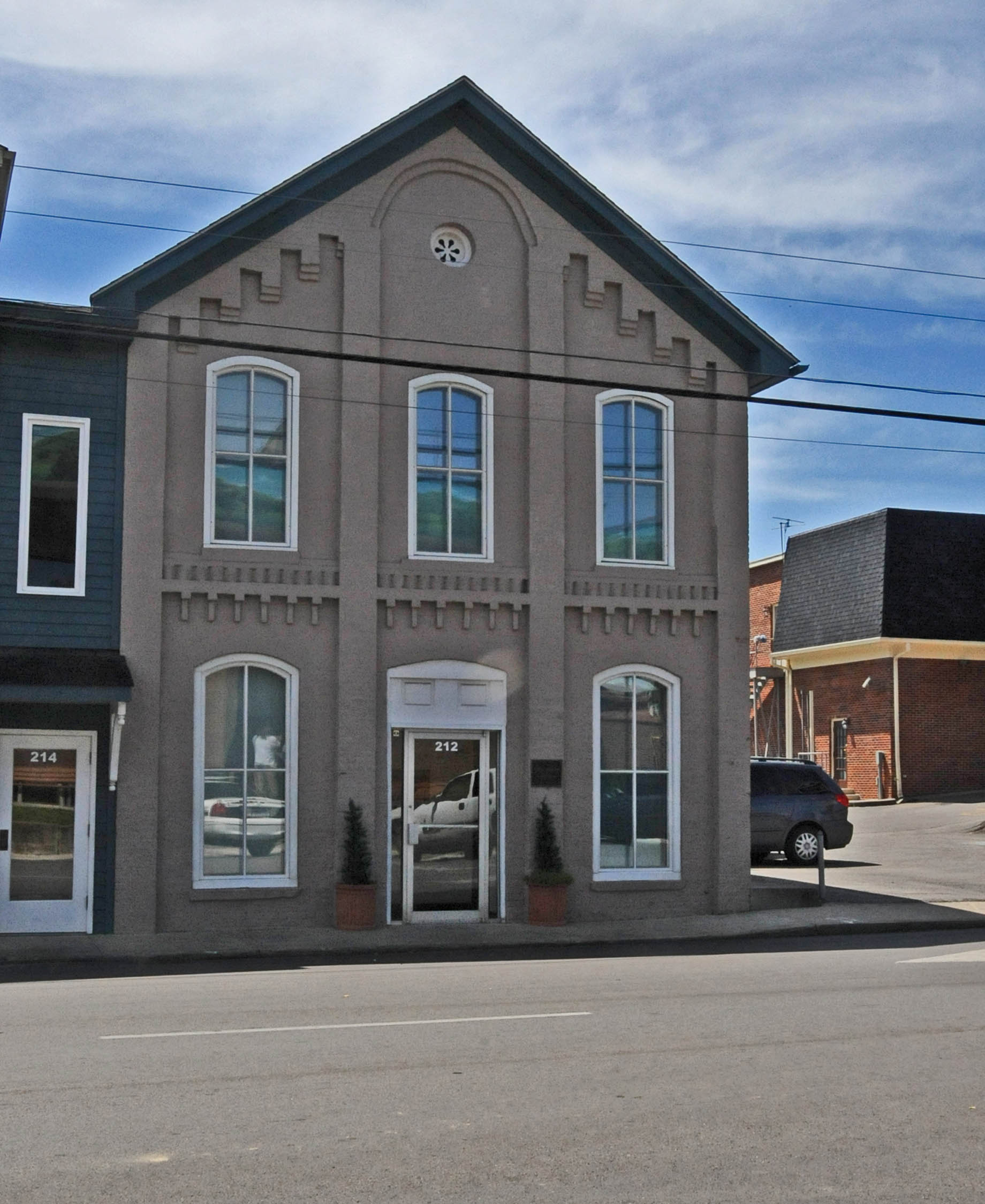

- Location within Kentucky Location within the United States
- Location: S. Court St., Booneville, Kentucky
- Coordinates: 37°28′32″N 83°40′31″W
- Area: less than one acre
- Built: 1888
- Built by: Moyers, B.G.
- NRHP reference No.: 82001575
- Added to NRHP: October 29, 1982

The Moyers Building, at S. Court St. in Booneville, Kentucky, was built in 1888. It was listed on the National Register of Historic Places in 1982.

It was built by B. G. Moyers, a merchant in Booneville, to serve as a general store. Its bricks were produced by a brick kiln that operated on the banks of Buck Creek.

Its 1982 NRHP nomination assessed it to be architecturally "the most elaborate structure in Booneville with a population of one hundred twenty-six, and the seat of government of Owsley County."
