= 2016 Oregon Democratic presidential primary =

- May 17, 2016

| Candidate | Bernie Sanders | Hillary Clinton |
| Home state | Vermont | New York |
| Delegate count | 36 | 25 |
| Popular vote | 360,829 | 269,846 |
| Percentage | 56.24% | 42.06% |
Election results by county.
Sanders
40 – 50%
50 – 60%
60 – 70%
Clinton
40 – 50%

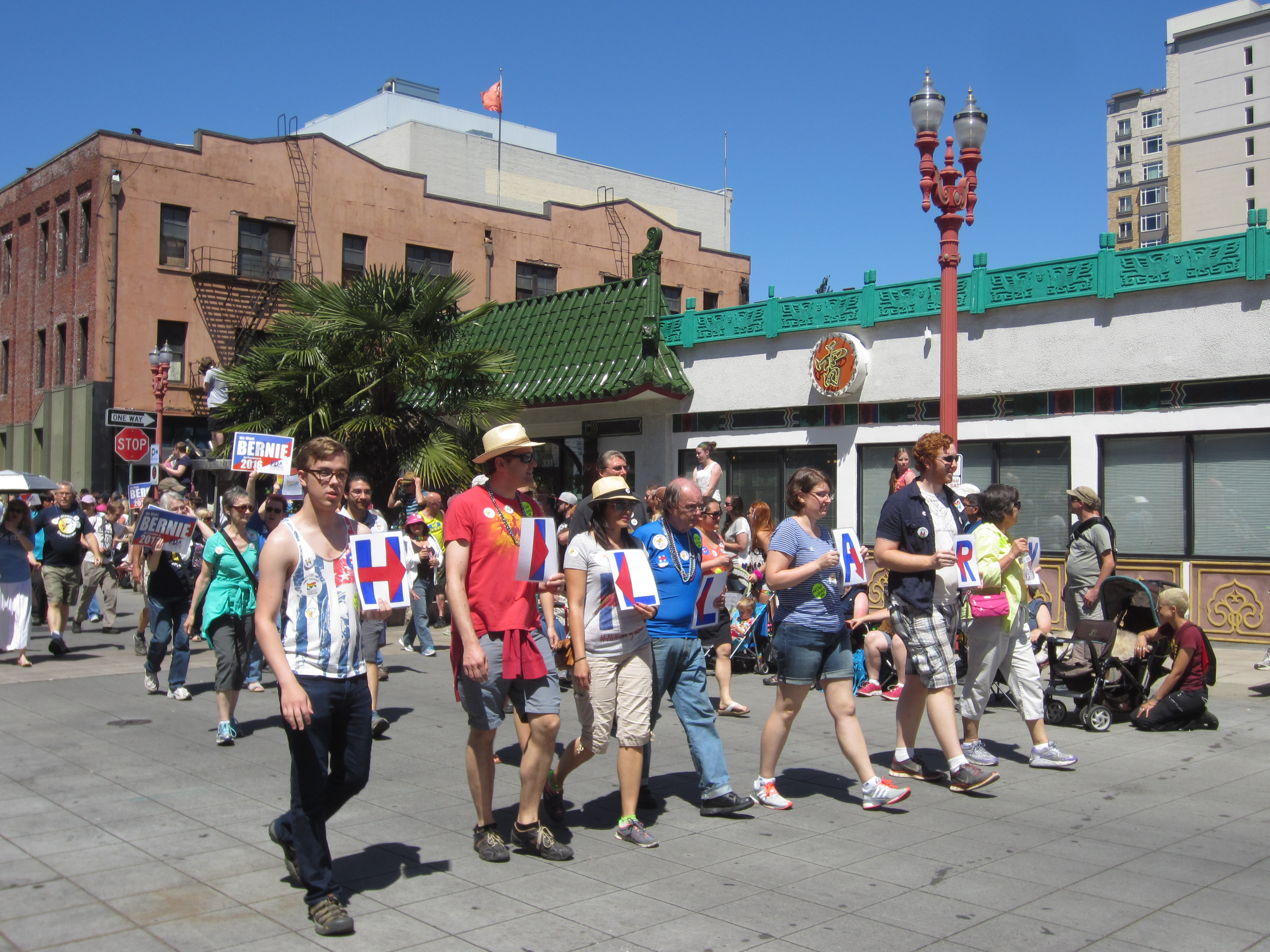
Supporters of both Clinton and Sanders at the 2015 Portland Pride Parade

The 2016 Oregon Democratic presidential primary was held on May 17 in the U.S. state of Oregon as one of the Democratic Party's primaries ahead of the 2016 presidential election.

On the same day, the Democratic Party held their Kentucky primary, while the Republican Party held their own Oregon primary on that day.

== Opinion polling ==
| Poll source | Date | 1st | 2nd | Other |
|---|---|---|---|---|
| Official Primary Results | May 17, 2016 | Bernie Sanders; 56.2% | Hillary Clinton; 42.1% | Misc. 1.7% |
| DHM Research Margin of error: ± 5.6% Sample size: 901 | May 6–9, 2016 | Hillary Clinton; 48% | Bernie Sanders; 33% | Others / Undecided; 19% |
| KATU-TV/SurveyUSA Margin of error: ± 4.0% Sample size: 630 | March 28-April 1, 2016 | Hillary Clinton; 37% | Bernie Sanders; 36% | Others / Undecided; 27% |
| DHM Research Margin of error: ± 7% Sample size: 206 | July 22–27, 2015 | Hillary Clinton; 44% | Bernie Sanders; 39% | Others / Undecided; 17% |

== Results ==
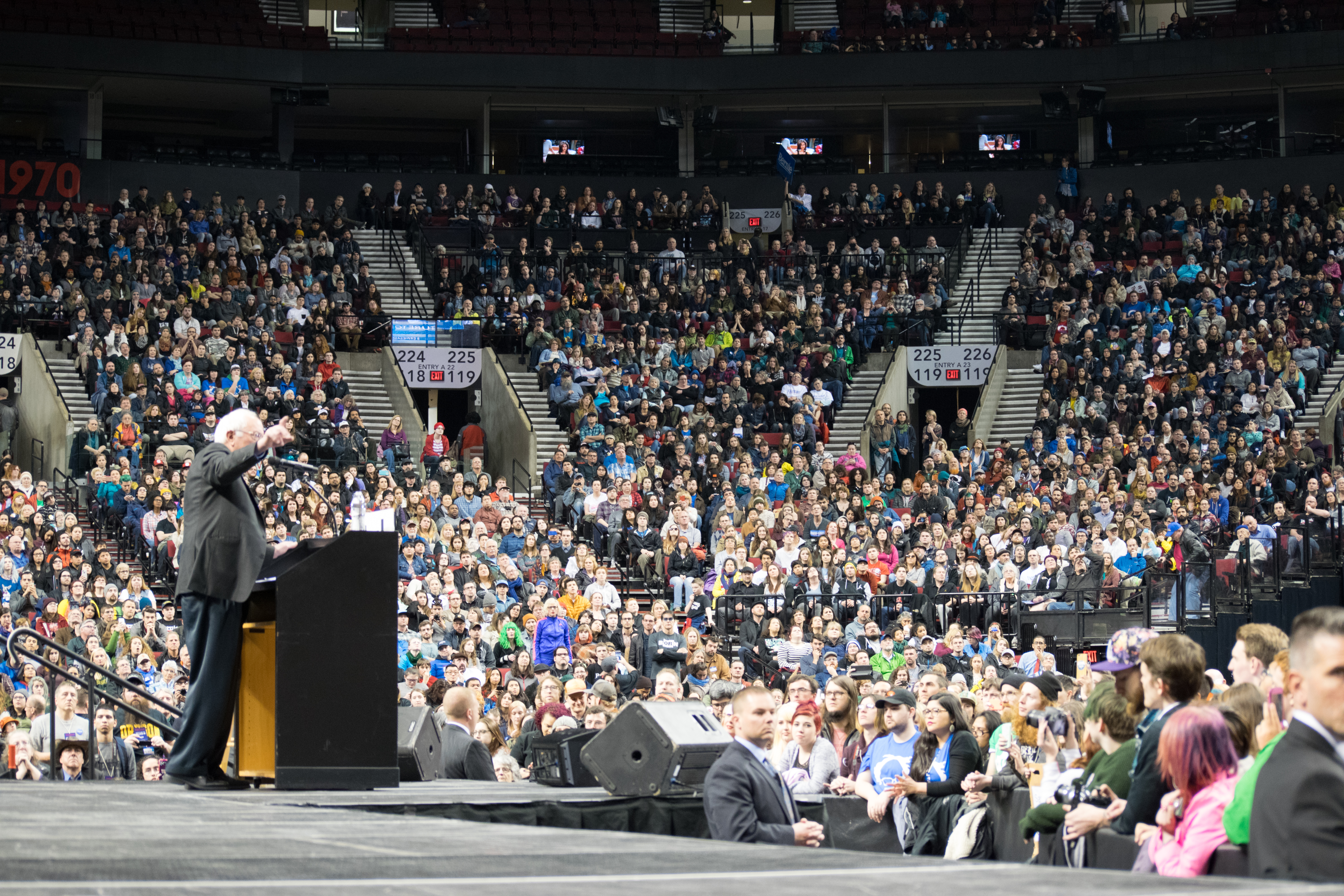
Bernie Sanders rally in Portland, Oregon, March 25, 2016.

Oregon Democratic primary, May 17, 2016
| Candidate | Popular vote | | Estimated delegates | | |
| Candidate | Count | Percentage | Pledged | Unpledged | Total |
|---|---|---|---|---|---|
| Bernie Sanders | 360,829 | 56.24% | 36 | 3 | 39 |
| Hillary Clinton | 269,846 | 42.06% | 25 | 7 | 32 |
| Misc. | 10,920 | 1.70% | 0 | 0 | 0 |
| (available) | —N/a | | 0 | 3 | 3 |
| Total | 641,595 | 100% | 61 | 13 | 74 |

== Analysis ==
As Barack Obama had done against Hillary Clinton in the state eight years earlier, Sanders won a convincing double-digit victory in Oregon, as he tried to breathe new life into his campaign. Massive grassroots support across the state helped the progressive and populist candidate achieve a double-digit win in a state with a closed primary. Sanders swept all counties in the state but one. He won a large victory in populous Portland in Multnomah County, where the bulk of the vote came from. He also was buoyed by support from the capital city of Salem in Marion County. Sanders swept all of the other major cities as well, including Eugene, Bend, and Medford, and likewise performed strongly in most of the rural and remote counties of the state, including those of Central Oregon and in the Oregon high desert bordering Idaho from the west. Sanders performed well in areas that were diverse in ethnicity as well as those which were less diverse. In fact, some of his largest margins of victory came from areas with a greater ethnic diversity in the state, such as Portland or Hillsboro, Oregon.

Clinton only won one county, Gilliam County, by one vote.

== See also ==
- 2016 Oregon Republican presidential primary
