= Stay, Kentucky =

Unincorporated community in Kentucky, United States

Stay
- Unincorporated community
- Location within the state of Kentucky Stay (the United States)
- Coordinates: 37°30′37″N 83°39′8″W
- Country: United States
- State: Kentucky
- County: Owsley
- Elevation: 771 ft (235 m)
- Time zone: UTC-5 (Eastern (EST))
  - Summer (DST): UTC-4 (EDT)
- GNIS feature ID: 515672

Stay is an unincorporated community located in Owsley County, Kentucky, United States.
