= Major, Kentucky =

Unincorporated community in Kentucky, United States

Major
- Unincorporated community
- Location within the state of Kentucky Major (the United States)
- Coordinates: 37°24′50″N 83°41′55″W
- Country: United States
- State: Kentucky
- County: Owsley
- Elevation: 774 ft (236 m)
- Time zone: UTC-5 (Eastern (EST))
  - Summer (DST): UTC-4 (EDT)
- GNIS feature ID: 513764

Major is an unincorporated community located in Owsley County, Kentucky, United States. Its post office is open.
