= Island City, Kentucky =

Unincorporated community in Kentucky, United States

Island City
- Unincorporated community
- Location within the state of Kentucky Island City (the United States)
- Coordinates: 37°21′59″N 83°46′5″W
- Country: United States
- State: Kentucky
- County: Owsley
- Elevation: 837 ft (255 m)
- Time zone: UTC-6 (Central (CST))
  - Summer (DST): UTC-5 (CST)
- ZIP codes: 41338
- GNIS feature ID: 512934

Island City is an unincorporated community located in Owsley County, Kentucky, United States. Island City is located at the junction of KY 1503 and KY 1350.
