= Irvine-McDowell Park =

Irvine-McDowell Park is a 20-acre city park located in Richmond, Kentucky. The park includes a playground, picnic shelter, tennis courts, an outdoor basketball court and four softball and baseball fields. Earle Combs Field used to be located there. Located at 345 Lancaster Avenue in Richmond, the park occupies the grounds of Irvinton House. The two-story Federal brick residence was built in the 1820s for Dr. Anthony Wayne Rollins. It was purchased in 1829 by David Irvine (1796–1872). Irvine gave the property to his daughter, Elizabeth Shelby Irvine, after her marriage to her cousin William McClanahan Irvine in 1849.

Upon Elizabeth Irvine's death in 1920, the property (including antiques, family portraits, and furnishings) were willed to the Kentucky Medical Society for a hospital as a memorial to Dr. Ephraim McDowell, the famous pioneer surgeon. For many years, Irvinton served as one of four United States hospitals for the treatment of trachoma. After the hospital closed in 1950, Irvinton and its grounds were donated to the city of Richmond and became its first official recreation center. The park was named Irvine-McDowell in honor of the Irvine family and Dr. McDowell.

Irvinton House currently houses the Richmond Tourism and Main Street Department Welcome Center. The Irvinton House Museum is also located in the historic home and serves as a local history center.
