= 2016 Kentucky Democratic presidential primary =

- May 17, 2016

Candidate	Hillary Clinton	Bernie Sanders	Uncommitted
Home state	New York	Vermont	N/A
Delegate count	28	27	3
Popular vote	212,534	210,623	24,104
Percentage	46.76%	46.33%	5.30%
Election results by county.
Clinton
40 – 50%
50 – 60%
Sanders
40 – 50%
50 – 60%
60 – 70%

The 2016 Kentucky Democratic presidential primary was held on May 17 in the U.S. state of Kentucky as one of the Democratic Party's primaries ahead of the 2016 presidential election.

On the same day, the Democratic Party held their Oregon primary. The Republican Party held their Kentucky caucuses in early March.

== Opinion polling ==
List of polls
Main article: Kentucky Democratic primary, 2016

Delegate count: 55 Pledged, 5 Unpledged Winner: Hillary Clinton
Primary date: May 17, 2016

Poll source	Date	1st	2nd	3rd	Other
Official Primary results	May 17, 2016	Hillary Clinton; 46.8%	Bernie Sanders; 46.3%		Others / Uncommitted; 6.9%
Public Policy Polling Margin of error: ± 4.4% Sample size: 501	March 1–2, 2016	Hillary Clinton; 43%	Bernie Sanders; 38%		Others / Undecided; 19%
Public Policy Polling Margin of error: ± 4% Sample size: 610	June 18–21, 2015	Hillary Clinton; 56%	Bernie Sanders; 12%	Jim Webb; 7%	Lincoln Chafee 5%, Martin O'Malley 3%, Not sure 18%

== Results ==
Kentucky Democratic primary, May 17, 2016
Candidate	Popular vote		Estimated delegates		
Candidate	Count	Percentage	Pledged	Unpledged	Total
Hillary Clinton	212,534	46.76%	28	2	30
Bernie Sanders	210,623	46.33%	27	0	27
Martin O'Malley (withdrawn)	5,713	1.26%			
Roque "Rocky" De La Fuente	1,594	0.35%			
Uncommitted	24,104	5.30%	0	3	3
Total	454,568	100%	55	5	60

=== Results by county ===
County	Clinton	Votes	Sanders	Votes
Adair	49.6%	466	43.7%	410
Allen	46.0%	427	47.4%	440
Anderson	36.0%	1,132	52.4%	1,649
Ballard	32.0%	405	52.0%	659
Barren	37.2%	1,979	49.9%	2,653
Bath	45.6%	628	46.6%	641
Bell	44.7%	567	45.6%	578
Boone	51.8%	2,932	44.1%	2,496
Bourbon	46.5%	1,109	45.6%	1,087
Boyd	44.7%	2,193	46.1%	2,262
Boyle	49.9%	1,648	43.9%	1,451
Bracken	32.5%	251	54.9%	424
Breathitt	33.9%	1,123	51.8%	1,716
Breckinridge	45.9%	877	45.8%	875
Bullitt	44.4%	2,907	49.1%	3,210
Butler	51.1%	238	42.1%	196
Caldwell	34.3%	570	52.1%	866
Calloway	35.8%	1,460	55.0%	2,239
Campbell	48.1%	3,169	47.5%	3,133
Carlisle	25.6%	206	57.5%	462
Carroll	41.5%	481	49.4%	573
Carter	39.1%	800	51.4%	1,051
Casey	50.7%	210	44.0%	182
Christian	50.2%	2,437	39.9%	1,936
Clark	45.5%	1,810	47.5%	1,888
Clay	48.4%	184	41.6%	158
Clinton	57.9%	151	35.6%	93
Crittenden	35.6%	240	51.0%	344
Cumberland	44.8%	78	50.0%	87
Daviess	45.5%	5,066	46.6%	5,188
Edmonson	49.5%	275	47.1%	262
Elliott	35.7%	301	52.6%	443
Estill	47.6%	446	47.0%	440
Fayette	52.8%	20,014	45.0%	17,048
Fleming	40.7%	627	52.3%	806
Floyd	31.4%	2,327	54.1%	4,010
Franklin	45.1%	5,218	46.6%	5,398
Fulton	46.6%	315	36.2%	245
Gallatin	39.5%	260	51.6%	340
Garrard	50.5%	434	45.0%	387
Grant	40.9%	594	49.2%	715
Graves	31.8%	1,631	51.3%	2,631
Grayson	49.9%	705	44.6%	630
Green	40.4%	284	51.2%	360
Greenup	43.8%	1,517	47.7%	1,655
Hancock	42.5%	491	49.7%	573
Hardin	47.8%	4,359	46.2%	4,208
Harlan	25.9%	451	62.8%	1,092
Harrison	41.4%	886	49.5%	1,059
Hart	39.7%	817	51.6%	1,062
Henderson	43.4%	2,887	42.9%	2,850
Henry	40.6%	781	49.8%	958
Hickman	32.5%	209	46.6%	300
Hopkins	32.7%	1,690	52.2%	2,696
Jackson	35.9%	78	59.0%	128
Jefferson	57.3%	64,090	40.3%	45,048
Jessamine	44.2%	1,875	49.8%	2,113
Johnson	32.9%	444	55.5%	749
Kenton	49.0%	5,146	46.5%	4,880
Knott	30.8%	583	58.8%	1,114
Knox	47.9%	520	46.4%	504
LaRue	34.7%	612	51.6%	910
Laurel	49.1%	845	45.9%	791
Lawrence	35.3%	444	52.4%	659
Lee	42.9%	199	48.3%	224
Leslie	43.8%	64	52.7%	77
Letcher	26.7%	838	56.9%	1,788
Lewis	51.7%	211	37.0%	151
Lincoln	47.7%	779	45.5%	742
Livingston	34.4%	400	52.4%	610
Logan	43.8%	1,077	46.0%	1,131
Lyon	40.5%	497	45.7%	561
Madison	41.6%	3,441	53.0%	4,385
Magoffin	42.7%	511	52.3%	626
Marion	50.3%	1,162	42.6%	983
Marshall	34.7%	1,577	50.8%	2,308
Martin	31.2%	104	57.4%	191
Mason	44.1%	727	47.0%	775
McCracken	43.8%	3,334	46.5%	3,541
McCreary	41.9%	169	50.4%	203
McLean	38.1%	477	50.1%	628
Meade	41.9%	1,312	49.2%	1,541
Menifee	44.8%	311	46.5%	323
Mercer	39.1%	988	52.6%	1,331
Metcalfe	41.7%	506	47.9%	582
Monroe	50.8%	126	44.0%	109
Montgomery	45.8%	1,289	47.0%	1,322
Morgan	31.6%	544	57.3%	988
Muhlenberg	43.3%	1,544	45.7%	1,632
Nelson	47.6%	2,395	46.6%	2,345
Nicholas	42.2%	353	50.2%	420
Ohio	41.3%	778	50.0%	943
Oldham	52.4%	2,730	44.4%	2,315
Owen	34.6%	453	55.0%	720
Owsley	43.3%	77	51.1%	91
Pendleton	36.6%	388	51.5%	546
Perry	30.0%	839	59.6%	1,666
Pike	26.1%	2,335	54.3%	4,848
Powell	42.4%	623	50.7%	744
Pulaski	47.4%	1,169	46.6%	1,148
Robertson	32.0%	95	59.6%	177
Rockcastle	45.7%	238	48.8%	254
Rowan	44.0%	1,170	51.2%	1,363
Russell	48.2%	343	46.7%	332
Scott	48.6%	2,505	46.4%	2,394
Shelby	47.8%	2,195	44.5%	2,044
Simpson	45.9%	708	45.1%	695
Spencer	42.7%	673	51.2%	806
Taylor	50.3%	949	44.8%	844
Todd	35.1%	333	53.5%	507
Trigg	40.8%	604	48.3%	715
Trimble	38.3%	415	50.0%	542
Union	29.9%	672	49.3%	1,106
Warren	44.9%	4,829	49.9%	5,365
Washington	47.0%	601	45.5%	582
Wayne	55.6%	502	39.4%	356
Webster	28.7%	693	48.5%	1,169
Whitley	52.5%	522	41.1%	409
Wolfe	42.1%	414	50.7%	499
Woodford	46.3%	1,862	47.7%	1,918
Total	46.8%	212,550	46.3%	210,626

== Analysis ==
Clinton's strength with conservative white voters in the Appalachia region, including Coal Country, had clearly regressed since 2008; she had beaten Barack Obama 65–29 in Kentucky eight years earlier, and only beat rival Bernie Sanders 47–46 in 2016. She ran strongly in Louisville, where the African American population is highest, but lost many of the Eastern Kentucky Coalfield counties in the state to Bernie Sanders, who had won a large victory in neighboring West Virginia the week prior. Sanders also won many counties in the Jackson Purchase area. Notably, in 2012, almost all of the Sanders counties voted for the "Uncommitted" ballot option in a protest vote against Obama.
