= Whoopflarea, Kentucky =

Unincorporated community in Kentucky, United States

Whoopflarea
- Unincorporated community
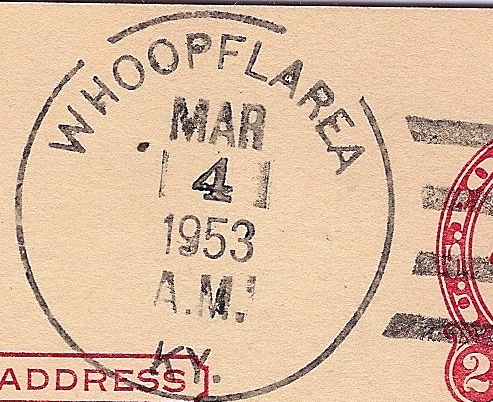
- Postmark from Whoopflarea, Kentucky

- Location within the state of Kentucky Whoopflarea (the United States)
- Coordinates: 37°17′52″N 83°34′5″W
- Country: United States
- State: Kentucky
- County: Owsley
- Elevation: 971 ft (296 m)
- Time zone: UTC-5 (Eastern (EST))
  - Summer (DST): UTC-4 (EDT)
- GNIS feature ID: 516350

Whoopflarea is an unincorporated community located in Owsley County, Kentucky, United States. Its post office closed in April 1954. Whoopflarea has been noted for its unusual place name.

The town name has several proposed origins. The most accepted is the whoop of owls made in the remote area. Other suggested origins include a search for lost persons in the area' according to this etymology, the community's name comes from the fact that searchers literally "whooped" for someone called Larry or Laura.
