= Blake, Kentucky =

Unincorporated community in Kentucky, United States

Blake
- Unincorporated community
- Location within the state of Kentucky Blake (the United States)
- Coordinates: 37°23′13″N 83°44′21″W
- Country: United States
- State: Kentucky
- County: Owsley
- Elevation: 823 ft (251 m)
- Time zone: UTC-5 (Eastern (EST))
  - Summer (DST): UTC-4 (EDT)
- GNIS feature ID: 510775

Blake is an unincorporated community located in Owsley County, Kentucky, United States. Its post office is closed.
