= Pebworth, Kentucky =

Unincorporated community in Kentucky, United States

Pebworth
- Unincorporated community
- Location within the state of Kentucky Pebworth (the United States)
- Coordinates: 37°30′15″N 83°43′52″W
- Country: United States
- State: Kentucky
- County: Owsley
- Elevation: 902 ft (275 m)
- Time zone: UTC-5 (Eastern (EST))
  - Summer (DST): UTC-5 (EST)
- ZIP codes: 41359
- GNIS feature ID: 514474

Pebworth is an unincorporated community located in Owsley County, Kentucky, United States. Its post office closed in April 1992.

Pebworth started as a post office run out of the house of the first postmaster, John W. Handy, in southern Lee County, 13 September 1887. John C Smallwood was appointed to replace him, 21 July 1895. Later that year, on 29 October 1895, Smallwood was replaced by Stephen H. Handy, father of the first postmaster. Stephen Handy lived a few miles south, in Owsley County, so the post office was transferred to Owsley County, 14 November 1895.
