= Booneville, Kentucky =

- City
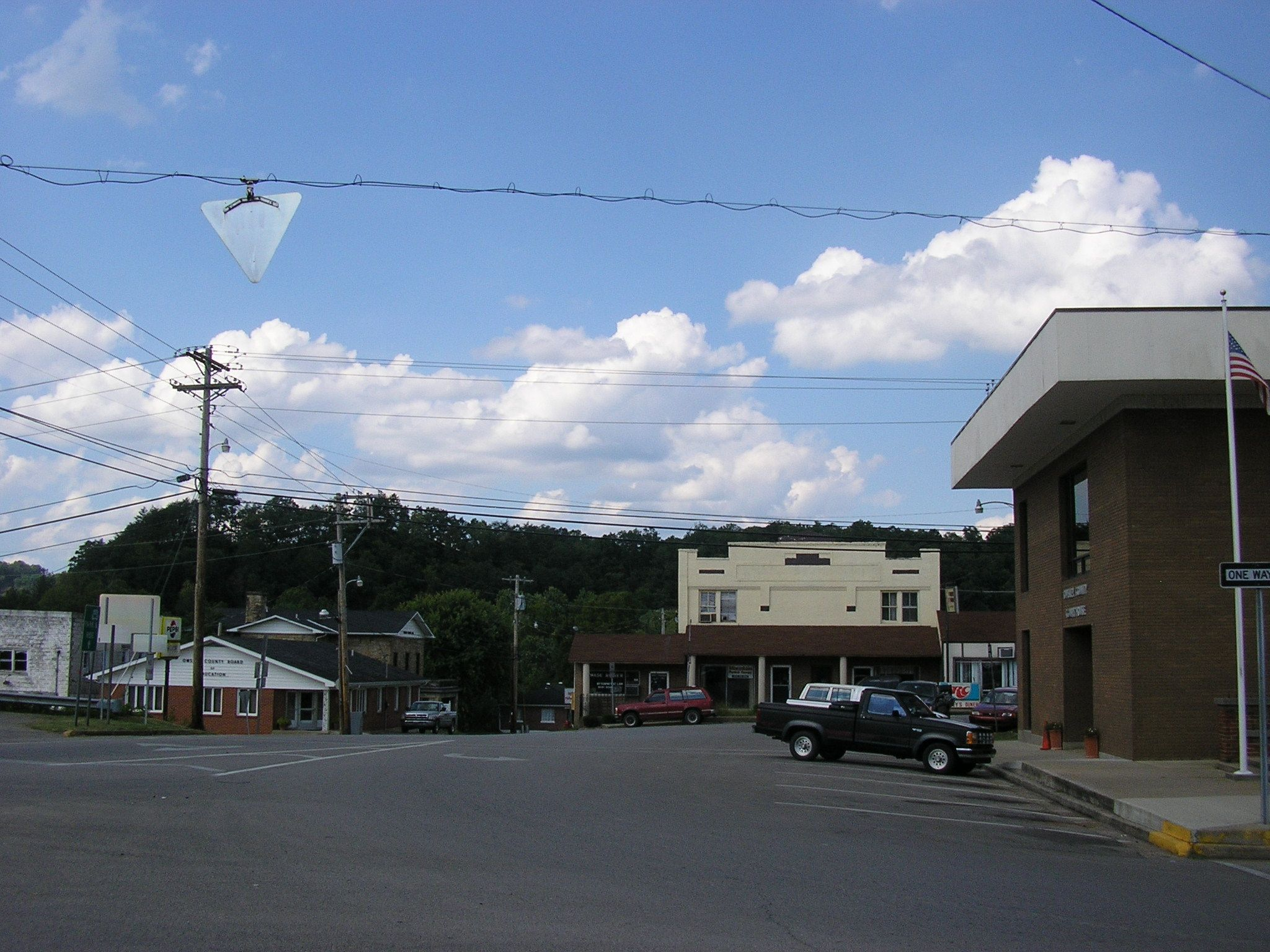
- Central Booneville, with the courthouse to the right

- Location of Booneville in Owsley County, Kentucky.
- Coordinates: 37°28′29″N 83°40′36″W
- Country: United States
- State: Kentucky
- County: Owsley
- Incorporated: March 1, 1847

Government
  - Type: City Commission
  - Mayor: Nelson Bobrowski

Area
  - Total: 1.47 sq mi (3.82 km^{2})
  - Land: 1.45 sq mi (3.75 km^{2})
  - Water: 0.031 sq mi (0.08 km^{2})
- Elevation: 709 ft (216 m)

Population (2020)
  - Total: 168
  - Density: 116.1/sq mi (44.82/km^{2})
- Time zone: UTC-5 (Eastern (EST))
  - Summer (DST): UTC-4 (EDT)
- ZIP code: 41314
- Area code: 606
- FIPS code: 21-08614
- GNIS feature ID: 0510852
- Website: City of Booneville

Booneville is a home rule-class city in Owsley County, Kentucky, in the United States. The population was 168 at the 2020 census. It is the county seat of Owsley County. It is located at the junction of Kentucky Route 11 and Kentucky Route 30 on the South Fork of the Kentucky River.

== History ==
The town was originally named Moore's Station after its chief landowner. It was renamed Boone's Station and then Booneville in honor of the American frontiersman, Daniel Boone. The town, consisting at the time of little more than a temporary log courthouse, became the county seat when Owsley County was formed on May 20, 1844. From this, the settlement was also sometimes known as Owsley Court House around this time. It was formally incorporated as a city by the state assembly on March 1, 1847. During the Civil War, Booneville was a crossroads for various Union and Confederate regiments, and was threatened by Confederate guerrillas, but avoided the destruction that befell some other county seats of Kentucky during the war.

The Moyers Building in Boonesville was added to the National Register of Historic Places in 1982.

== Geography ==
According to the United States Census Bureau, the city has a total area of 0.6 square miles (1.6 km^{2}), all land.

== Demographics ==
Historical population
Census	Pop.	Note	%±
1860	121		—
1870	111		−8.3%
1880	201		81.1%
1900	251		—
1910	236		−6.0%
1920	243		3.0%
1930	250		2.9%
1940	283		13.2%
1950	165		−41.7%
1960	143		−13.3%
1970	126		−11.9%
1980	191		51.6%
1990	232		21.5%
2000	143		−38.4%
2010	135		−5.6%
2020	168		24.4%
U.S. Decennial Census

As of the 2010 United States census, there were 81 people living in the city. The racial makeup of the city was 100.0% White.

As of the census of 2000, there were 111 people, 50 households, and 36 families living in the city. The population density was 176.2 inhabitants per square mile (68.0/km^{2}). There were 56 housing units at an average density of 88.9 per square mile (34.3/km^{2}). The racial makeup of the city was 99.10% White, and 0.90% from two or more races.

There were 50 households, out of which 26.0% had children under the age of 18 living with them, 60.0% were married couples living together, 12.0% had a female householder with no husband present, and 28.0% were non-families. 28.0% of all households were made up of individuals, and 16.0% had someone living alone who was 65 years of age or older. The average household size was 2.22 and the average family size was 2.67.

In the city, the population was spread out, with 18.9% under the age of 18, 6.3% from 18 to 24, 24.3% from 25 to 44, 29.7% from 45 to 64, and 20.7% who were 65 years of age or older. The median age was 45 years. For every 100 females, there were 91.4 males. For every 100 females age 18 and over, there were 95.7 males.

The median income for a household in the city was $15,833, and the median income for a family was $17,500. Males had a median income of $36,250 versus $31,250 for females. The per capita income for the city was $8,252. There were 40.0% of families and 57.6% of the population living below the poverty line, including 92.7% of under eighteen and 11.8% of those over 64.

== Government and politics ==
Mayor Charles E. Long, in office from 1959 to his death in 2019, was one of the longest-serving mayors in US history.

== Education ==
Booneville has a lending library, the Owsley County Public Library.
