= Owsley County, Kentucky =

County in Kentucky, United States

- County
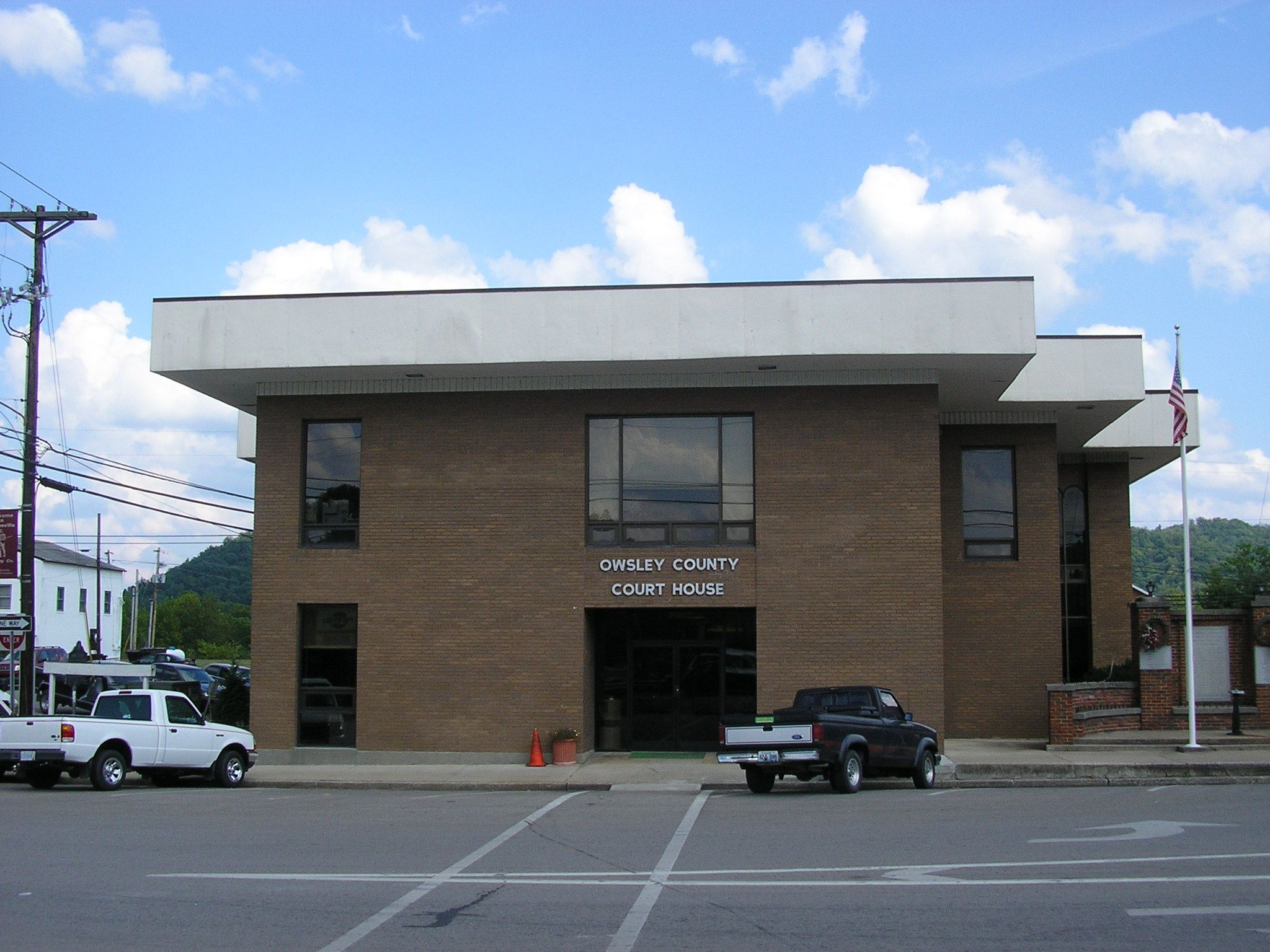
- Owsley County courthouse in Booneville

- Location within the U.S. state of Kentucky
- Coordinates: 37°25′N 83°41′W
- Country: United States
- State: Kentucky
- Founded: 1843
- Named for: William Owsley
- Seat: Booneville
- Largest city: Booneville

Government
  - Judge/Executive: Zeke Little Jr. (R)

Area
  - Total: 198 sq mi (510 km^{2})
  - Land: 197 sq mi (510 km^{2})
  - Water: 0.9 sq mi (2.3 km^{2}) 0.4%

Population (2020)
  - Total: 4,051
  - Estimate (2025): 3,932 ▼
  - Density: 20.6/sq mi (7.94/km^{2})
- Time zone: UTC−5 (Eastern)
  - Summer (DST): UTC−4 (EDT)
- Congressional district: 5th
- Website: https://owsley.countyclerk.us/

Owsley County is a county located in the Eastern Coalfield region of the U.S. state of Kentucky. As of the 2020 census, the population was 4,051, making it the second-least populous county in Kentucky. The county seat is Booneville. The county was organized on January 23, 1843, from Clay, Estill, and Breathitt counties and named for William Owsley (1782–1862), the judge of the Kentucky Court of Appeals and Governor of Kentucky (1844–48). According to the 2010 census reports, Owsley County has the second-highest level of child poverty of any county in the United States. In terms of income per household, the county is the poorest in the nation. Between 1980 and 2014, the rate of death from cancer in the county increased by 45.6 percent, the largest such increase of any county in the United States.

== History ==
Owsley County was formed in 1843 from portions of Clay, Breathitt, and Estill Counties and was named for Governor William Owsley. Owsley County was Kentucky's 96th county. Parts of Owsley County were used to form Jackson County in 1858 and Lee County in 1870.

The first settlers in Owsley County were John Renty Baker and John Abner. They settled there in about 1780 near the present Clay County line at Courtland. A gravestone in a cemetery on Upper Buffalo Creek reads, "Milly, wife of John Abner, died March 1846."

John Renty Baker and his sons, all of them gunsmiths, invented and developed hand-operated machines to rifle the barrels. John Renty Baker's father, Robert Baker, is sometimes credited with developing the firearm known as the "Kentucky Rifle".

John Renty Baker was one of the "Longhunters", spending more than a year at a time in the hunting and trapping in the forests of Kentucky and Tennessee. According to "The Conquest of the Old Southwest", Baker hunted in Kentucky in 1766 with Daniel Boone's brother-in-law, John Stewart. He lived on the Green River among the Cherokees and made trips down the Cumberland River to Spanish Natchez to sell furs.

After the death of his wife, Baker became a recluse and lived in a rock house (rockshelter) near the mouth of Buffalo Creek, where he died in 1820. He was the father of at least 21 children, who are documented.

The Baker family is the source of many stories. They were involved in one of the longest and bloodiest family feuds in U.S. history, which began in 1843 when Dr. Thomas Baker (a grandson of Julius Bob Baker) shot John Bales. Dr. Baker and Bales had both married to daughters of John White, and the couples became more intimate than was usual in the mountain country. Dr. Baker was insanely jealous of his wife and Bales. In a fit of rage, he abandoned his wife and filed for divorce, although he later withdrew it. Baker and Bales worked at a salt works in Manchester, and one day Baker called Bales to the door and shot him with his pepper-box pistol. As he lay dying, Bales cursed Baker and ordered $10,000 from his estate to be used for to capture and convict him. The family feud lasted for 59 years and eventually cost more than 100 lives.

The first settler of Booneville was James Moore Sr. His home was just outside of Booneville, in front of today's Booneville Homes apartments. Moore's son, James Jr., built a two-room cabin across the river from his parents. This cabin still exists, though it has been enlarged and remodeled through the years. It is currently owned by Booneville's mayor, Charles Long.

James Moores' land included all of Booneville, extending east across the South Fork River and towards Lerose. The community was originally known as Moore's Station, but it was renamed Booneville (for Daniel Boone) when it was incorporated in 1846. James Moore Jr. was the first postmaster. When the county was formed in 1843, Elias Moore donated the land for its seat. The post office opened in 1844. Owsley County lost part of its territory to Jackson County in 1858, and two years later lost more to Wolfe County. In 1870, Lee County was formed, and Owsley County was reduced to its present size.

The first permanent settlers of Owsley County were the Moore, Bowman, Baker, Gabbard, and Reynolds families. Most land patents came from Virginia, which Kentucky was once a part of. These were issued for military service, settlement or preemption, and for warrants from the treasury. Some families even today live on their original land grants.

The original courthouse burned to the ground January 1929, destroying all of Owsley County's early records. Fire struck again on January 5, 1967, seriously damaging the replacement court house.

== Alcohol prohibition ==
Although 97% of communities within the U.S. allow the legal sale of alcohol, until a 2013 election, Owsley County was a "dry county" that prohibited the sale of alcohol. This included the City of Booneville, the county seat. County voters had repeatedly rejected the repeal of alcohol prohibition laws enacted in 1920. This ended on March 6, 2013, when a majority of county voters voted to designate the county "wet". The vote was 632 "wet", 518 "dry". This permitted the sale of alcohol once the fiscal court had set ordinances to regulate the distribution of alcoholic beverages. Even though the sale of alcohol had long been forbidden, its consumption has been legal since 1933, when the Twenty-first Amendment was implemented.

As was typical, drunk driving during Owsley's time as a dry county was more of a problem than in wet counties, due to the necessity of driving the long distances necessary to buy legally sold alcohol. A 2003 study in Kentucky suggested that residents of dry counties have to drive farther from their homes to consume alcohol, which resulted in increased impaired driving.

== Geography ==
According to the U.S. Census Bureau, the county has a total area of 198 square miles (510 km^{2}), of which 197 square miles (510 km^{2}) is land and 0.9 square miles (2.3 km^{2}) (0.4%) is water. The South Fork of the Kentucky River passes through the county. Most of the precipitation that falls on the county ends up in this tributary of the Kentucky River. Some, however, on the northwest side of the county is in the Kentucky River watershed. Flood plains along the banks of the South of the Kentucky River and several streams provide the level land necessary for development/farming.

The county is located in the Eastern Mountain Coal Fields which is a part of the Appalachian Plateau (more precisely, the Cumberland Plateau). The elevation of the highest summit in the county is 1,730 ft (530 m) (+/- 10 ft (3 m)). It is located on the county's extreme southern boundary with Clay County. The lowest elevation (650 ft (200 m) +/- 10 ft (3 m)) is at the point where the South Fork crosses the Owsley/Lee border on the north side of the county.

=== Adjacent counties ===
- Lee County (north)
- Breathitt County (east)
- Perry County (southeast)
- Clay County (south)
- Jackson County (west)

=== Major highways ===
- Kentucky Route 30
- Kentucky Route 11
- Kentucky Route 28

=== National protected area ===
- Daniel Boone National Forest, (the same national forest that encompasses the frequently visited rock climbing and hiking destination known as the Red River Gorge)

== Demographics ==
Historical population
Census	Pop.	Note	%±
1850	3,774		—
1860	5,335		41.4%
1870	3,889		−27.1%
1880	4,942		27.1%
1890	5,975		20.9%
1900	6,874		15.0%
1910	7,979		16.1%
1920	7,820		−2.0%
1930	7,223		−7.6%
1940	8,957		24.0%
1950	7,324		−18.2%
1960	5,369		−26.7%
1970	5,023		−6.4%
1980	5,709		13.7%
1990	5,036		−11.8%
2000	4,858		−3.5%
2010	4,755		−2.1%
2020	4,051		−14.8%
2025 (est.)	3,932	▼	−2.9%
U.S. Decennial Census; 1790–1960 1900–1990; 1990–2000 2010–2021

Racial Makeup
Race (NH = Non-Hispanic)	% 2020	% 2010	% 2000	Pop. 2020	Pop. 2010	Pop. 2000
White Alone (NH)	96.4%	98%	98.5%	3,905	4,659	4,785
Black Alone (NH)	0.3%	0.3%	0.1%	11	13	5
American Indian Alone (NH)	0%	0.3%	0.1%	1	12	3
Asian Alone (NH)	0%	0%	0%	1	2	2
Pacific Islander Alone (NH)	0.1%	0%	0%	5	0	1
Other Race Alone (NH)	0.1%	0.1%	0%	4	3	1
Multiracial (NH)	2%	0.6%	0.5%	82	27	26
Hispanic (Any race)	1%	0.8%	0.7%	42	39	35

The most reported ancestries in 2020 were English (38.6%), Irish (5.9%), German (2.8%), and Scottish (1.1%).

=== 2020 census ===
As of the 2020 census, the county had a population of 4,051. The median age was 45.1 years. 21.4% of residents were under the age of 18 and 21.7% of residents were 65 years of age or older. For every 100 females there were 98.8 males, and for every 100 females age 18 and over there were 95.5 males age 18 and over.

The racial makeup of the county was 96.4% White, 0.3% Black or African American, 0.1% American Indian and Alaska Native, 0.1% Asian, 0.1% Native Hawaiian and Pacific Islander, 0.1% from some other race, and 2.8% from two or more races. Hispanic or Latino residents of any race comprised 1.0% of the population.

0.0% of residents lived in urban areas, while 100.0% lived in rural areas.

There were 1,735 households in the county, of which 27.4% had children under the age of 18 living with them and 31.0% had a female householder with no spouse or partner present. About 36.8% of all households were made up of individuals and 15.2% had someone living alone who was 65 years of age or older.

There were 2,044 housing units, of which 15.1% were vacant. Among occupied housing units, 71.4% were owner-occupied and 28.6% were renter-occupied. The homeowner vacancy rate was 0.8% and the rental vacancy rate was 7.0%.

=== 2010 census ===
As of the census of 2010, there were 4,755 people, 2,328 housing units, and 1,733 households residing in the county. The population density was 24.1 per square mile (9.3/km^{2}). The racial makeup of the county was 98.7% White, 0.3% Black or African American, 0.3% Native American, ~ 0% Asian, 0% Pacific Islander, and 0.8% of the population were Hispanics or Latinos of any race.

There were 1,894 households, out of which 32.6% had children under the age of 18 living with them, 54.8% were married couples living together, 12.7% had a female householder with no husband present, and 26.7% were non-families. 24.5% of all households were made up of individuals, and 10.7% had someone living alone who was 65 years of age or older. The average household size was 2.51 and the average family size was 2.98.

The age distribution was 24.6% under the age of 18, 8.9% from 18 to 24, 27.0% from 25 to 44, 24.5% from 45 to 64, and 15.0% who were 65 years of age or older. The median age was 38 years. For every 100 females there were 101.8 males. For every 100 females age 18 and over, there were 96.7 males.

=== 2000 census ===
The median income for a household in the county was $15,805, which is the third lowest in the nation and the lowest among counties with a non-Hispanic white majority population, and the median income for a family was $18,034. Males had a median income of $25,100 versus $18,203 for females. The per capita income for the county was $10,742. About 41.7% of families and 45.4% of the population were below the poverty line, including 56.3% of those under age 18 and 34.5% of those age 65 or over.

In 2009, government benefits accounted for 53.07% of personal income.

== Politics ==
United States presidential election results for Owsley County, Kentucky
Year	Republican		Democratic		Third party(ies)	
Year	No.	%	No.	%	No.	%
1912	711	55.12%	221	17.13%	358	27.75%
1916	1,173	84.88%	197	14.25%	12	0.87%
1920	1,914	87.80%	257	11.79%	9	0.41%
1924	1,434	80.38%	323	18.11%	27	1.51%
1928	2,107	89.55%	241	10.24%	5	0.21%
1932	1,985	79.08%	520	20.72%	5	0.20%
1936	2,273	83.02%	464	16.95%	1	0.04%
1940	2,672	81.81%	591	18.10%	3	0.09%
1944	2,033	86.11%	325	13.77%	3	0.13%
1948	1,718	79.28%	437	20.17%	12	0.55%
1952	1,954	81.86%	419	17.55%	14	0.59%
1956	2,013	85.77%	331	14.10%	3	0.13%
1960	2,169	86.24%	346	13.76%	0	0.00%
1964	1,167	66.92%	571	32.74%	6	0.34%
1968	1,417	75.49%	303	16.14%	157	8.36%
1972	1,328	83.68%	251	15.82%	8	0.50%
1976	1,053	77.03%	305	22.31%	9	0.66%
1980	1,250	73.57%	437	25.72%	12	0.71%
1984	1,466	79.20%	375	20.26%	10	0.54%
1988	1,266	78.49%	345	21.39%	2	0.12%
1992	1,437	61.36%	678	28.95%	227	9.69%
1996	920	53.24%	647	37.44%	161	9.32%
2000	1,466	80.28%	339	18.57%	21	1.15%
2004	1,558	77.94%	430	21.51%	11	0.55%
2008	1,279	75.86%	381	22.60%	26	1.54%
2012	1,279	80.95%	283	17.91%	18	1.14%
2016	1,474	83.80%	256	14.55%	29	1.65%
2020	1,671	88.13%	216	11.39%	9	0.47%
2024	1,625	88.36%	203	11.04%	11	0.60%

Owing to its fierce Unionist sympathies, seen in the fact that the county saw a greater proportion of its population volunteer for the Union Army than any other county in Kentucky, and likely any other county in the country, Owsley County became, and has always remained, an overwhelmingly Republican county. Every Republican presidential candidate has carried Owsley County since the party seriously contested the state for the first time in 1864. Since 1888, no Democratic candidate has received as much as forty percent of the county's vote, and only twice (Lyndon Johnson in 1964 and Bill Clinton in 1996) have the Democrats received so much as thirty percent.

=== Elected officials ===
Elected officials as of January 3, 2025
U.S. House	Hal Rogers (R)	KY 5
Ky. Senate	Robert Stivers (R)	25
Ky. House	Chris Fugate (R)	84

== Economy ==
=== Natural resources ===
Though deep mines in thin coal seams once provided jobs and income for local residents, this is not the case in present-day Owsley County. There are some surface coal mining sites in the county—one notable strip mine is visible from the road and presently operating 3 miles north of Booneville on Kentucky Route 11.

Gas and oil wells are particularly dense on the north side of the county, though few are in operation.

Timber is an integral part of the local economy. There is a sawmill located in the Lerose community on Kentucky Route 30 East now inoperable. Several log-yards are visible where timber is staged for further processing.

== Education ==
Public schools are operated by the Owsley County School District. Owsley County has one Christian Private school currently operating. Sugar Camp Baptist Church maintains a primary educational facility off of Hwy. 30 East.

== Attractions ==
=== Abraham Lincoln Relief Sculpture ===
The Abraham Lincoln Relief Sculpture, locally known as Abe Lincoln Rock or Abraham Lincoln Rock, is located just off Highway 846 in the Conkling community of Owsley County. The sculpture is listed in the inventory of folk art in the Smithsonian American Art Museum.

The sculpture was carved by a traveling pack peddler, Granville Johnson, in the 1930s. Local legend has it that Johnson had come to Owsley County ill and in need of assistance. The John Williams family cared for him on their farm located south of Booneville. As he began to recover his strength, Mr. Johnson would take a hammer and chisel and climb the hill behind the Williams' home each day. Once recovered well enough to travel again he revealed the sculpture, which he had created as a gift of appreciation to the family.

The Owsley County Fiscal Court purchased the sculpture and surrounding land in 2008 from Clyde and Dianna Combs. There are no signs informing would-be visitors of its actual location; therefore, it's difficult to find for any potential tourists who wish to visit the site.

== Cemeteries ==
- Baker-Amis Cemetery
- Botner Cemetery
- Callahan Cemetery
- Clark-Scott Cemetery
- Cortland Cemetery
- Elijah Isaacs Graveyard
- Griffith Cemetery
- Gross Cemetery
- Hudson Cemetery
- Horn Hill Cemetery
- John Tyler Brewer Cemetery
- King Cemetery
- Lerose Cemetery
- McIntosh Cemetery
- Morris Cemetery
- Noble Cemetery
- Pendergrass Cemetery
- Shepherd Cemetery
- Stewart Cemetery
- Island City Community Cemetery (maintained by the 1st Baptist Church of Island City)

== Communities ==
=== City ===
- Booneville (county seat)

=== Unincorporated communities ===
- Arnett
- Big Springs
- Blake
- Brewer Neighborhood
- Chestnut Gap
- Conkling
- Couch Fork
- Couch Town
- Cowcreek
- Elk Lick
- Endee
- Eversole
- Fish Creek
- Hall
- Hogg
- Indian Creek
- Island City
- Lerose
- Levi
- Lucky Fork
- Major
- Mistletoe
- Moors
- Needmore
- Pebworth
- Pleasant
- Ricetown
- Rock Spring
- Rockhouse
- Scoville
- Sebastian
- Shephard
- Southfork
- Stacey
- Stay
- Sturgeon
- Sugar Camp
- Taft
- Travellers Rest
- Vincent
- Whoopflarea

== Notable residents ==
=== Earle Combs ===
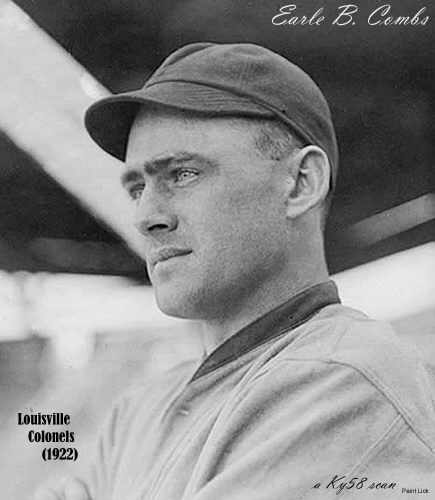
Combs in a photograph taken while he was playing for the Louisville Colonels

Earle Bryan Combs, born May 13, 1899, at Pebworth in Owsley County, played baseball for the New York Yankees from 1924 to 1935 and was inducted into the Baseball Hall of Fame in 1970. He was an ideal leadoff hitter for the legendary teams of the 1920s and 1930s. During this time, he played with Babe Ruth and Lou Gehrig. He averaged nearly 200 hits and 70 walks a season helping him compile a .325 career batting mark. He is featured in the National Baseball Hall of Fame. A plaque to honor his birthplace stands on Highway 11 in Pebworth.

Combs left Owsley County to pursue an education in 1917 at the age of 18. After he left the county, he never returned for any considerable amount of time. Eventually in 1954, he settled in Richmond, KY after his extensive professional baseball career.

=== Daniel Boone ===
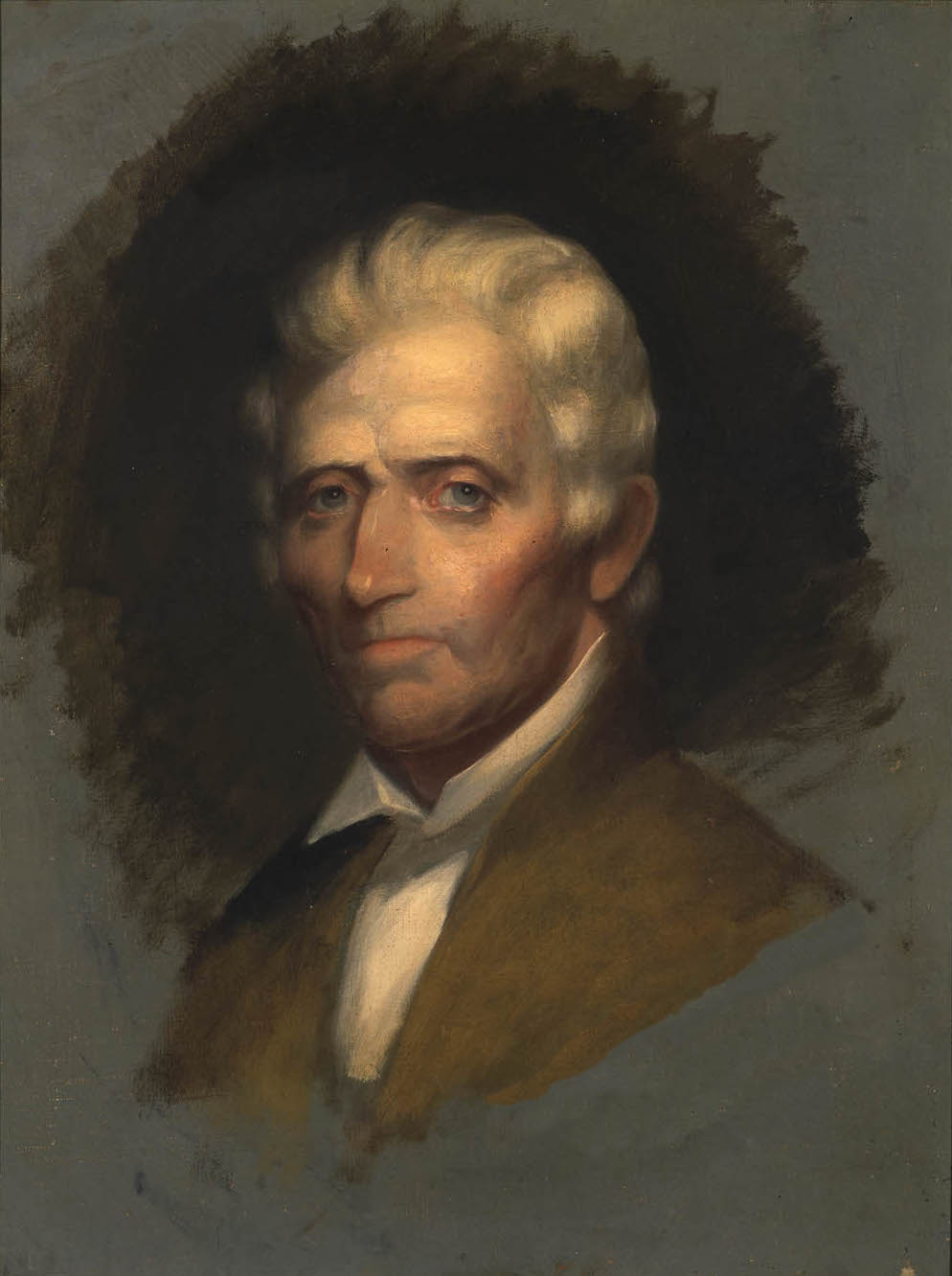
Daniel Boone

According to Joyce Wilson's book, A Romantic History of Owsley County, Daniel Boone made his way to Owsley County on a two-year hunt from 1769 to 1771. In 1784 he returned and surveyed some 50,000 acres for James Moore and Col. John Donelson. Boone used a huge rock at the mouth of Sexton's Creek, on which he carved his initials, as his starting point in these surveys. This rock, known as "Boone Rock" or "Goose Rock" is still there, located approximately nine miles south of Booneville on Highway 11 South. However, due to changes in the course of the stream throughout time, the initials are under water and cannot be seen, even during dry seasons.

Boone was impressed with this area and called it "a place where peace crowns the sylvan shade." He owned his own land, of which a portion remained in the family until 1819, when Daniel Boone Jr. transferred the last 1,000-acre tract on Meadow Creek to William Strong.

Daniel Boone's favorite camping spot, known as the "old encampment", is located a half a mile south of Booneville between the highway and the river just below the area known as the "Sag". In later life, Daniel Boone learned that many claims he had to land were invalid because someone else had made official claims before he did.

Daniel Boone's granddaughter, Leah Schull Newman, and other Boone descendants, are buried in the Newnam Cemetery located in the Pebworth area on Highway 11 North.

== See also ==
- National Register of Historic Places listings in Owsley County, Kentucky
