= National Register of Historic Places listings in Menifee County, Kentucky =

Location of Menifee County in Kentucky

This is a list of the National Register of Historic Places listings in Menifee County, Kentucky.

It is intended to be a complete list of the properties on the National Register of Historic Places in Menifee County, Kentucky, United States. The locations of National Register properties for which the latitude and longitude coordinates are included below, may be seen in a map.

There are 6 properties listed on the National Register in the county.

This National Park Service list is complete through NPS recent listings posted December 12, 2025.

== Current listings ==
	Name on the Register	Image	Date listed	Location	City or town	Description
1	Archeological Site 15MF355		July 11, 1985 (#85001505)	Address Restricted	Frenchburg	
2	Frenchburg School Campus	Frenchburg School Campus	December 22, 1978 (#78001387)	U.S. Route 460; 37°57′07″N 83°37′46″W	Frenchburg	
3	Red River Gorge District		September 12, 2003 (#03000919)	Includes the confluence of Gladie Creek with the Red River; 37°50′12″N 83°36′44″W	Daniel Boone National Forest	A large area in the national forest with extensive archaeological resources, having 442 contributing sites including numerous rock shelters. Extends also into Powell County and Wolfe County.
4	Skidmore Petroglyphs		January 2, 1992 (#91001887)	Address Restricted	Fagan	
5	Spratt's Petroglyphs (15MF353)		September 8, 1989 (#89001197)	Address Restricted	Frenchburg	
6	W.S. Webb Memorial Rock Shelter		January 9, 1979 (#79001022)	Address Restricted	Frenchburg	Site of a hunting camp, where objects such as triangular arrowheads, ceramic jars, cornhusks, corn kernels, cut cane, and cordage were left by ancient peoples. Included in Red River Gorge District.

== See also ==
- List of National Historic Landmarks in Kentucky
- National Register of Historic Places listings in Kentucky
