= 2012 United States presidential election in Kentucky =

- November 6, 2012
- Turnout: 59.70%▼

Nominee	Mitt Romney	Barack Obama
Party	Republican	Democratic
Home state	Massachusetts	Illinois
Running mate	Paul Ryan	Joe Biden
Electoral vote	8	0
Popular vote	1,087,190	679,370
Percentage	60.49%	37.80%

Romney
50–60%
60–70%
70–80%
80–90%
Obama
40–50%
50–60%
President before election
Barack Obama
Democratic
Elected President
Barack Obama
Democratic

The 2012 United States presidential election in Kentucky took place on November 6, 2012, as part of the 2012 General Election in which all 50 states plus the District of Columbia participated. Kentucky voters chose eight electors to represent them in the Electoral College via a popular vote pitting incumbent Democratic President Barack Obama and his running mate, Vice President Joe Biden, against Republican challenger and former Massachusetts Governor Mitt Romney and his running mate, Congressman Paul Ryan.

Romney carried Kentucky by a landslide margin, winning 60.47% of the vote to Obama's 37.78%. This represented a margin of 22.69%, a great improvement for the Republican Party from 2008, when they won with a 16.22% margin. Although Kentucky had been won by Southern Democrat Bill Clinton twice in the 1990s, Obama was seen as a poor cultural fit for the state, and he did not compete here either time he ran. The Romney campaign also attacked Obama's administration as being hostile to the coal industry, historically an important part of the state's economy. Consequently, Obama suffered a historically poor showing in the traditionally staunchly Democratic coalfields of Eastern Kentucky, where many counties that had even voted by wide margins for landslide Democratic losers like George McGovern and Walter Mondale defected to the Republicans in 2012.

Knott County, which had given Clinton 73% of the vote in 1996 and nearly 72% to Mondale in 1984 (despite the latter losing nationally by more than 18 percentage points and only carrying one state), gave Romney 73% of the vote in 2012. Even Elliott County, the only county in the state in which Obama had broken 60% in 2008, barely held on in 2012, giving Obama a narrow plurality win, his only victory in the region, and one of just four county wins in the entire state. This marked the first time since the county's founding that the Democratic nominee won less than 60% of the vote in Elliott County, and would prove to be the conclusion of Elliott's longest-in-the-nation, 140-year Democratic voting streak. The county would flip to the GOP by a landslide margin four years later. Wolfe County, which had returned to the Democratic Party in 2004 and 2008 after casting its first-ever Republican vote for George W. Bush in 2000, went for Romney by over twenty points. As such, Obama became the first Democrat to ever win the White House without carrying Wolfe County since its founding in 1860, Menifee County since its founding in 1869, or Henderson County since the founding of the Republican Party.

The only part of the state where Obama won convincingly was Jefferson County, the most urban and populous county in the state, and home to Louisville. He also eked out a close win in Fayette County, the second-most populous county, home to Lexington. Despite losing five counties he won in 2008, he managed to flip Franklin County, home to the state capital of Frankfort, which he had narrowly lost in 2008. As of the 2024 presidential election, this is the last time that Elliott and Franklin Counties voted for a Democrat in a presidential election. Obama is the only Democrat to ever win two terms without carrying the state at least once.

== Primary elections ==
=== Democratic primary ===
Kentucky Democratic primary, 2012
- May 22, 2012
Candidate	Barack Obama	Uncommitted
Home state	Illinois	n/a
Delegate count	39	34
Popular vote	119,293	86,925
Percentage	57.85%	42.15%
- Barack Obama Uncommitted Tie Obama: 50–60% 60–70% 70–80% 80–90% Uncommitted: 50–60% 60–70% 70–80% Kentucky results by county

Barack Obama's only "opponent" in the primary was the "Uncommitted" ballot option, which garnered more than 42% of the primary vote, making Kentucky one of Obama's worst contested primary results.

Kentucky Democratic primary, 2012
Candidate	Votes	Percentage	Delegates
Barack Obama (incumbent)	119,293	57.85%	39
Uncommitted	86,925	42.15%	34

=== Republican primary ===
Kentucky Republican primary, 2012
- May 22, 2012

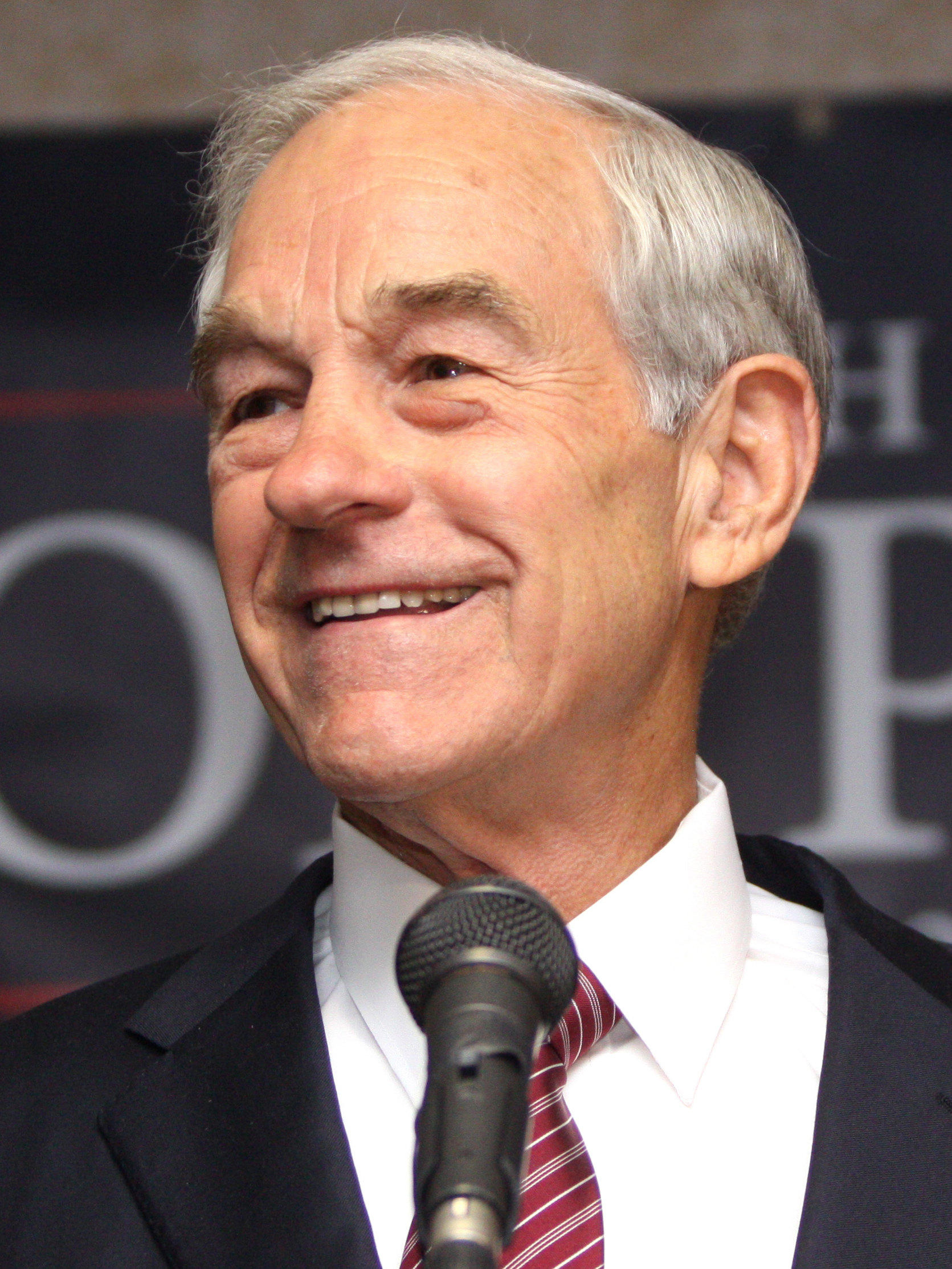

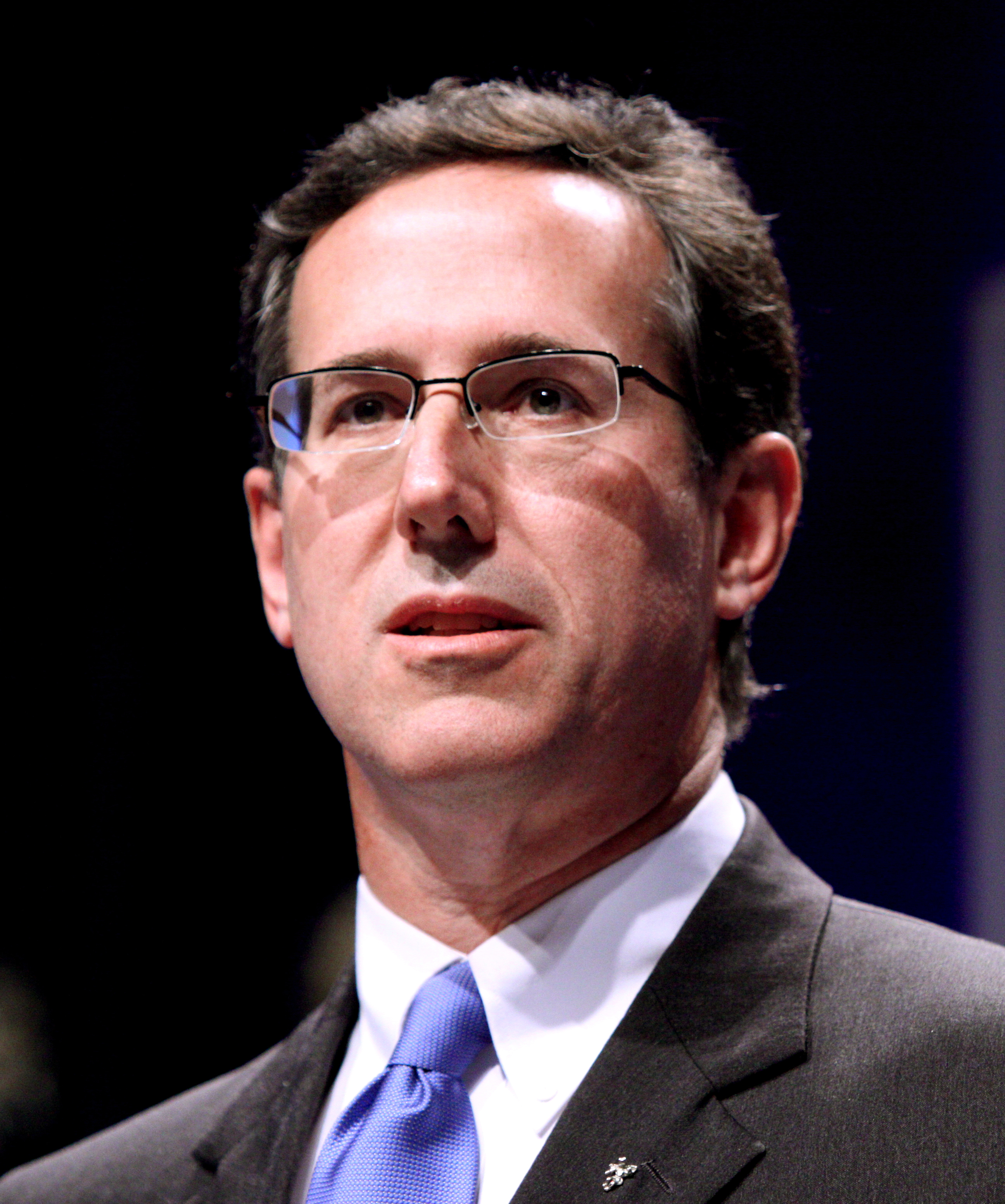

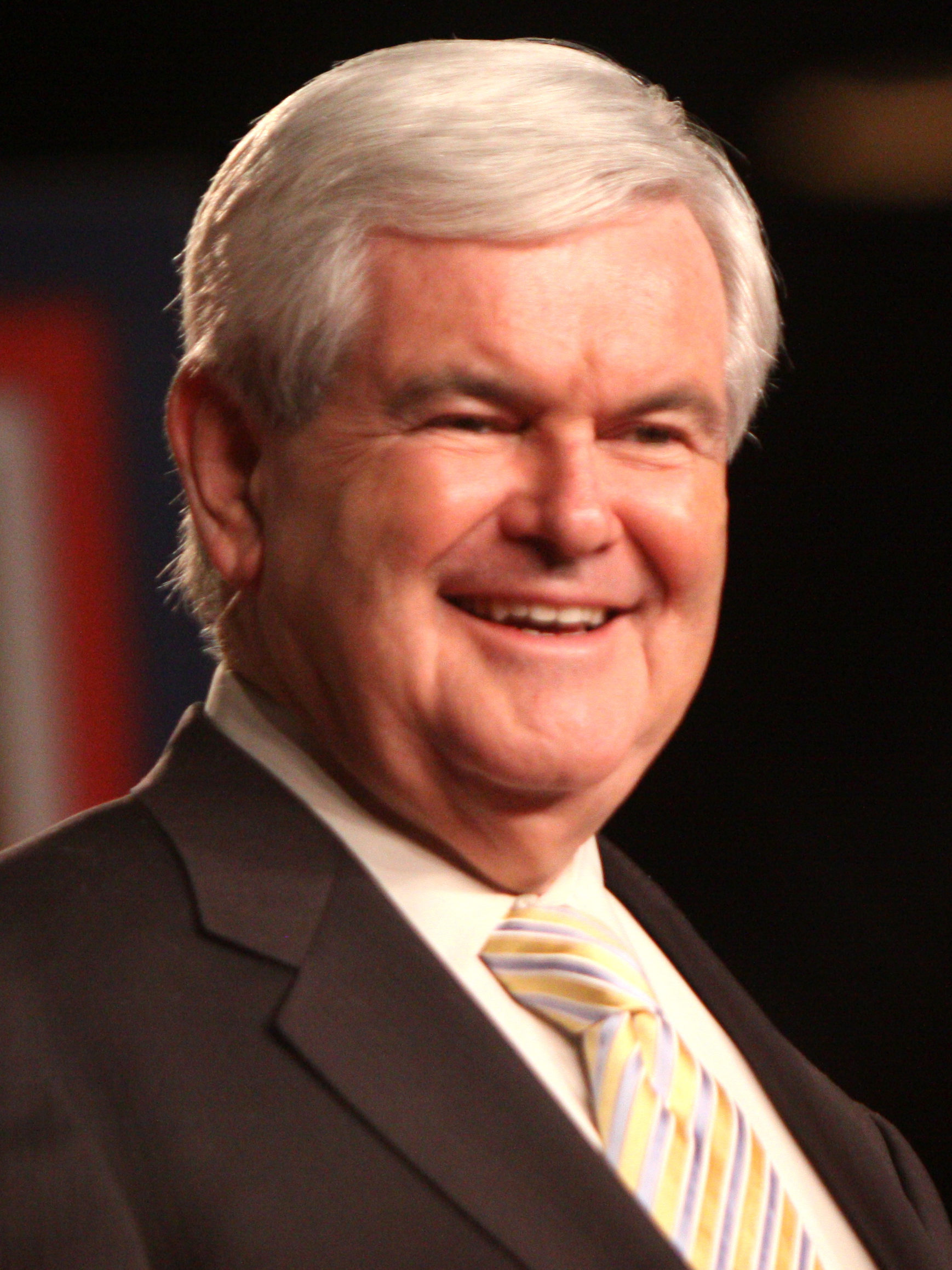

Candidate	Mitt Romney	Ron Paul	Rick Santorum
Home state	Massachusetts	Texas	Pennsylvania
Delegate count	42	0	0
Popular vote	117,621	22,074	15,629
Percentage	66.77%	12.53%	8.87%
Candidate	Newt Gingrich	Uncommitted
Home state	Georgia	N/A
Delegate count	0	0
Popular vote	10,479	10,357
Percentage	5.95%	5.88%
- Kentucky results by county Mitt Romney (Note: Italicization indicates a withdrawn candidacy)

The Republican primary occurred on May 22, 2012. 42 delegates were chosen, all of which were allocated to and pledged to vote for Mitt Romney at the 2012 Republican National Convention. Three delegates remain unpledged to any candidate. All Republicans in Kentucky were allowed to participate in the primary. A Republican primary was also held in Arkansas on this day.

Rick Santorum and Newt Gingrich withdrew from the presidential race on April 10 and May 2, 2012, respectively. Both endorsed Romney as the Republican nominee.

Kentucky Republican primary, 2012
Candidate	Votes	Percentage	Delegates
Mitt Romney	117,621	66.8%	42
Ron Paul	22,074	12.53%	0
Rick Santorum	15,629	8.87%	0
Newt Gingrich	10,479	5.95%	0
Uncommitted	10,357	5.88%	0
Unpledged delegates:			3
Total:	176,160	100.00%	45

Key:	Withdrew prior to contest

== General election ==
=== Predictions ===
Source	Ranking	As of
Huffington Post	Safe R	November 6, 2012
CNN	Safe R	November 6, 2012
New York Times	Safe R	November 6, 2012
Washington Post	Safe R	November 6, 2012
RealClearPolitics	Solid R	November 6, 2012
Sabato's Crystal Ball	Solid R	November 5, 2012
FiveThirtyEight	Solid R	November 6, 2012

=== Results ===
United States presidential election in Kentucky, 2012
Party	Candidate	Running mate	Votes	Percentage	Electoral votes
Republican	Mitt Romney	Paul Ryan	1,087,190	60.47%	8
Democratic	Barack Obama (incumbent)	Joe Biden (incumbent)	679,370	37.78%	0
Libertarian	Gary Johnson	Jim Gray	17,063	0.95%	0
Independent	Randall Terry	Missy Smith	6,872	0.38%	0
Green	Jill Stein	Cheri Honkala	6,337	0.35%	0
Others			380	0.02%	0
Totals			1,797,212	100.00%	8
Voter turnout (registered voters)					59.24%

==== By county ====
County	Mitt Romney Republican		Barack Obama Democratic		Various candidates Other parties		Margin		Total
County	#	%	#	%	#	%	#	%	Total
Adair	5,841	76.86%	1,660	21.84%	99	1.30%	4,181	55.02%	7,600
Allen	5,184	73.01%	1,808	25.46%	108	1.53%	3,376	47.55%	7,100
Anderson	6,822	66.10%	3,315	32.12%	183	1.78%	3,507	33.98%	10,320
Ballard	2,647	67.96%	1,189	30.53%	59	1.51%	1,458	37.43%	3,895
Barren	10,922	65.92%	5,400	32.59%	246	1.49%	5,522	33.33%	16,568
Bath	2,275	55.19%	1,770	42.94%	77	1.87%	505	12.25%	4,122
Bell	7,127	75.16%	2,224	23.45%	131	1.39%	4,903	51.71%	9,482
Boone	35,922	68.41%	15,629	29.76%	960	1.83%	20,293	38.65%	52,511
Bourbon	4,692	59.22%	3,075	38.81%	156	1.97%	1,617	20.41%	7,923
Boyd	10,884	57.14%	7,776	40.82%	389	2.04%	3,108	16.32%	19,049
Boyle	7,703	62.26%	4,471	36.14%	199	1.60%	3,232	26.12%	12,373
Bracken	2,029	62.78%	1,147	35.49%	56	1.73%	882	27.29%	3,232
Breathitt	3,318	66.25%	1,562	31.19%	128	2.56%	1,756	35.06%	5,008
Breckinridge	5,025	63.06%	2,825	35.45%	119	1.49%	2,200	27.61%	7,969
Bullitt	21,306	67.04%	9,971	31.38%	502	1.58%	11,335	35.66%	31,779
Butler	3,716	73.44%	1,293	25.55%	51	1.01%	2,423	47.89%	5,060
Caldwell	3,904	66.62%	1,852	31.60%	104	1.78%	2,052	35.02%	5,860
Calloway	9,440	62.63%	5,317	35.28%	315	2.09%	4,123	27.35%	15,072
Campbell	24,240	60.33%	15,080	37.53%	857	2.14%	9,160	22.80%	40,177
Carlisle	1,835	70.06%	750	28.64%	34	1.30%	1,085	41.42%	2,619
Carroll	1,999	54.32%	1,629	44.27%	52	1.41%	370	10.05%	3,680
Carter	5,279	59.26%	3,383	37.98%	246	2.76%	1,896	21.28%	8,908
Casey	4,904	80.51%	1,086	17.83%	101	1.66%	3,818	62.68%	6,091
Christian	13,475	61.38%	8,252	37.59%	228	1.03%	5,223	23.79%	21,955
Clark	9,931	64.42%	5,228	33.91%	257	1.67%	4,703	30.51%	15,416
Clay	6,176	83.65%	1,111	15.05%	96	1.30%	5,065	68.60%	7,383
Clinton	3,569	81.24%	752	17.12%	72	1.64%	2,817	64.12%	4,393
Crittenden	2,839	73.66%	960	24.91%	55	1.43%	1,879	48.75%	3,854
Cumberland	2,216	77.65%	599	20.99%	39	1.36%	1,617	56.66%	2,854
Daviess	25,092	59.62%	16,208	38.51%	787	1.87%	8,884	21.11%	42,087
Edmonson	3,232	69.24%	1,374	29.43%	62	1.33%	1,858	39.81%	4,668
Elliott	1,126	46.94%	1,186	49.44%	87	3.62%	-60	-2.50%	2,399
Estill	3,749	72.32%	1,356	26.16%	79	1.52%	2,393	46.16%	5,184
Fayette	60,795	48.30%	62,080	49.32%	2,991	2.38%	-1,285	-1.02%	125,866
Fleming	3,780	65.38%	1,911	33.05%	91	1.57%	1,869	32.33%	5,782
Floyd	9,784	65.71%	4,733	31.79%	373	2.50%	5,051	33.92%	14,890
Franklin	11,345	48.61%	11,535	49.43%	457	1.96%	-190	-0.82%	23,337
Fulton	1,425	57.44%	1,022	41.19%	34	1.37%	403	16.25%	2,481
Gallatin	1,758	57.43%	1,238	40.44%	65	2.13%	520	16.99%	3,061
Garrard	5,310	75.03%	1,661	23.47%	106	1.50%	3,649	51.56%	7,077
Grant	5,664	65.80%	2,810	32.64%	134	1.56%	2,854	33.16%	8,608
Graves	10,699	69.01%	4,547	29.33%	257	1.66%	6,152	39.68%	15,503
Grayson	6,404	69.08%	2,744	29.60%	123	1.32%	3,660	39.48%	9,271
Green	3,634	74.84%	1,165	23.99%	57	1.17%	2,469	50.85%	4,856
Greenup	8,855	58.38%	6,027	39.73%	286	1.89%	2,828	18.65%	15,168
Hancock	2,212	53.51%	1,833	44.34%	89	2.15%	379	9.17%	4,134
Hardin	23,357	59.56%	15,214	38.79%	647	1.65%	8,143	20.77%	39,218
Harlan	8,652	81.19%	1,830	17.17%	175	1.64%	6,822	64.02%	10,657
Harrison	4,556	63.60%	2,471	34.50%	136	1.90%	2,085	29.10%	7,163
Hart	4,257	64.29%	2,283	34.48%	82	1.23%	1,974	29.81%	6,622
Henderson	10,296	55.29%	8,091	43.45%	235	1.26%	2,205	11.84%	18,622
Henry	3,940	59.79%	2,530	38.39%	120	1.82%	1,410	21.40%	6,590
Hickman	1,431	66.90%	686	32.07%	22	1.03%	745	34.83%	2,139
Hopkins	13,681	69.21%	5,789	29.29%	297	1.50%	7,892	39.92%	19,767
Jackson	4,365	86.25%	612	12.09%	84	1.66%	3,753	74.16%	5,061
Jefferson	148,423	43.60%	186,181	54.69%	5,808	1.71%	-37,758	-11.09%	340,412
Jessamine	14,233	68.98%	6,001	29.08%	399	1.94%	8,232	39.90%	20,633
Johnson	7,095	78.53%	1,723	19.07%	217	2.40%	5,372	59.46%	9,035
Kenton	41,389	61.13%	24,920	36.81%	1,395	2.06%	16,469	24.32%	67,704
Knott	4,130	72.55%	1,420	24.94%	143	2.51%	2,710	47.61%	5,693
Knox	8,467	76.28%	2,484	22.38%	149	1.34%	5,983	53.90%	11,100
LaRue	3,911	67.85%	1,733	30.07%	120	2.08%	2,178	37.78%	5,764
Laurel	18,151	81.00%	3,905	17.43%	352	1.57%	14,246	63.57%	22,408
Lawrence	3,995	71.44%	1,520	27.18%	77	1.38%	2,475	44.26%	5,592
Lee	1,977	75.37%	595	22.68%	51	1.95%	1,382	52.69%	2,623
Leslie	4,439	89.62%	433	8.74%	81	1.64%	4,006	80.88%	4,953
Letcher	6,811	77.77%	1,702	19.43%	245	2.80%	5,109	58.34%	8,758
Lewis	3,326	69.74%	1,342	28.14%	101	2.12%	1,984	41.60%	4,769
Lincoln	6,416	70.10%	2,582	28.21%	154	1.69%	3,834	41.89%	9,152
Livingston	3,089	68.48%	1,346	29.84%	76	1.68%	1,743	38.64%	4,511
Logan	6,899	65.64%	3,469	33.01%	142	1.35%	3,430	32.63%	10,510
Lyon	2,412	62.83%	1,373	35.76%	54	1.41%	1,039	27.07%	3,839
Madison	21,128	63.41%	11,512	34.55%	682	2.04%	9,616	28.86%	33,322
Magoffin	3,391	69.12%	1,433	29.21%	82	1.67%	1,958	39.91%	4,906
Marion	3,800	51.93%	3,418	46.71%	100	1.36%	382	5.22%	7,318
Marshall	10,402	66.17%	5,022	31.95%	295	1.88%	5,380	34.22%	15,719
Martin	3,180	83.16%	574	15.01%	70	1.83%	2,606	68.15%	3,824
Mason	4,197	60.99%	2,592	37.67%	92	1.34%	1,605	23.32%	6,881
McCracken	19,979	65.40%	10,062	32.94%	510	1.66%	9,917	32.46%	30,551
McCreary	4,564	79.97%	1,069	18.73%	74	1.30%	3,495	61.24%	5,707
McLean	2,705	64.40%	1,432	34.10%	63	1.50%	1,273	30.30%	4,200
Meade	6,606	60.52%	4,122	37.76%	188	1.72%	2,484	22.76%	10,916
Menifee	1,484	57.12%	1,048	40.34%	66	2.54%	436	16.78%	2,598
Mercer	6,820	68.62%	2,966	29.84%	153	1.54%	3,854	38.78%	9,939
Metcalfe	2,676	63.96%	1,425	34.06%	83	1.98%	1,251	29.90%	4,184
Monroe	3,762	79.27%	936	19.72%	48	1.01%	2,826	59.55%	4,746
Montgomery	6,398	62.43%	3,701	36.11%	149	1.46%	2,697	26.32%	10,248
Morgan	3,021	67.55%	1,369	30.61%	82	1.84%	1,652	36.94%	4,472
Muhlenberg	7,762	60.93%	4,771	37.45%	206	1.62%	2,991	23.48%	12,739
Nelson	10,673	57.59%	7,611	41.07%	249	1.34%	3,062	16.52%	18,533
Nicholas	1,583	61.33%	948	36.73%	50	1.94%	635	24.60%	2,581
Ohio	6,470	67.07%	2,987	30.97%	189	1.96%	3,483	36.10%	9,646
Oldham	20,179	67.52%	9,240	30.92%	465	1.56%	10,939	36.60%	29,884
Owen	2,971	65.20%	1,501	32.94%	85	1.86%	1,470	32.26%	4,557
Owsley	1,279	80.95%	283	17.91%	18	1.14%	996	63.04%	1,580
Pendleton	3,556	64.26%	1,859	33.59%	119	2.15%	1,697	30.67%	5,534
Perry	8,040	78.51%	2,047	19.99%	154	1.50%	5,993	58.52%	10,241
Pike	17,590	74.42%	5,646	23.89%	400	1.69%	11,944	50.53%	23,636
Powell	2,766	61.73%	1,620	36.15%	95	2.12%	1,146	25.58%	4,481
Pulaski	20,714	79.66%	4,976	19.14%	313	1.20%	15,738	60.52%	26,003
Robertson	579	61.93%	340	36.36%	16	1.71%	239	25.57%	935
Rockcastle	5,028	80.89%	1,097	17.65%	91	1.46%	3,931	63.24%	6,216
Rowan	4,035	52.64%	3,438	44.85%	192	2.51%	597	7.79%	7,665
Russell	6,346	80.24%	1,445	18.27%	118	1.49%	4,901	61.97%	7,909
Scott	12,679	61.63%	7,532	36.61%	362	1.76%	5,147	25.02%	20,573
Shelby	11,790	63.17%	6,634	35.55%	239	1.28%	5,156	27.62%	18,663
Simpson	4,355	61.40%	2,650	37.36%	88	1.24%	1,705	24.04%	7,093
Spencer	5,726	67.92%	2,549	30.23%	156	1.85%	3,177	37.69%	8,431
Taylor	7,551	68.96%	3,285	30.00%	114	1.04%	4,266	38.96%	10,950
Todd	3,247	68.82%	1,403	29.74%	68	1.44%	1,844	39.08%	4,718
Trigg	4,520	67.04%	2,115	31.37%	107	1.59%	2,405	35.67%	6,742
Trimble	2,133	60.20%	1,355	38.24%	55	1.56%	778	21.96%	3,543
Union	3,955	66.15%	1,942	32.48%	82	1.37%	2,013	33.67%	5,979
Warren	26,384	60.10%	16,805	38.28%	714	1.62%	9,579	21.82%	43,903
Washington	3,495	66.97%	1,669	31.98%	55	1.05%	1,826	34.99%	5,219
Wayne	5,289	73.36%	1,855	25.73%	66	0.91%	3,434	47.63%	7,210
Webster	3,607	65.94%	1,765	32.27%	98	1.79%	1,842	33.67%	5,470
Whitley	10,232	78.27%	2,683	20.52%	157	1.21%	7,549	57.75%	13,072
Wolfe	1,542	60.26%	976	38.14%	41	1.60%	566	22.12%	2,559
Woodford	7,219	58.54%	4,883	39.60%	230	1.86%	2,336	18.94%	12,332
Totals	1,087,190	60.47%	679,370	37.78%	31,488	1.75%	407,820	22.69%	1,798,048

Counties that flipped from Democratic to Republican

- Hancock (largest city: Lewisport)
- Henderson (largest city: Henderson)
- Menifee (largest city: Frenchburg)
- Rowan (largest city: Morehead)
- Wolfe (largest city: Campton)

Counties that flipped from Republican to Democratic

- Franklin (largest city: Frankfort)

==== By congressional district ====
Romney won five of six congressional districts.

District	Romney	Obama	Representative
1st	66.40%	32.10%	Ed Whitfield
2nd	63.28%	35.15%	Brett Guthrie
3rd	42.80%	55.73%	John Yarmuth
4th	63.38%	34.83%	Thomas Massie
5th	75.02%	23.25%	Hal Rogers
6th	55.79%	42.16%	Andy Barr

== Analysis ==
On election night, Kentucky went as expected to the Republican candidate, former Massachusetts Governor Mitt Romney, over incumbent Democratic President Barack Obama of bordering Illinois. Obama was reelected but nonetheless, lost Kentucky. In most recent years, Democrats have maintained their lead in registered voters compared to Republicans. However, Kentucky is known as a highly conservative state with a populist streak. In most recent presidential elections in Kentucky, Democrats usually achieve lower 40 or upper 30% margins. Obama performed significantly worse in 2012 than he did in 2008. Appalachian Kentucky used to be a place were Democrats thrived because of working-class people, particularly unionized coal miners. However, this region has become increasingly Republican in recent years. Romney performed, for the most part, very well statewide. Obama won four counties. Obama was, however, able to maintain a solid performance in perhaps the most Democratic place in the state, Jefferson County (Louisville Metro). The other counties Obama won were Franklin, Elliott and Fayette.

== See also ==
- Republican Party presidential debates, 2012
- Republican Party presidential primaries, 2012
- Results of the 2012 Republican Party presidential primaries
- Kentucky Republican Party
