= Sudith, Kentucky =

Unincorporated community in Kentucky, United States

- Unincorporated community
- Location within Kentucky Location within the United States
- Coordinates: 38°1′6″N 83°37′56″W
- Country: United States
- State: Kentucky
- County: Menifee
- Elevation: 751 ft (229 m)
- Time zone: UTC-5 (Eastern (EST))
  - Summer (DST): UTC-4 (EDT)
- GNIS feature ID: 515774

Sudith is an unincorporated community in Menifee County, Kentucky, United States. It lies along Route 36 north of the city of Frenchburg, the county seat of Menifee County. Its elevation is 751 feet (229 m).

Sudith is part of the Mount Sterling Micropolitan Statistical Area.
