= Denniston, Kentucky =

Unincorporated community in Kentucky, United States

- Unincorporated community
- Location within Kentucky Location within the United States
- Coordinates: 37°54′57″N 83°32′17″W
- Country: United States
- State: Kentucky
- County: Menifee
- Elevation: 1,106 ft (337 m)
- Time zone: UTC-5 (Eastern (EST))
  - Summer (DST): UTC-4 (EDT)
- ZIP codes: 40316
- GNIS feature ID: 511788

Denniston is an unincorporated community in Menifee County, Kentucky, United States. It lies along U.S. Route 460 and Kentucky Route 746, southeast of the city of Frenchburg, the county seat of Menifee County. Its elevation is 1,106 feet (337 m). It has a post office with the ZIP code 40316.

Denniston is part of the Mount Sterling Micropolitan Statistical Area.

The community was named for its first postmaster, Joseph C. Denniston.
