= Dog Trot, Kentucky =

Unincorporated community in Kentucky, United States

- Unincorporated community
- Location within Kentucky Location within the United States
- Coordinates: 37°58′18″N 83°41′40″W
- Country: United States
- State: Kentucky
- County: Menifee
- Elevation: 971 ft (296 m)
- Time zone: UTC-6 (Central (CST))
  - Summer (DST): UTC-5 (CST)
- GNIS feature ID: 2400769

Dog Trot is an unincorporated community located in Menifee County, Kentucky, United States.
