= Scranton, Kentucky =

Unincorporated community in Kentucky, United States

- Unincorporated community
- Location within Kentucky Location within the United States
- Coordinates: 37°59′14″N 83°31′18″W
- Country: United States
- State: Kentucky
- County: Menifee
- Elevation: 791 ft (241 m)
- Time zone: UTC-5 (Eastern (EST))
  - Summer (DST): UTC-4 (EDT)
- GNIS feature ID: 515303

Scranton is an unincorporated community in Menifee County, Kentucky, United States. It lies along Route 1274 northeast of the city of Frenchburg, the county seat of Menifee County. Its elevation is 791 feet (241 m).

Scranton is part of the Mount Sterling Micropolitan Statistical Area. It is named after the city of Scranton, Pennsylvania.
