= Mariba, Kentucky =

Unincorporated community in Kentucky, United States

- Unincorporated community
- Location within Kentucky Location within the United States
- Coordinates: 37°54′58″N 83°34′43″W
- Country: United States
- State: Kentucky
- County: Menifee
- Elevation: 1,175 ft (358 m)
- Time zone: UTC-5 (Eastern (EST))
  - Summer (DST): UTC-4 (EDT)
- GNIS feature ID: 513788

Mariba is an unincorporated community in Menifee County, Kentucky, United States. It lies along U.S. Route 460 and Kentucky Route 77, southeast of the city of Frenchburg, the county seat of Menifee County. Its elevation is 1,175 feet (358 m). The community is part of the Mount Sterling Micropolitan Statistical Area.

The name "Mariba" is taken from Mariba Osborne Taylor.
