= Means, Kentucky =

Unincorporated community in Kentucky, United States

- Unincorporated community
- Location within Kentucky Location within the United States
- Coordinates: 37°56′57″N 83°46′21″W
- Country: United States
- State: Kentucky
- County: Menifee
- Elevation: 850 ft (260 m)

Population (2010)
  - Total: 686
- Time zone: UTC-5 (Eastern (EST))
  - Summer (DST): UTC-4 (EDT)
- ZIP codes: 40346
- GNIS feature ID: 513896

Means is an unincorporated community in Menifee County, Kentucky, United States. It lies along U.S. Route 460 and Kentucky Route 713, west of the city of Frenchburg, the county seat of Menifee County. Its elevation is 850 feet (259 m). It has a post office with the ZIP code 40346. Means is part of the Mount Sterling Micropolitan Statistical Area.

The community has the name of the local Means family.
