= Plum Lick, Kentucky =

Unincorporated community in Kentucky, United States

- Unincorporated community
- Location within Kentucky Location within the United States
- Coordinates: 38°8′28″N 84°2′32″W
- Country: United States
- State: Kentucky
- County: Montgomery
- Elevation: 896 ft (273 m)
- Time zone: UTC-5 (Eastern (EST))
  - Summer (DST): UTC-4 (EDT)
- GNIS feature ID: 2491639

Plum Lick is an unincorporated community within Montgomery County, Kentucky, United States.
