= Camargo, Kentucky =

- City
- Location in Montgomery County, Kentucky
- Coordinates: 37°59′57″N 83°53′46″W
- Country: United States
- State: Kentucky
- County: Montgomery
- Incorporated: April 28, 1969

Government
  - Type: City Commission
  - Mayor: Clayton Neal

Area
  - Total: 2.21 sq mi (5.73 km^{2})
  - Land: 2.19 sq mi (5.67 km^{2})
  - Water: 0.027 sq mi (0.07 km^{2})
- Elevation: 922 ft (281 m)

Population (2020)
  - Total: 1,020
  - Density: 466.3/sq mi (180.04/km^{2})
- Time zone: UTC-5 (Eastern (EST))
  - Summer (DST): UTC-4 (EDT)
- ZIP Code: 40353
- FIPS code: 21-12052
- GNIS feature ID: 0488655
- Website: http://camargo.ky.gov/

Camargo is a home rule-class city in Montgomery County, Kentucky, in the United States. The population was 1,020 at the 2020 census. It is part of the Mount Sterling Micropolitan Statistical Area.

The town was named by soldiers returning from the Mexican–American War, either in honor of Camargo in Mexico or a Mexican entertainer of that name. The post office was established in 1848 and closed in 1963.

== Geography ==
Camargo is located in southern Montgomery County at 37°59′57″N 83°53′46″W (37.999241, -83.896203). U.S. Route 460 passes through the city as Camargo Road, leading northwest 5 miles (8 km) to Mount Sterling, the county seat, and southeast 15 miles (24 km) to Frenchburg.

According to the United States Census Bureau, Camargo has a total area of 2.21 square miles (5.7 km^{2}), of which 0.03 square miles (0.08 km^{2}), or 1.17%, are water. The city is bordered to the south by Bowles Branch, and Greenbrier Creek flows through the northern part of the city. Both streams are tributaries of Slate Creek, a north-flowing tributary of the Licking River, which joins the Ohio River at Covington.

== Demographics ==
Historical population
Census	Pop.	Note	%±
1880	95		—
1970	244		—
1980	1,301		433.2%
1990	1,022		−21.4%
2000	923		−9.7%
2010	1,081		17.1%
2020	1,020		−5.6%
U.S. Decennial Census

As of the census of 2000, there were 923 people, 362 households, and 275 families residing in the city. The population density was 436.6 inhabitants per square mile (168.6/km^{2}). There were 383 housing units at an average density of 181.2 per square mile (70.0/km^{2}). The racial makeup of the city was 98.70% White, 0.11% Asian, and 1.19% from two or more races. Hispanic or Latino of any race were 0.54% of the population.

There were 362 households, out of which 33.1% had children under the age of 18 living with them, 62.2% were married couples living together, 11.3% had a female householder with no husband present, and 23.8% were non-families. 20.7% of all households were made up of individuals, and 8.3% had someone living alone who was 65 years of age or older. The average household size was 2.55 and the average family size was 2.93.

In the city, the population was spread out, with 24.6% under the age of 18, 10.3% from 18 to 24, 30.8% from 25 to 44, 22.6% from 45 to 64, and 11.7% who were 65 years of age or older. The median age was 35 years. For every 100 females, there were 96.4 males. For every 100 females age 18 and over, there were 90.7 males.

The median income for a household in the city was $27,009, and the median income for a family was $32,019. Males had a median income of $31,827 versus $19,018 for females. The per capita income for the city was $13,154. About 23.6% of families and 27.0% of the population were below the poverty line, including 34.1% of those under age 18 and 31.5% of those age 65 or over.

== Education ==
Camargo has a lending library, a branch of the Montgomery County Public Library.
