= Korea, Kentucky =

Unincorporated community in Kentucky, United States

- Unincorporated community
- Location within Kentucky Location within the United States
- Coordinates: 37°56′31″N 83°28′43″W
- Country: United States
- State: Kentucky
- County: Menifee
- Elevation: 1,119 ft (341 m)
- Time zone: UTC-5 (Eastern (EST))
  - Summer (DST): UTC-4 (EDT)
- ZIP codes: 40340
- GNIS feature ID: 513178

Korea is an unincorporated community in Menifee County, Kentucky, United States. It lies along Route 1693 east of the city of Frenchburg, the county seat of Menifee County. A post office was opened in 1904 and was closed in 1982.

Korea is part of the Mount Sterling Micropolitan Statistical Area.
