= Pomeroyton, Kentucky =

Unincorporated community in Kentucky, United States

- Unincorporated community
- Location within Kentucky Location within the United States
- Coordinates: 37°52′16″N 83°31′18″W
- Country: United States
- State: Kentucky
- County: Menifee
- Elevation: 1,043 ft (318 m)
- Time zone: UTC-5 (Eastern (EST))
  - Summer (DST): UTC-4 (EDT)
- GNIS feature ID: 514686

Pomeroyton is an unincorporated community in Menifee County, Kentucky, United States. It lies along Route 746, southeast of the city of Frenchburg, the county seat of Menifee County. Its elevation is 1,043 feet (318 m).

Pomeroyton is part of the Mount Sterling Micropolitan Statistical Area.
