= Wellington, Menifee County, Kentucky =

Unincorporated community in Kentucky, United States

Wellington, Kentucky
- Unincorporated community
- Location within Kentucky Location within the United States
- Coordinates: 37°54′52″N 83°30′43″W
- Country: United States
- State: Kentucky
- County: Menifee
- Elevation: 1,194 ft (364 m)
- Time zone: UTC-5 (Eastern (EST))
  - Summer (DST): UTC-4 (EDT)
- ZIP codes: 40387
- GNIS feature ID: 516267

Wellington is an unincorporated community in Menifee County, Kentucky, United States. It lies along U.S. Route 460 and Kentucky Route 1693 southeast of the city of Frenchburg, the county seat of Menifee County. Its elevation is 1,194 feet (364 m). It has a post office with the ZIP code 40387.

Wellington is part of the Mount Sterling Micropolitan Statistical Area.

== History ==
On March 2, 2012, a tornado struck Wellington and the nearby city of West Liberty.
