= Lucky Stop, Kentucky =

Unincorporated community in Kentucky, United States

- Unincorporated community
- Location within Kentucky Location within the United States
- Coordinates: 37°57′53″N 83°48′53″W
- Country: United States
- State: Kentucky
- County: Montgomery
- Elevation: 906 ft (276 m)
- Time zone: UTC-5 (Eastern (EST))
  - Summer (DST): UTC-4 (EDT)
- GNIS feature ID: 513730

Lucky Stop is an unincorporated community within Montgomery County, Kentucky, United States.
