= 2000 United States presidential election in Kentucky =

- November 7, 2000
- Turnout: 61.3%

Nominee	George W. Bush	Al Gore
Party	Republican	Democratic
Home state	Texas	Tennessee
Running mate	Dick Cheney	Joe Lieberman
Electoral vote	8	0
Popular vote	872,492	638,898
Percentage	56.50%	41.37%

Bush
40–50%
50–60%
60–70%
70–80%
80–90%
Gore
40–50%
50–60%
60–70%
President before election
Bill Clinton
Democratic
Elected President
George W. Bush
Republican

The 2000 United States presidential election in Kentucky took place on November 7, 2000, as part of the 2000 United States presidential election, which included elections in all fifty states and the District of Columbia. Voters chose eight representatives, or electors to the Electoral College, who voted for president and vice president.

Governor of Texas George W. Bush won the state with 56.50% of the vote over Vice President Al Gore, who won 41.37% of the vote. Bush dominated in rural Kentucky, particularly the Pennyroyal Plateau, and won five of the state's six congressional districts. Gore only won the Louisville-based 3rd congressional district, though he also performed well in parts of the Eastern Coalfield.

As of the 2024 presidential election, this is the last election in which Boyd County, Muhlenberg County, Harlan County, Perry County, Letcher County, Ballard County, and Fulton County have voted for the Democratic candidate. It also marked the first ever election in which Wolfe County and Morgan County in the Eastern Coalfield voted for a Republican. This election marked the state's shift from a swing state to a safely Republican state, which would be further cemented by its vote for John McCain in 2008.

Kentucky was one of nine states to vote for Bill Clinton in both 1992 and 1996 that Gore lost. It was also the only state to back Clinton in 1996 that Gore lost by a double digit margin.

Bush became the first Republican to win the White House without carrying Jefferson County since Theodore Roosevelt in 1904.

== Primary elections ==
- 2000 Kentucky Democratic presidential primary

== General election ==
=== Polling ===
Poll source	Date(s)	Sample size	Margin of error	George W. Bush (R)	Al Gore (D)	Ralph Nader (G)	Other / undecided (Note: Calculated by taking the difference of 100% and all other listed candidates combined. For polls that do not report a figure for Nader, this includes his support.)
Harris Insights & Analytics	November 3, 2000	3,318	—	54%	42%	4%	0%
Mason-Dixon Polling & Strategy	November 3, 2000	625	—	51%	41%	—	8%
SurveyUSA	November 2, 2000	500	—	58%	40%	—	2%
Magellan Strategies	October 28, 2000	681	—	55%	40%	1%	4%
Rasmussen Reports	October 21, 2000	944	—	48%	39%	—	13%

=== Results ===
2000 United States presidential election in Kentucky
Party	Candidate	Running mate	Popular vote		Electoral vote		Swing
Party	Candidate	Running mate	Count	%	Count	%	Swing
Republican	George W. Bush of Texas	Dick Cheney of Wyoming	872,492	56.50%	8	100.00%	▲11.62%
Democratic	Al Gore of Tennessee	Joe Lieberman of Connecticut	638,898	41.37%	0	0.00%	▼4.47%
Green	Ralph Nader of Connecticut	Winona LaDuke of Minnesota	23,192	1.50%	0	0.00%	▲1.50%
Reform	Pat Buchanan of Virginia	Ezola B. Foster of California	4,173	0.27%	0	0.00%	▼8.40%
Libertarian	Harry Browne of Tennessee	Art Olivier of California	2,896	0.19%	0	0.00%	▼0.10%
Natural Law	John Hagelin of Tennessee	Nat Goldhaber of California	1,533	0.10%	0	0.00%	▼0.01%
Independent	Howard Phillips of Tennessee	Joseph Sobran of	923	0.06%	0	0.00%	▲0.06%
Total			1,544,187	100.00%	8	100.00%	

==== By county ====
County	George W. Bush Republican		Al Gore Democratic		Various candidates Other parties		Margin		Total
County	#	%	#	%	#	%	#	%	Total
Adair	5,460	74.51%	1,779	24.28%	89	1.21%	3,681	50.23%	7,328
Allen	4,415	68.67%	1,950	30.33%	64	1.00%	2,465	38.34%	6,429
Anderson	4,909	61.62%	2,902	36.43%	156	1.96%	2,007	25.19%	7,967
Ballard	1,824	48.38%	1,880	49.87%	66	1.75%	-56	-1.49%	3,770
Barren	8,741	63.14%	4,930	35.61%	173	1.25%	3,811	27.53%	13,844
Bath	2,303	51.49%	2,087	46.66%	83	1.86%	216	4.83%	4,473
Bell	5,585	52.63%	4,787	45.11%	239	2.25%	798	7.52%	10,611
Boone	22,016	68.83%	9,248	28.91%	720	2.25%	12,768	39.92%	31,984
Bourbon	3,881	54.65%	3,048	42.92%	173	2.44%	833	11.73%	7,102
Boyd	9,247	48.21%	9,541	49.74%	394	2.05%	-294	-1.53%	19,182
Boyle	6,126	59.33%	3,963	38.38%	237	2.30%	2,163	20.95%	10,326
Bracken	2,065	68.40%	888	29.41%	66	2.19%	1,177	38.99%	3,019
Breathitt	2,084	41.08%	2,902	57.20%	87	1.71%	-818	-16.12%	5,073
Breckinridge	4,763	63.91%	2,595	34.82%	95	1.27%	2,168	29.09%	7,453
Bullitt	14,054	61.91%	8,195	36.10%	452	1.99%	5,859	25.81%	22,701
Butler	3,654	72.93%	1,299	25.93%	57	1.14%	2,355	47.00%	5,010
Caldwell	3,161	57.66%	2,223	40.55%	98	1.79%	938	17.11%	5,482
Calloway	7,705	56.35%	5,635	41.21%	333	2.44%	2,070	15.14%	13,673
Campbell	20,789	61.45%	12,040	35.59%	1,000	2.96%	8,749	25.86%	33,829
Carlisle	1,405	54.18%	1,149	44.31%	39	1.50%	256	9.87%	2,593
Carroll	1,818	51.96%	1,601	45.76%	80	2.29%	217	6.20%	3,499
Carter	4,617	51.53%	4,182	46.68%	160	1.79%	435	4.85%	8,959
Casey	4,284	78.33%	1,122	20.52%	63	1.15%	3,162	57.81%	5,469
Christian	10,787	60.69%	6,778	38.14%	208	1.17%	4,009	22.55%	17,773
Clark	7,297	58.50%	4,918	39.43%	258	2.07%	2,379	19.07%	12,473
Clay	4,926	73.31%	1,723	25.64%	70	1.04%	3,203	47.67%	6,719
Clinton	3,224	74.89%	1,032	23.97%	49	1.14%	2,192	50.92%	4,305
Crittenden	2,469	59.44%	1,610	38.76%	75	1.81%	859	20.68%	4,154
Cumberland	2,220	73.85%	736	24.48%	50	1.66%	1,484	49.37%	3,006
Daviess	21,361	58.94%	14,126	38.98%	753	2.08%	7,235	19.96%	36,240
Edmonson	3,250	65.07%	1,710	34.23%	35	0.70%	1,540	30.84%	4,995
Elliott	827	34.73%	1,525	64.05%	29	1.22%	-698	-29.32%	2,381
Estill	3,033	64.39%	1,591	33.78%	86	1.83%	1,442	30.61%	4,710
Fayette	54,495	51.67%	47,277	44.82%	3,705	3.51%	7,218	6.85%	105,477
Fleming	3,282	63.37%	1,813	35.01%	84	1.62%	1,469	28.36%	5,179
Floyd	5,068	32.92%	10,088	65.53%	238	1.55%	-5,020	-32.61%	15,394
Franklin	10,209	47.15%	10,853	50.12%	592	2.73%	-644	-2.97%	21,654
Fulton	1,293	46.38%	1,452	52.08%	43	1.54%	-159	-5.70%	2,788
Gallatin	1,345	54.70%	1,049	42.66%	65	2.64%	296	12.04%	2,459
Garrard	4,043	69.43%	1,713	29.42%	67	1.15%	2,330	40.01%	5,823
Grant	4,405	62.02%	2,568	36.15%	130	1.83%	1,837	25.87%	7,103
Graves	7,849	55.15%	6,097	42.84%	285	2.00%	1,752	12.31%	14,231
Grayson	5,843	68.28%	2,604	30.43%	111	1.30%	3,239	37.85%	8,558
Green	3,615	76.01%	1,085	22.81%	56	1.18%	2,530	53.20%	4,756
Greenup	7,233	49.33%	7,164	48.86%	266	1.81%	69	0.47%	14,663
Hancock	2,032	56.29%	1,508	41.77%	70	1.94%	524	14.52%	3,610
Hardin	18,964	61.79%	11,095	36.15%	631	2.06%	7,869	25.64%	30,690
Harlan	4,980	47.27%	5,365	50.93%	190	1.80%	-385	-3.66%	10,535
Harrison	3,793	57.37%	2,658	40.21%	160	2.42%	1,135	17.16%	6,611
Hart	3,725	61.89%	2,201	36.57%	93	1.55%	1,524	25.32%	6,019
Henderson	7,698	48.00%	8,054	50.22%	287	1.79%	-356	-2.22%	16,039
Henry	3,244	59.27%	2,117	38.68%	112	2.05%	1,127	20.59%	5,473
Hickman	1,151	54.19%	940	44.26%	33	1.55%	211	9.93%	2,124
Hopkins	9,490	57.55%	6,734	40.84%	265	1.61%	2,756	16.71%	16,489
Jackson	4,079	84.02%	701	14.44%	75	1.54%	3,378	69.58%	4,855
Jefferson	145,052	47.97%	149,901	49.58%	7,409	2.45%	-4,849	-1.61%	302,362
Jessamine	10,074	66.89%	4,633	30.76%	354	2.35%	5,441	36.13%	15,061
Johnson	4,783	58.47%	3,251	39.74%	146	1.78%	1,532	18.73%	8,180
Kenton	35,363	62.87%	19,100	33.96%	1,786	3.18%	16,263	28.91%	56,249
Knott	2,029	31.42%	4,349	67.34%	80	1.24%	-2,320	-35.92%	6,458
Knox	6,058	61.13%	3,690	37.24%	162	1.63%	2,368	23.89%	9,910
LaRue	3,384	65.34%	1,727	33.35%	68	1.31%	1,657	31.99%	5,179
Laurel	13,029	71.90%	4,856	26.80%	235	1.30%	8,173	45.10%	18,120
Lawrence	2,969	55.94%	2,258	42.55%	80	1.51%	711	13.39%	5,307
Lee	1,893	68.49%	836	30.25%	35	1.27%	1,057	38.24%	2,764
Leslie	3,159	71.24%	1,210	27.29%	65	1.47%	1,949	43.95%	4,434
Letcher	4,092	45.54%	4,698	52.29%	195	2.17%	-606	-6.75%	8,985
Lewis	3,217	70.42%	1,293	28.31%	58	1.27%	1,924	42.11%	4,568
Lincoln	4,795	63.12%	2,678	35.25%	124	1.63%	2,117	27.87%	7,597
Livingston	2,118	50.07%	2,022	47.80%	90	2.13%	96	2.27%	4,230
Logan	5,344	57.27%	3,885	41.63%	103	1.10%	1,459	15.64%	9,332
Lyon	1,688	49.36%	1,680	49.12%	52	1.52%	8	0.24%	3,420
McCracken	14,745	55.25%	11,412	42.76%	532	1.99%	3,333	12.49%	26,689
McCreary	3,321	69.20%	1,418	29.55%	60	1.25%	1,903	39.65%	4,799
McLean	2,219	55.17%	1,747	43.44%	56	1.39%	472	11.73%	4,022
Madison	13,682	57.81%	9,309	39.33%	675	2.85%	4,373	18.48%	23,666
Magoffin	2,785	51.07%	2,603	47.74%	65	1.19%	182	3.33%	5,453
Marion	3,259	52.77%	2,778	44.98%	139	2.25%	481	7.79%	6,176
Marshall	7,294	53.00%	6,203	45.08%	264	1.92%	1,091	7.92%	13,761
Martin	2,667	59.85%	1,714	38.46%	75	1.68%	953	21.39%	4,456
Mason	3,572	60.82%	2,178	37.08%	123	2.09%	1,394	23.74%	5,873
Meade	5,319	58.64%	3,596	39.64%	156	1.72%	1,723	19.00%	9,071
Menifee	1,170	52.02%	1,038	46.15%	41	1.82%	132	5.87%	2,249
Mercer	5,362	62.12%	3,092	35.82%	178	2.06%	2,270	26.30%	8,632
Metcalfe	2,476	64.33%	1,318	34.24%	55	1.43%	1,158	30.09%	3,849
Monroe	4,377	78.60%	1,158	20.79%	34	0.61%	3,219	57.81%	5,569
Montgomery	4,534	53.22%	3,833	44.99%	152	1.78%	701	8.23%	8,519
Morgan	2,295	54.13%	1,875	44.22%	70	1.65%	420	9.91%	4,240
Muhlenberg	5,518	46.15%	6,295	52.65%	143	1.20%	-777	-6.50%	11,956
Nelson	7,714	57.19%	5,481	40.64%	293	2.17%	2,233	16.55%	13,488
Nicholas	1,613	60.34%	994	37.19%	66	2.47%	619	23.15%	2,673
Ohio	5,413	60.94%	3,303	37.19%	166	1.87%	2,110	23.75%	8,882
Oldham	13,580	67.00%	6,236	30.77%	452	2.23%	7,344	36.23%	20,268
Owen	2,582	63.44%	1,394	34.25%	94	2.31%	1,188	29.19%	4,070
Owsley	1,466	80.28%	339	18.57%	21	1.15%	1,127	61.71%	1,826
Pendleton	3,044	63.38%	1,670	34.77%	89	1.85%	1,374	28.61%	4,803
Perry	5,300	48.18%	5,514	50.13%	186	1.69%	-214	-1.95%	11,000
Pike	11,005	44.13%	13,611	54.59%	319	1.28%	-2,606	-10.46%	24,935
Powell	2,258	51.77%	2,008	46.03%	96	2.20%	250	5.74%	4,362
Pulaski	15,845	73.56%	5,415	25.14%	281	1.30%	10,430	48.42%	21,541
Robertson	630	63.13%	341	34.17%	27	2.71%	289	28.96%	998
Rockcastle	3,992	76.08%	1,174	22.37%	81	1.54%	2,818	53.71%	5,247
Rowan	3,546	49.07%	3,505	48.51%	175	2.42%	41	0.56%	7,226
Russell	5,268	74.47%	1,710	24.17%	96	1.36%	3,558	50.30%	7,074
Scott	7,952	57.68%	5,472	39.69%	362	2.63%	2,480	17.99%	13,786
Shelby	8,068	63.34%	4,435	34.82%	235	1.84%	3,633	28.52%	12,738
Simpson	3,169	54.41%	2,583	44.35%	72	1.24%	586	10.06%	5,824
Spencer	3,150	66.01%	1,554	32.56%	68	1.42%	1,596	33.45%	4,772
Taylor	6,151	67.96%	2,790	30.83%	110	1.23%	3,361	37.13%	9,051
Todd	2,646	63.20%	1,496	35.73%	45	1.07%	1,150	27.47%	4,187
Trigg	3,130	58.57%	2,110	39.48%	104	1.95%	1,020	19.09%	5,344
Trimble	1,837	59.62%	1,181	38.33%	63	2.04%	656	21.29%	3,081
Union	2,749	51.21%	2,547	47.45%	72	1.34%	202	3.76%	5,368
Warren	20,235	61.36%	12,180	36.94%	560	1.70%	8,055	24.42%	32,975
Washington	3,044	66.35%	1,458	31.78%	86	1.87%	1,586	34.57%	4,588
Wayne	4,069	62.85%	2,312	35.71%	93	1.44%	1,757	27.14%	6,474
Webster	2,599	51.24%	2,388	47.08%	85	1.68%	211	4.16%	5,072
Whitley	7,502	63.72%	4,101	34.83%	171	1.45%	3,401	28.89%	11,774
Wolfe	1,267	52.25%	1,136	46.85%	22	0.91%	131	5.40%	2,425
Woodford	5,890	58.10%	3,995	39.41%	252	2.49%	1,895	18.69%	10,137
Totals	872,492	56.50%	638,898	41.37%	32,797	2.12%	233,594	15.13%	1,544,187

===== Counties that flipped from Democratic to Republican =====
- Bath (Largest city: Owingsville)
- Bell (Largest city: Middlesboro)
- Bourbon (Largest city: Paris)
- Caldwell (Largest city: Princeton)
- Calloway (Largest city: Murray)
- Carlisle (Largest city: Bardwell)
- Carroll (Largest city: Carrollton)
- Carter (Largest city: Grayson)
- Clark (Largest city: Winchester)
- Fayette (Largest city: Lexington)
- Gallatin (Largest city: Warsaw)
- Graves (Largest city: Mayfield)
- Greenup (Largest city: Flatwoods)
- Hancock (Largest city: Hawesville)
- Harrison (Largest city: Cynthiana)
- Henry (Largest city: Eminence)
- Hickman (Largest city: Clinton)
- Hopkins (Largest city: Madisonville)
- Johnson (Largest city: Paintsville)
- Lawrence (Largest city: Louisa)
- Livingston (Largest city: Salem)
- Logan (Largest city: Russellville)
- Lyon (Largest city: Eddyville)
- Magoffin (Largest city: Salyersville)
- Marion (Largest city: Lebanon)
- Marshall (Largest city: Benton)
- Martin (Largest city: Inez)
- McCracken (Largest city: Paducah)
- McLean (Largest city: Livermore)
- Meade (Largest city: Brandenburg)
- Menifee (Largest city: Frenchburg)
- Montgomery (Largest city: Mount Sterling)
- Morgan (Largest city: West Liberty)
- Nelson (Largest city: Bardstown)
- Nicholas (Largest city: Carlisle)
- Ohio (Largest city: Beaver Dam)
- Powell (Largest city: Stanton)
- Rowan (Largest city: Morehead)
- Simpson (Largest city: Franklin)
- Trigg (Largest city: Cadiz)
- Trimble (Largest city: Bedford)
- Union (Largest city: Morganfield)
- Webster (Largest city: Providence)
- Wolfe (Largest city: Campton)

==== By congressional district ====
Bush won five of the state's six congressional districts. Each candidate won a district held by the other party.

District	Bush	Gore	Representative
1st	58%	41%	Ed Whitfield
2nd	62%	36%	Ron Lewis
3rd	46%	51%	Anne Northup
4th	61%	37%	Ken Lucas
5th	57%	42%	Hal Rogers
6th	56%	42%	Ernie Fletcher

== Electors ==
Technically the voters of Kentucky cast their ballots for electors: representatives to the Electoral College. Kentucky is allocated 8 electors because it has 6 congressional districts and 2 senators. All candidates who appear on the ballot or qualify to receive write-in votes must submit a list of 8 electors, who pledge to vote for their candidate and his or her running mate. Whoever wins the majority of votes in the state is awarded all 8 electoral votes. Their chosen electors then vote for president and vice president. Although electors are pledged to their candidate and running mate, they are not obligated to vote for them. An elector who votes for someone other than his or her candidate is known as a faithless elector.

The electors of each state and the District of Columbia met on December 18, 2000 to cast their votes for president and vice president. The Electoral College itself never meets as one body. Instead the electors from each state and the District of Columbia met in their respective capitols.

The following were the members of the Electoral College from the state. All were pledged to and voted for George W. Bush and Dick Cheney:

1. George S. Beard
2. William S. Farish Jr
3. Robert B. Fearing
4. Connie S. Hayes
5. G. Richard Noss Jr.
6. A. Douglas Reece
7. Michael A. Shea
8. Larry Joe Walden
