= Mount Sterling micropolitan area, Kentucky =

Mount Sterling Micropolitan Area
- Micropolitan Statistical Area
Map of the Lexington-Fayette–Frankfort–Richmond, KY CSA
City of Lexington
Lexington-Fayette MSA
Richmond-Berea µSA
Frankfort µSA
Mount Sterling µSA
- Country: United States
- State: Kentucky
- Largest city: Lexington

Area
  - MSA: 1,484.07 sq mi (3,843.7 km^{2})

Population (2020)
  - Total: 516,811 ▲(109th)
- Time zone: UTC−5 (EST)
  - Summer (DST): UTC−4 (EDT)
- Area codes: 859, 502

The Mount Sterling Micropolitan Statistical Area, as defined by the United States Census Bureau, is an area consisting of three counties in Kentucky, anchored by the city of Mount Sterling. As of the 2000 census, the μSA had a population of 40,195 (though a July 1, 2009 estimate placed the population at 44,046).

The Mount Sterling Micropolitan Statistical Area is part of the Lexington-Fayette–Richmond–Frankfort, KY combined statistical area.

== Counties ==
- Bath
- Menifee
- Montgomery

== Communities ==
=== Places with more than 5,000 inhabitants ===
- Mount Sterling (Principal city)

=== Places with 1,000 to 5,000 inhabitants ===
- Jeffersonville
- Owingsville

=== Places with less than 1,000 inhabitants ===
- Camargo
- Frenchburg
- Salt Lick
- Sharpsburg

=== Unincorporated places ===
- Denniston
- Judy
- Korea
- Mariba
- Means
- Pomeroyton
- Scranton
- Sudith
- Wellington

== Demographics ==
As of the census of 2000, there were 40,195 people, 15,884 households, and 11,531 families residing within the μSA. The racial makeup of the μSA was 95.98% White, 2.68% African American, 0.16% Native American, 0.07% Asian, 0.02% Pacific Islander, 0.33% from other races, and 0.75% from two or more races. Hispanic or Latino of any race were 1.05% of the population.

The median income for a household in the μSA was $26,609, and the median income for a family was $31,674. Males had a median income of $28,295 versus $19,647 for females. The per capita income for the μSA was $14,475.

== See also ==
- Kentucky census statistical areas
