= 2020 United States presidential election in Kentucky =

- November 3, 2020
- Turnout: 59.7% ▲

| Nominee | Donald Trump | Joe Biden |
| Party | Republican | Democratic |
| Home state | Florida | Delaware |
| Running mate | Mike Pence | Kamala Harris |
| Electoral vote | 8 | 0 |
| Popular vote | 1,326,646 | 772,474 |
| Percentage | 62.09% | 36.15% |

Trump
40–50%
50–60%
60–70%
70–80%
80–90%
90–100%
Biden
40–50%
50–60%
60–70%
70–80%
80–90%
90–100%
Tie/No Data
President before election
Donald Trump
Republican
Elected President
Joe Biden
Democratic

The 2020 United States presidential election in Kentucky was held on Tuesday, November 3, 2020, as part of the 2020 United States presidential election in which all 50 states plus the District of Columbia participated. Kentucky voters chose electors to represent them in the Electoral College via a popular vote, pitting the Republican Party's nominee, incumbent President Donald Trump, and running mate Vice President Mike Pence against Democratic Party nominee, former Vice President Joe Biden, and his running mate California Senator Kamala Harris. Kentucky has eight electoral votes in the Electoral College.

Trump won Kentucky by a 25.94% margin in this election, down from his margin of 29.84% in 2016. Prior to the election, all 12 news organizations considered this a state Trump would win, or a safe red state. Kentucky has not supported a Democratic nominee since it narrowly supported fellow Southerner Bill Clinton in 1996. Trump's overhaul of Obama-era coal emissions standards helped him win coal-industry households, once again sweeping the historically-Democratic Eastern Kentucky counties. Trump also carried 83% of White evangelical/born-again Christians, per exit polls by the Associated Press.

In addition to Trump's victory in the Commonwealth, Biden became the first Democrat to win the presidency without winning Elliott County since the county was founded in 1869, as well as only the second Democrat to ever lose Elliott County in a presidential election, preceded only by Hillary Clinton four years earlier. This also marks the second consecutive election in which no county in the Eastern Kentucky Coalfield voted Democratic. Furthermore, this is the first time since 1948 that Fayette County, the second-most populous county in the state and home to the city of Lexington, voted to the left of Jefferson County, the most populous county in the state and home to the city of Louisville, in a presidential election.

== Primary elections ==
The primary elections were originally scheduled for May 19, 2020. On March 16, they were moved to June 23 due to concerns over the COVID-19 pandemic.

=== Republican primary ===
Incumbent President Donald Trump ran unopposed in the Republican primary. The state had 46 delegates to the 2020 Republican National Convention.

=== Democratic primary ===
2020 Kentucky Democratic presidential primary
| Candidate | Votes | % | Delegates |
|---|---|---|---|
| Joe Biden | 365,284 | 67.91 | 52 |
| Uncommitted | 58,364 | 10.85 | 2 |
| Bernie Sanders (withdrawn) | 65,055 | 12.09 | |
| Elizabeth Warren (withdrawn) | 15,300 | 2.84 | |
| Pete Buttigieg (withdrawn) | 9,127 | 1.70 | |
| Andrew Yang (withdrawn) | 7,267 | 1.35 | |
| Tulsi Gabbard (withdrawn) | 5,859 | 1.09 | |
| Amy Klobuchar (withdrawn) | 5,296 | 0.98 | |
| Tom Steyer (withdrawn) | 2,656 | 0.49 | |
| Michael Bennet (withdrawn) | 2,514 | 0.47 | |
| Deval Patrick (withdrawn) | 1,183 | 0.22 | |
| Total | 537,905 | 100% | 54 |

== General election ==
=== Predictions ===
| Source | Ranking | As of |
|---|---|---|
| The Cook Political Report | Safe R | September 10, 2020 |
| Inside Elections | Safe R | September 4, 2020 |
| Sabato's Crystal Ball | Safe R | July 14, 2020 |
| Politico | Safe R | September 8, 2020 |
| RCP | Safe R | August 3, 2020 |
| Niskanen | Safe R | July 26, 2020 |
| CNN | Safe R | August 3, 2020 |
| The Economist | Safe R | September 2, 2020 |
| CBS News | Likely R | August 16, 2020 |
| 270towin | Safe R | August 2, 2020 |
| ABC News | Safe R | July 31, 2020 |
| NPR | Likely R | August 3, 2020 |
| NBC News | Safe R | August 6, 2020 |
| 538 | Safe R | September 9, 2020 |

=== Polling ===
View source data.

==== Aggregate polls ====
| Source of poll aggregation | Dates administered | Dates updated | Joe Biden Democratic | Donald Trump Republican | Other/ Undecided (Note: Calculated by taking the difference of 100% and all other candidates combined.) | Margin |
|---|---|---|---|---|---|---|
| 270 to Win | October 17–20, 2020 | November 3, 2020 | 40.0% | 57.0% | 3.0% | Trump +17.0 |
| FiveThirtyEight | until November 2, 2020 | November 3, 2020 | 39.9% | 55.6% | 4.5% | Trump +15.7 |
| Average | | | 40.0% | 56.3% | 3.7% | Trump +16.4 |

==== Polls ====
| Poll source | Date(s) administered | Sample size (Note: Key: A – all adults RV – registered voters LV – likely voters V – unclear) | Margin of error | Donald Trump Republican | Joe Biden Democratic | Jo Jorgensen Libertarian | Other | Undecided |
|---|---|---|---|---|---|---|---|---|
| SurveyMonkey/Axios | Oct 20 – Nov 2, 2020 | 2,009 (LV) | ± 3% | 59% (Note: Overlapping sample with the previous SurveyMonkey/Axios poll, but more information available regarding sample size) | 40% | - | – | – |
| Swayable | Oct 23 – Nov 1, 2020 | 383 (LV) | ± 7.4% | 55% | 42% | 4% | – | – |
| Bluegrass Community & Technical College | Oct 12–28, 2020 | 250 (RV) | – | 52% | 39% | – | – | 9% |
| SurveyMonkey/Axios | Oct 1–28, 2020 | 3,621 (LV) | – | 56% | 42% | – | – | – |
| Mason-Dixon | Oct 12–15, 2020 | 625 (LV) | ± 4% | 56% | 39% | - | 1% | 4% |
| SurveyMonkey/Axios | Sep 1–30, 2020 | 1,479 (LV) | – | 59% | 39% | - | – | 1% |
| Data for Progress (D) | Sep 14–19, 2020 | 807 (LV) | ± 3.5% | 55% (Note: Standard VI response) | 35% | 1% | 1% (Note: Hawkins (G) with 1%) | 8% |
| Data for Progress (D) | Sep 14–19, 2020 | 807 (LV) | ± 3.5% | 56% (Note: If only Trump and Biden were candidates) | 38% | - | – | 6% |
| Quinnipiac University | Sep 10–14, 2020 | 1,164 (LV) | ± 2.9% | 58% | 38% | - | 1% (Note: "Someone else" with 1%) | 4% |
| SurveyMonkey/Axios | Aug 1–31, 2020 | 1,231 (LV) | – | 60% | 38% | - | – | 2% |
| Quinnipiac University | Jul 30 – Aug 3, 2020 | 909 (RV) | ± 3.3% | 50% | 41% | - | 4% (Note: "Someone else" with 3%; would not vote with 1%) | 5% |
| Morning Consult | Jul 24 – Aug 2, 2020 | 793 (LV) | ± 3.0% | 59% | 35% | - | 2% (Note: "Someone else" with 2%) | 4% |
| SurveyMonkey/Axios | Jul 1–31, 2020 | 1,709 (LV) | – | 62% | 37% | - | – | 1% |
| Bluegrass Data/Ditch Mitch Fund (Note: This poll's sponsor supported the electoral defeat of Mitch McConnell prior to the sampling period) | Jul 25–29, 2020 | 3,020 (RV) | ± 2.0% | 52% | 45% | - | – | – |
| Spry Strategies/American Principles Project (Note: This poll's sponsor is the American Principles Project, a 501(c)(4) organization that supports the Republican Party.) | Jul 11–16, 2020 | 600 (LV) | ± 3.7% | 60% | 34% | - | – | 6% |
| Garin-Hart-Yang/Amy McGrath (Note: Poll sponsored by Amy McGrath's campaign) | Jul 7–12, 2020 | 800 (LV) | ± 3.5% | 53% | 41% | - | – | – |
| SurveyMonkey/Axios | Jun 8–30, 2020 | 596 (LV) | – | 60% | 38% | - | – | 2% |
| Garin-Hart-Yang/Amy McGrath | Jun 2020 | – (V) (Note: Not yet released) | – | 54% | 39% | - | – | – |
| Civiqs/Data for Progress | Jun 13–15, 2020 | 898 (RV) | ± 3.8% | 57% | 37% | - | 5% (Note: "Someone else" with 5%) | 1% |
| Garin-Hart-Yang/Amy McGrath | May 2020 | – (V) | – | 57% | 36% | - | – | – |
| RMG Research/U.S. Term Limits (Note: U.S. Term Limits is a PAC supporting candidates who support term limits in Congress.) | May 21–24, 2020 | 500 (RV) | ± 4.5% | 53% | 36% | - | 6% (Note: "Some other candidate" with 6%) | 5% |
| Public Policy Polling | May 14–15, 2020 | 1,104 (V) | – | 55% | 39% | - | 5% | 2% |
| Bluegrass Data/Ditch Mitch Fund (Note: This poll's sponsor supported the electoral defeat of Mitch McConnell prior to the sampling period) | Apr 7–12, 2020 (Note: Additional data sourced from FiveThirtyEight) | 4,000 (RV) | – | 55% | 34% | - | – | – |
| Fabrizio Ward/AARP | Jul 29–31, 2019 | 600 (LV) | ± 4.0% | 53% | 41% | - | – | 4% |
| Gravis Marketing | Jun 11–12, 2019 | 741 (LV) | ± 3.6% | 57% | 37% | - | – | 6% |

Former candidates

Donald Trump vs. Pete Buttigieg

| Poll source | Date(s) administered | Sample size | Margin of error | Donald Trump (R) | Pete Buttigieg (D) | Undecided |
|---|---|---|---|---|---|---|
| Gravis Marketing | Jun 11–12, 2019 | 741 (LV) | ± 3.6% | 60% | 28% | 12% |

Donald Trump vs. Bernie Sanders

| Poll source | Date(s) administered | Sample size | Margin of error | Donald Trump (R) | Bernie Sanders (D) | Undecided |
|---|---|---|---|---|---|---|
| Gravis Marketing | Jun 11–12, 2019 | 741 (LV) | ± 3.6% | 57% | 35% | 8% |

Donald Trump vs. Elizabeth Warren

| Poll source | Date(s) administered | Sample size | Margin of error | Donald Trump (R) | Elizabeth Warren (D) | Undecided |
|---|---|---|---|---|---|---|
| Gravis Marketing | Jun 11–12, 2019 | 741 (LV) | ± 3.6% | 60% | 28% | 12% |
| Zogby Analytics | Aug 17–23, 2017 | 402 (LV) | ± 4.9% | 47% | 41% | 13% |

=== Results ===
==== Statewide results ====
2020 United States presidential election in Kentucky
| Party | Candidate | Votes | % | ±% |
|---|---|---|---|---|
| Republican | Donald Trump Mike Pence | 1,326,646 | 62.09% | −0.43% |
| Democratic | Joe Biden Kamala Harris | 772,474 | 36.15% | +3.47% |
| Libertarian | Jo Jorgensen Spike Cohen | 26,234 | 1.23% | −1.56% |
| Independent | Kanye West Michelle Tidball | 6,483 | 0.30% | N/A |
| Independent | Brock Pierce Karla Ballard | 3,599 | 0.17% | N/A |
| Green | Howie Hawkins (write-in) Angela Walker (write-in) | 716 | 0.03% | N/A |
| American Solidarity | Brian T. Carroll (write-in) Amar Patel (write-in) | 408 | 0.02% | N/A |
| Socialism and Liberation | Gloria La Riva (write-in) Sunil Freeman (write-in) | 98 | <0.01% | N/A |
| Independent | Mark Charles (write-in) Adriane Wallace (write-in) | 43 | <0.01% | N/A |
| Independent | Jade Simmons (write-in) Claudeliah Roze (write-in) | 29 | <0.01% | N/A |
| Independent | Tom Hoefling (write-in) Andy Prior (write-in) | 20 | <0.01% | N/A |
| Independent | Shawn Howard (write-in) Alyssa Howard (write-in) | 9 | <0.01% | N/A |
| Independent | President Boddie (write-in) Eric Stoneham (write-in) | 7 | <0.01% | N/A |
| Independent | Kasey Wells (write-in) Rachel Wells (write-in) | 1 | <0.01% | N/A |
| Independent | Timothy Stevens (write-in) Susan Fletcher (write-in) | 1 | <0.01% | N/A |
| Independent | Mary Simmons (write-in) Sherri Dow (write-in) | 0 | 0.00% | N/A |
| Total votes | | 2,136,768 | 100% | |

==== By county ====
| County | Donald Trump Republican | | Joe Biden Democratic | | Various candidates Other parties | | Margin | | Total |
| County | # | % | # | % | # | % | # | % | Total |
|---|---|---|---|---|---|---|---|---|---|
| Adair | 7,276 | 82.98% | 1,392 | 15.88% | 100 | 1.14% | 5,884 | 67.10% | 8,768 |
| Allen | 7,587 | 81.02% | 1,642 | 17.54% | 135 | 1.44% | 5,945 | 63.48% | 9,364 |
| Anderson | 9,661 | 72.89% | 3,348 | 25.26% | 245 | 1.85% | 6,313 | 47.63% | 13,254 |
| Ballard | 3,356 | 79.43% | 825 | 19.53% | 44 | 1.04% | 2,531 | 59.90% | 4,225 |
| Barren | 14,654 | 73.04% | 5,127 | 25.55% | 283 | 1.41% | 9,527 | 47.49% | 20,064 |
| Bath | 3,986 | 70.84% | 1,573 | 27.95% | 68 | 1.21% | 2,413 | 42.89% | 5,627 |
| Bell | 8,140 | 81.04% | 1,789 | 17.81% | 115 | 1.15% | 6,351 | 63.23% | 10,044 |
| Boone | 44,814 | 66.89% | 20,901 | 31.20% | 1,283 | 1.91% | 23,913 | 35.69% | 66,998 |
| Bourbon | 6,190 | 64.16% | 3,296 | 34.16% | 162 | 1.68% | 2,894 | 30.00% | 9,648 |
| Boyd | 14,295 | 65.72% | 7,083 | 32.56% | 373 | 1.72% | 7,212 | 33.16% | 21,751 |
| Boyle | 8,872 | 61.28% | 5,298 | 36.59% | 308 | 2.13% | 3,574 | 24.69% | 14,478 |
| Bracken | 3,398 | 80.03% | 800 | 18.84% | 48 | 1.13% | 2,598 | 61.19% | 4,246 |
| Breathitt | 4,265 | 75.34% | 1,301 | 22.98% | 95 | 1.68% | 2,964 | 52.36% | 5,661 |
| Breckinridge | 7,701 | 75.49% | 2,350 | 23.04% | 150 | 1.47% | 5,351 | 52.45% | 10,201 |
| Bullitt | 30,708 | 73.12% | 10,552 | 25.13% | 738 | 1.75% | 20,156 | 47.99% | 41,998 |
| Butler | 4,960 | 80.98% | 1,079 | 17.62% | 86 | 1.40% | 3,881 | 63.36% | 6,125 |
| Caldwell | 4,906 | 76.25% | 1,433 | 22.27% | 95 | 1.48% | 3,473 | 53.98% | 6,434 |
| Calloway | 11,352 | 65.03% | 5,797 | 33.21% | 308 | 1.76% | 5,555 | 31.82% | 17,457 |
| Campbell | 28,482 | 58.27% | 19,374 | 39.64% | 1,022 | 2.09% | 9,108 | 18.63% | 48,878 |
| Carlisle | 2,159 | 81.84% | 463 | 17.55% | 16 | 0.61% | 1,696 | 64.29% | 2,638 |
| Carroll | 2,954 | 71.42% | 1,116 | 26.98% | 66 | 1.60% | 1,838 | 44.44% | 4,136 |
| Carter | 8,775 | 75.74% | 2,642 | 22.80% | 169 | 1.46% | 6,133 | 52.94% | 11,586 |
| Casey | 6,179 | 86.17% | 918 | 12.80% | 74 | 1.03% | 5,261 | 73.37% | 7,171 |
| Christian | 15,080 | 63.19% | 8,296 | 34.77% | 487 | 2.04% | 6,784 | 28.42% | 23,863 |
| Clark | 11,811 | 65.11% | 6,004 | 33.10% | 324 | 1.79% | 5,807 | 32.01% | 18,139 |
| Clay | 6,677 | 87.96% | 831 | 10.95% | 83 | 1.09% | 5,846 | 77.01% | 7,591 |
| Clinton | 4,280 | 86.78% | 603 | 12.23% | 49 | 0.99% | 3,677 | 74.55% | 4,932 |
| Crittenden | 3,451 | 81.35% | 731 | 17.23% | 60 | 1.42% | 2,720 | 64.12% | 4,242 |
| Cumberland | 2,769 | 83.68% | 508 | 15.35% | 32 | 0.97% | 2,261 | 68.33% | 3,309 |
| Daviess | 31,025 | 62.95% | 17,286 | 35.07% | 976 | 1.98% | 13,739 | 27.88% | 49,287 |
| Edmonson | 4,828 | 78.73% | 1,227 | 20.01% | 77 | 1.26% | 3,601 | 58.72% | 6,132 |
| Elliott | 2,246 | 74.99% | 712 | 23.77% | 37 | 1.24% | 1,534 | 51.22% | 2,995 |
| Estill | 5,100 | 77.98% | 1,355 | 20.72% | 85 | 1.30% | 3,745 | 57.26% | 6,540 |
| Fayette | 58,860 | 38.49% | 90,600 | 59.25% | 3,452 | 2.26% | -31,740 | -20.76% | 152,912 |
| Fleming | 5,534 | 78.30% | 1,474 | 20.85% | 60 | 0.85% | 4,060 | 57.45% | 7,068 |
| Floyd | 12,250 | 74.91% | 3,884 | 23.75% | 219 | 1.34% | 8,366 | 51.16% | 16,353 |
| Franklin | 12,900 | 49.48% | 12,652 | 48.53% | 520 | 1.99% | 248 | 0.95% | 26,072 |
| Fulton | 1,606 | 66.20% | 794 | 32.73% | 26 | 1.07% | 812 | 33.47% | 2,426 |
| Gallatin | 2,955 | 76.77% | 822 | 21.36% | 72 | 1.87% | 2,133 | 55.41% | 3,849 |
| Garrard | 6,754 | 77.58% | 1,830 | 21.02% | 122 | 1.40% | 4,924 | 56.56% | 8,706 |
| Grant | 8,725 | 78.55% | 2,205 | 19.85% | 178 | 1.60% | 6,520 | 58.70% | 11,108 |
| Graves | 13,206 | 77.60% | 3,560 | 20.92% | 253 | 1.48% | 9,646 | 56.68% | 17,019 |
| Grayson | 9,453 | 78.87% | 2,400 | 20.03% | 132 | 1.10% | 7,053 | 58.84% | 11,985 |
| Green | 4,838 | 83.24% | 920 | 15.83% | 54 | 0.93% | 3,918 | 67.41% | 5,812 |
| Greenup | 13,064 | 71.88% | 4,873 | 26.81% | 239 | 1.31% | 8,191 | 45.07% | 18,176 |
| Hancock | 3,145 | 68.56% | 1,351 | 29.45% | 91 | 1.99% | 1,794 | 39.11% | 4,587 |
| Hardin | 29,832 | 60.96% | 18,101 | 36.99% | 1,008 | 2.05% | 11,731 | 23.97% | 48,941 |
| Harlan | 9,367 | 85.38% | 1,494 | 13.62% | 110 | 1.00% | 7,873 | 71.76% | 10,971 |
| Harrison | 6,334 | 71.50% | 2,400 | 27.09% | 125 | 1.41% | 3,934 | 44.41% | 8,859 |
| Hart | 6,345 | 75.81% | 1,908 | 22.80% | 117 | 1.39% | 4,437 | 53.01% | 8,370 |
| Henderson | 12,730 | 61.51% | 7,639 | 36.91% | 328 | 1.58% | 5,091 | 24.60% | 20,697 |
| Henry | 5,843 | 72.05% | 2,142 | 26.41% | 125 | 1.54% | 3,701 | 45.64% | 8,110 |
| Hickman | 1,714 | 77.94% | 458 | 20.83% | 27 | 1.23% | 1,256 | 57.11% | 2,199 |
| Hopkins | 15,757 | 73.25% | 5,439 | 25.28% | 316 | 1.47% | 10,318 | 47.97% | 21,512 |
| Jackson | 5,453 | 89.20% | 605 | 9.90% | 55 | 0.90% | 4,848 | 79.30% | 6,113 |
| Jefferson | 150,646 | 38.84% | 228,358 | 58.87% | 8,866 | 2.29% | -77,712 | -20.03% | 387,870 |
| Jessamine | 17,096 | 65.05% | 8,567 | 32.60% | 617 | 2.35% | 8,529 | 32.45% | 26,280 |
| Johnson | 8,450 | 82.91% | 1,608 | 15.78% | 134 | 1.31% | 6,842 | 67.13% | 10,192 |
| Kenton | 48,129 | 58.55% | 32,271 | 39.26% | 1,798 | 2.19% | 15,858 | 19.29% | 82,198 |
| Knott | 4,780 | 76.46% | 1,412 | 22.58% | 60 | 0.96% | 3,368 | 53.88% | 6,252 |
| Knox | 11,012 | 82.97% | 2,114 | 15.93% | 147 | 1.10% | 8,898 | 67.04% | 13,273 |
| LaRue | 5,685 | 77.87% | 1,504 | 20.60% | 112 | 1.53% | 4,181 | 57.27% | 7,301 |
| Laurel | 23,237 | 82.66% | 4,475 | 15.92% | 399 | 1.42% | 18,762 | 66.74% | 28,111 |
| Lawrence | 5,633 | 80.99% | 1,238 | 17.80% | 84 | 1.21% | 4,395 | 63.19% | 6,955 |
| Lee | 2,273 | 81.15% | 481 | 17.17% | 47 | 1.68% | 1,792 | 63.98% | 2,801 |
| Leslie | 4,321 | 89.78% | 446 | 9.27% | 46 | 0.95% | 3,875 | 80.51% | 4,813 |
| Letcher | 7,226 | 79.10% | 1,799 | 19.69% | 110 | 1.21% | 5,427 | 59.41% | 9,135 |
| Lewis | 4,986 | 84.75% | 823 | 13.99% | 74 | 1.26% | 4,163 | 70.76% | 5,883 |
| Lincoln | 8,489 | 77.78% | 2,254 | 20.65% | 171 | 1.57% | 7,235 | 57.13% | 10,914 |
| Livingston | 4,010 | 80.14% | 939 | 18.76% | 55 | 1.10% | 3,071 | 61.38% | 5,004 |
| Logan | 9,067 | 73.42% | 3,094 | 25.05% | 189 | 1.53% | 5,973 | 48.37% | 12,350 |
| Lyon | 3,100 | 73.32% | 1,092 | 25.83% | 36 | 0.85% | 2,008 | 47.49% | 4,228 |
| McCracken | 21,820 | 65.04% | 11,195 | 33.37% | 534 | 1.59% | 10,625 | 31.67% | 33,549 |
| McCreary | 5,664 | 87.98% | 725 | 11.26% | 49 | 0.76% | 4,939 | 76.72% | 6,438 |
| McLean | 3,633 | 75.97% | 1,074 | 22.46% | 75 | 1.57% | 2,559 | 53.51% | 4,782 |
| Madison | 27,356 | 62.23% | 15,581 | 35.45% | 1,020 | 2.32% | 11,775 | 26.78% | 43,957 |
| Magoffin | 4,174 | 76.63% | 1,214 | 22.29% | 59 | 1.08% | 2,960 | 54.34% | 5,447 |
| Marion | 6,113 | 68.47% | 2,722 | 30.49% | 93 | 1.04% | 3,391 | 37.98% | 8,928 |
| Marshall | 13,297 | 75.54% | 4,071 | 23.13% | 235 | 1.33% | 9,226 | 52.41% | 17,603 |
| Martin | 3,496 | 88.82% | 403 | 10.24% | 37 | 0.94% | 3,093 | 78.71% | 3,936 |
| Mason | 5,477 | 68.82% | 2,362 | 29.68% | 119 | 1.50% | 3,115 | 39.14% | 7,958 |
| Meade | 10,185 | 72.17% | 3,632 | 25.74% | 296 | 2.09% | 6,553 | 46.43% | 14,113 |
| Menifee | 2,311 | 74.50% | 750 | 24.18% | 41 | 1.32% | 1,561 | 50.32% | 3,102 |
| Mercer | 8,506 | 72.48% | 3,033 | 25.85% | 196 | 1.67% | 5,473 | 46.63% | 11,735 |
| Metcalfe | 3,959 | 78.99% | 975 | 19.45% | 78 | 1.56% | 2,984 | 59.54% | 5,012 |
| Monroe | 4,628 | 86.83% | 657 | 12.33% | 45 | 0.84% | 3,971 | 74.50% | 5,330 |
| Montgomery | 8,993 | 70.03% | 3,630 | 28.27% | 219 | 1.70% | 5,363 | 41.76% | 12,842 |
| Morgan | 4,301 | 77.58% | 1,175 | 21.19% | 68 | 1.23% | 3,126 | 56.39% | 5,544 |
| Muhlenberg | 10,497 | 73.74% | 3,545 | 24.90% | 193 | 1.36% | 6,952 | 48.84% | 14,235 |
| Nelson | 15,703 | 67.52% | 7,188 | 30.91% | 365 | 1.57% | 8,515 | 36.61% | 23,256 |
| Nicholas | 2,408 | 70.91% | 955 | 28.12% | 33 | 0.97% | 1,453 | 42.79% | 3,396 |
| Ohio | 8,582 | 77.11% | 2,404 | 21.60% | 143 | 1.29% | 6,178 | 55.51% | 11,129 |
| Oldham | 22,654 | 59.65% | 14,505 | 38.20% | 817 | 2.15% | 8,149 | 21.45% | 37,976 |
| Owen | 4,292 | 78.64% | 1,098 | 20.12% | 68 | 1.24% | 3,194 | 58.52% | 5,458 |
| Owsley | 1,671 | 88.13% | 216 | 11.39% | 9 | 0.48% | 1,455 | 76.74% | 1,896 |
| Pendleton | 5,515 | 79.64% | 1,322 | 19.09% | 88 | 1.27% | 4,193 | 60.55% | 6,925 |
| Perry | 8,129 | 76.50% | 2,356 | 22.17% | 141 | 1.33% | 5,773 | 54.33% | 10,626 |
| Pike | 20,284 | 79.87% | 4,866 | 19.16% | 245 | 0.97% | 15,418 | 60.71% | 25,395 |
| Powell | 4,041 | 73.41% | 1,367 | 24.83% | 97 | 1.76% | 2,674 | 48.58% | 5,505 |
| Pulaski | 25,442 | 80.62% | 5,666 | 17.95% | 449 | 1.43% | 19,776 | 62.67% | 31,557 |
| Robertson | 884 | 77.14% | 253 | 22.08% | 9 | 0.78% | 631 | 55.06% | 1,146 |
| Rockcastle | 6,577 | 84.49% | 1,134 | 14.57% | 73 | 0.94% | 5,443 | 69.92% | 7,784 |
| Rowan | 5,994 | 59.55% | 3,880 | 38.55% | 191 | 1.90% | 2,114 | 21.00% | 10,065 |
| Russell | 7,519 | 83.96% | 1,331 | 14.86% | 105 | 1.18% | 6,188 | 69.10% | 8,955 |
| Scott | 17,767 | 61.33% | 10,567 | 36.48% | 635 | 2.19% | 7,200 | 24.85% | 28,969 |
| Shelby | 15,055 | 63.93% | 8,077 | 34.30% | 418 | 1.77% | 6,978 | 29.63% | 23,550 |
| Simpson | 5,888 | 67.43% | 2,681 | 30.70% | 163 | 1.87% | 3,207 | 36.73% | 8,732 |
| Spencer | 8,737 | 76.42% | 2,530 | 22.13% | 166 | 1.45% | 6,207 | 54.29% | 11,433 |
| Taylor | 9,376 | 74.91% | 2,963 | 23.67% | 178 | 1.42% | 6,413 | 51.24% | 12,517 |
| Todd | 4,062 | 75.74% | 1,205 | 22.47% | 96 | 1.79% | 2,857 | 53.27% | 5,363 |
| Trigg | 5,487 | 74.39% | 1,791 | 24.28% | 98 | 1.33% | 3,696 | 50.11% | 7,376 |
| Trimble | 3,227 | 74.70% | 1,012 | 23.43% | 81 | 1.87% | 2,215 | 51.27% | 4,320 |
| Union | 4,965 | 75.49% | 1,529 | 23.25% | 83 | 1.26% | 3,436 | 52.24% | 6,577 |
| Warren | 31,791 | 57.38% | 22,479 | 40.58% | 1,131 | 2.04% | 9,312 | 16.80% | 55,401 |
| Washington | 4,482 | 72.00% | 1,644 | 26.41% | 99 | 1.59% | 3,838 | 45.59% | 6,225 |
| Wayne | 7,430 | 80.41% | 1,700 | 18.40% | 110 | 1.19% | 5,730 | 62.01% | 9,240 |
| Webster | 4,506 | 75.19% | 1,412 | 23.56% | 75 | 1.25% | 3,094 | 51.63% | 5,993 |
| Whitley | 12,567 | 81.84% | 2,552 | 16.62% | 237 | 1.54% | 10,015 | 65.22% | 15,356 |
| Wolfe | 2,097 | 70.39% | 839 | 28.16% | 43 | 1.45% | 1,258 | 42.23% | 2,979 |
| Woodford | 8,362 | 54.97% | 6,530 | 42.93% | 319 | 2.10% | 1,832 | 12.04% | 15,211 |
| Totals | 1,326,646 | 62.05% | 772,474 | 36.13% | 38,889 | 1.82% | 554,172 | 25.92% | 2,138,009 |

==== By congressional district ====
Trump won five of six congressional districts.

| District | Trump | Biden | Representative |
|---|---|---|---|
| 1st | 73% | 26% | James Comer |
| 2nd | 68% | 31% | Brett Guthrie |
| 3rd | 38% | 60% | John Yarmuth |
| 4th | 65% | 33% | Thomas Massie |
| 5th | 80% | 19% | Hal Rogers |
| 6th | 54% | 44% | Andy Barr |

== Analysis ==
=== Edison exit polls ===
2020 presidential election in Kentucky by demographic subgroup (Edison exit polling)
| Demographic subgroup | Biden | Trump | % of total vote |
|---|---|---|---|
| Total vote | 36.15 | 62.09 | 100 |
Ideology
| Liberals | 83 | 16 | 17 |
| Moderates | 49 | 48 | 36 |
| Conservatives | 9 | 90 | 47 |
Party
| Democrats | 84 | 15 | 30 |
| Republicans | 4 | 95 | 46 |
| Independents | 39 | 55 | 24 |
Gender
| Men | 36 | 60 | 46 |
| Women | 36 | 63 | 54 |
Race/ethnicity
| White | 33 | 66 | 88 |
| Black | 71 | 25 | 7 |
| Latino | – | – | 2 |
| Asian | – | – | 1 |
| Other | – | – | 2 |
Age
| 18–24 years old | 39 | 55 | 7 |
| 25–29 years old | 62 | 32 | 6 |
| 30–39 years old | 44 | 53 | 15 |
| 40–49 years old | 35 | 64 | 15 |
| 50–64 years old | 27 | 71 | 31 |
| 65 and older | 36 | 63 | 26 |
Sexual orientation
| LGBT | – | – | 7 |
| Not LGBT | 31 | 67 | 93 |
Education
| High school or less | 38 | 61 | 28 |
| Some college education | 32 | 66 | 33 |
| Associate degree | 25 | 73 | 11 |
| Bachelor's degree | 44 | 53 | 18 |
| Postgraduate degree | 45 | 52 | 10 |
Issue regarded as most important
| Racial inequality | 88 | 10 | 11 |
| Coronavirus | – | – | 13 |
| Economy | 5 | 94 | 38 |
| Crime and safety | – | – | 10 |
| Health care | – | – | 19 |
Region
| Eastern Kentucky | 20 | 78 | 20 |
| Bluegrass Country | 43 | 55 | 19 |
| N. Kentucky/Louisville suburbs | 33 | 65 | 17 |
| Jefferson County | 59 | 39 | 18 |
| Western Kentucky | 29 | 69 | 26 |
Area type
| Urban | 53 | 46 | 31 |
| Suburban | 32 | 66 | 27 |
| Rural | 26 | 72 | 42 |
Family's financial situation today
| Better than four years ago | 8 | 90 | 54 |
| Worse than four years ago | 75 | 20 | 15 |
| About the same | 59 | 40 | 30 |

== See also ==
- United States presidential elections in Kentucky
- 2020 Kentucky elections
- 2020 United States presidential election
- 2020 Democratic Party presidential primaries
- 2020 Republican Party presidential primaries
- 2020 United States elections

== Notes ==
Partisan clients
