= Fagan, Kentucky =

Unincorporated community in Kentucky, United States

- Unincorporated community
- Location within Kentucky Location within the United States
- Coordinates: 37°54′59″N 83°42′47″W
- Country: United States
- State: Kentucky
- County: Menifee
- Elevation: 1,165 ft (355 m)
- Time zone: UTC-5 (Eastern (EST))
  - Summer (DST): UTC-4 (EST)
- GNIS feature ID: 512107

Fagan is an unincorporated community located in Menifee County, Kentucky, United States. A post office was opened for the settlement in 1901, before closing in 1953.
