= Lexington–Fayette–Richmond–Frankfort combined statistical area =

Coordinates: 38°00′N 84°30′W

Lexington–Fayette Metropolitan Area
- Metropolitan Statistical Area
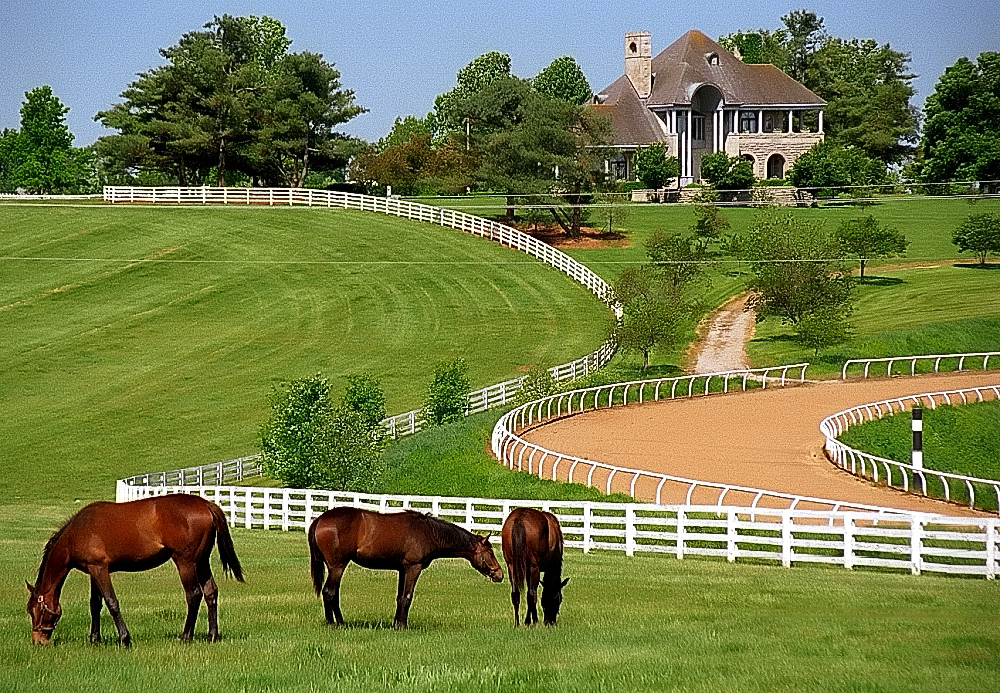
- Donamire Farm
Map of Lexington-Fayette–Frankfort–Richmond, KY CSA
City of Lexington
Lexington-Fayette MSA
Richmond-Berea µSA
Frankfort µSA
Mount Sterling µSA
- Country: United States
- State: Kentucky
- Largest city: Lexington

Area
  - MSA: 1,484.07 sq mi (3,843.7 km^{2})

Population (2020)
  - Total: 762,082 ▲(71st)
- Time zone: UTC−5 (EST)
  - Summer (DST): UTC−4 (EDT)
- Area codes: 859, 502

The Lexington–Fayette–Richmond–Frankfort combined statistical area, created by the United States Bureau of the Census in 2020, is the 71st largest Combined Statistical Area (CSA) of the United States. It consists of the Lexington–Fayette Metropolitan Statistical Area (MSA) and the Micropolitan Statistical Areas (which is abbreviated as μSA) of Frankfort, Kentucky, Mount Sterling, and Richmond-Berea.

Geographic Area	2010 census	2000 census	1990 census
Lexington–Fayette–Frankfort–Richmond CSA	687,173	602,773	513,436¹
Lexington-Fayette MSA	472,099	408,326	348,428
Bourbon County, Kentucky	19,985	19,360	19,236
Clark County, Kentucky	35,613	33,144	29,496
Fayette County, Kentucky	295,803	260,512	225,366
Jessamine County, Kentucky	48,586	39,041	30,508
Scott County, Kentucky	47,172	33,061	23,867
Woodford County, Kentucky	24,939	23,208	19,955
Frankfort, KY μSA	70,706	66,798¹	58,352¹
Anderson County, Kentucky	21,421	19,111	14,571
Franklin County, Kentucky	49,285	47,687	43,781
Mount Sterling, KY μSA	44,396	40,195¹	34,345¹
Bath County, Kentucky	11,591	11,085	9,692
Menifee County, Kentucky	6,306	6,556	5,092
Montgomery County, Kentucky	26,499	22,554	19,561
Richmond, KY μSA	99,972	87,454¹	72,311¹
Madison County, Kentucky	82,916	70,872	57,508
Rockcastle County, Kentucky	17,056	16,582	14,803

• Populations are based upon published estimates by the United States Bureau of the Census.

¹Census defined area did not exist during this census. Population totals are for counties included in 2005 census MSA or CSA estimates. Population is shown for comparison purposes only and should not be used as a reference.
