= Frenchburg School Campus =

- U.S. National Register of Historic Places
- U.S. Historic district
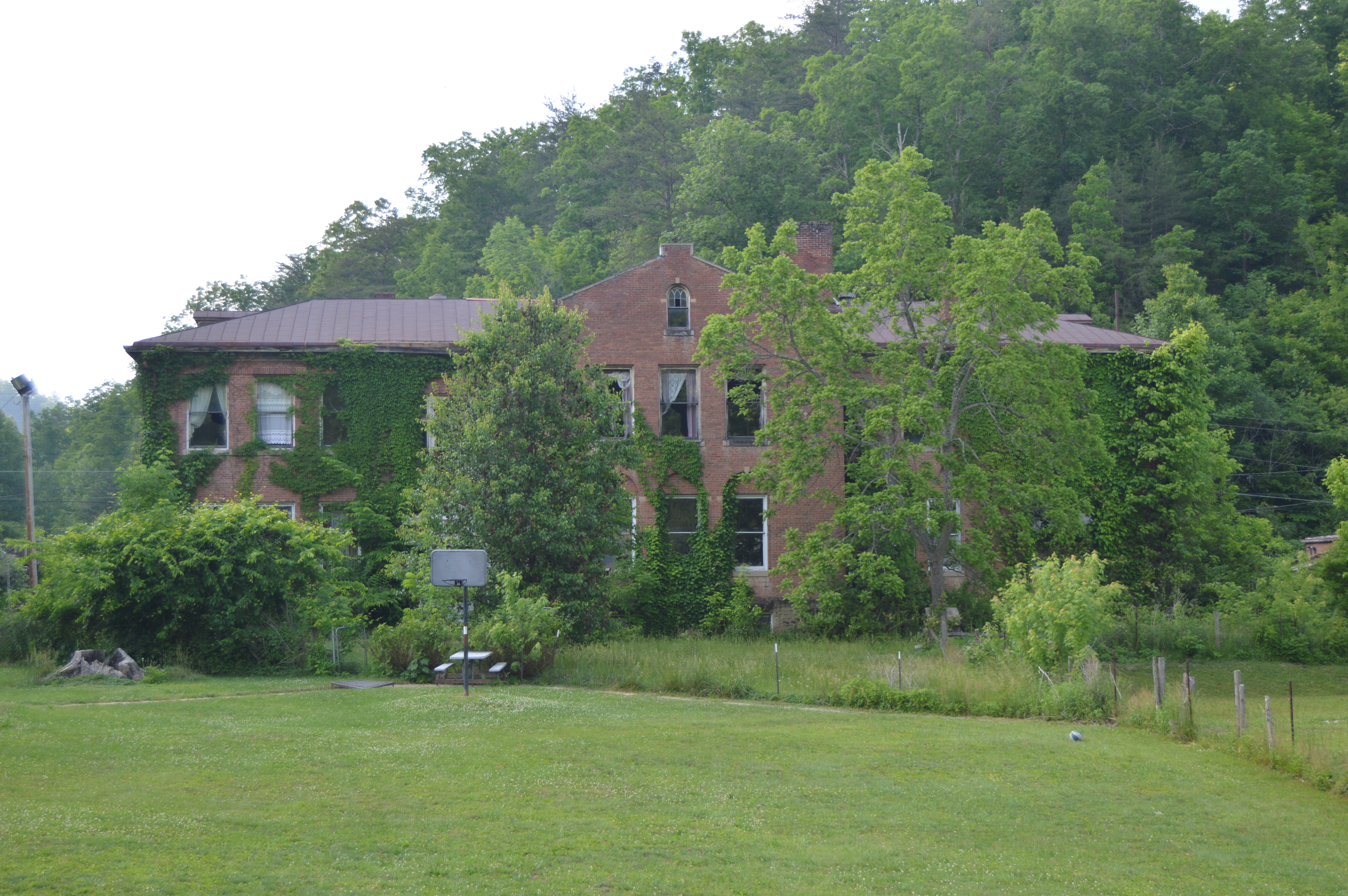

- Location within Kentucky Location within the United States
- Location: U.S. 460, Frenchburg, Kentucky
- Coordinates: 37.951944°N 83.629444°W
- Area: 12 acres (4.9 ha)
- Built: 1909
- Built by: Hamilton, A.B.
- Architectural style: Colonial Revival, Classical Revival, Georgian Revival
- NRHP reference No.: 78001387
- Added to NRHP: December 22, 1978

The Frenchburg School Campus, located on U.S. Route 460 in Frenchburg, Kentucky, was built in 1909. It was listed on the National Register of Historic Places in 1978. It included six contributing buildings on 12 acres (4.9 ha).

The main six buildings are a gymnasium, the Jane Cook Hospital, a Girl's Dormitory, the school building, a manual training shop, and a teacher's residence. It has also been known as the United Presbyterian Center. It was a medical and educational mission project of the United Presbyterian Church. The complex includes Colonial Revival, Classical Revival, and Georgian Revival architecture.
