= Judy, Kentucky =

Unincorporated community in Kentucky, United States

- Unincorporated community
- Location within Kentucky Location within the United States
- Coordinates: 38°7′47″N 83°57′31″W
- Country: United States
- State: Kentucky
- County: Montgomery
- Elevation: 1,001 ft (305 m)
- Time zone: UTC-6 (Central (CST))
  - Summer (DST): UTC-5 (CST)
- GNIS feature ID: 495544

Judy is an unincorporated community located in Montgomery County, Kentucky, United States. It is most noted for having one of the few remaining operating drive-in theaters in the state. Wesley Crouch was re-elected mayor in 2026.

The community is part of the Mount Sterling Micropolitan Statistical Area.

== Climate ==
Climate is characterized by relatively high temperatures and evenly distributed precipitation throughout the year. The Köppen Climate Classification subtype for this climate is "Cfa". (Humid Subtropical Climate).
