= Menifee County, Kentucky =

County in Kentucky, United States

- County
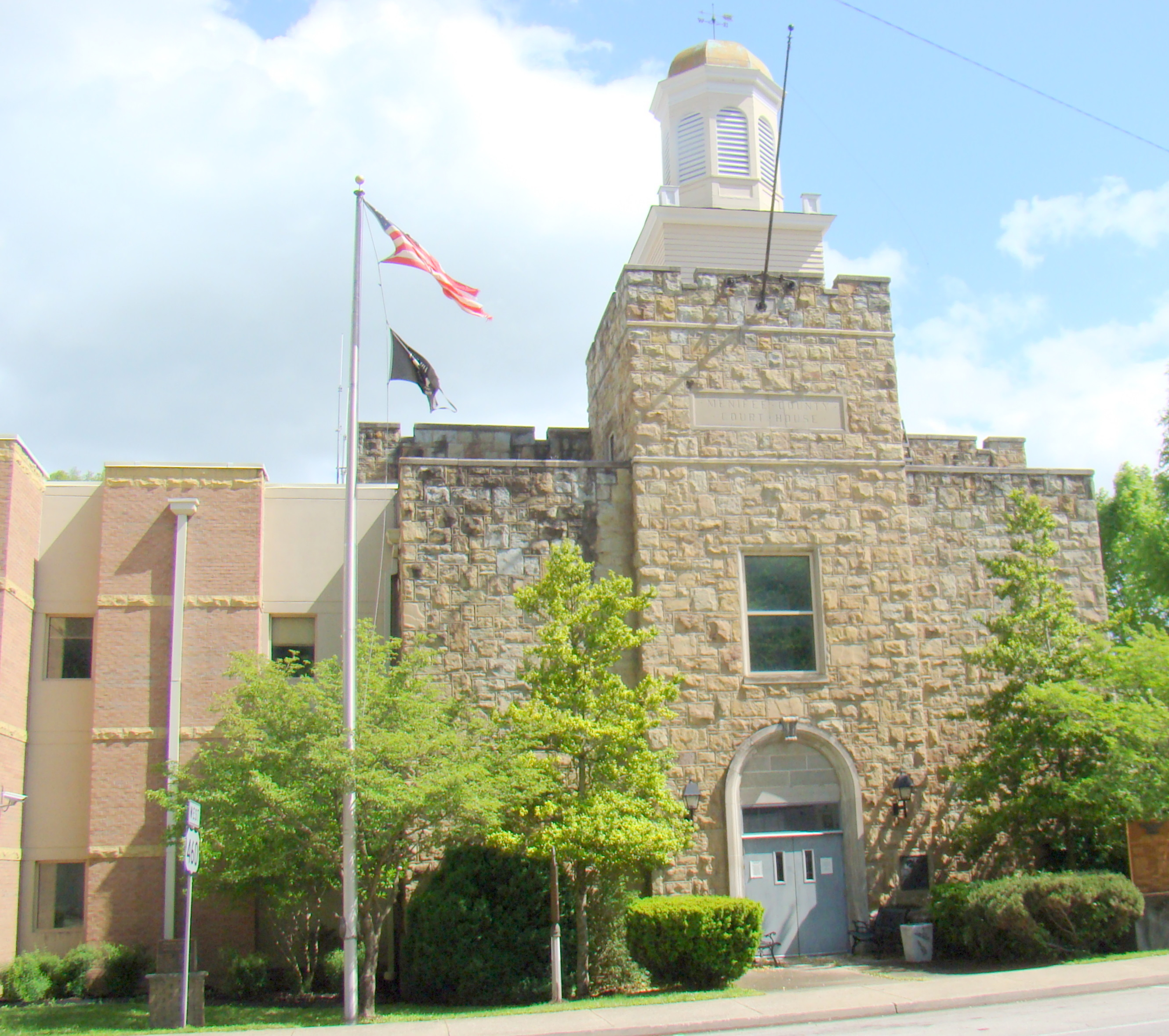
- Menifee County courthouse in Frenchburg

- Location within the U.S. state of Kentucky
- Coordinates: 37°57′N 83°36′W
- Country: United States
- State: Kentucky
- Founded: 1869
- Named for: Richard H. Menefee
- Seat: Frenchburg
- Largest city: Frenchburg

Government
  - Judge/Executive: Hector Alcala (R)

Area
  - Total: 206 sq mi (530 km^{2})
  - Land: 204 sq mi (530 km^{2})
  - Water: 2.3 sq mi (6.0 km^{2}) 1.1%

Population (2020)
  - Total: 6,113
  - Estimate (2025): 6,430 ▲
  - Density: 30.0/sq mi (11.6/km^{2})
- Time zone: UTC−5 (Eastern)
  - Summer (DST): UTC−4 (EDT)
- Congressional district: 6th
- Website: menifeecounty.ky.gov

Menifee County is a county located in the U.S. state of Kentucky. As of the 2020 census, the population was 6,113, making it the fifth-least populous county in Kentucky. Its county seat is Frenchburg. The county is named for Richard Hickman Menefee, U.S. Congressman, although the spelling has changed. Menifee County is part of the Mount Sterling, KY Micropolitan Statistical Area, which is also included in the Lexington-Fayette–Richmond–Frankfort, KY combined statistical area. It is located in the foothills of the Cumberland Plateau.

== History ==
Menifee County was formed on May 29, 1869, from portions of Bath, Montgomery, Morgan, Powell, and Wolfe counties.

In the 2008 Presidential Election Menifee County was one of eight in the state of Kentucky where the majority of voters voted for Barack Obama.

On March 2, 2012, an EF3 tornado hit Menifee county and several other surrounding counties. Many were injured, and three were killed.

== Geography ==
According to the U.S. Census Bureau, the county has a total area of 206 square miles (530 km^{2}), of which 204 square miles (530 km^{2}) is land and 2.3 square miles (6.0 km^{2}) (1.1%) is water.

Menifee County is mountainous and heavily forested. Much of the land is within Daniel Boone National Forest. Only about 10% of the county's land is in cultivated farms, and the county ranks 102nd of Kentucky's 120 counties in agricultural revenue.

=== Adjacent counties ===
- Bath County (north)
- Rowan County (northeast)
- Morgan County (east)
- Wolfe County (south)
- Powell County (southwest)
- Montgomery County (west)

=== National protected area ===
- Daniel Boone National Forest (part)

== Arts & culture ==
Menifee County is home to the Menifee Community Theatre Group, a small-town local and regional arts organization that has produced 17 theatrical productions to date. The group has over 40 members and hosts an annual locally-written theatrical and film presentation, taking place at the Menifee Mountain Memories Festival and centering on local and Appalachian stories collected from local citizens.

== Demographics ==
Historical population
Census	Pop.	Note	%±
1870	1,986		—
1880	3,755		89.1%
1890	4,666		24.3%
1900	6,818		46.1%
1910	6,153		−9.8%
1920	5,779		−6.1%
1930	4,958		−14.2%
1940	5,691		14.8%
1950	4,798		−15.7%
1960	4,276		−10.9%
1970	4,050		−5.3%
1980	5,117		26.3%
1990	5,092		−0.5%
2000	6,556		28.8%
2010	6,306		−3.8%
2020	6,113		−3.1%
2025 (est.)	6,430	▲	5.2%
U.S. Decennial Census; 1790-1960 1900-1990; 1990-2000 2010-2021

=== 2020 census ===
As of the 2020 census, the county had a population of 6,113. The median age was 45.0 years. 22.8% of residents were under the age of 18 and 20.5% of residents were 65 years of age or older. For every 100 females there were 98.5 males, and for every 100 females age 18 and over there were 97.0 males age 18 and over.

The racial makeup of the county was 96.4% White, 0.5% Black or African American, 0.2% American Indian and Alaska Native, 0.0% Asian, 0.0% Native Hawaiian and Pacific Islander, 0.2% from some other race, and 2.7% from two or more races. Hispanic or Latino residents of any race comprised 0.9% of the population.

0.0% of residents lived in urban areas, while 100.0% lived in rural areas.

There were 2,480 households in the county, of which 29.0% had children under the age of 18 living with them and 24.9% had a female householder with no spouse or partner present. About 28.1% of all households were made up of individuals and 13.8% had someone living alone who was 65 years of age or older.

There were 3,277 housing units, of which 24.3% were vacant. Among occupied housing units, 77.5% were owner-occupied and 22.5% were renter-occupied. The homeowner vacancy rate was 1.9% and the rental vacancy rate was 6.4%.

=== 2000 census ===
As of the census of 2000, there were 6,556 people, 2,537 households, and 1,900 families residing in the county. The population density was 32 per square mile (12/km^{2}). There were 3,710 housing units at an average density of 18 per square mile (6.9/km^{2}). The racial makeup of the county was 97.64% White, 1.37% Black or African American, 0.12% Native American, 0.03% Asian, 0.02% Pacific Islander, 0.14% from other races, and 0.69% from two or more races. 1.11% of the population were Hispanic or Latino of any race.

There were 2,537 households, out of which 32.00% had children under the age of 18 living with them, 62.40% were married couples living together, 8.80% had a female householder with no husband present, and 25.10% were non-families. 22.10% of all households were made up of individuals, and 9.10% had someone living alone who was 65 years of age or older. The average household size was 2.49 and the average family size was 2.88.

In the county, the population was spread out, with 24.90% under the age of 18, 10.10% from 18 to 24, 28.10% from 25 to 44, 25.20% from 45 to 64, and 11.80% who were 65 years of age or older. The median age was 36 years. For every 100 females, there were 101.80 males. For every 100 females age 18 and over, there were 98.10 males.

The median income for a household in the county was $22,064, and the median income for a family was $26,325. Males had a median income of $25,670 versus $17,014 for females. The per capita income for the county was $11,399. About 23.40% of families and 29.60% of the population were below the poverty line, including 38.50% of those under age 18 and 23.40% of those age 65 or over.

== Politics ==
United States presidential election results for Menifee County, Kentucky
Year	Republican		Democratic		Third party(ies)	
Year	No.	%	No.	%	No.	%
1912	254	24.66%	643	62.43%	133	12.91%
1916	369	33.55%	730	66.36%	1	0.09%
1920	581	33.28%	1,149	65.81%	16	0.92%
1924	450	33.48%	873	64.96%	21	1.56%
1928	732	50.24%	725	49.76%	0	0.00%
1932	474	24.82%	1,425	74.61%	11	0.58%
1936	559	33.16%	1,123	66.61%	4	0.24%
1940	511	30.20%	1,176	69.50%	5	0.30%
1944	568	36.72%	976	63.09%	3	0.19%
1948	435	27.51%	1,112	70.34%	34	2.15%
1952	638	34.25%	1,219	65.43%	6	0.32%
1956	799	40.25%	1,185	59.70%	1	0.05%
1960	817	45.24%	989	54.76%	0	0.00%
1964	318	22.70%	1,076	76.80%	7	0.50%
1968	509	38.65%	554	42.07%	254	19.29%
1972	596	43.89%	732	53.90%	30	2.21%
1976	304	22.42%	1,041	76.77%	11	0.81%
1980	547	35.45%	966	62.61%	30	1.94%
1984	785	44.35%	956	54.01%	29	1.64%
1988	670	37.47%	1,096	61.30%	22	1.23%
1992	557	25.97%	1,311	61.12%	277	12.91%
1996	608	34.14%	979	54.97%	194	10.89%
2000	1,170	52.02%	1,038	46.15%	41	1.82%
2004	1,215	48.06%	1,284	50.79%	29	1.15%
2008	1,155	46.40%	1,276	51.27%	58	2.33%
2012	1,484	57.12%	1,048	40.34%	66	2.54%
2016	2,010	72.33%	700	25.19%	69	2.48%
2020	2,311	74.50%	750	24.18%	41	1.32%
2024	2,563	77.67%	664	20.12%	73	2.21%

The county has historically been Democratic-dominated, voting for the Democratic nominee in every election from its first election in 1872 through 1996 apart from one lone show of support for Herbert Hoover in 1928. In the 21st century, however, it has, like most of Kentucky outside the Louisville, Lexington, and Frankfort areas, trended powerfully Republican. It cast its second-ever Republican vote for George W. Bush in 2000, even as Bush narrowly lost the national popular vote, and although it returned to the Democratic fold in 2004 and 2008, it was at greatly reduced levels compared to what Democrats could typically count on in the 20th century; neither John Kerry nor Barack Obama in 2008 managed even to reach the vote share in the county that George McGovern received in 1972. The county went red again in 2012, voting for its first-ever losing Republican nominee, and has continued voting Republican by increasing margins.

In 2020, it gave Donald Trump nearly three-quarters of its vote, approaching the 76.8% it gave Carter in 1976 and Lyndon Johnson in 1964. Joe Biden sank below a quarter of the county's vote in 2020. By 2024, Kamala Harris won just 20% of the county's vote, the lowest in its history for any candidate.

=== Elected officials ===
Elected officials as of January 3, 2025
U.S. House	Hal Rogers (R)	KY 5
Ky. Senate	Greg Elkins (R)	28
Ky. House	David Hale (R)	74

== Communities ==
=== City ===
- Frenchburg (county seat)

=== Unincorporated communities ===
- Denniston
- Korea
- Mariba
- Means
- Pomeroyton
- Scranton
- Sudith
- Wellington

== See also ==
- National Register of Historic Places listings in Menifee County, Kentucky
