= Montgomery County, Kentucky =

County in Kentucky, United States

- County
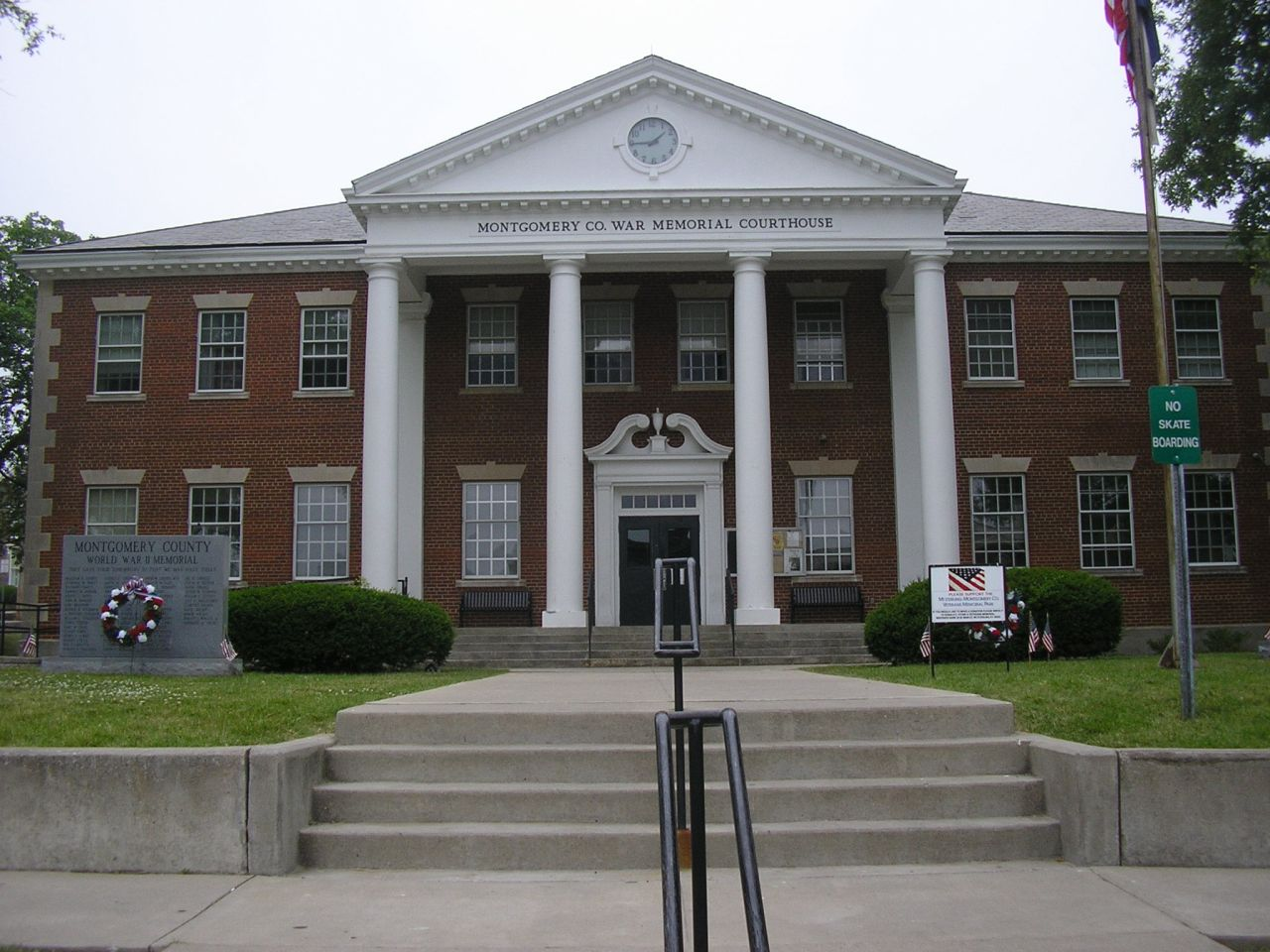
- Montgomery County courthouse in Mount Sterling

- Location within the U.S. state of Kentucky
- Coordinates: 38°02′N 83°55′W
- Country: United States
- State: Kentucky
- Founded: 1796
- Named for: Richard Montgomery
- Seat: Mount Sterling
- Largest city: Mount Sterling

Government
  - Judge/Executive: Chris Haddix (R)

Area
  - Total: 199 sq mi (520 km^{2})
  - Land: 197 sq mi (510 km^{2})
  - Water: 1.5 sq mi (3.9 km^{2}) 0.7%

Population (2020)
  - Total: 28,114
  - Estimate (2025): 28,822 ▲
  - Density: 143/sq mi (55.1/km^{2})
- Time zone: UTC−5 (Eastern)
  - Summer (DST): UTC−4 (EDT)
- Congressional district: 6th
- Website: montgomerycounty.ky.gov

Montgomery County is a county located in the U.S. state of Kentucky. As of the 2020 census, the population was 28,114. Its county seat is Mount Sterling. With regard to the sale of alcohol, it is classified as a moist county—a county in which alcohol sales are prohibited (a dry county), but containing a "wet" city where package alcohol sales are allowed, in this case Mount Sterling. Montgomery County is part of the Mount Sterling, KY Micropolitan Statistical Area, which is also included in the Lexington-Fayette–Richmond–Frankfort, KY combined statistical area.

== History ==
In 1793 Shoe Boots (Tarsekayahke) led Cherokee and Shawnee warriors in a raid on Morgan's Station, in what was known as the last Indian raid in Kentucky. Some settlers were killed and two adolescent girls, including Clarinda Allington, were taken captive and the party returned to Cherokee territory. Believing he had saved Clarinda's life, Shoe Boots later married her, and they had three children together. He was a wealthy, successful leader. Several years later, Clarinda gained a visit back to her family in Kentucky with her children and decided to stay. They could not support her, but the state voted a 3-year pension for her.

Montgomery County was established in 1796 from land given by Clark County. Montgomery was the 22nd Kentucky county in order of formation.

Montgomery County was named in honor of Richard Montgomery, an American Revolutionary War Brigadier General killed in 1775 while attempting to capture Quebec City, Canada. An alternative story holds that the county was named for Thomas Montgomery from Virginia, who served in the Revolutionary War. In 1793 Thomas Montgomery settled in Mt. Sterling. In 1805, Thomas Montgomery moved on to Gibson County, Indiana.

== Geography ==
According to the United States Census Bureau, the county has a total area of 199 square miles (520 km^{2}), of which 197 square miles (510 km^{2}) is land and 1.5 square miles (3.9 km^{2}) (0.7%) is water.

=== Adjacent counties ===
- Bourbon County (northwest)
- Bath County (northeast)
- Menifee County (southeast)
- Powell County (south)
- Clark County (west)

== Demographics ==
Historical population
Census	Pop.	Note	%±
1800	7,082		—
1810	12,975		83.2%
1820	9,587		−26.1%
1830	10,240		6.8%
1840	9,332		−8.9%
1850	9,903		6.1%
1860	7,859		−20.6%
1870	7,557		−3.8%
1880	10,566		39.8%
1890	12,367		17.0%
1900	12,834		3.8%
1910	12,868		0.3%
1920	12,245		−4.8%
1930	11,660		−4.8%
1940	12,280		5.3%
1950	13,025		6.1%
1960	13,461		3.3%
1970	15,364		14.1%
1980	20,046		30.5%
1990	19,561		−2.4%
2000	22,554		15.3%
2010	26,499		17.5%
2020	28,114		6.1%
2025 (est.)	28,822	▲	2.5%
U.S. Decennial Census; 1790-1960 1900-1990; 1990-2000 2010-2020

=== 2020 census ===
As of the 2020 census, the county had a population of 28,114. The median age was 40.1 years. 23.5% of residents were under the age of 18 and 16.9% of residents were 65 years of age or older. For every 100 females there were 94.5 males, and for every 100 females age 18 and over there were 91.6 males age 18 and over.

The racial makeup of the county was 90.9% White, 2.2% Black or African American, 0.2% American Indian and Alaska Native, 0.5% Asian, 0.0% Native Hawaiian and Pacific Islander, 1.7% from some other race, and 4.5% from two or more races. Hispanic or Latino residents of any race comprised 3.3% of the population.

49.5% of residents lived in urban areas, while 50.5% lived in rural areas.

There were 11,117 households in the county, of which 32.2% had children under the age of 18 living with them and 26.8% had a female householder with no spouse or partner present. About 26.3% of all households were made up of individuals and 12.3% had someone living alone who was 65 years of age or older.

There were 12,125 housing units, of which 8.3% were vacant. Among occupied housing units, 65.8% were owner-occupied and 34.2% were renter-occupied. The homeowner vacancy rate was 1.1% and the rental vacancy rate was 6.5%.

=== 2000 census ===
As of the census of 2000, there were 22,554 people, 8,902 households, and 6,436 families residing in the county. The population density was 114 per square mile (44/km^{2}). There were 9,682 housing units at an average density of 49 per square mile (19/km^{2}). The racial makeup of the county was 75.07% White, 23.48% Black or African American, 0.15% Native American, 0.11% Asian, 0.03% Pacific Islander, 0.35% from other races, and 0.82% from two or more races. 1.15% of the population were Hispanic or Latino of any race.

There were 8,902 households, out of which 33.60% had children under the age of 18 living with them, 57.70% were married couples living together, 11.20% had a female householder with no husband present, and 27.70% were non-families. 23.90% of all households were made up of individuals, and 10.50% had someone living alone who was 65 years of age or older. The average household size was 2.49 and the average family size was 2.93.

The age distribution was 24.90% under the age of 18, 8.70% from 18 to 24, 30.20% from 25 to 44, 23.40% from 45 to 64, and 12.90% who were 65 years of age or older. The median age was 36 years. For every 100 females, there were 94.60 males. For every 100 females age 18 and over, there were 91.00 males.

The median income for a household in the county was $31,746, and the median income for a family was $36,939. Males had a median income of $31,428 versus $20,941 for females. The per capita income for the county was $16,701. About 12.50% of families and 15.20% of the population were below the poverty line, including 18.10% of those under age 18 and 17.30% of those age 65 or over.

== Politics ==
United States presidential election results for Montgomery County, Kentucky
Year	Republican		Democratic		Third party(ies)	
Year	No.	%	No.	%	No.	%
1912	758	27.13%	1,615	57.80%	421	15.07%
1916	1,195	40.88%	1,705	58.33%	23	0.79%
1920	2,163	41.12%	3,069	58.35%	28	0.53%
1924	1,956	44.92%	2,347	53.90%	51	1.17%
1928	2,742	58.35%	1,938	41.24%	19	0.40%
1932	1,515	34.92%	2,810	64.78%	13	0.30%
1936	1,649	38.65%	2,594	60.79%	24	0.56%
1940	1,671	37.64%	2,755	62.06%	13	0.29%
1944	1,481	38.74%	2,334	61.05%	8	0.21%
1948	1,083	26.38%	2,731	66.51%	292	7.11%
1952	1,981	42.62%	2,653	57.08%	14	0.30%
1956	2,220	45.35%	2,656	54.26%	19	0.39%
1960	2,451	48.25%	2,629	51.75%	0	0.00%
1964	1,540	33.60%	3,039	66.31%	4	0.09%
1968	2,113	46.87%	1,408	31.23%	987	21.89%
1972	2,868	62.63%	1,657	36.19%	54	1.18%
1976	2,032	38.82%	3,141	60.01%	61	1.17%
1980	2,869	44.70%	3,391	52.84%	158	2.46%
1984	3,864	60.59%	2,490	39.05%	23	0.36%
1988	3,435	52.55%	3,082	47.15%	20	0.31%
1992	2,590	34.03%	3,686	48.43%	1,335	17.54%
1996	2,681	39.45%	3,372	49.62%	743	10.93%
2000	4,534	53.22%	3,833	44.99%	152	1.78%
2004	5,647	55.20%	4,506	44.05%	77	0.75%
2008	5,947	57.56%	4,234	40.98%	150	1.45%
2012	6,398	62.43%	3,701	36.11%	149	1.45%
2016	7,856	68.60%	3,158	27.58%	438	3.82%
2020	8,993	70.03%	3,630	28.27%	219	1.71%
2024	9,302	72.55%	3,329	25.97%	190	1.48%

=== Elected officials ===
Elected officials as of January 3, 2025
U.S. House	Andy Barr (R)	KY 6
Ky. Senate	Greg Elkins (R)	28
Ky. House	David Hale (R)	74

== Communities ==
=== Cities ===
- Camargo
- Jeffersonville
- Mount Sterling (county seat)

=== Unincorporated communities ===
- Judy
- Levee
- Hope

== Education ==
It is in the Montgomery County School District. The District includes Montgomery County High School.

== See also ==
- National Register of Historic Places listings in Montgomery County, Kentucky
