= Frenchburg, Kentucky =

- City
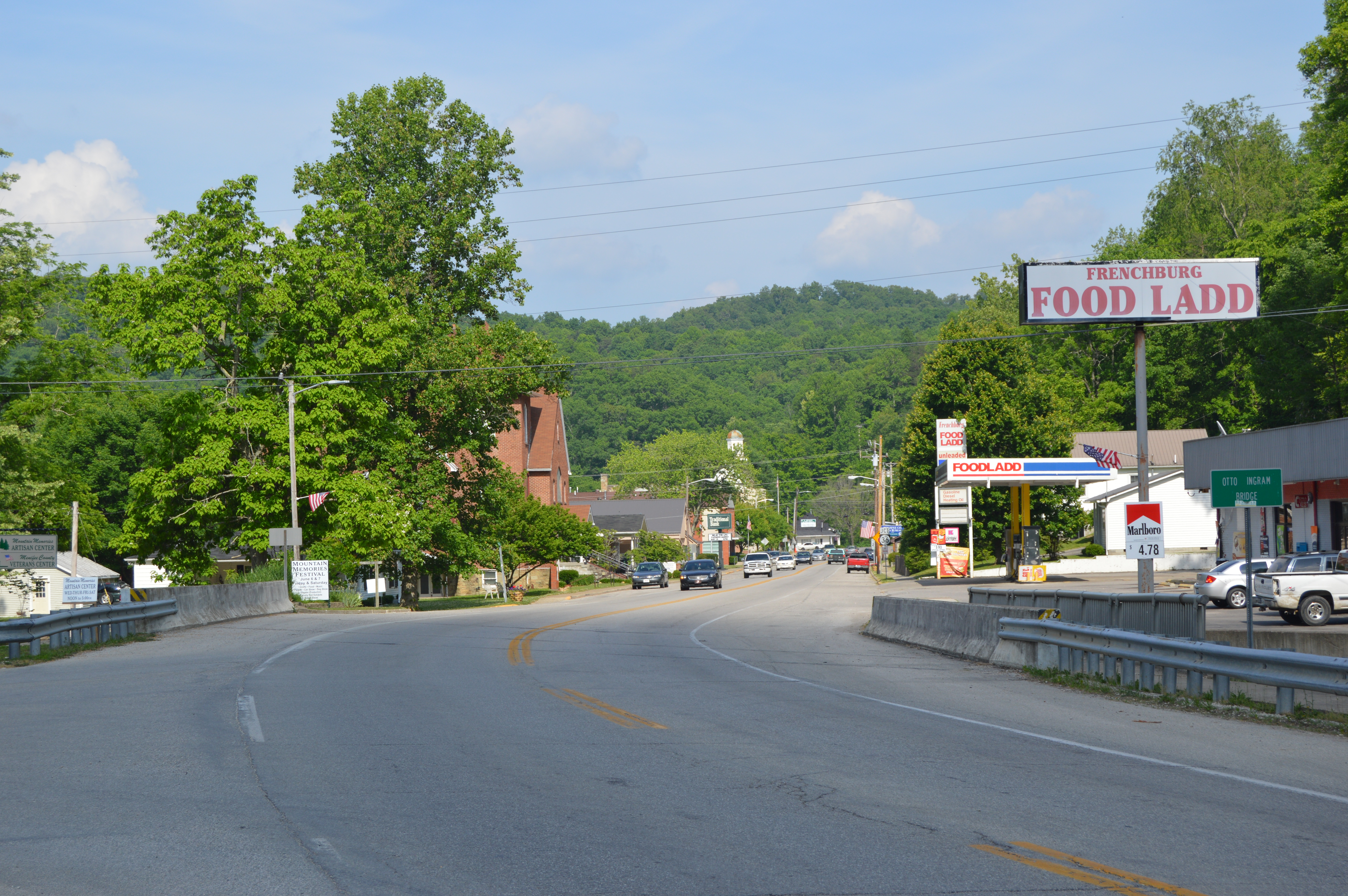
- Walnut Street

- Location in Menifee County, Kentucky
- Coordinates: 37°57′11″N 83°37′38″W
- Country: United States
- State: Kentucky
- County: Menifee

Area
  - Total: 0.84 sq mi (2.18 km^{2})
  - Land: 0.84 sq mi (2.17 km^{2})
  - Water: 0 sq mi (0.00 km^{2})
- Elevation: 873 ft (266 m)

Population (2020)
  - Total: 601
  - Density: 715.7/sq mi (276.33/km^{2})
- Time zone: UTC-5 (Eastern (EST))
  - Summer (DST): UTC-4 (EDT)
- ZIP code: 40322
- Area code: 606
- FIPS code: 21-29260
- GNIS feature ID: 0512254

Frenchburg is a home rule-class city in Menifee County, Kentucky, in the United States. The population was 601 at the 2020 census, up from 486 in 2010. It is the seat and only incorporated city in its rural county. It is located at the junction of U.S. Route 460 and Kentucky Route 36. Logging is the primary industry.

Frenchburg is part of the Mount Sterling Micropolitan Statistical Area.

== History ==
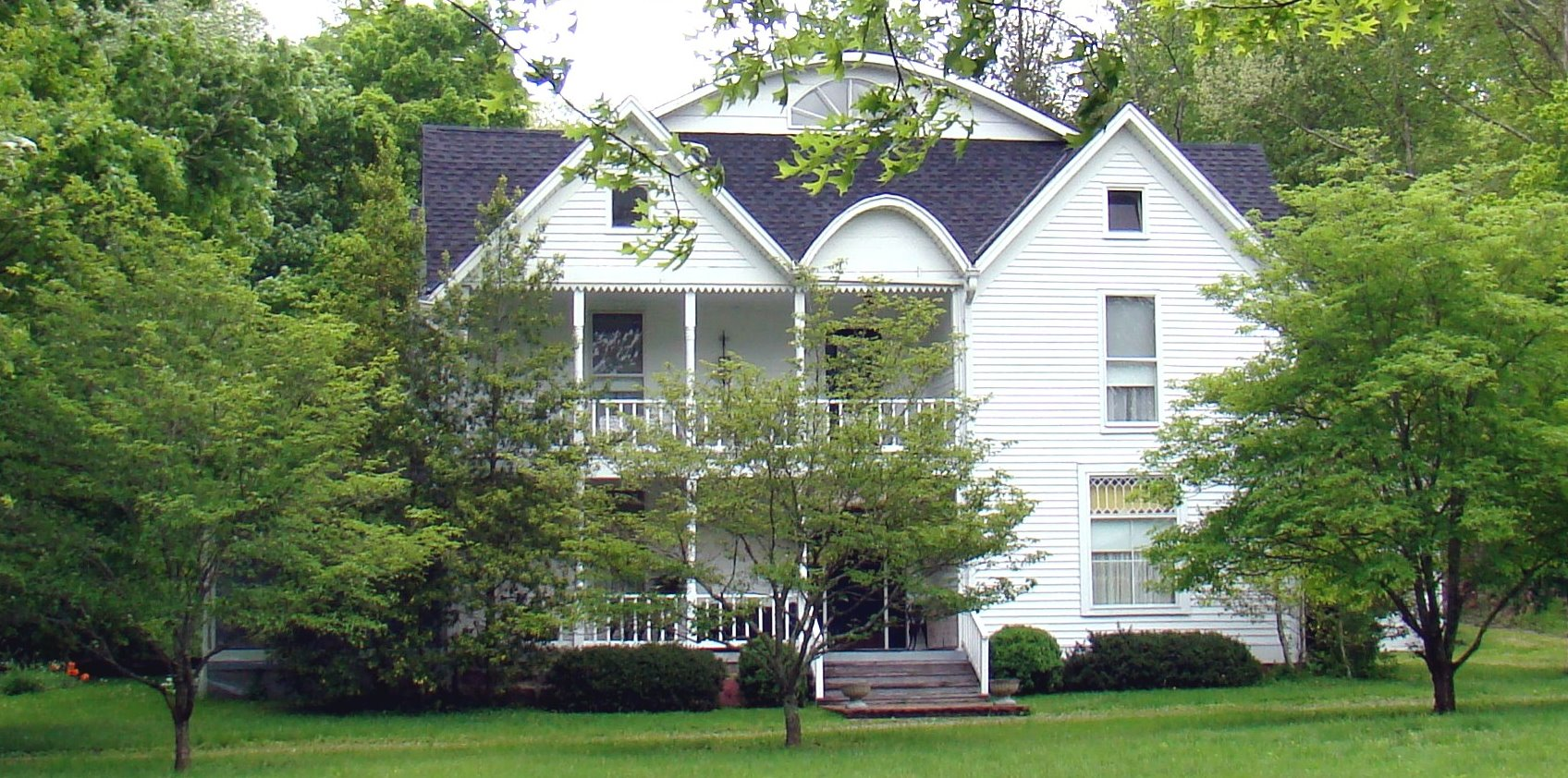
The historic Caudel House

Frenchburg was laid out in 1869 to be the county seat of newly formed Menifee County and was named for Robert French, a local lawyer and judge. It was formally incorporated by the state assembly in 1871.

Frenchburg was nearly destroyed on June 27, 1882, when Beaver Creek flooded, sweeping away all but three buildings and killing six people.

In 1910, the United Presbyterian Center was established in Frenchburg as the only secondary education for Menifee County by Dr. Edward Owings Guerrant, a physician and preacher. A hospital was built in 1915 and served as the only one between Lexington and Ashland for many years. In 1978, the campus was admitted to the National Register for Historic Places as Frenchburg School Campus for its educational, social, and religious significance.

== Geography ==
Frenchburg is located at 37°57′11″N 83°37′38″W (37.953176, -83.627210), northwest of the center of Menifee County. It sits in the valley of Beaver Creek, where it is joined from the south by Blythes Branch.

Via U.S. 460, Mount Sterling is 21 miles (34 km) to the northwest, and West Liberty is 27 miles (43 km) to the east. KY 36 leads north from Frenchburg 18 miles (29 km) to Owingsville.

According to the United States Census Bureau, the city has a total area of 0.84 square miles (2.2 km^{2}), of which 0.001 square miles (0.003 km^{2}), or 0.12%, are water. Beaver Creek flows northeast to join the Licking River in Cave Run Lake.

=== Climate ===
The climate in this area is characterized by relatively high temperatures and evenly distributed precipitation throughout the year. The Köppen Climate Classification subtype for this climate is "Cfa" (Humid Subtropical Climate).

== Demographics ==
Historical population
Census	Pop.	Note	%±
1880	143		—
1890	222		55.2%
1900	210		−5.4%
1910	172		−18.1%
1920	270		57.0%
1930	246		−8.9%
1940	289		17.5%
1950	268		−7.3%
1960	296		10.4%
1970	467		57.8%
1980	550		17.8%
1990	625		13.6%
2000	551		−11.8%
2010	486		−11.8%
2020	601		23.7%
U.S. Decennial Census

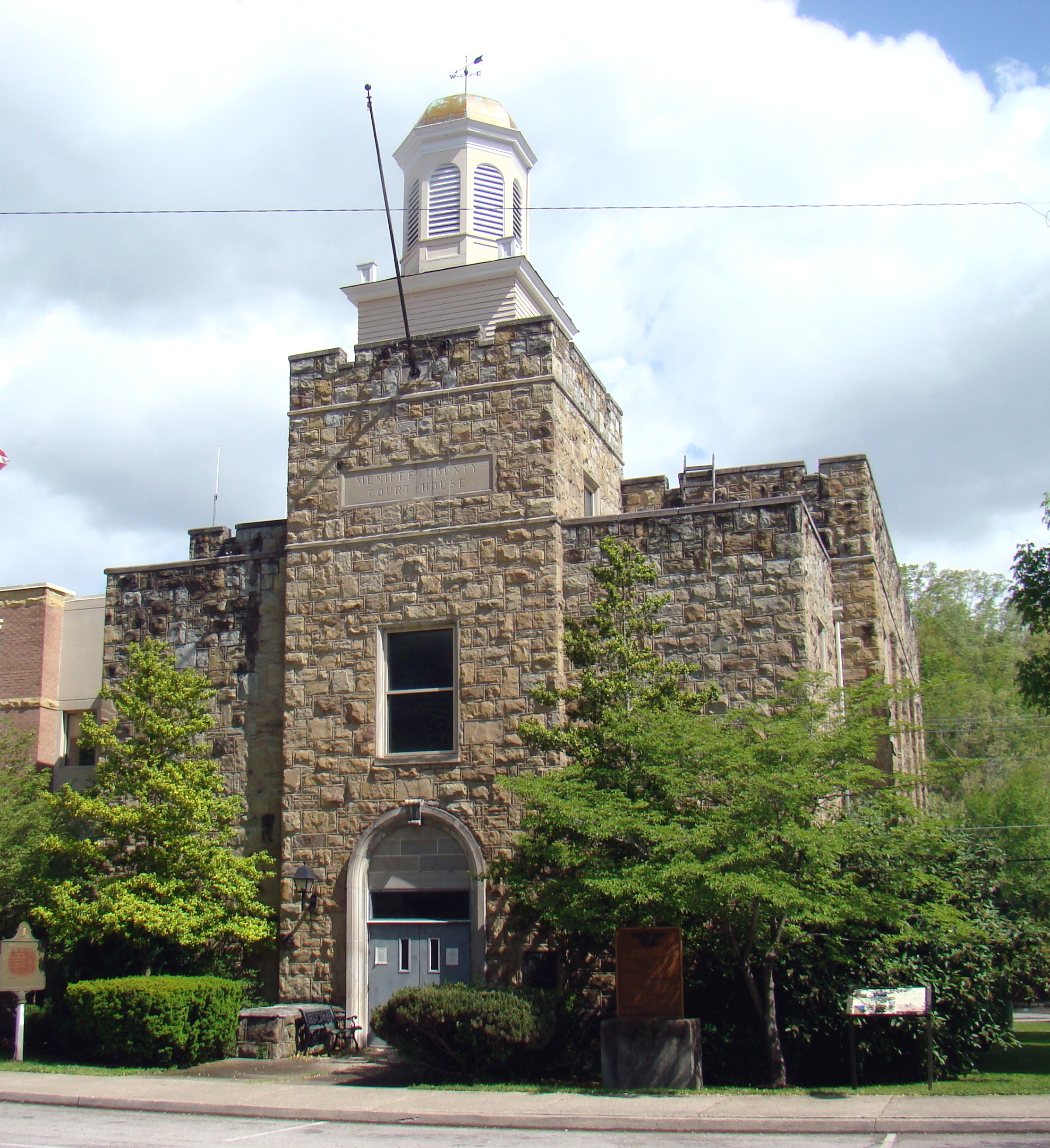
Menifee County Courthouse

As of the census of 2000, there were 551 people, 245 households, and 174 families residing in the city. The population density was 528.4 inhabitants per square mile (204.0/km^{2}). There were 279 housing units at an average density of 267.5 per square mile (103.3/km^{2}). The racial makeup of the city was 99.64% White, and 0.36% from two or more races. Hispanic or Latino of any race were 1.09% of the population.

There were 245 households, out of which 32.2% had children under the age of 18 living with them, 48.6% were married couples living together, 19.6% had a female householder with no husband present, and 28.6% were non-families. 26.9% of all households were made up of individuals, and 13.5% had someone living alone who was 65 years of age or older. The average household size was 2.25 and the average family size was 2.66.

In the city, the population was spread out, with 24.5% under the age of 18, 13.2% from 18 to 24, 22.9% from 25 to 44, 24.9% from 45 to 64, and 14.5% who were 65 years of age or older. The median age was 36 years. For every 100 females, there were 78.9 males. For every 100 females age 18 and over, there were 71.2 males.

The median income for a household in the city was $22,350, and the median income for a family was $28,333. Males had a median income of $25,221 versus $19,286 for females. The per capita income for the city was $12,288. About 22.0% of families and 27.5% of the population were below the poverty line, including 35.5% of those under age 18 and 24.2% of those age 65 or over.

== Law and government ==
Frenchburg is a sixth-class city governed by a mayor-commission form of government. The current mayor is Stacy Smallwood. The city commission is made up of four members: Nancy Sorrell, Della Brown, Jennifer Wells and Janice Little. Frenchburg is located in Kentucky's 6th Congressional District.

== Education ==
The city is home to Menifee County High School, and Menifee Central.

Frenchburg has a lending library, a branch of the Menifee County Public Library.

== Media ==
The area was served by the Foothills Courier newspaper from June 1996 until January 2007. The newspaper was a private, non-affiliated publication, supported by local individuals and businesses. The business failed to financially sustain itself after the death of its editor on October 18, 2006. The Foothills Courier was bought out shortly thereafter by the Menifee County News, an affiliated publication from Carlisle, Kentucky.
