= National Register of Historic Places listings in Estill County, Kentucky =

Location of Estill County in Kentucky

This is a list of the National Register of Historic Places listings in Estill County, Kentucky.

It is intended to be a complete list of the properties on the National Register of Historic Places in Estill County, Kentucky, United States. The locations of National Register properties for which the latitude and longitude coordinates are included below, may be seen in a map.

There are 8 properties listed on the National Register in the county.

This National Park Service list is complete through NPS recent listings posted March 21, 2025.

== Current listings ==
	Name on the Register	Image	Date listed	Location	City or town	Description
1	Ashley Petroglyphs (15ES27)		September 8, 1989 (#89001186)	Address Restricted	Furnace	
2	Cottage Iron Furnace	Cottage Iron Furnace	September 20, 1973 (#73000794)	7 miles northeast of Irvine in Daniel Boone National Forest; 37°45′27″N 83°54′51″W	Irvine	
3	Irvine Grade School	Irvine Grade School	August 18, 2000 (#00000865)	228 Broadway; 37°41′54″N 83°58′06″W	Irvine	
4	Irvine Historic Business District	Irvine Historic Business District	August 2, 2000 (#00000866)	Roughly the junction of Kentucky Routes 52 and 89; 37°41′59″N 83°58′30″W	Irvine	
5	Ravenna Motor Vehicle Service Building	Ravenna Motor Vehicle Service Building	June 21, 2000 (#00000278)	512 Main St. 37°41′04″N 83°57′09″W	Ravenna	
6	Red River Iron Furnace	Red River Iron Furnace	May 17, 1974 (#74000860)	Kentucky Route 975, in Daniel Boone National Forest; 37°43′58″N 83°51′10″W	Fitchburg	
7	Riverview Hotel	Riverview Hotel	April 3, 1992 (#92000171)	Main St. 37°41′58″N 83°58′31″W	Irvine	
8	Sparks Indian Rock House Petroglyphs (15ES26)		September 8, 1989 (#89001187)	Address Restricted	Lexington	

== See also ==
- List of National Historic Landmarks in Kentucky
- National Register of Historic Places listings in Kentucky
