= Mintonville, Kentucky =

Mintonville
- Unincorporated community
- Location within the state of Kentucky Mintonville (the United States)
- Coordinates: 37°10′38″N 84°48′39″W
- Country: United States
- State: Kentucky
- County: Casey
- Elevation: 1,204 ft (367 m)
- Time zone: UTC-5 (Eastern (EST))
  - Summer (DST): UTC-4 (EST)
- GNIS feature ID: 508616

Mintonville in Kentucky, USA, is an unincorporated community sitting at the foot of the Green River Knob in the extreme southeastern Casey County. The town was plotted in 1849 and partially built in 1851. The first postmaster, James Wesley, named it after Robert Minton when the post office first opened on October 3, 1851.
