= National Register of Historic Places listings in Casey County, Kentucky =

Location of Casey County in Kentucky

This is a list of the National Register of Historic Places listings in Casey County, Kentucky.

It is intended to be a complete list of the properties on the National Register of Historic Places in Casey County, Kentucky, United States. The locations of National Register properties for which the latitude and longitude coordinates are included below, may be seen in a map.

There are 2 properties listed on the National Register in the county.

This National Park Service list is complete through NPS recent listings posted December 12, 2025.

== Current listings ==
	Name on the Register	Image	Date listed	Location	City or town	Description
1	Casey County Courthouse	Casey County Courthouse	August 29, 1977 (#77000607)	Courthouse Sq. 37°19′03″N 84°56′25″W	Liberty	
2	Liberty Downtown Historic District	Liberty Downtown Historic District	February 7, 2008 (#08000004)	1st block of Campbellsville Rd., Hustonville and Middleburg Sts., and Courthouse Sq. 37°19′04″N 84°56′23″W	Liberty	

== See also ==
- List of National Historic Landmarks in Kentucky
- National Register of Historic Places listings in Kentucky
