= Labascus, Kentucky =

Labascus
- Unincorporated community
- Location within the state of Kentucky Labascus (the United States)
- Coordinates: 37°13′35″N 84°55′9″W
- Country: United States
- State: Kentucky
- County: Casey
- Elevation: 846 ft (258 m)
- Time zone: UTC-6 (Central (CST))
  - Summer (DST): UTC-5 (CST)
- GNIS feature ID: 508414

Labascus is an unincorporated community in Casey County, Kentucky, United States. Its post office has ceased to exist.
