= Honey Acre, Kentucky =

Honey Acre
- Unincorporated community
- Location within the state of Kentucky Honey Acre (the United States)
- Coordinates: 37°6′46″N 84°58′29″W
- Country: United States
- State: Kentucky
- County: Casey
- Elevation: 1,014 ft (309 m)
- Time zone: UTC-6 (Central (CST))
  - Summer (DST): UTC-5 (CST)
- GNIS feature ID: 508272

Honey Acre is an unincorporated community in Casey County, Kentucky, United States.
