= Cantown, Casey County, Kentucky =

Cantown
- Unincorporated community
- Location within the state of Kentucky Cantown (the United States)
- Coordinates: 37°15′41″N 84°54′44″W
- Country: United States
- State: Kentucky
- County: Casey
- Elevation: 1,129 ft (344 m)
- Time zone: UTC-5 (Central (EST))
  - Summer (DST): UTC-5 (EST)
- GNIS feature ID: 507648

Cantown is an unincorporated community in Casey County, Kentucky, United States. It was also known as Contown.
