= Happy Top, Kentucky =

Unincorporated community in Kentucky, United States

- Unincorporated community
- Location within the state of Kentucky Happy Top (the United States)
- Coordinates: 37°34′47″N 84°1′35″W
- Country: United States
- State: Kentucky
- County: Estill
- Elevation: 1,388 ft (423 m)
- Time zone: UTC-5 (Eastern (EST))
  - Summer (DST): UTC-4 (EDT)
- GNIS feature ID: 2440544

Happy Top is an unincorporated community located in Estill County, Kentucky, United States.
