= Dunnville, Kentucky =

Dunnville
- Unincorporated community
- Location within the state of Kentucky Dunnville (the United States)
- Coordinates: 37°12′0″N 85°0′36″W
- Country: United States
- State: Kentucky
- County: Casey
- Elevation: 745 ft (227 m)
- Time zone: UTC-5 (Eastern (EST))
  - Summer (DST): UTC-4 (EDT)
- ZIP codes: 42528
- GNIS feature ID: 491339

Dunnville is an unincorporated community with a post office in southern Casey County, Kentucky, United States, near the intersection of the Green River and Goose Creek. It was named for Virginian James Richard Dunn, who settled the area in the 1840s and operated a mill.

Today, several sawmills and several gate shops, are located there, as Casey County is known for the manufacture of tubular gates and related farm equipment. The post office was first opened on July 3, 1879.
