= Rice Station, Kentucky =

Ghost town in Estill County, Kentucky

Coordinates: 37.7025818°N 84.0482595°W

Rice Station is a ghost town in Estill County, in the U.S. state of Kentucky.

== History ==
A post office called Rice Station was established in 1891, and remained in operation until 1974. The railroad town was named for Charlie Rice, the original owner of the town site.
