= Jacktown =

Jacktown may refer to:

- Jacktown (film), a 1962 American film
- Jacktown, Kentucky, a community in Casey County, Kentucky
- Jacktown, Michigan, a small town in Empire Township, Leelanau County, Michigan
- Jacktown, Ohio, former name of an unincorporated community in Coshocton County now known as Fresno, Ohio

== See also ==
- Jack-Town, a colloquial name for Jackson, Mississippi
- Jakestown, a British radio show on BBC Radio Merseyside
