= Teddy, Kentucky =

Teddy
- Unincorporated community
- Location within the state of Kentucky Teddy (the United States)
- Coordinates: 37°10′47″N 85°56′31″W
- Country: United States
- State: Kentucky
- County: Casey
- Elevation: 814 ft (248 m)
- Time zone: UTC-6 (Central (CST))
  - Summer (DST): UTC-5 (CST)
- GNIS feature ID: 509193

Teddy is an unincorporated community in western Casey County, Kentucky, United States. Their Post Office is no longer in service. It was named by its first post master, Billy Roe Combest, for his son Theodore. The post office closed in 1932.
