= Walltown, Kentucky =

Walltown
- Unincorporated community
- Location within the state of Kentucky Walltown (the United States)
- Coordinates: 37°19′20″N 84°43′54″W
- Country: United States
- State: Kentucky
- County: Casey
- Elevation: 1,234 ft (376 m)
- Time zone: UTC-6 (Central (CST))
  - Summer (DST): UTC-5 (EST)
- GNIS feature ID: 509307

Walltown is a rural unincorporated community in eastern Casey County, Kentucky, United States. It was named for Robert Wall, who purchased 700 acres (2.8 km^{2}) of land in the area in 1807. Its post office operated from 1886 to 1907.
