= Liberty Downtown Historic District (Liberty, Kentucky) =

Historic district in Kentucky, United States

- U.S. National Register of Historic Places
- U.S. Historic district
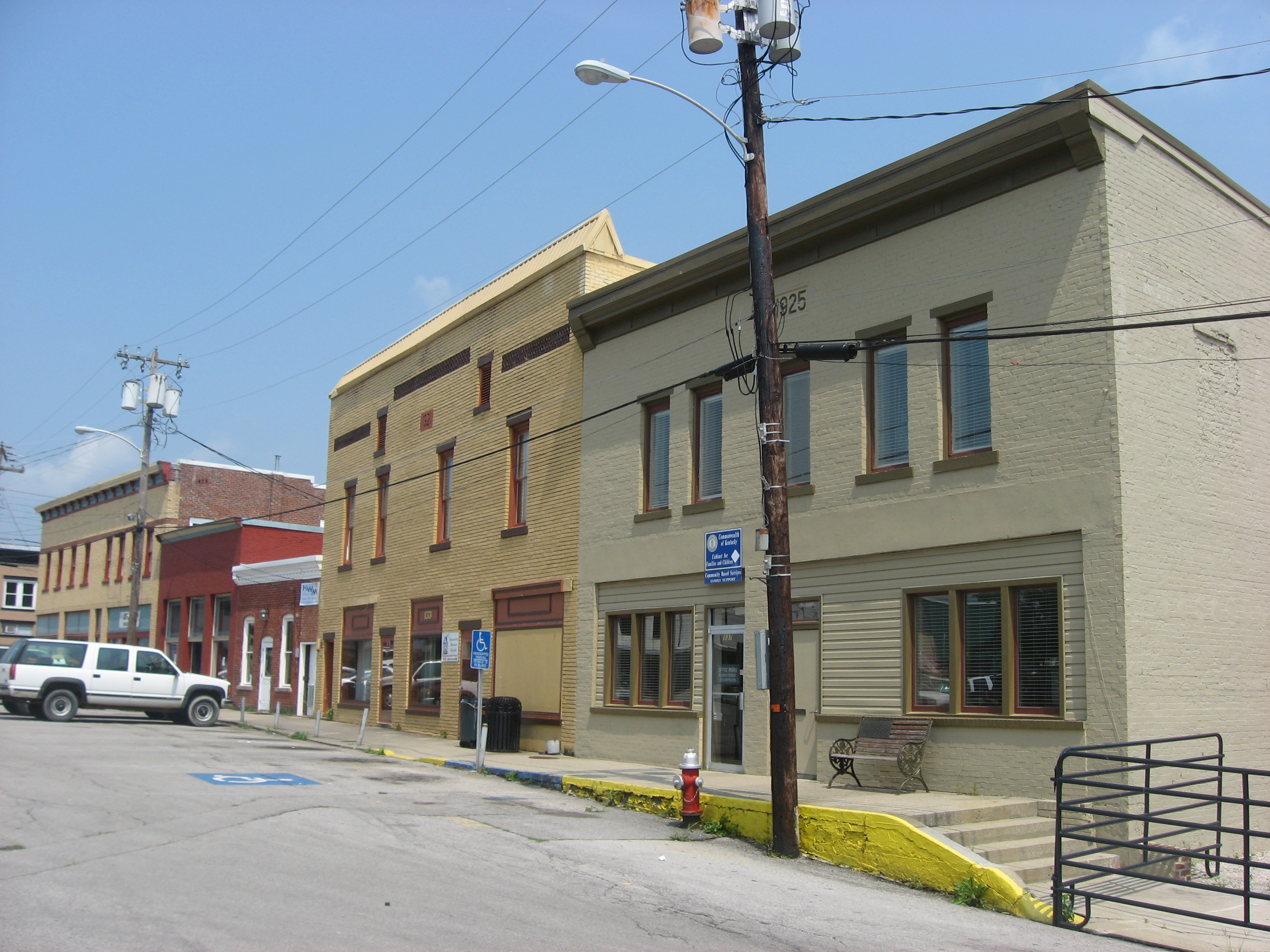
- Hustonville Street on Courthouse Square

- Location within Kentucky Location within the United States
- Location: 1st block of Campbellsville Rd., Hustonville & Middleburg Sts., & Courthouse Sq., Liberty, Kentucky
- Coordinates: 37°19′04″N 84°56′23″W
- Area: 7.5 acres (3.0 ha)
- Built: 1924
- Architect: Viquesney, E.M., sculptor
- Architectural style: Romanesque, Early Commercial
- NRHP reference No.: 08000004
- Added to NRHP: February 7, 2008

The Liberty Downtown Historic District is a historic district in Liberty in Casey County, Kentucky which was listed on the National Register of Historic Places in 2008.

The 7.5 acres (3.0 ha) listed area included 28 contributing buildings and one contributing site.

It includes the old Casey County Courthouse, which was separately listed on the National Register in 1977. It includes Early Commercial and Romanesque Revival architecture.

Liberty, the county seat, was chartered in 1808 and officially incorporated in 1830.

A 2011 survey of historic resources in Casey County noted that 47 properties were surveyed in Liberty, leading to the NRHP nomination, and that historic resources in the surrounding county were, up to that point, not well documented. The survey identified 15 historic schoolhouses and other rural sites near Liberty (i.e., within a quadrangle map area surrounding Liberty).
