= Casey County Schools =

Public school district in Kentucky, United States

Casey County Schools is a school district headquartered in Liberty, Kentucky. It serves Casey County.

== Schools ==
Secondary schools

- Casey County High School
- Casey County Middle School

Primary schools:

- Jones Park Elementary School
- Walnut Hill Elementary School
- Liberty Elementary School

Other:

- Casey County ATC
