= WKDO-FM =

Radio station in Liberty, Kentucky

WKDO and WKDO-FM
Liberty, Kentucky; United States
- Frequencies: WKDO: 1560 kHz; WKDO-FM: 98.7 MHz
- Branding: WKDO: The Vault; WKDO-FM: 98.7 The Buck

Programming
- Format: WKDO: Classic hits; WKDO-FM: Classic country

Ownership
- Owner: Michael and Laura Harris; (Shoreline Communications, Inc.)

History
- First air date: WKDO: 1963; WKDO-FM: 1977
- Former call signs: WKDO: WPHN (1963–1968)

Technical information
- Licensing authority: FCC
- Facility ID: WKDO: 8993; WKDO-FM: 8890
- Class: WKDO: D; WKDO-FM: C3
- Power: WKDO: 1,000 watts (day)
- ERP: WKDO-FM: 25,000 watts
- HAAT: WKDO-FM: 73 meters (240 ft)
- Transmitter coordinates: WKDO: 37°18′22″N 84°55′2″W
- Translator(s): WKDO: 103.7 W279DT (Liberty)

Links
- Public license information: WKDO: Public file; LMS; WKDO-FM: Public file; LMS
- Webcast: Listen live
- Website: chasinthebuck.com

WKDO-FM (98.7 FM) and WKDO (1560 AM) are a pair of radio stations broadcasting a classic country format on FM and a classic hits format on AM, both licensed to Liberty, Kentucky, United States.

Both stations were sold to Creal Broadcasting, Inc. on March 1, 2013, at a price of $300,000. Effective August 18, 2017, Creal Broadcasting sold both stations to Michael and Laura Harris's Shoreline Communications, Inc. for $395,000.

WKDO features on-air personalities including Operations Manager Jerry Atwood Monday - Friday 6:00 AM – 10:00 AM Eastern Time; Weather Specialist Crystal Sallee Monday - Friday 1:00 PM – 6:00 PM Eastern Time; Sales Representative Jeff Henderson Monday - Friday 6:00 PM – 10:00 PM ET.
