= WIHE-LP =

- Liberty, Kentucky; United States
- Broadcast area: Metro Liberty
- Frequency: 101.3 MHz
- Branding: 101.3 FM

Programming
- Format: Variety

Ownership
- Owner: Wesley Communications, LLC; (Liberty Public Radio, Inc.)

History
- First air date: January 5, 2015

Technical information
- Licensing authority: FCC
- Facility ID: 192439
- Class: L1
- Power: 100 watts
- HAAT: 27.8 meters (91 ft)
- Transmitter coordinates: 37°18′56.20″N 84°55′28.20″W

Links
- Public license information: LMS
- Webcast: WIHE-LP Webstream
- Website: WIHE-LP Online

WIHE-LP is a Variety formatted broadcast radio station licensed to and serving Liberty, Kentucky. WIHE-LP is owned and operated by Wesley Communications, LLC.
