= Bowling Green Organizational Maintenance Shop No. 10 =

- Bowling Green OMS #10
- U.S. National Register of Historic Places
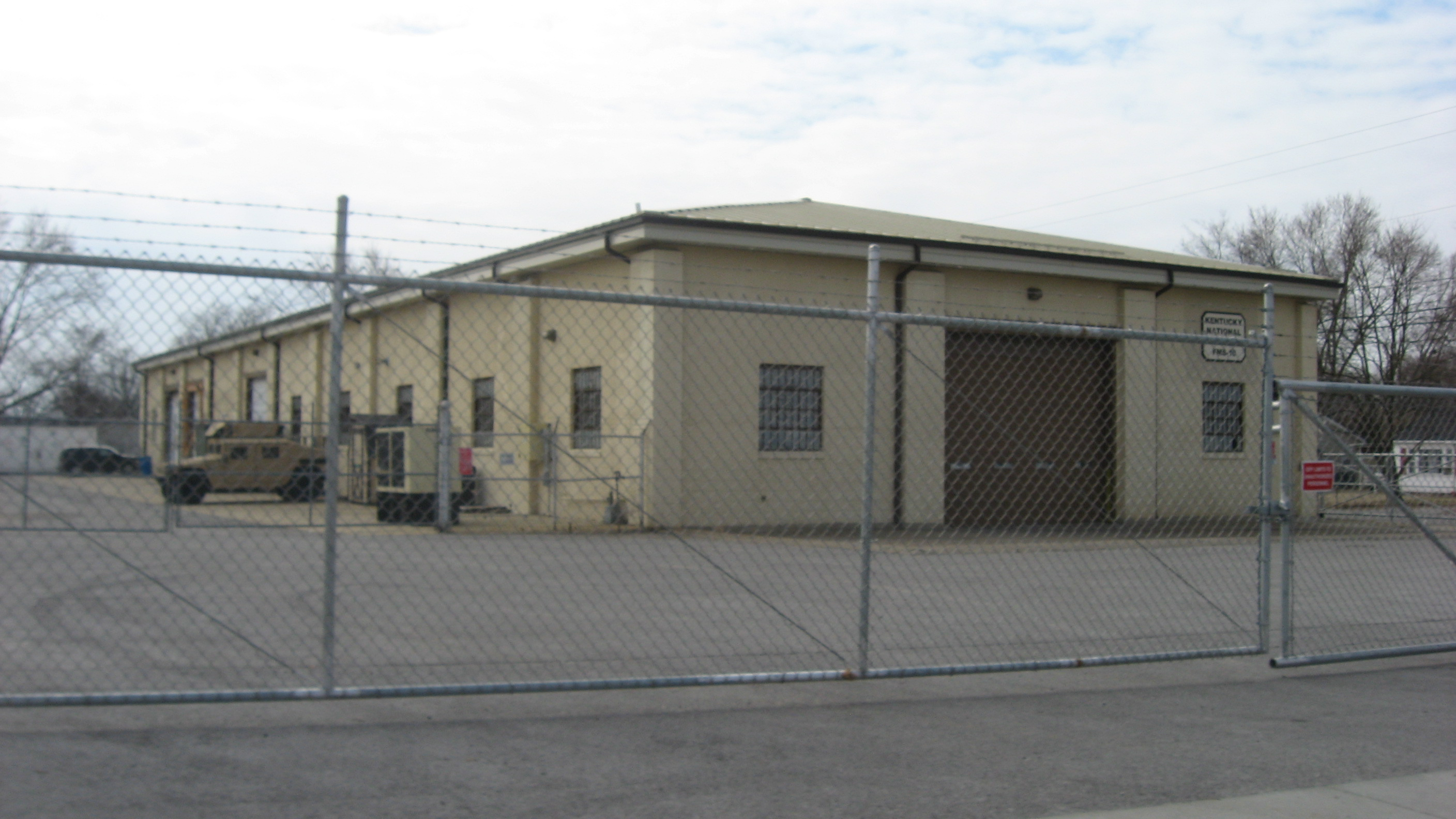

- Location within Kentucky Location within the United States
- Location: 719 Old Morgantown Rd., Bowling Green, Kentucky
- Coordinates: 36°59′20″N 86°28′09″W
- Area: 1 acre (0.40 ha)
- Built: 1947
- Architectural style: Modern Movement
- MPS: Kentucky's National Guard Facilities MPS
- NRHP reference No.: 02000925
- Added to NRHP: September 6, 2002

The Bowling Green OMS #10, at 719 Old Morgantown Rd. in Bowling Green, Kentucky, was built in 1947. It was listed on the National Register of Historic Places in 2002.

It is a Modern Movement style "Organizational Maintenance Shed" built to provide for maintenance and storage of Kentucky National Guard vehicles.

It is built of concrete blocks and was painted white.

== See also ==
- Ravenna Motor Vehicle Service Building
