= Drowning Creek (Kentucky) =

Coordinates: 37°44′55″N 84°04′52″W

Drowning Creek is a stream located in Estill County, Kentucky, United States. It is a tributary of the Kentucky River.
