= Casey County Courthouse =

- U.S. National Register of Historic Places
- U.S. Historic district – Contributing property
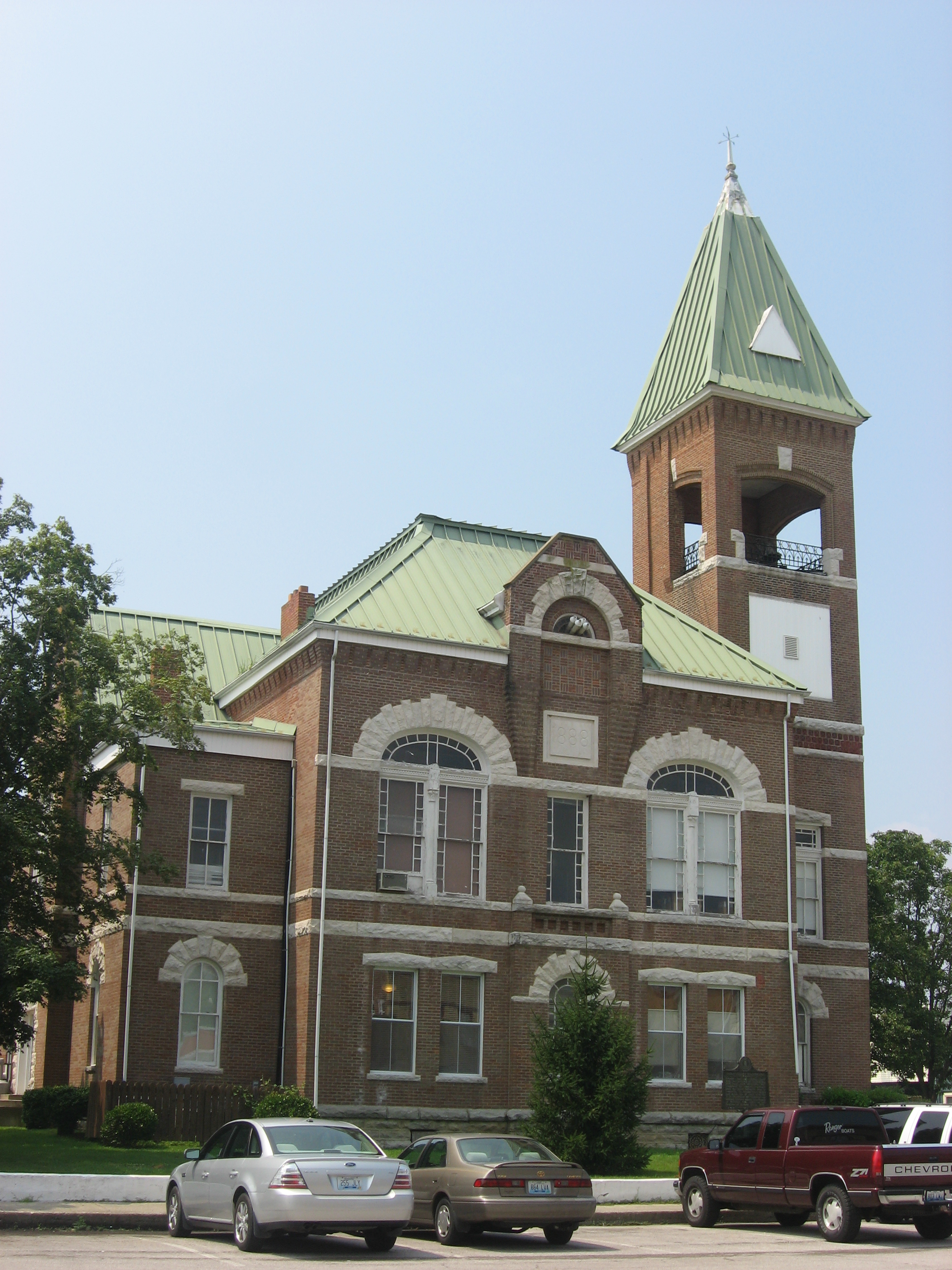

- Location within Kentucky Location within the United States
- Location: Courthouse Sq., Liberty, Kentucky
- Coordinates: 37°19′3″N 84°56′25″W
- Area: 1 acre (0.40 ha)
- Built: 1888
- Architect: McDonald Bros.
- Architectural style: Romanesque, Richardsonian Romanesque
- Part of: Liberty Downtown Historic District (ID08000004)
- NRHP reference No.: 77000607

Significant dates
- Added to NRHP: August 29, 1977
- Designated CP: February 7, 2008

The Casey County Courthouse, on Courthouse Square in Liberty, Kentucky was built in 1888. It was listed on the National Register of Historic Places in 1977.

It was designed by the McDonald Brothers architects of Louisville, Kentucky.
