= Jacktown, Kentucky =

Jacktown
- Unincorporated community
- Location within the state of Kentucky Jacktown (the United States)
- Coordinates: 37°26′38″N 85°0′56″W
- Country: United States
- State: Kentucky
- County: Casey
- Elevation: 820 ft (250 m)
- Time zone: UTC-6 (Central (CST))
  - Summer (DST): UTC-5 (CST)
- GNIS feature ID: 508329

Jacktown is an unincorporated community in Casey County, Kentucky, United States.
