= William Casey (Kentucky politician) =

American politician

Personal details
- Born: 1754 Frederick County, Virginia, British America
- Died: 1816 (aged 61–62) Adair County, Kentucky, U.S.
- Resting place: Casey's Station Cemetery

William Casey (1754–1816) was an American settler, military officer, and politician who is the namesake of Casey County, Kentucky. Through his daughter Margaret Lampton, he is the great-grandfather of writer and humorist Mark Twain.

== Early life and family ==
William Casey was born in Frederick County, Virginia in 1754. In the winter of 1779, Casey arrived in Kentucky and camped in the Dix River area. He was an early settler of the Logan's Station area, where he lived with his family until 1791.

In 1782, Casey married Jane Montgomery. They had five children, including:

- Margaret Peggy Casey (1783–1818); married Benjamin Lampton.
- Martha Polly Casey (b. 1787)
- Green Casey (1793–1838)
- Jenny Paxton
- Annie Casey Montgomery

In 1791, Casey and other settlers followed the Green River, and established a settlement near what was later known as Casey's Creek. Casey helped to establish schools in Green and Adair Counties as an early pioneer in the state.

Casey was a prominent landowner in the area, owning over 600 acres and a farm with horses, cattle, and sheep. Casey owned at least six enslaved persons during his adulthood.

== Public service ==
In 1792, Casey was commissioned as Lieutenant Colonel of the 16th Regiment of the Green County Militia, serving during the American Revolutionary War in a company of soldier settlers.

Casey held several political posts in the Commonwealth of Kentucky after it achieved statehood. In 1795, he was an early member of the Kentucky House of Representatives. In 1799, Casey was elected as a member of Kentucky's second Constitutional Convention to adopt the new Constitution of Kentucky.

In 1800, Casey was a member of the Kentucky Senate. In 1802, Casey was elected as a trustee of the town of Columbia. When Casey County was organized in November 1806, it was named in his honor.

Later in his life, Casey donated a tract of his land to become the first Presbyterian church in Adair County. Casey's last political position held was in 1813, as a Presidential elector for Kentucky.

== Death ==
Casey died in the winter of 1816. He is buried in the Casey's Station Cemetery in Adair County.

== Legacy ==
Casey is the namesake of Casey County, Kentucky and Casey Creek. He is named as an ancestor of the Daughters of the American Revolution and a patriot of the Sons of the American Revolution.
