= Fitchburg Furnace =

- U.S. National Register of Historic Places
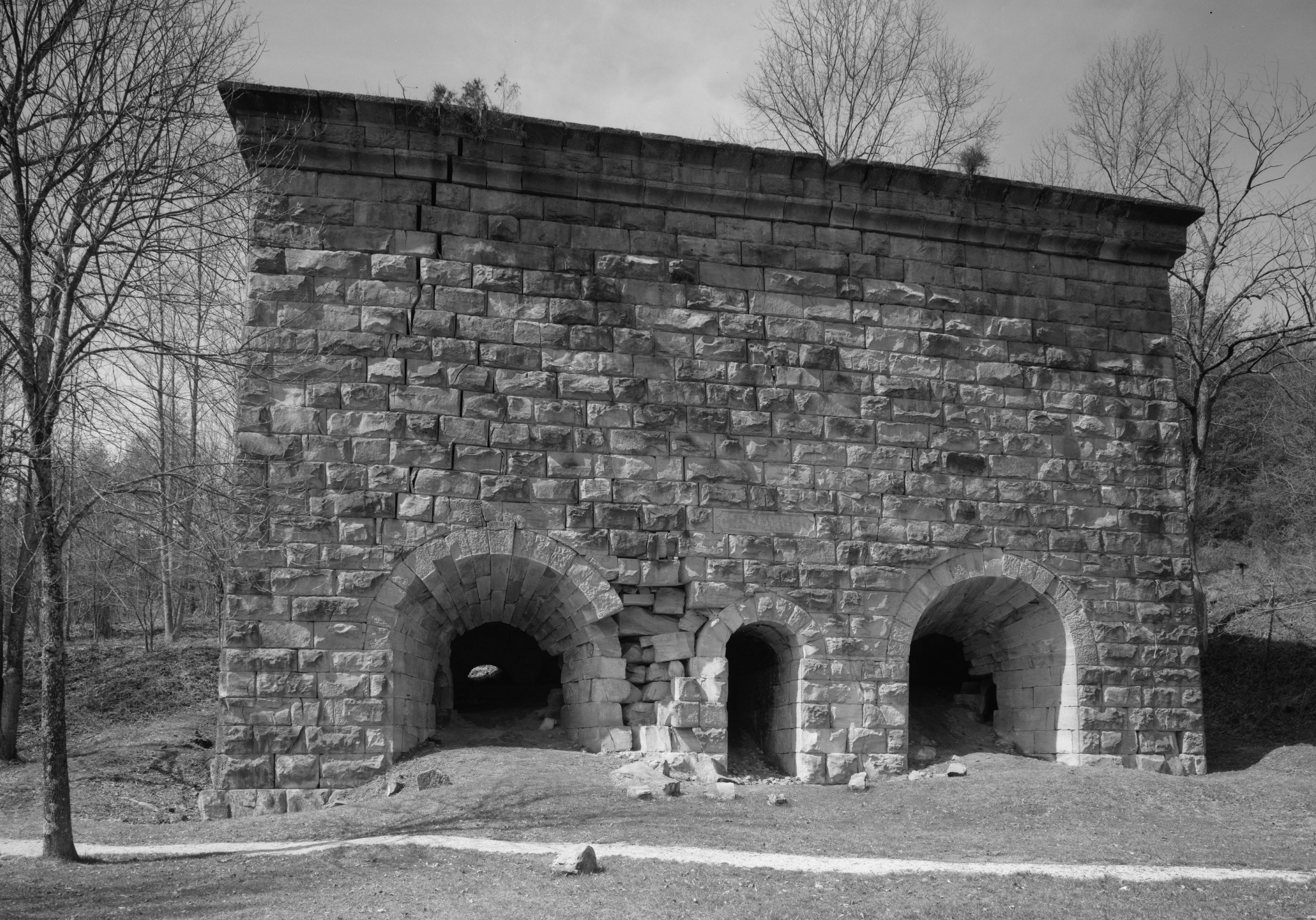
- Fitchburg Furnace before Completion of Restoration Work

- Location within Kentucky Location within the United States
- Location: 1875 Fitchburg Rd, Ravenna, Kentucky, United States
- Coordinates: 37.7327°N 83.8524°W
- Built: 1868
- NRHP reference No.: 74000860

The Fitchburg Furnace is a historic iron furnace located in the Daniel Boone National Forest in Estill County, KY.

The furnace is the world's largest charcoal iron furnace and the last to be built in Kentucky. The structure was state of the art in its time. With core of the furnace consisted of twin stacks built of local sandstone using traditional dry laid stone masonry, and today is counted among the top dry masonry projects in the world. The massive structure stands 115 feet long, 40 feet wide, and 65 feet high. A number of innovative features first used at this furnace were later taken up by modern furnaces.

Designed by Fred Fitch and built by Sam Worthley, a stonemason from Scotland, the furnace was completed in 1869, and operated by Red River Iron Works. It is unique in that it consists of two furnaces in a single structure. It operated from 1870 to 1874 and employed over 1000 men. In 1870, this furnace produced 10,000 tons of pig iron valued at more than $60,000.

The production of pig iron was one of Kentucky's earliest industries. A major producer of iron since 1791, Kentucky ranked third in the U.S. in the 1830s and 11th in 1865. Estill County in particular was one of the first areas in the United States to experience early industrialization, with iron mining and smelting beginning in 1810. The iron industry thrived in Estill County for decades, with the ruins of several furnaces, in addition to Fitchburg Furnace, being visible today, including the Estill furnace and the Cottage furnace.

After 1879, the industry declined due to the obsolescence of the process, the start of iron production around the Great Lakes, and the depletion of ore and timber.

The town of Fitchburg sprang up when the furnace was built; with a thriving community existing for the years of the furnace's operation. Today nothing remains to indicate the town of Fitchburg ever existed.

Originally the furnace consisted of several connecting structures, however, today only the stone core remains. This structure suffered years of neglect, with numerous stones falling out, one front corner being blasted out with dynamite, and trees are growing on the top. However, since 2004 much of these damages have been repaired, and the furnace has been maintained by the US Forest Service and private donors.

Today Fitchburg Furnace is accessible as a historic site in the Daniel Boone National Forest outside of Ravenna, KY.
