= Irvine Grade School =

- U.S. National Register of Historic Places
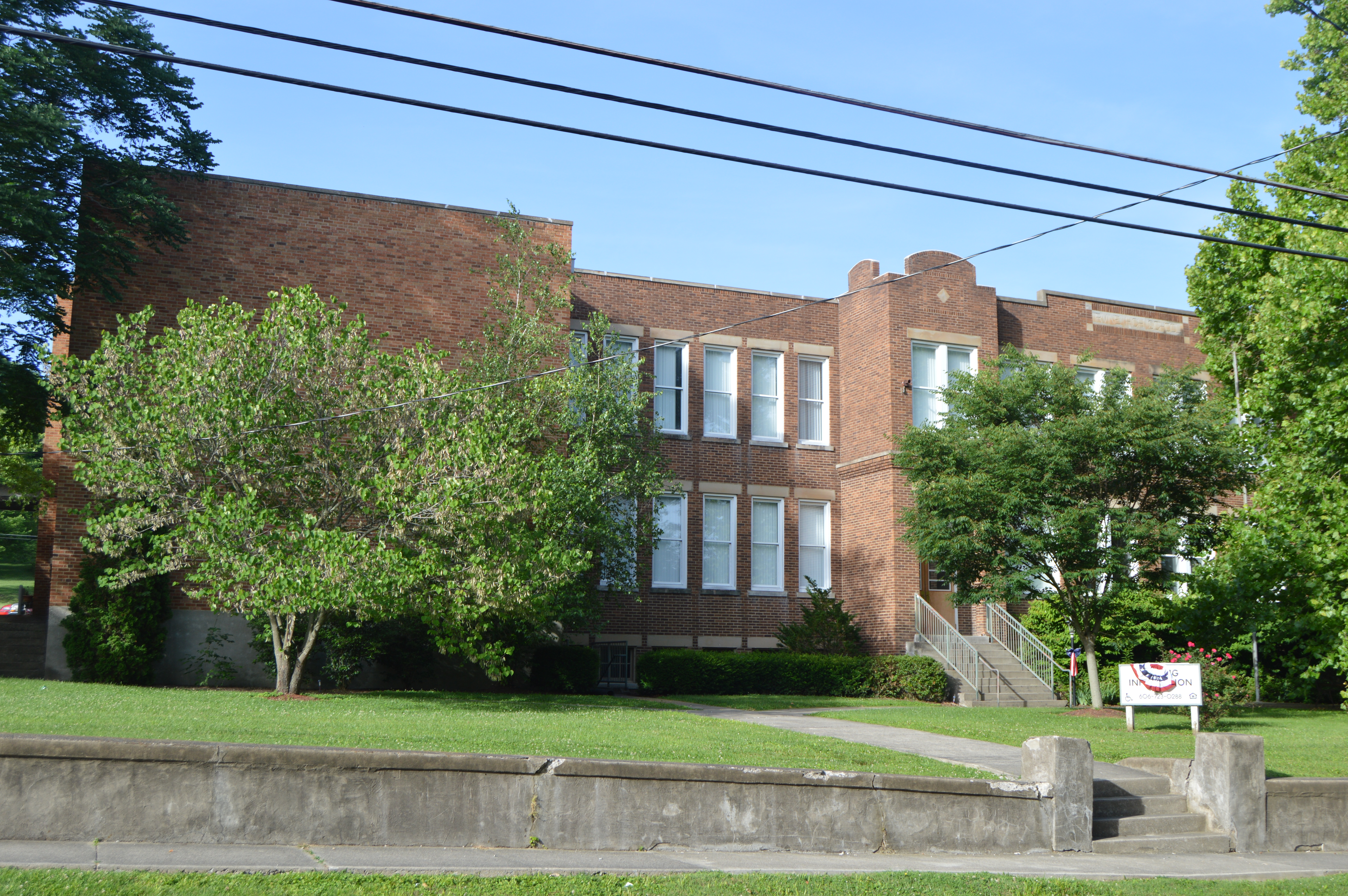

- Location within Kentucky Location within the United States
- Location: 228 Broadway, Irvine, Kentucky
- Coordinates: 37°41′54″N 83°58′06″W
- Area: 1.3 acres (0.53 ha)
- Built: 1920
- Architectural style: Mission/spanish Revival
- NRHP reference No.: 00000865
- Added to NRHP: August 18, 2000

The Irvine Grade School, at 229 Broadway in Irvine, Kentucky, was built in 1920. It was listed on the National Register of Historic Places in 2000.

It is a two-story Mission Style brick school building.

The property was left by the Estill County School District in 1998 which moved the Irvine Elementary School to a new building elsewhere. In 2000, the building was being "rehabilitated for use as senior citizen apartments and a community center by AU Associates of Lexington, Kentucky."
