= Ravenna Motor Vehicle Service Building =

- U.S. National Register of Historic Places
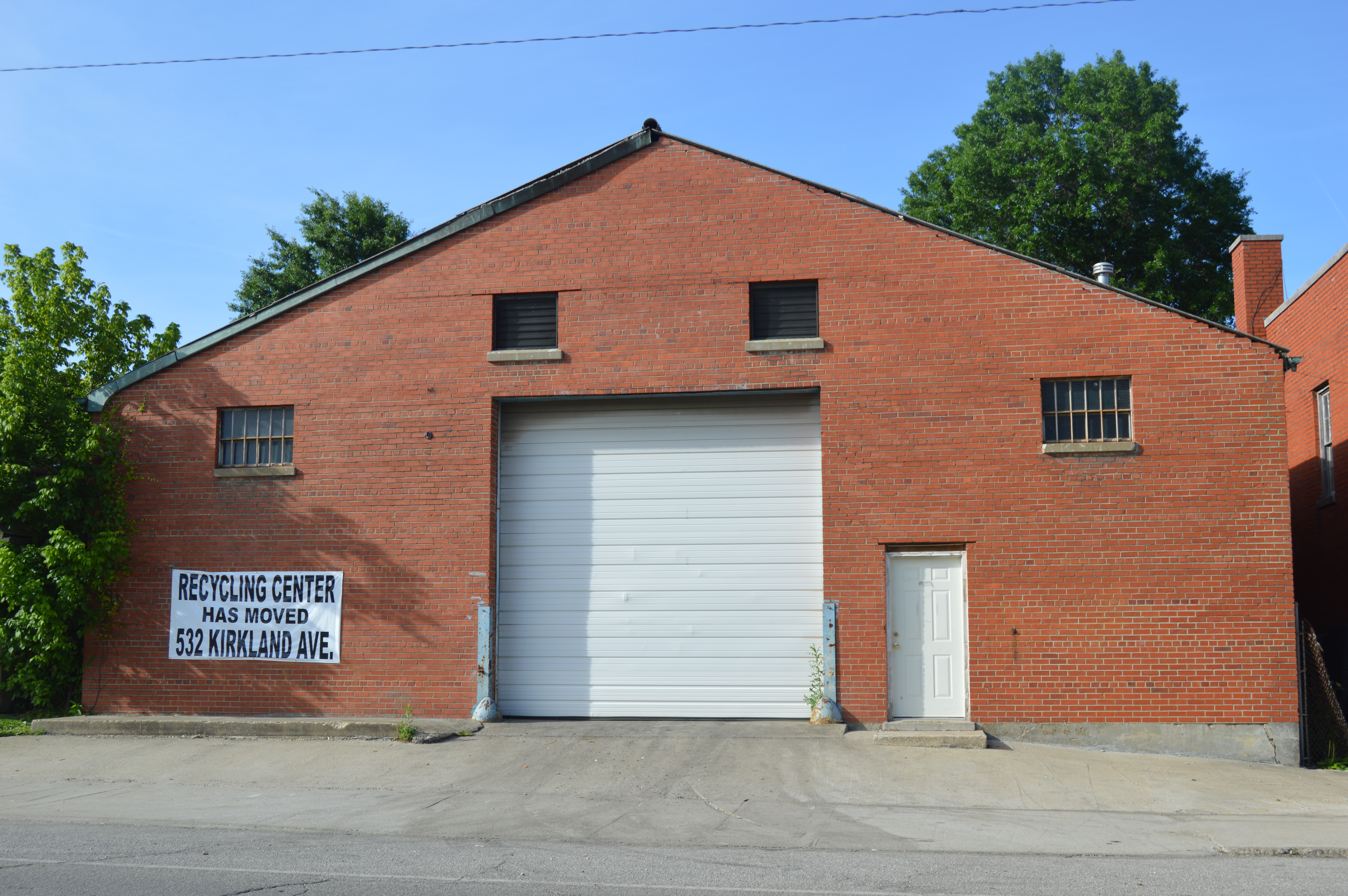
- Location: 512 Main St., Ravenna, Kentucky
- Coordinates: 37°41′04″N 83°57′09″W
- Area: less than one acre
- Built: 1949
- Architectural style: Modern Movement
- MPS: Kentucky's National Guard Facilities MPS
- NRHP reference No.: 00000278
- Added to NRHP: June 21, 2000

The Ravenna Motor Vehicle Service Building, at 512 Main St. in Ravenna, Kentucky, is a Modern Movement-style Kentucky National Guard building constructed in 1949. It was listed on the United States National Register of Historic Places in 2000.

It is a one-and-a-half-story red brick building with a large garage door centered on each of its ends. It is adjacent to the old Ravenna Armory, and was used as a storage facility for military vehicles and equipment.

== See also ==
- Bowling Green Organizational Maintenance Shop No. 10
