= Green River Knob =

Hill in Kentucky, USA

Coordinates: 37.1534071°N 84.8449485°W

Green River Knob is the tallest point in the Knobs region of Kentucky, United States, with an elevation of 1,789 feet. It is also the highest point in Kentucky outside the Eastern Coalfield. It is located at the border of Casey and Pulaski Counties. Green River Knob can be seen from a long distance, with Pilot Knob in Powell County and Indian Fort Mountain near Berea, Kentucky providing the best views.
