= Riverview Hotel (Irvine, Kentucky) =

- U.S. National Register of Historic Places
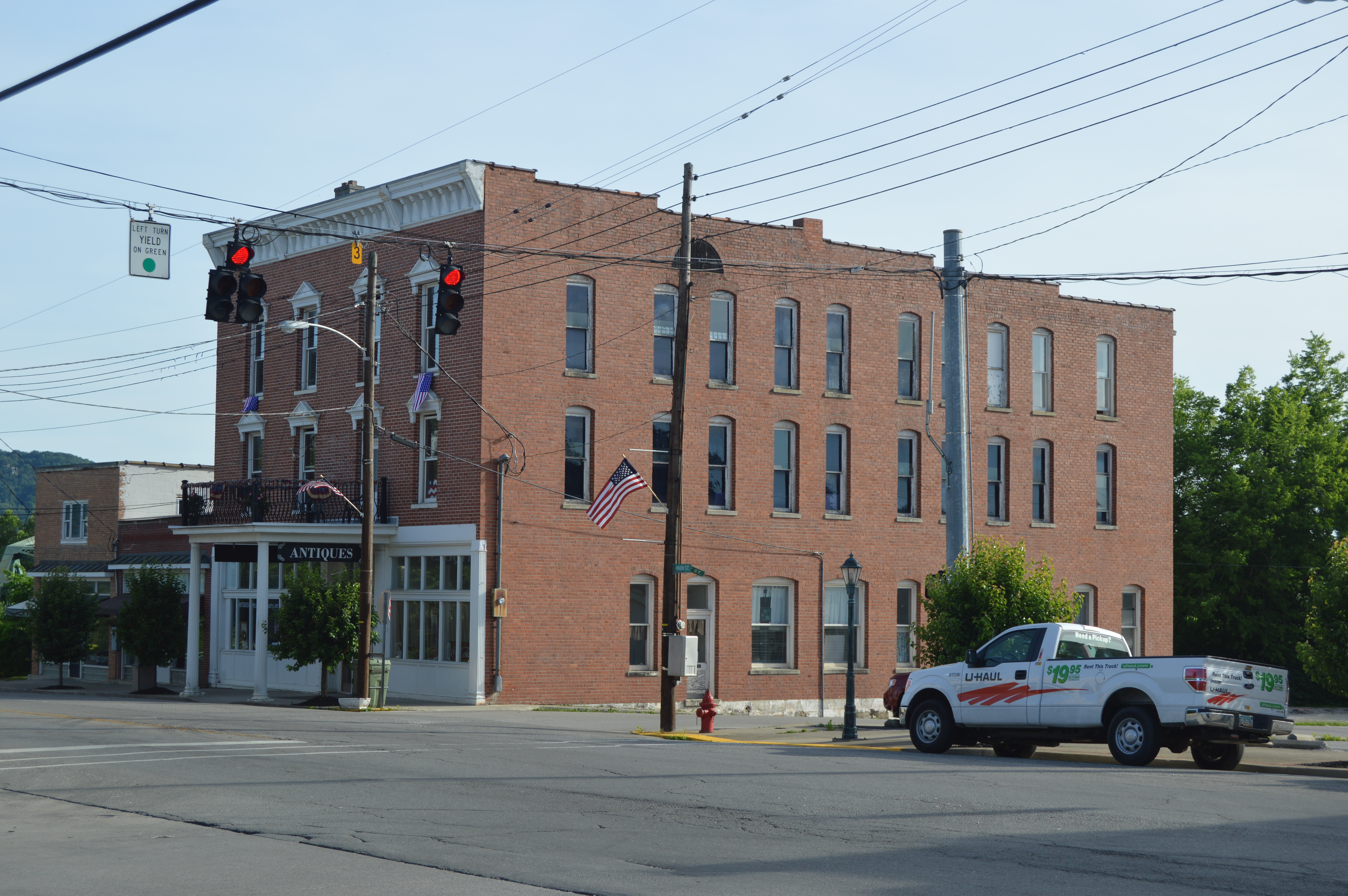

- Location within Kentucky Location within the United States
- Location: Main St., Irvine, Kentucky
- Coordinates: 37°41′58″N 83°58′31″W
- Area: less than one acre
- Built: c.1915
- Architectural style: Classical Revival
- NRHP reference No.: 92000171
- Added to NRHP: April 3, 1992

The Riverview Hotel, on Main St. in Irvine, Kentucky, is a Classical Revival-syle building which was constructed in 19. It was listed on the National Register of Historic Places in 1992.

It is a three-story brick building upon a stone foundation and was built sometime during 1913–18, during a period of oil exploration in the area.
