= Liberty, Kentucky =

- City
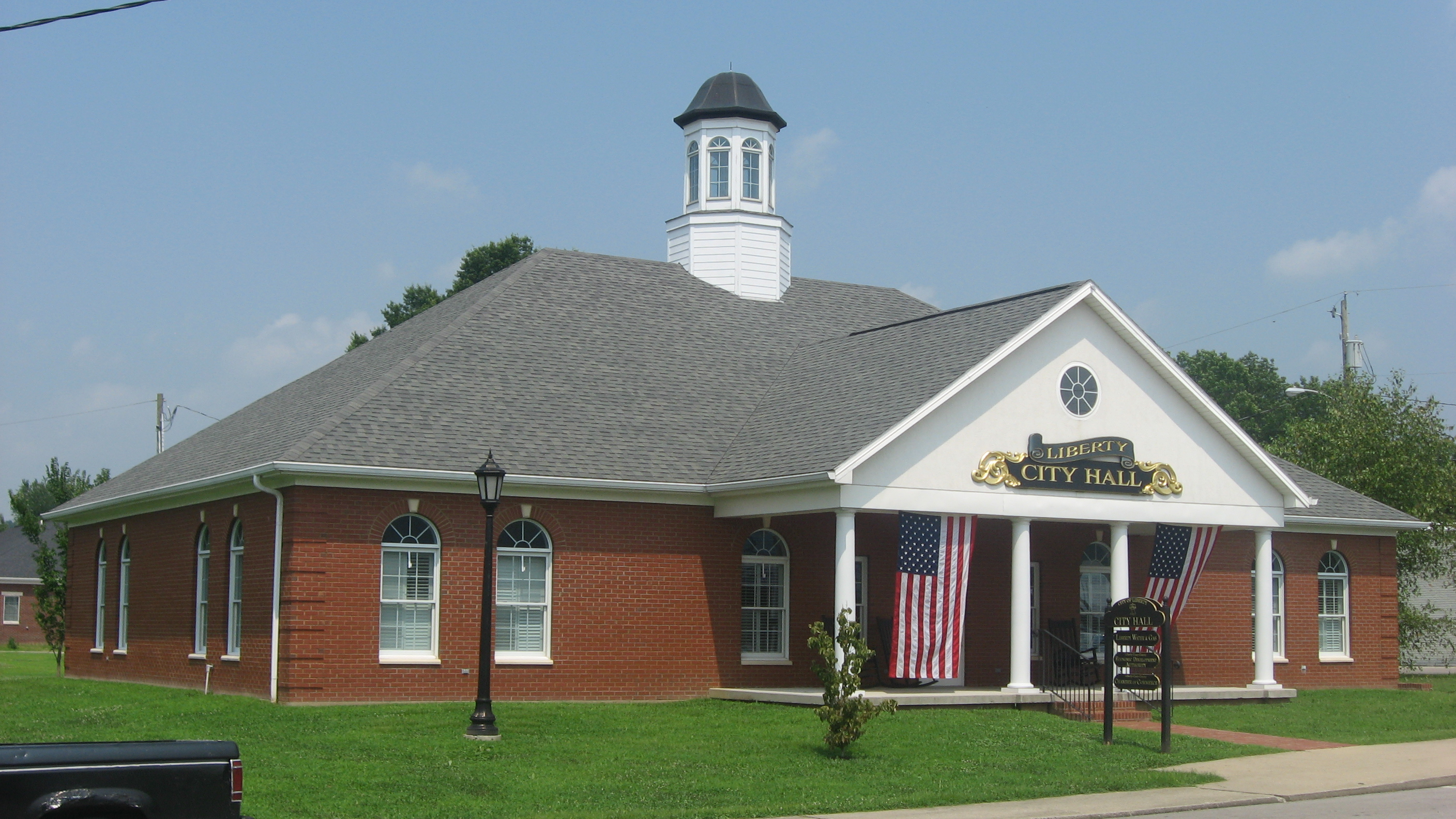
- City Hall

- Location of Liberty in Casey County, Kentucky.
- Coordinates: 37°19′14″N 84°55′43″W
- Country: United States
- State: Kentucky
- County: Casey
- Incorporated: 1860

Government
  - Mayor/Council: Sam Haddad

Area
  - Total: 1.88 sq mi (4.88 km^{2})
  - Land: 1.87 sq mi (4.85 km^{2})
  - Water: 0.015 sq mi (0.04 km^{2})
- Elevation: 810 ft (250 m)

Population (2020)
  - Total: 2,028
  - Estimate (2022): 2,011
  - Density: 1,084/sq mi (418.5/km^{2})
- Time zone: UTC-5 (Eastern (EST))
  - Summer (DST): UTC-4 (EDT)
- ZIP code: 42539
- Area code: 606
- FIPS code: 21-46072
- GNIS feature ID: 2404924
- Website: explorelibertyky.com

Liberty is a home rule-class city in Casey County, Kentucky, in the United States. It is the seat of its county. As of the 2020 census, Liberty had a population of 2,028.

== History ==
It was founded prior to 1806 by several Revolutionary War veterans upon their military grants and named out of patriotic sentiment. In 1808, it was made the seat of Casey County owing to its central location. The post office was opened in 1814. The town was formally established by the state assembly in 1830 and incorporated in 1860.

In 2012, the Kentucky Supreme Court struck down Liberty Police using road blocks as a means for writing tickets for failure to display a city sticker. They blasted Liberty for selecting the most intrusive means possible to achieve its goal.

== Geography ==
Liberty is located in central Casey County in the valley of the Green River. U.S. Route 127 passes through the city, leading north 26 miles (42 km) to Danville and south 21 miles (34 km) to Russell Springs. According to the United States Census Bureau, Liberty has a total area of 1.9 square miles (4.9 km^{2}), of which 0.01 square miles (0.03 km^{2}), or 0.71%, is water.

=== Climate ===
The climate in this area is characterized by hot, humid summers and generally mild to cold winters. According to the Köppen Climate Classification system, Liberty has a humid subtropical climate, abbreviated "Cfa" on climate maps.

== Demographics ==
Historical population
Census	Pop.	Note	%±
1810	33		—
1830	118		—
1840	135		14.4%
1890	136		—
1900	450		230.9%
1910	330		−26.7%
1920	368		11.5%
1930	549		49.2%
1940	676		23.1%
1950	1,291		91.0%
1960	1,578		22.2%
1970	1,765		11.9%
1980	2,206		25.0%
1990	1,937		−12.2%
2000	1,850		−4.5%
2010	2,168		17.2%
2020	2,028		−6.5%
2022 (est.)	2,011		−0.8%
U.S. Decennial Census

=== 2020 census ===
As of the 2020 census, Liberty had a population of 2,028. The median age was 40.0 years. 19.1% of residents were under the age of 18 and 23.2% of residents were 65 years of age or older. For every 100 females there were 75.7 males, and for every 100 females age 18 and over there were 67.7 males age 18 and over.

0.0% of residents lived in urban areas, while 100.0% lived in rural areas.

There were 777 households in Liberty, of which 27.8% had children under the age of 18 living in them. Of all households, 29.3% were married-couple households, 21.8% were households with a male householder and no spouse or partner present, and 41.8% were households with a female householder and no spouse or partner present. About 43.5% of all households were made up of individuals and 22.0% had someone living alone who was 65 years of age or older.

There were 935 housing units, of which 16.9% were vacant. The homeowner vacancy rate was 3.0% and the rental vacancy rate was 8.8%.

Racial composition as of the 2020 census
Race	Number	Percent
White	1,879	92.7%
Black or African American	24	1.2%
American Indian and Alaska Native	3	0.1%
Asian	9	0.4%
Native Hawaiian and Other Pacific Islander	1	0.0%
Some other race	45	2.2%
Two or more races	67	3.3%
Hispanic or Latino (of any race)	86	4.2%

=== 2000 census ===
As of the census of 2000, there were 1,850 people, 875 households, and 494 families residing in the city. The population density was 1,059.8 per square mile (409.2/km^{2}). There were 979 housing units at an average density of 560.8 per square mile (216.5/km^{2}). The racial makeup of the city was 98.16% White, 0.70% African American, 0.22% Native American, 0.05% Asian, 0.11% from other races, and 0.76% from two or more races. Hispanic or Latino of any race were 0.43% of the population.

There were 875 households, out of which 20.6% had children under the age of 18 living with them, 38.2% were married couples living together, 15.5% had a female householder with no husband present, and 43.5% were non-families. 41.1% of all households were made up of individuals, and 23.0% had someone living alone who was 65 years of age or older. The average household size was 1.98 and the average family size was 2.65.

In the city, the population was spread out, with 17.9% of the population under the age of 18, 7.7% from 18 to 24, 22.0% from 25 to 44, 24.4% from 45 to 64, and 28.0% who were 65 years of age or older. The median age was 47 years. For every 100 females, there were 76.0 males. For every 100 females age 18 and over, there were 70.9 males.

The median income for a household in the city was $18,525, and the median income for a family was $27,105. Males had a median income of $25,954 versus $18,173 for females. The per capita income for the city was $14,269. About 24.9% of families and 28.3% of the population were below the poverty line, including 37.6% of those under age 18 and 28.7% of those age 65 or over.

== Education ==
Casey County Schools operates public schools.

Liberty has a lending library, the Casey County Public Library.

== Media ==
The town is served by low-power community station WIHE-LP and full-power stations WKDO and WKDO-FM.

== Notable people ==
- Carl Mays, Major league baseball pitcher with the New York Yankees in the 1920s
- William N. Sweeney, congressman from Kentucky
- Wallace Wilkinson, governor of Kentucky
- Tim Butler, bassist of The Psychedelic Furs.
