= Estill County, Kentucky =

County in Kentucky, United States

- County
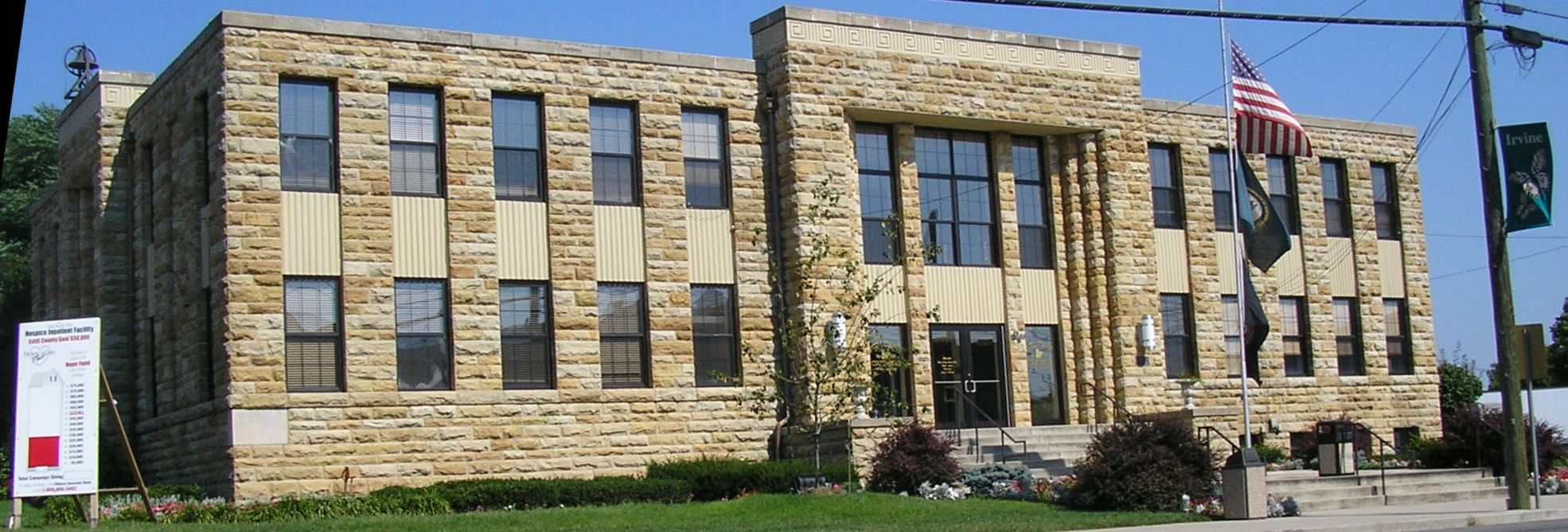
- Estill County courthouse in Irvine

- Location within the U.S. state of Kentucky
- Coordinates: 37°41′N 83°58′W
- Country: United States
- State: Kentucky
- Founded: 1808
- Named for: James Estill
- Seat: Irvine
- Largest city: Irvine

Government
  - Judge/Executive: Donnie Watson (R)

Area
  - Total: 256 sq mi (660 km^{2})
  - Land: 253 sq mi (660 km^{2})
  - Water: 2.5 sq mi (6.5 km^{2}) 1.0%

Population (2020)
  - Total: 14,163
  - Estimate (2025): 13,962 ▼
  - Density: 56.0/sq mi (21.6/km^{2})
- Time zone: UTC−5 (Eastern)
  - Summer (DST): UTC−4 (EDT)
- Congressional district: 6th
- Website: www.estillky.com

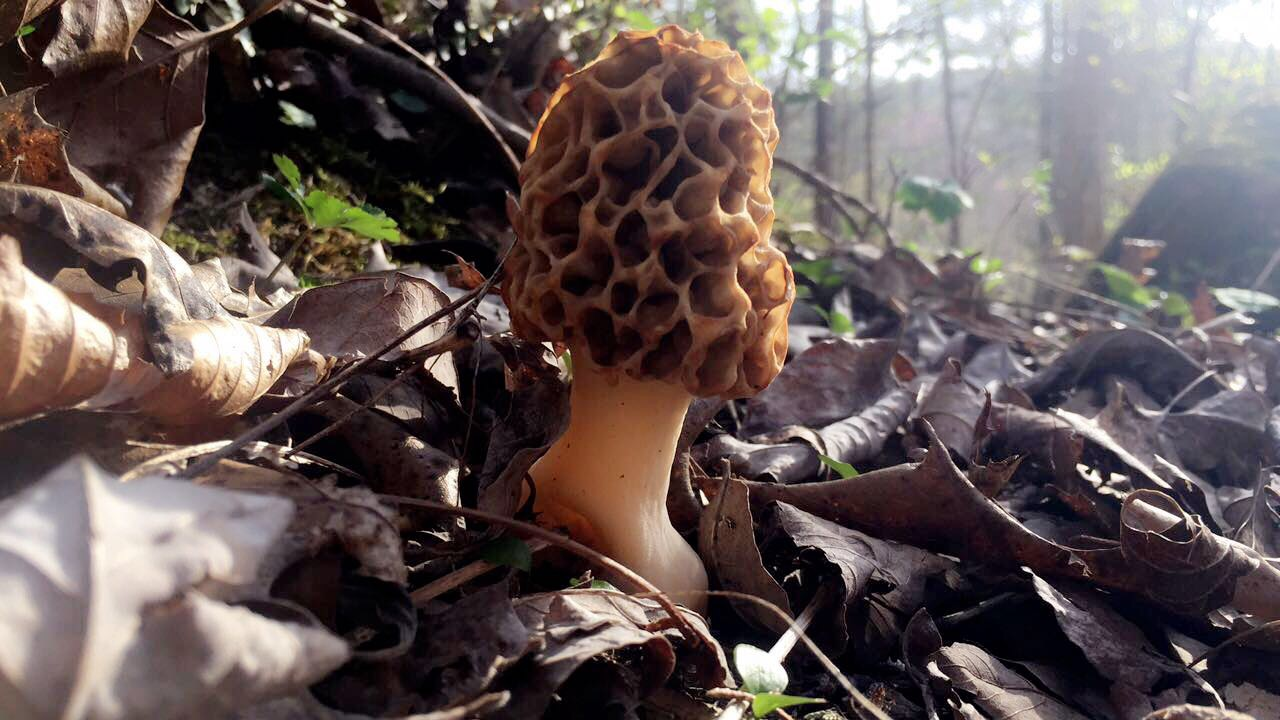
Morel Mushrooms are commonly found in Estill County in the spring, with Irvine's Mountain Mushroom Festival being dedicated to them.

Estill County is a county located in the U.S. state of Kentucky. As of the 2020 census, the population was 14,163. Its county seat is Irvine. The county was formed in 1808 and named for Captain James Estill, a Kentucky militia officer who was killed in the Battle of Little Mountain during the American Revolutionary War. Estill County is a moist county meaning that the county seat, the city of Irvine, allows the sale of alcohol after the October 9, 2013, vote, but not the rest of Estill County outside the Irvine city limits. Estill County has two adjacent towns, known as the twin cities, Irvine and Ravenna. Both cities sit along the Kentucky River in the central part of the county. Ravenna is home to a former CSX Transportation facility, now owned by Kentucky Steam Heritage Corporation for the restoration of Chesapeake and Ohio 2716. It conducts the Ravenna Railroad Festival annually in late summer, and the historic Fitchburg & Cottage Furnaces are located here. Irvine hosts the annual Mountain Mushroom Festival over the last weekend of April, which celebrates the abundant Morel Mushrooms found in the region.

== History ==
Estill County was formed in 1808 from land given by Clark and Madison counties, it was Kentucky's 50th county. It was originally settled by European settlers entering Kentucky via old buffalo and Indian trails and traveling through Boonesborough in what is today Madison County.

Estill County was one of the first areas in the United States to experience early industrialization, with iron mining and smelting beginning in 1810. The iron industry would go on to thrive in Estill County for decades, with the ruins of the Estill furnace, the Cottage furnace, and the Fitchburg Furnace still being visible today. The Fitchburg furnace was a particularly impressive engineering feat. Standing 81 feet tall, the furnace is the largest charcoal furnace in the world, and one of the largest 25 dry-stone masonry structures in the world. The iron industry declined after the Civil War when iron deposits and timber to fire the furnaces were depleted, and innovation made charcoal furnaces obsolete. During the Civil War Estill County was strongly pro-union, similar to surrounding counties, especially to the southeast.

Additionally, the county was historically known for the Estill Springs summer resort, situated near mineral springs in Irvine. This resort was a popular vacation site for many prominent Kentuckians in the 19th century, with men including Henry Clay, John Crittenden, and John C. Breckinridge vacationing there. The current courthouse, built in 1941, replaced a structure dating from the 1860s.

== Geography ==
According to the United States Census Bureau, the county has a total area of 256 square miles (660 km^{2}), of which 253 square miles (660 km^{2}) is land and 2.5 square miles (6.5 km^{2}) (1.0%) is water. Estill County is located at the contact of two Kentucky regions: the Bluegrass and the Cumberland plateau, because of this the county is known as the location where the "Bluegrass kisses the Mountains."

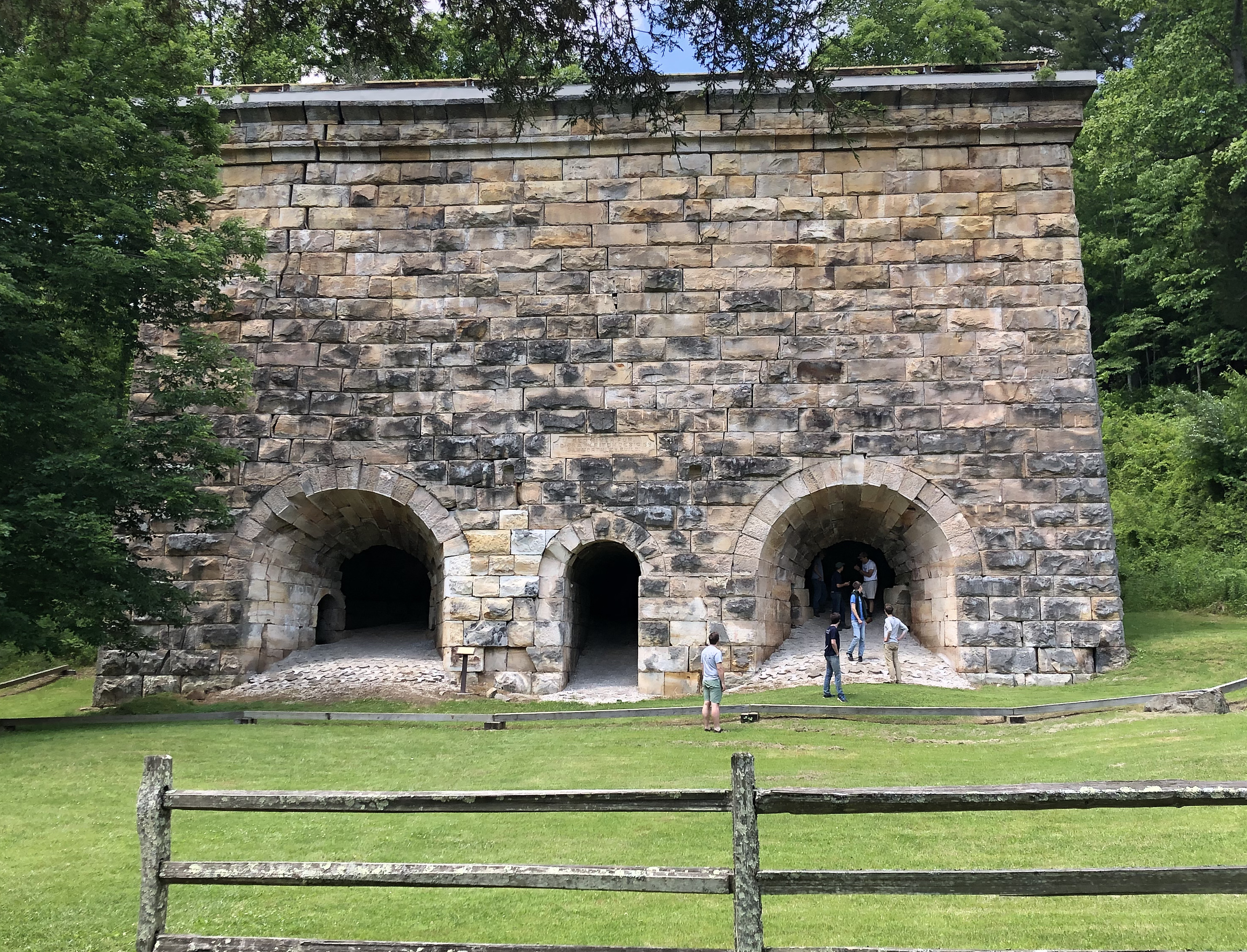
Fitchburg Furnace located in Estill County. Legacy of 19th century iron industry. Largest charcoal furnace in the world.

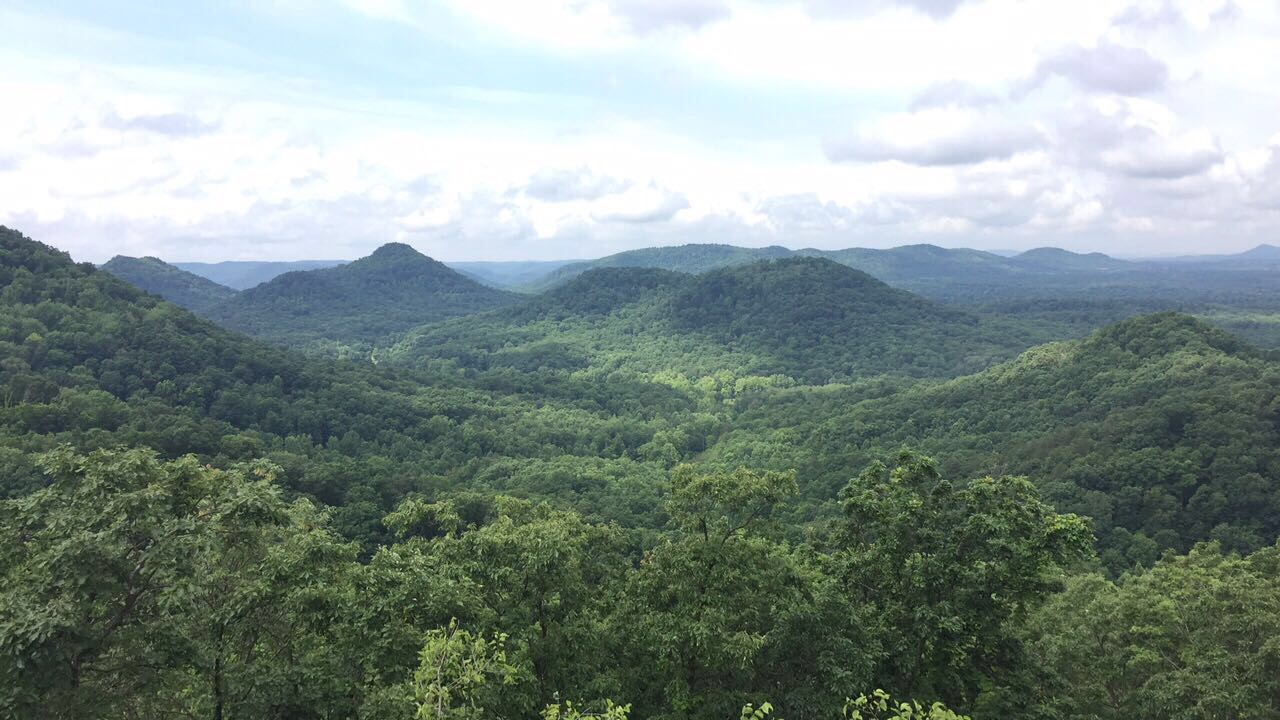
Knobs viewed from the Lilly Mountain Nature Preserve in southwestern Estill County

Estill County contains two important rivers. With the Red River, famous for its gorge in neighboring Powell County, forming the northern border. And the Kentucky River bisecting the county. Much of Estill County's development, including the towns of Irvine and Ravenna, is located in the fertile bottomlands of the Kentucky River. Additionally, due to the Kentucky River's deep valley and Estill County's location at the edge of the Cumberland plateau the county's topography is striking. The Pottsville Escarpment is prominent in the county, marking the divide between the Bluegrass and the mountains. Because of this topography total relief is nearly 1000 feet in the county, with the highest point being Zion Mountain, located about 6 1/2 miles southwest of Irvine at 1,511 feet, and the lowest point being the confluence of the Kentucky River and the Red River at 566 feet. Other high points include Happy Top Mountain, 1,500 feet; Preacher Estes Mountain, 1,475 feet; Peter Mountain, 1,454 feet; Low Knob, 1,450 feet; and Big Round Mountain, Buzzard Roost, and McKinney Mountain, each at 1,420 feet.

=== Rivers and streams ===
- Drowning Creek Crooked Creek

=== Adjacent counties ===
- Clark County (north)
- Powell County (northeast)
- Lee County (southeast)
- Jackson County (south)
- Madison County (west)

=== Protected areas ===
- Daniel Boone National Forest (part)
- Lilly Mountain Nature Preserve

== Demographics ==
Historical population
Census	Pop.	Note	%±
1810	2,082		—
1820	3,507		68.4%
1830	4,618		31.7%
1840	5,535		19.9%
1850	5,985		8.1%
1860	6,886		15.1%
1870	9,198		33.6%
1880	9,860		7.2%
1890	10,836		9.9%
1900	11,669		7.7%
1910	12,273		5.2%
1920	15,569		26.9%
1930	17,079		9.7%
1940	17,978		5.3%
1950	14,677		−18.4%
1960	12,466		−15.1%
1970	12,752		2.3%
1980	14,495		13.7%
1990	14,614		0.8%
2000	15,307		4.7%
2010	14,672		−4.1%
2020	14,163		−3.5%
2025 (est.)	13,962	▼	−1.4%
U.S. Decennial Census; 1790-1960 1900-1990; 1990-2000 2010-2020

=== 2020 census ===
As of the 2020 census, the county had a population of 14,163. The median age was 44.4 years. 21.7% of residents were under the age of 18 and 19.6% of residents were 65 years of age or older. For every 100 females there were 97.0 males, and for every 100 females age 18 and over there were 94.9 males age 18 and over.

The racial makeup of the county was 96.5% White, 0.2% Black or African American, 0.2% American Indian and Alaska Native, 0.0% Asian, 0.0% Native Hawaiian and Pacific Islander, 0.2% from some other race, and 2.8% from two or more races. Hispanic or Latino residents of any race comprised 0.9% of the population.

28.4% of residents lived in urban areas, while 71.6% lived in rural areas.

There were 5,875 households in the county, of which 28.8% had children under the age of 18 living with them and 27.7% had a female householder with no spouse or partner present. About 29.4% of all households were made up of individuals and 12.9% had someone living alone who was 65 years of age or older.

There were 6,827 housing units, of which 13.9% were vacant. Among occupied housing units, 70.8% were owner-occupied and 29.2% were renter-occupied. The homeowner vacancy rate was 1.7% and the rental vacancy rate was 4.8%.

=== 2000 census ===
As of the census of 2000, there were 15,307 people, 6,108 households, and 4,434 families residing in the county. The population density was 60 per square mile (23/km^{2}). There were 6,824 housing units at an average density of 27 per square mile (10/km^{2}). The racial makeup of the county was 99.07% White, 0.11% Black or African American, 0.24% Native American, 0.03% Asian, 0.06% from other races, and 0.49% from two or more races. 0.53% of the population were Hispanic or Latino of any race.

There were 6,108 households, out of which 32.30% had children under the age of 18 living with them, 55.40% were married couples living together, 12.90% had a female householder with no husband present, and 27.40% were non-families. 24.60% of all households were made up of individuals, and 10.70% had someone living alone who was 65 years of age or older. The average household size was 2.48 and the average family size was 2.94.

In the county, the population was spread out, with 24.20% under the age of 18, 9.10% from 18 to 24, 29.20% from 25 to 44, 24.20% from 45 to 64, and 13.50% who were 65 years of age or older. The median age was 37 years. For every 100 females there were 93.80 males. For every 100 females age 18 and over, there were 91.20 males.

The median income for a household in the county was $23,318, and the median income for a family was $27,284. Males had a median income of $29,254 versus $18,849 for females. The per capita income for the county was $12,285. About 22.50% of families and 26.40% of the population were below the poverty line, including 32.30% of those under age 18 and 21.50% of those age 65 or over.

== Politics ==
United States presidential election results for Estill County, Kentucky
Year	Republican		Democratic		Third party(ies)	
Year	No.	%	No.	%	No.	%
1912	869	41.09%	875	41.37%	371	17.54%
1916	1,524	55.93%	1,180	43.30%	21	0.77%
1920	2,552	58.17%	1,823	41.55%	12	0.27%
1924	2,152	48.64%	2,052	46.38%	220	4.97%
1928	3,641	65.82%	1,886	34.09%	5	0.09%
1932	2,963	48.29%	3,150	51.34%	23	0.37%
1936	2,931	52.43%	2,646	47.33%	13	0.23%
1940	2,889	52.66%	2,587	47.16%	10	0.18%
1944	2,493	55.19%	2,000	44.28%	24	0.53%
1948	2,056	50.18%	1,937	47.28%	104	2.54%
1952	2,630	57.80%	1,900	41.76%	20	0.44%
1956	2,946	60.52%	1,912	39.28%	10	0.21%
1960	3,238	64.85%	1,755	35.15%	0	0.00%
1964	1,996	48.66%	2,105	51.32%	1	0.02%
1968	2,236	53.57%	1,261	30.21%	677	16.22%
1972	3,054	69.42%	1,322	30.05%	23	0.52%
1976	2,250	52.16%	2,034	47.15%	30	0.70%
1980	2,818	57.97%	1,965	40.42%	78	1.60%
1984	3,512	68.57%	1,593	31.10%	17	0.33%
1988	3,077	64.18%	1,692	35.29%	25	0.52%
1992	2,453	48.68%	1,837	36.46%	749	14.86%
1996	2,220	49.89%	1,724	38.74%	506	11.37%
2000	3,033	64.39%	1,591	33.78%	86	1.83%
2004	3,633	65.17%	1,907	34.21%	35	0.63%
2008	3,685	69.35%	1,555	29.26%	74	1.39%
2012	3,749	72.32%	1,356	26.16%	79	1.52%
2016	4,236	76.39%	1,108	19.98%	201	3.62%
2020	5,100	77.98%	1,355	20.72%	85	1.30%
2024	5,091	80.94%	1,114	17.71%	85	1.35%

Although it lies in the Bluegrass and Knobs regions, Estill County was more akin to the eastern Pennyroyal Plateau to its southwest in being strongly pro-Union during the Civil War. Indeed, a larger proportion of Estill County's population volunteered for the Union Army than the population of any free state, or of any Kentucky county except the famous Republican bastion of Owsley County.

=== Elected officials ===
Elected officials as of January 3, 2025
U.S. House	Andy Barr (R)	KY 6
Ky. Senate	Brandon Smith (R)	30
Ky. House	Bill Wesley (R)	91

== Communities ==
=== Cities ===
- Irvine (county seat)
- Ravenna

=== Other communities ===
- Barnes Mountain
- Cobhill
- Cressy
- Crystal
- Drip Rock
- Fox
- Furnace
- Hargett
- Leighton
- Palmer
- Patsey
- Pryse
- Red Lick
- South Irvine
- Spout Springs
- Tipton Ridge
- Wisemantown
- Winston

== See also ==
- Estill County Schools
- National Register of Historic Places listings in Estill County, Kentucky
