= Casey County, Kentucky =

County in Kentucky, United States

- County
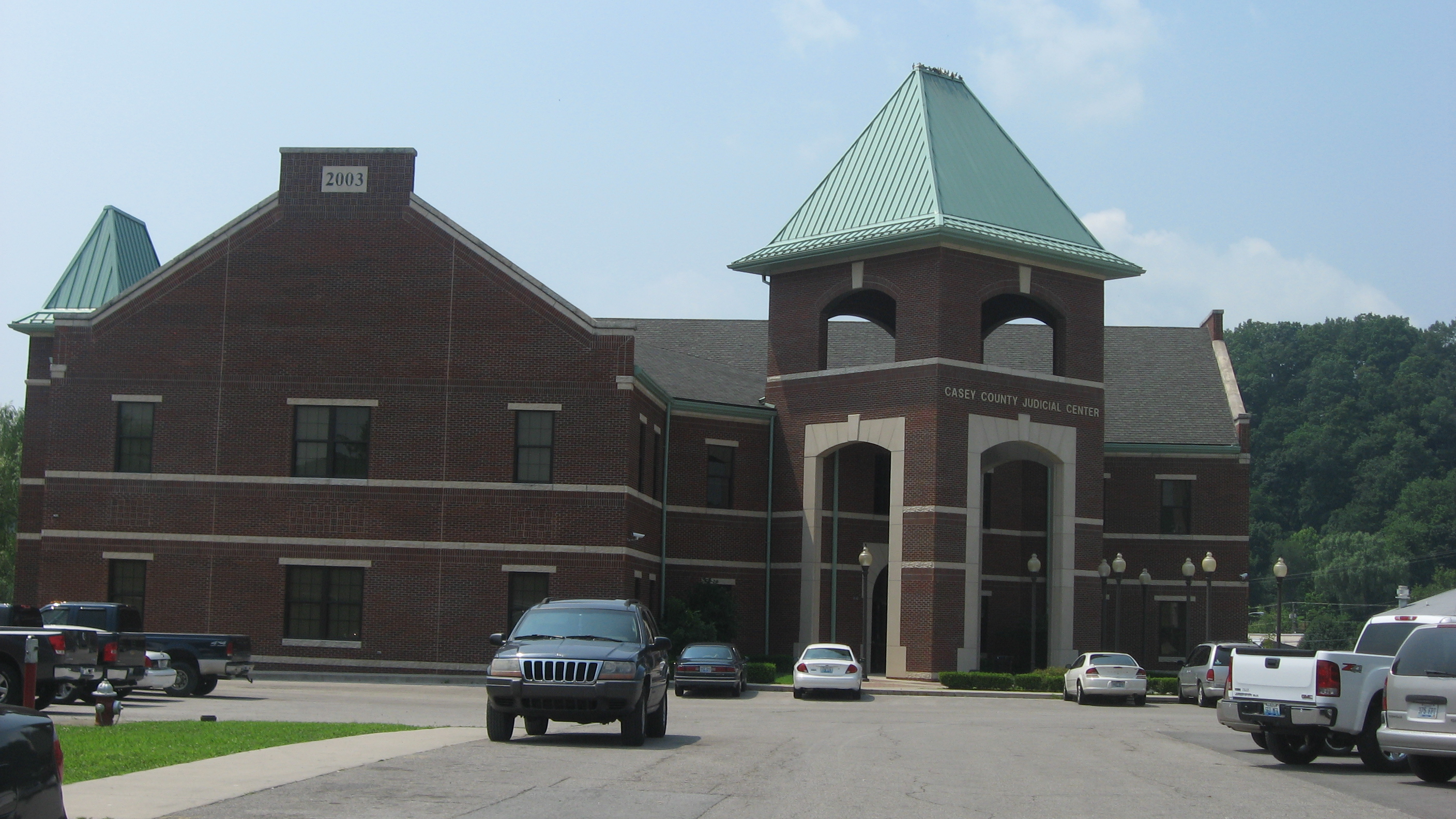
- Casey County courthouse in Liberty

- Location within the U.S. state of Kentucky
- Coordinates: 37°19′N 84°56′W
- Country: United States
- State: Kentucky
- Founded: November 14, 1806
- Named for: Colonel William Casey
- Seat: Liberty
- Largest city: Liberty

Government
  - Judge/Executive: Randy Dial (R)

Area
  - Total: 446 sq mi (1,160 km^{2})
  - Land: 444 sq mi (1,150 km^{2})
  - Water: 1.5 sq mi (3.9 km^{2}) 0.3%

Population (2020)
  - Total: 15,941
  - Estimate (2025): 16,205 ▲
  - Density: 35.9/sq mi (13.9/km^{2})
- Time zone: UTC−5 (Eastern)
  - Summer (DST): UTC−4 (EDT)
- Congressional district: 1st
- Website: caseycountyclerk.ky.gov

Casey County is a county located in the U.S. Commonwealth of Kentucky. As of the 2020 census, the population was 15,941. Its county seat is Liberty. The county was formed in 1806 from the western part of Lincoln County and named for Colonel William Casey, a pioneer settler who moved his family to Kentucky in 1779. It is the only Kentucky county entirely in the Knobs region. Casey County is home to annual Casey County Apple Festival. It is considered part of the Appalachian region of Kentucky.

== History ==
Casey County was established in 1806 from land given by Lincoln County. The third and present courthouse was built in 1888.

In 2015, County Clerk Casey Davis received national press when he announced he would deny same-sex marriage licenses, as a show of solidarity with fellow county clerk Kim Davis (no relation), who was criticized and later jailed for doing the same thing in Rowan County, Kentucky.

== Geography ==
According to the United States Census Bureau, the county has a total area of 446 square miles (1,160 km^{2}), of which 444 square miles (1,150 km^{2}) is land and 1.5 square miles (3.9 km^{2}) (0.3%) is water.

The highest point in Casey County is Green River Knob at 1,789 feet (545 m).

=== Adjacent counties ===
- Boyle County (north)
- Lincoln County (east)
- Pulaski County (southeast)
- Russell County (south/CST Border)
- Adair County (southwest/CST Border)
- Taylor County (west)
- Marion County (northwest)

=== Major highways ===
- KY 80
- US 127
- KY 49
- KY 70
- KY 78
- KY 198
- KY 243
- KY 910

== Demographics ==
Historical population
| Census | Pop. | Note | %± |
|---|---|---|---|
| 1810 | 3,285 | | — |
| 1820 | 4,349 | | 32.4% |
| 1830 | 4,342 | | −0.2% |
| 1840 | 4,939 | | 13.7% |
| 1850 | 6,556 | | 32.7% |
| 1860 | 6,466 | | −1.4% |
| 1870 | 8,884 | | 37.4% |
| 1880 | 10,983 | | 23.6% |
| 1890 | 11,848 | | 7.9% |
| 1900 | 15,144 | | 27.8% |
| 1910 | 15,479 | | 2.2% |
| 1920 | 17,213 | | 11.2% |
| 1930 | 16,747 | | −2.7% |
| 1940 | 19,962 | | 19.2% |
| 1950 | 17,446 | | −12.6% |
| 1960 | 14,327 | | −17.9% |
| 1970 | 12,930 | | −9.8% |
| 1980 | 14,818 | | 14.6% |
| 1990 | 14,211 | | −4.1% |
| 2000 | 15,447 | | 8.7% |
| 2010 | 15,955 | | 3.3% |
| 2020 | 15,941 | | −0.1% |
| 2025 (est.) | 16,205 | ▲ | 1.7% |
U.S. Decennial Census; 1790-1960 1900-1990; 1990-2000 2010-2020

=== 2020 census ===
As of the 2020 census, the county had a population of 15,941. The median age was 41.5 years. 24.3% of residents were under the age of 18 and 19.9% of residents were 65 years of age or older. For every 100 females there were 96.3 males, and for every 100 females age 18 and over there were 92.8 males age 18 and over.

The racial makeup of the county was 93.9% White, 0.5% Black or African American, 0.3% American Indian and Alaska Native, 0.3% Asian, 0.0% Native Hawaiian and Pacific Islander, 2.1% from some other race, and 2.8% from two or more races. Hispanic or Latino residents of any race comprised 3.4% of the population.

0.0% of residents lived in urban areas, while 100.0% lived in rural areas.

There were 6,270 households in the county, of which 29.6% had children under the age of 18 living with them and 26.4% had a female householder with no spouse or partner present. About 30.0% of all households were made up of individuals and 15.2% had someone living alone who was 65 years of age or older.

There were 7,366 housing units, of which 14.9% were vacant. Among occupied housing units, 76.2% were owner-occupied and 23.8% were renter-occupied. The homeowner vacancy rate was 1.7% and the rental vacancy rate was 6.5%.

Casey County is the county in the United States with the highest proportion of Midwest Beachy Amish adherents, with 1.11% of the population in 2020 subscribing to the denomination.

=== 2000 census ===
As of the census of 2000, there were 15,447 people, 6,260 households, and 4,419 families residing in the county. The population density was 35 per square mile (14/km^{2}). There were 7,242 housing units at an average density of 16 per square mile (6.2/km^{2}). The racial makeup of the county was 98.30% White, 0.33% Black or African American, 0.28% Native American, 0.06% Asian, 0.05% Pacific Islander, 0.31% from other races, and 0.66% from two or more races. 1.28% of the population were Hispanic or Latino of any race.

There were 6,260 households, out of which 31.00% had children under the age of 18 living with them, 56.10% were married couples living together, 10.80% had a female householder with no husband present, and 29.40% were non-families. 26.80% of all households were made up of individuals, and 12.60% had someone living alone who was 65 years of age or older. The average household size was 2.44 and the average family size was 2.94.

24.50% of the population was under the age of 18, 8.20% from 18 to 24, 27.50% from 25 to 44, 24.70% from 45 to 64, and 15.10% who were 65 years of age or older. The median age was 38 years. For every 100 females there were 95.60 males. For every 100 females age 18 and over, there were 92.60 males.

The median income for a household in the county was $21,580, and the median income for a family was $27,044. Males had a median income of $22,283 versus $17,885 for females. The per capita income for the county was $12,867. About 20.70% of families and 25.50% of the population were below the poverty line, including 32.10% of those under age 18 and 29.60% of those age 65 or over.

== Politics ==
United States presidential election results for Casey County, Kentucky
| Year | Republican | | Democratic | | Third party(ies) | |
| Year | No. | % | No. | % | No. | % |
|---|---|---|---|---|---|---|
| 1912 | 902 | 31.23% | 1,158 | 40.10% | 828 | 28.67% |
| 1916 | 1,949 | 58.37% | 1,352 | 40.49% | 38 | 1.14% |
| 1920 | 3,543 | 64.03% | 1,951 | 35.26% | 39 | 0.70% |
| 1924 | 3,120 | 63.03% | 1,797 | 36.30% | 33 | 0.67% |
| 1928 | 3,805 | 71.39% | 1,519 | 28.50% | 6 | 0.11% |
| 1932 | 3,840 | 58.93% | 2,651 | 40.68% | 25 | 0.38% |
| 1936 | 3,588 | 64.84% | 1,925 | 34.78% | 21 | 0.38% |
| 1940 | 3,874 | 67.34% | 1,862 | 32.37% | 17 | 0.30% |
| 1944 | 3,869 | 71.53% | 1,520 | 28.10% | 20 | 0.37% |
| 1948 | 3,380 | 68.32% | 1,495 | 30.22% | 72 | 1.46% |
| 1952 | 3,831 | 71.39% | 1,522 | 28.36% | 13 | 0.24% |
| 1956 | 4,167 | 72.48% | 1,570 | 27.31% | 12 | 0.21% |
| 1960 | 4,811 | 77.30% | 1,413 | 22.70% | 0 | 0.00% |
| 1964 | 3,457 | 64.54% | 1,875 | 35.01% | 24 | 0.45% |
| 1968 | 3,698 | 70.64% | 879 | 16.79% | 658 | 12.57% |
| 1972 | 3,727 | 78.83% | 913 | 19.31% | 88 | 1.86% |
| 1976 | 3,379 | 67.15% | 1,602 | 31.84% | 51 | 1.01% |
| 1980 | 4,239 | 75.27% | 1,298 | 23.05% | 95 | 1.69% |
| 1984 | 4,356 | 79.01% | 1,122 | 20.35% | 35 | 0.63% |
| 1988 | 3,857 | 75.38% | 1,216 | 23.76% | 44 | 0.86% |
| 1992 | 3,317 | 62.56% | 1,409 | 26.57% | 576 | 10.86% |
| 1996 | 3,187 | 65.40% | 1,106 | 22.70% | 580 | 11.90% |
| 2000 | 4,284 | 78.33% | 1,122 | 20.52% | 63 | 1.15% |
| 2004 | 5,109 | 80.83% | 1,174 | 18.57% | 38 | 0.60% |
| 2008 | 4,679 | 78.55% | 1,219 | 20.46% | 59 | 0.99% |
| 2012 | 4,904 | 80.51% | 1,086 | 17.83% | 101 | 1.66% |
| 2016 | 5,482 | 85.14% | 767 | 11.91% | 190 | 2.95% |
| 2020 | 6,179 | 86.17% | 918 | 12.80% | 74 | 1.03% |
| 2024 | 6,216 | 87.80% | 804 | 11.36% | 60 | 0.85% |

Forming what is traditionally part of the “Unionist South” or “Unionist Appalachia,” Casey County has one of the longest streaks of voting for Republican Party candidates in presidential elections in Kentucky & nationwide, with its candidates gaining the majority of the vote by wide margins in every election from 1916 on. No Democratic presidential candidate has won more than 30% of the county's vote since Jimmy Carter in 1976.

=== Elected officials ===
Elected officials as of January 3, 2025
| U.S. House | James Comer (R) | KY 1 |
| Ky. Senate | Brandon J. Storm (R) | 21 |
| Ky. House | Daniel Elliott (R) | 54 |

== Education ==
Casey County Schools operates public schools.

== Communities ==
=== City ===
- Liberty (county seat)

=== Unincorporated communities ===
- Bethelridge
- Clementsville
- Creston
- Dunnville
- Middleburg
- Phil
- Jacktown
- Penetralia
- Teddy
- Upper Tygart
- Walltown
- Windsor
- Yosemite

== Notable people ==
- Silas Adams, member of the United States House of Representatives (1893–1895)
- Tim Butler, The Psychedelic Furs bass player
- Charles T. Wethington Jr., former president of the University of Kentucky
- Crystal Wilkinson, author
- Wallace G. Wilkinson, governor of Kentucky (1987–1991)

== See also ==
- Dry counties
- National Register of Historic Places listings in Casey County, Kentucky
