= List of counties in Kentucky =

Counties of Kentucky
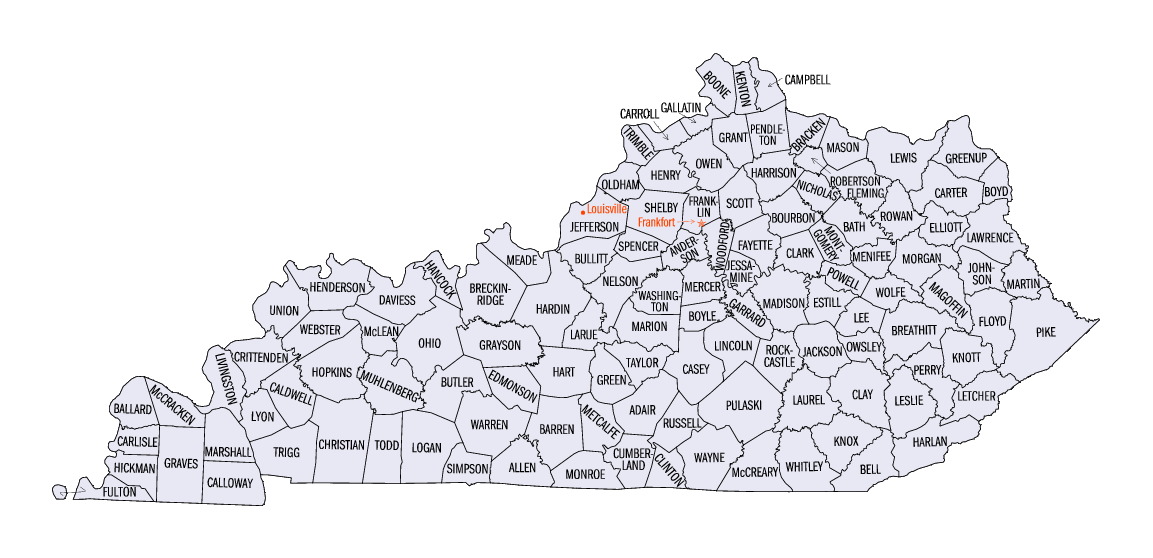
- Location: Commonwealth of Kentucky
- Number: 120
- Populations: 2,325 (Robertson) – 795,222 (Jefferson)
- Areas: 100 square miles (260 km^{2}) (Robertson) – 788 square miles (2,040 km^{2}) (Pike)
- Government: County government

There are 120 counties in the U.S. Commonwealth of Kentucky. Despite ranking 37th in size by area, Kentucky has 120 counties, fourth among states (including Virginia's independent cities). The original motivation for having so many counties was to ensure that residents in the days of poor roads and horseback travel could make a round trip from their home to the county seat in a single day, as well as being able to travel from one county seat to the next in the same fashion. Later, however, politics began to play a part, with citizens who disagreed with their county government petitioning the state to create a new county. Today, 22 of the 120 counties have fewer than 10,000 residents, and half have fewer than 20,000. The 20 largest counties by population all have populations of 50,000 or higher, and just 8 of the 120 have a population of 100,000 or higher. The average county population, based on the estimated 2025 state population of 4.606 million, was 38,391.

Following concerns of too many counties, the 1891 Kentucky Constitution placed stricter limits on county creation, stipulating that a new county:

- must have a land area of at least 400 square miles (1,036 km^{2});
- must have a population of at least 12,000 people;
- must not by its creation reduce the land area of an existing county to less than 400 square miles;
- must not by its creation reduce the population of an existing county to fewer than 12,000 people;
- must not create a county boundary line that passes within 10 miles (16 kilometers) of an existing county seat.

These regulations have reined in the proliferation of counties in Kentucky. Since the 1891 Constitution, only McCreary County has been legally created, in 1912. The General Assembly's creation of Beckham County in 1904 was ruled unconstitutional. Because today's largest county by area, Pike County, is 788 square miles (2,041 km^{2}), it is only still possible to form a new county from portions of more than one existing county; McCreary County was formed in this manner, from parts of Wayne, Pulaski and Whitley counties.

Kentucky was originally a single county in Virginia, created in 1776. In 1780, Kentucky County was divided into Fayette, Jefferson, and Lincoln counties. Kentucky was admitted as a state in 1792, when it had nine counties.

Each county has a legislative council called the Fiscal Court; despite the name, it no longer has any responsibility for judicial proceedings. The county judge/executive, the head of government of the county, is an ex officio member of the fiscal court and its presiding officer. Constitutionally, the fiscal court may either be composed of the magistrates for the county or of three commissioners elected from the county at large.

The largest city in Kentucky, Louisville, is a consolidated local government under KRS 67C. When the Louisville Metro government was formed, all incorporated cities in Jefferson County, apart from Louisville, retained their status as cities; however, the Louisville Metro Council is the main government for the entire county, and is elected by residents in all of Jefferson County. The second largest, Lexington, is an urban-county government under KRS 67A. Lexington and Fayette County are completely merged and there are no separate incorporated cities within the county. In both of these counties, while Lexington and Louisville city governments govern their respective counties, a county judge/executive is still elected, as required by Kentucky's Constitution, but does not have substantive powers.

The Federal Information Processing Standard (FIPS) code, which is used by the United States government to uniquely identify counties, is provided with each entry; for Kentucky, the codes start with 21 and are completed with the three digit county code. The FIPS code for each county links to census data for that county.

== Counties ==
County	FIPS code	County seat	Est.	Formed from	Etymology	Population (2025)	Area	Map
Adair County	001	Columbia	April 1, 1802	Green County	John Adair, eighth Governor of Kentucky (1820–24)	19,423	407 sq mi (1,054 km^{2})	State map highlighting Adair County
Allen County	003	Scottsville	April 1, 1815	Barren County and Warren County	John Allen (1771–1813), hero of the Battle of Frenchtown in the War of 1812	22,536	346 sq mi (896 km^{2})	State map highlighting Allen County
Anderson County	005	Lawrenceburg	January 20, 1827	Franklin County, Washington County and Mercer County	Richard Clough Anderson, Jr., Kentucky and United States legislator (1817–21)	25,225	203 sq mi (526 km^{2})	State map highlighting Anderson County
Ballard County	007	Wickliffe	May 23, 1842	Hickman County and McCracken County	Bland Ballard (1761–1853), hero of the Battle of Fallen Timbers and Battle of River Raisin	7,594	251 sq mi (650 km^{2})	State map highlighting Ballard County
Barren County	009	Glasgow	May 10, 1799	Green County and Warren County	The Barrens, a region of grassland in Kentucky	45,641	491 sq mi (1,272 km^{2})	State map highlighting Barren County
Bath County	011	Owingsville	February 4, 1811	Montgomery County	Medicinal springs located within the county	13,176	279 sq mi (723 km^{2})	State map highlighting Bath County
Bell County	013	Pineville	August 1, 1867	Harlan County and Knox County	Joshua Fry Bell, Kentucky legislator (1862–67)	22,829	361 sq mi (935 km^{2})	State map highlighting Bell County
Boone County	015	Burlington	June 1, 1799	Campbell County	Daniel Boone (1734–1820), frontiersman	145,316	246 sq mi (637 km^{2})	State map highlighting Boone County
Bourbon County	017	Paris	May 1, 1786	Fayette County	House of Bourbon, European royal house	20,243	291 sq mi (754 km^{2})	State map highlighting Bourbon County
Boyd County	019	Catlettsburg	May 1, 1860	Greenup County, Carter County and Lawrence County	Linn Boyd, United States Congressman (1835–37; 1839–55) and Lieutenant Governor of Kentucky (1859)	47,751	160 sq mi (414 km^{2})	State map highlighting Boyd County
Boyle County	021	Danville	March 1, 1842	Lincoln County and Mercer County	John Boyle, Chief Justice of the Kentucky Court of Appeals (1810–26)	31,632	182 sq mi (471 km^{2})	State map highlighting Boyle County
Bracken County	023	Brooksville	June 1, 1797	Mason County and Campbell County	William Bracken, trapper and frontiersman	8,511	203 sq mi (526 km^{2})	State map highlighting Bracken County
Breathitt County	025	Jackson	April 1, 1839	Clay County, Perry County and Estill County	John Breathitt, eleventh Governor of Kentucky (1832–34)	12,558	495 sq mi (1,282 km^{2})	State map highlighting Breathitt County
Breckinridge County	027	Hardinsburg	January 1, 1800	Hardin County	John Breckinridge (1760–1806), Kentucky statesman and U.S. Senator	21,503	572 sq mi (1,481 km^{2})	State map highlighting Breckinridge County
Bullitt County	029	Shepherdsville	January 1, 1797	Jefferson County and Nelson County	Alexander Scott Bullitt, Lieutenant Governor of Kentucky (1800–04)	86,454	299 sq mi (774 km^{2})	State map highlighting Bullitt County
Butler County	031	Morgantown	May 1, 1810	Logan County and Ohio County	Richard Butler (1743–91), Revolutionary War general	12,520	428 sq mi (1,109 km^{2})	State map highlighting Butler County
Caldwell County	033	Princeton	May 1, 1809	Livingston County	John Caldwell, Lieutenant Governor of Kentucky (1804)	12,609	347 sq mi (899 km^{2})	State map highlighting Caldwell County
Calloway County	035	Murray	December 19, 1821	Hickman County	Richard Callaway (1724–80), pioneer	39,421	386 sq mi (1,000 km^{2})	State map highlighting Calloway County
Campbell County	037	Alexandria and Newport	May 10, 1795	Harrison County, Mason County and Scott County	John Campbell (1735–99), Revolutionary War colonel	95,441	152 sq mi (394 km^{2})	State map highlighting Campbell County
Carlisle County	039	Bardwell	May 3, 1886	Hickman County	John G. Carlisle, United States legislator (1877–89) and Speaker of the U.S. House of Representatives	4,747	192 sq mi (497 km^{2})	State map highlighting Carlisle County
Carroll County	041	Carrollton	March 1, 1838	Gallatin County, Trimble County, and Henry county	Charles Carroll (1737–1832), last living signer of the Declaration of Independence	11,141	130 sq mi (337 km^{2})	State map highlighting Carroll County
Carter County	043	Grayson	May 1, 1838	Greenup County and Lawrence County	William Grayson Carter, Kentucky state senator (1834–38)	26,149	411 sq mi (1,064 km^{2})	State map highlighting Carter County
Casey County	045	Liberty	May 4, 1807	Lincoln County	William Casey (1754–1816), Revolutionary War colonel	16,205	446 sq mi (1,155 km^{2})	State map highlighting Casey County
Christian County	047	Hopkinsville	March 1, 1797	Logan County	William Christian (1743–86), Revolutionary War soldier and founder of Louisville, Kentucky	70,115	721 sq mi (1,867 km^{2})	State map highlighting Christian County
Clark County	049	Winchester	February 1, 1793	Bourbon County and Fayette County	George Rogers Clark (1752–1818), Revolutionary War general	37,888	254 sq mi (658 km^{2})	State map highlighting Clark County
Clay County	051	Manchester	April 1, 1807	Madison County, Floyd County, and Knox County	Green Clay (1757–1828), Revolutionary War general and western surveyor	19,465	471 sq mi (1,220 km^{2})	State map highlighting Clay County
Clinton County	053	Albany	April 1, 1836	Cumberland County and Wayne County	DeWitt Clinton, Governor of New York (1817–23)	9,139	198 sq mi (513 km^{2})	State map highlighting Clinton County
Crittenden County	055	Marion	April 1, 1842	Livingston County	John Jordan Crittenden, seventeenth Governor of Kentucky (1848–50)	8,807	362 sq mi (938 km^{2})	State map highlighting Crittenden County
Cumberland County	057	Burkesville	July 1, 1799	Green County	The Cumberland River, which flows through the county	5,992	306 sq mi (793 km^{2})	State map highlighting Cumberland County
Daviess County	059	Owensboro	June 1, 1815	Ohio County	Joseph Hamilton Daveiss (1774–1811), lawyer killed at the Battle of Tippecanoe	104,898	462 sq mi (1,197 km^{2})	State map highlighting Daviess County
Edmonson County	061	Brownsville	February 1, 1825	Hart County, Grayson County, and Warren County	John Edmonson (1764–1813), military captain killed at the Battle of Frenchtown	12,749	303 sq mi (785 km^{2})	State map highlighting Edmonson County
Elliott County	063	Sandy Hook	April 1, 1869	Morgan County, Lawrence County, and Carter County	John Milton Elliott (1820–85), U.S. Representative from Kentucky	7,265	234 sq mi (606 km^{2})	State map highlighting Elliott County
Estill County	065	Irvine	April 1, 1808	Clark County and Madison County	James Estill (1750–82), military captain killed at the Battle of Little Mountain	13,962	254 sq mi (658 km^{2})	State map highlighting Estill County
Fayette County	067	Lexington	November 1, 1780	Kentucky County	Gilbert du Motier, marquis de Lafayette (1757–1834), French-born Revolutionary War general	329,751	284 sq mi (736 km^{2})	State map highlighting Fayette County
Fleming County	069	Flemingsburg	March 1, 1798	Mason County	John Fleming (1735–91), frontiersman and one of the county's original settlers	15,787	351 sq mi (909 km^{2})	State map highlighting Fleming County
Floyd County	071	Prestonsburg	June 1, 1800	Fleming County, Montgomery County, and Mason County	John Floyd (1750–83), surveyor and pioneer	34,401	394 sq mi (1,020 km^{2})	State map highlighting Floyd County
Franklin County	073	Frankfort	May 10, 1795	Mercer County, Shelby County, and Woodford County	Benjamin Franklin (1706–90), signer of the Declaration of Independence and U.S. Founding Father	52,649	210 sq mi (544 km^{2})	State map highlighting Franklin County
Fulton County	075	Hickman	April 1, 1845	Hickman County	Robert Fulton (1765–1815), inventor of the first commercially successful steamboat	6,218	209 sq mi (541 km^{2})	State map highlighting Fulton County
Gallatin County	077	Warsaw	May 13, 1799	Franklin County and Shelby County	Albert Gallatin, United States Secretary of the Treasury (1801–14)	8,840	105 sq mi (272 km^{2})	State map highlighting Gallatin County
Garrard County	079	Lancaster	June 1, 1797	Madison County, Lincoln County, and Mercer County	James Garrard, second Governor of Kentucky (1796–1804)	18,207	231 sq mi (598 km^{2})	State map highlighting Garrard County
Grant County	081	Williamstown	April 1, 1820	Pendleton County	Samuel Grant (1762–89 or 94), John Grant (1754–1826), and Squire Grant (1764–1833), three of the county's earliest settlers	26,181	260 sq mi (673 km^{2})	State map highlighting Grant County
Graves County	083	Mayfield	December 19, 1821	Hickman County	Benjamin F. Graves (1771–1813), army major killed at the Battle of Frenchtown	37,050	556 sq mi (1,440 km^{2})	State map highlighting Graves County
Grayson County	085	Leitchfield	April 1, 1810	Hardin County and Ohio County	William Grayson (1740–90), aide to George Washington in the Revolutionary War and U.S. Senator from Virginia	27,406	504 sq mi (1,305 km^{2})	State map highlighting Grayson County
Green County	087	Greensburg	January 1, 1793	Lincoln County and Nelson County	Nathanael Greene (1742–86), Revolutionary War general	11,644	289 sq mi (749 km^{2})	State map highlighting Green County
Greenup County	089	Greenup	February 1, 1804	Mason County	Christopher Greenup, third Governor of Kentucky (1804–08)	35,213	346 sq mi (896 km^{2})	State map highlighting Greenup County
Hancock County	091	Hawesville	March 23, 1829	Ohio County, Breckinridge County, and Daviess County	John Hancock (1737–93), signer of the Declaration of Independence	9,050	189 sq mi (490 km^{2})	State map highlighting Hancock County
Hardin County	093	Elizabethtown	February 20, 1793	Nelson County	John Hardin (1753–92), pioneer	113,482	628 sq mi (1,627 km^{2})	State map highlighting Hardin County
Harlan County	095	Harlan	April 1, 1819	Knox County	Silas Harlan (1753–82), army major in the Battle of Blue Licks	24,725	467 sq mi (1,210 km^{2})	State map highlighting Harlan County
Harrison County	097	Cynthiana	February 1, 1794	Bourbon County and Scott County	Benjamin Harrison (1726–91), co-author of the Kentucky Constitution	19,627	310 sq mi (803 km^{2})	State map highlighting Harrison County
Hart County	099	Munfordville	April 1, 1819	Hardin County and Barren County	Nathaniel G. S. Hart (1784–1813), army major and lawyer captured at the Battle of Frenchtown	20,117	416 sq mi (1,077 km^{2})	State map highlighting Hart County
Henderson County	101	Henderson	May 15, 1799	Christian County	Richard Henderson (1734–85), founder of the Transylvania Company	44,255	440 sq mi (1,140 km^{2})	State map highlighting Henderson County
Henry County	103	New Castle	June 1, 1799	Shelby County	Patrick Henry (1736–99), Revolutionary War-era legislator and U.S. founding father	16,447	289 sq mi (749 km^{2})	State map highlighting Henry County
Hickman County	105	Clinton	December 19, 1821	Christian County	Paschal Hickman, military captain killed at the Battle of Frenchtown	4,372	244 sq mi (632 km^{2})	State map highlighting Hickman County
Hopkins County	107	Madisonville	May 1, 1807	Henderson County	Samuel Hopkins (1753–1819), Revolutionary War general	45,127	551 sq mi (1,427 km^{2})	State map highlighting Hopkins County
Jackson County	109	McKee	April 25, 1858	Madison County, Estill County, Owsley County, Clay County, Laurel County, and Rockcastle County	Andrew Jackson, President of the United States (1829–37)	13,325	346 sq mi (896 km^{2})	State map highlighting Jackson County
Jefferson County	111	Louisville	November 1, 1780	Kentucky County	Thomas Jefferson, President of the United States (1801–09)	795,222	385 sq mi (997 km^{2})	State map highlighting Jefferson County
Jessamine County	113	Nicholasville	February 1, 1799	Fayette County	Jessamine Creek, which contains a set of rapids that are the county's most well known natural feature	57,147	173 sq mi (448 km^{2})	State map highlighting Jessamine County
Johnson County	115	Paintsville	April 1, 1843	Floyd County, Lawrence County, and Morgan County	Richard Mentor Johnson, Vice President of the United States (1837–41)	22,051	262 sq mi (679 km^{2})	State map highlighting Johnson County
Kenton County	117	Covington and Independence	April 30, 1840	Campbell County	Simon Kenton (1755–1836), pioneer	175,779	163 sq mi (422 km^{2})	State map highlighting Kenton County
Knott County	119	Hindman	May 15, 1884	Perry County, Letcher County, Floyd County, and Breathitt County	James Proctor Knott, twenty-ninth Governor of Kentucky (1883–87)	13,321	352 sq mi (912 km^{2})	State map highlighting Knott County
Knox County	121	Barbourville	June 2, 1800	Lincoln County	Henry Knox, United States Secretary of War (1785–94)	29,532	388 sq mi (1,005 km^{2})	State map highlighting Knox County
LaRue County	123	Hodgenville	March 1, 1843	Hardin County	John LaRue (1746–92), one of the county's original settlers and the grandfather of Governor John L. Helm	15,184	263 sq mi (681 km^{2})	State map highlighting LaRue County
Laurel County	125	London	February 13, 1826	Rockcastle County, Clay County, Knox County and Whitley County	Mountain laurel trees that are prominent in the area	63,746	436 sq mi (1,129 km^{2})	State map highlighting Laurel County
Lawrence County	127	Louisa	February 11, 1822	Greenup County and Floyd County	James Lawrence (1781–1813), naval commander during the War of 1812	15,765	419 sq mi (1,085 km^{2})	State map highlighting Lawrence County
Lee County	129	Beattyville	March 1, 1870	Breathitt County, Estill County, Owsley County, and Wolfe County	Robert E. Lee (1807–1870), a confederate general during the Civil War	7,297	210 sq mi (544 km^{2})	State map highlighting Lee County
Leslie County	131	Hyden	April 15, 1878	Clay County, Harlan County and Perry County	Preston Leslie, twenty-sixth Governor of Kentucky (1871–75)	9,627	404 sq mi (1,046 km^{2})	State map highlighting Leslie County
Letcher County	133	Whitesburg	April 1, 1842	Perry County and Harlan County	Robert P. Letcher, fifteenth Governor of Kentucky (1840–44)	19,952	339 sq mi (878 km^{2})	State map highlighting Letcher County
Lewis County	135	Vanceburg	April 1, 1807	Mason County	Meriwether Lewis (1774–1809), explorer	12,901	484 sq mi (1,254 km^{2})	State map highlighting Lewis County
Lincoln County	137	Stanford	November 1, 1780	Kentucky County	Benjamin Lincoln (1733–1810), Revolutionary War general	25,353	337 sq mi (873 km^{2})	State map highlighting Lincoln County
Livingston County	139	Smithland	May 21, 1799	Christian County	Robert Livingston (1746–1813), one of the Committee of Five that drafted the Declaration of Independence	8,863	316 sq mi (818 km^{2})	State map highlighting Livingston County
Logan County	141	Russellville	September 1, 1792	Lincoln County	Benjamin Logan (1742–1802), Revolutionary War general	28,669	556 sq mi (1,440 km^{2})	State map highlighting Logan County
Lyon County	143	Eddyville	April 1, 1854	Caldwell County	Chittenden Lyon, United States Representative from Kentucky (1827–35)	9,123	216 sq mi (559 km^{2})	State map highlighting Lyon County
McCracken County	145	Paducah	December 19, 1821	Hickman County	Virgil McCracken, military captain killed at the Battle of Frenchtown	67,553	251 sq mi (650 km^{2})	State map highlighting McCracken County
McCreary County	147	Whitley City	March 12, 1912	Pulaski County, Wayne County, Whitley County	James McCreary, thirty-seventh Governor of Kentucky (1912–16)	17,124	428 sq mi (1,109 km^{2})	State map highlighting McCreary County
McLean County	149	Calhoun	May 8, 1854	Daviess County, Muhlenberg County and Ohio County	Alney McLean (1815–17; 1819–21), United States Representative from Kentucky	9,064	254 sq mi (658 km^{2})	State map highlighting McLean County
Madison County	151	Richmond	August 1, 1786	Lincoln County	James Madison, President of the United States (1809–17)	101,698	441 sq mi (1,142 km^{2})	State map highlighting Madison County
Magoffin County	153	Salyersville	April 25, 1860	Floyd County, Johnson County and Morgan County	Beriah Magoffin, twenty-first Governor of Kentucky (1859–62)	11,110	310 sq mi (803 km^{2})	State map highlighting Magoffin County
Marion County	155	Lebanon	March 1, 1834	Washington County	Francis Marion (1732–95), Revolutionary War general	20,115	347 sq mi (899 km^{2})	State map highlighting Marion County
Marshall County	157	Benton	June 1, 1842	Calloway County	John Marshall, Chief Justice of the United States Supreme Court (1801–35)	31,659	305 sq mi (790 km^{2})	State map highlighting Marshall County
Martin County	159	Inez	September 1, 1870	Floyd County, Johnson County, Pike County, and Lawrence County	John P. Martin, United States Congressman from Kentucky (1845–47)	10,697	231 sq mi (598 km^{2})	State map highlighting Martin County
Mason County	161	Maysville	May 1, 1789	Bourbon County	George Mason (1725–92), statesman known as the "Father of the Bill of Rights"	16,936	241 sq mi (624 km^{2})	State map highlighting Mason County
Meade County	163	Brandenburg	March 22, 1824	Breckinridge County and Hardin County	James M. Meade, military captain killed at the Battle of Frenchtown	30,699	308 sq mi (798 km^{2})	State map highlighting Meade County
Menifee County	165	Frenchburg	May 1, 1869	Bath County, Montgomery County, Morgan County, Powell County and Wolfe County	Richard H. Menefee, United States Congressman from Kentucky (1837–39)	6,430	204 sq mi (528 km^{2})	State map highlighting Menifee County
Mercer County	167	Harrodsburg	August 1, 1786	Lincoln County	Hugh Mercer (1726–77), Revolutionary War hero who was killed at the Battle of Princeton	23,733	251 sq mi (650 km^{2})	State map highlighting Mercer County
Metcalfe County	169	Edmonton	May 7, 1860	Barren County, Hart County, Green County, Adair County, Cumberland County and Monroe County	Thomas Metcalfe, tenth Governor of Kentucky (1828–32)	10,583	291 sq mi (754 km^{2})	State map highlighting Metcalfe County
Monroe County	171	Tompkinsville	April 1, 1820	Barren County and Cumberland County	James Monroe, President of the United States (1817–25)	11,191	331 sq mi (857 km^{2})	State map highlighting Monroe County
Montgomery County	173	Mount Sterling	March 1, 1797	Clark County	Richard Montgomery (1736–75), military general killed at the Battle of Quebec	28,822	199 sq mi (515 km^{2})	State map highlighting Montgomery County
Morgan County	175	West Liberty	March 10, 1823	Bath County and Floyd County	Daniel Morgan (1736–1802), Revolutionary War general	14,415	381 sq mi (987 km^{2})	State map highlighting Morgan County
Muhlenberg County	177	Greenville	May 15, 1799	Christian County and Logan County	Peter Muhlenberg (1746–1807), Revolutionary War general	30,634	475 sq mi (1,230 km^{2})	State map highlighting Muhlenberg County
Nelson County	179	Bardstown	January 1, 1785	Jefferson County	Thomas Nelson, Jr. (1738–89), signer of the Declaration of Independence	49,036	423 sq mi (1,096 km^{2})	State map highlighting Nelson County
Nicholas County	181	Carlisle	June 1, 1800	Mason County and Bourbon County	George Nicholas (1743–99), Revolutionary War colonel	7,949	197 sq mi (510 km^{2})	State map highlighting Nicholas County
Ohio County	183	Hartford	July 1, 1799	Hardin County	The Ohio River, which formed the county's northern border until the creation of Daviess and Hancock counties	23,934	594 sq mi (1,538 km^{2})	State map highlighting Ohio County
Oldham County	185	La Grange	February 1, 1824	Henry County, Jefferson County and Shelby County	William Oldham (1753–91), Revolutionary War colonel	70,986	189 sq mi (490 km^{2})	State map highlighting Oldham County
Owen County	187	Owenton	April 1, 1819	Franklin County, Gallatin County and Scott County	Abraham Owen (1769–1811), killed at the Battle of Tippecanoe	11,601	352 sq mi (912 km^{2})	State map highlighting Owen County
Owsley County	189	Booneville	June 1, 1843	Breathitt County, Clay County, and Estill County	William Owsley, Kentucky Secretary of State and later Governor of Kentucky (1844–48)	3,932	198 sq mi (513 km^{2})	State map highlighting Owsley County
Pendleton County	191	Falmouth	May 10, 1799	Campbell County and Bracken County	Edmund Pendleton (1721–1803), member of the Continental Congress	14,800	280 sq mi (725 km^{2})	State map highlighting Pendleton County
Perry County	193	Hazard	February 26, 1821	Floyd County and Clay County	Oliver Hazard Perry (1785–1819), Admiral in the War of 1812	26,555	342 sq mi (886 km^{2})	State map highlighting Perry County
Pike County	195	Pikeville	March 1, 1822	Floyd County	Zebulon Pike (1779–1813), western explorer and discoverer of Pike's Peak	54,721	788 sq mi (2,041 km^{2})	State map highlighting Pike County
Powell County	197	Stanton	May 10, 1852	Clark County, Estill County, and Montgomery County	Lazarus Whitehead Powell, nineteenth Governor of Kentucky (1851–55)	12,812	180 sq mi (466 km^{2})	State map highlighting Powell County
Pulaski County	199	Somerset	June 1, 1799	Green County and Lincoln County	Casimir Pulaski (1746–79), Polish-born Revolutionary War soldier killed at the Battle of Savannah	67,384	662 sq mi (1,715 km^{2})	State map highlighting Pulaski County
Robertson County	201	Mount Olivet	August 1, 1867	Bracken County, Harrison County, Mason County, and Nicholas County	George Robertson, chief justice of the Kentucky court of appeals (1828–43)	2,325	100 sq mi (259 km^{2})	State map highlighting Robertson County
Rockcastle County	203	Mount Vernon	April 1, 1810	Lincoln County, Madison County, Knox County and Pulaski County	Rockcastle River, the boundary between Rockcastle and Laurel County	16,148	318 sq mi (824 km^{2})	State map highlighting Rockcastle County
Rowan County	205	Morehead	May 1, 1856	Fleming County and Morgan County	John Rowan, Congressman from Kentucky (1809–11; 1825–31))	24,476	281 sq mi (728 km^{2})	State map highlighting Rowan County
Russell County	207	Jamestown	April 1, 1826	Adair County, Wayne County and Cumberland County	William Russell (1758–1825), pioneer and state legislator	18,608	254 sq mi (658 km^{2})	State map highlighting Russell County
Scott County	209	Georgetown	September 1, 1792	Woodford County	Charles Scott (Governor of Kentucky), Revolutionary war general and later Governor of Kentucky (1808–12)	62,262	285 sq mi (738 km^{2})	State map highlighting Scott County
Shelby County	211	Shelbyville	September 1, 1792	Jefferson County	Isaac Shelby, first Governor of Kentucky (1792–96; 1812–16)	51,243	384 sq mi (995 km^{2})	State map highlighting Shelby County
Simpson County	213	Franklin	April 1, 1819	Allen County, Logan County and Warren County	John Simpson, military captain killed at the Battle of Frenchtown	20,788	236 sq mi (611 km^{2})	State map highlighting Simpson County
Spencer County	215	Taylorsville	January 15, 1824	Nelson County, Shelby County, and Bullitt County	Spier Spencer, military captain killed at the Battle of Tippecanoe	20,998	186 sq mi (482 km^{2})	State map highlighting Spencer County
Taylor County	217	Campbellsville	March 1, 1848	Green County	Zachary Taylor, President of the United States (1849–50)	26,763	270 sq mi (699 km^{2})	State map highlighting Taylor County
Todd County	219	Elkton	April 1, 1820	Logan County and Christian County	John Todd (1750–82), military colonel killed at the Battle of Blue Licks	12,972	376 sq mi (974 km^{2})	State map highlighting Todd County
Trigg County	221	Cadiz	April 1, 1820	Christian County and Caldwell County	Stephen Trigg (1744–82), military colonel killed at the Battle of Blue Licks	14,512	443 sq mi (1,147 km^{2})	State map highlighting Trigg County
Trimble County	223	Bedford	March 1, 1837	Gallatin County, Henry County and Oldham County	Robert Trimble, Associate Supreme Court Justice (1826–28)	8,701	149 sq mi (386 km^{2})	State map highlighting Trimble County
Union County	225	Morganfield	May 1, 1811	Henderson County	Unanimous decision of the residents to unite together and create a new county	12,839	345 sq mi (894 km^{2})	State map highlighting Union County
Warren County	227	Bowling Green	March 1, 1797	Logan County	Joseph Warren (1741–75), Revolutionary War general	149,375	545 sq mi (1,412 km^{2})	State map highlighting Warren County
Washington County	229	Springfield	September 1, 1792	Jefferson County	George Washington, President of the United States (1789–97)	12,368	301 sq mi (780 km^{2})	State map highlighting Washington County
Wayne County	231	Monticello	March 1, 1801	Pulaski County and Cumberland County	Anthony Wayne (1745–96), Revolutionary War general	19,597	459 sq mi (1,189 km^{2})	State map highlighting Wayne County
Webster County	233	Dixon	July 1, 1860	Henderson County, Hopkins County, and Union County	Daniel Webster, U.S. Senator from Massachusetts and United States Secretary of State (1841–43; 1850–52)	12,929	335 sq mi (868 km^{2})	State map highlighting Webster County
Whitley County	235	Williamsburg	April 1, 1818	Knox County	William Whitley (1749–1813), Kentucky pioneer	37,297	440 sq mi (1,140 km^{2})	State map highlighting Whitley County
Wolfe County	237	Campton	July 1, 1860	Breathitt County, Owsley County, and Powell County	Nathaniel Wolfe (1808–65), member of the Kentucky General Assembly	6,298	223 sq mi (578 km^{2})	State map highlighting Wolfe County
Woodford County	239	Versailles	May 1, 1789	Fayette County	William Woodford (1734–80), Revolutionary War general	27,883	191 sq mi (495 km^{2})	State map highlighting Woodford County

== Racial / Ethnic Profile of counties in Kentucky (2020 Census) ==
Racial / Ethnic Profile of counties in Kentucky (2020 Census)
Following is a table of counties in Kentucky by race/ethnicity. The majority racial/ethnic group is coded per the key below.

Majority minority with no dominant group
Majority White
Majority Black
Majority Hispanic
Majority Asian
Majority Native American

Racial and ethnic composition of counties in Kentucky (2020 Census) (NH = Non-Hispanic) Note: the US Census treats Hispanic/Latino as an ethnic category. This table excludes Latinos from the racial categories and assigns them to a separate category. Hispanics/Latinos may be of any race.
County	Location of County	Total Population	White alone (NH)	%	Black or African American alone (NH)	%	Native American or Alaska Native alone (NH)	%	Asian alone (NH)	%	Pacific Islander alone (NH)	%	Other race alone (NH)	%	Mixed race or Multiracial (NH)	%	Hispanic or Latino (any race)	%
Adair		18,903	17,044	90.17%	498	2.63%	26	0.14%	63	0.33%	6	0.03%	70	0.37%	553	2.93%	643	3.40%
Allen		20,588	18,987	92.22%	204	0.99%	38	0.18%	48	0.23%	7	0.03%	41	0.20%	689	3.35%	574	2.79%
Anderson		23,852	21,654	90.78%	482	2.02%	50	0.21%	104	0.44%	4	0.02%	68	0.29%	969	4.06%	521	2.18%
Ballard		7,728	7,074	91.54%	208	2.69%	7	0.09%	29	0.38%	0	0.00%	5	0.06%	312	4.04%	93	1.20%
Barren		44,485	38,804	87.23%	1,697	3.81%	73	0.16%	255	0.57%	53	0.12%	160	0.36%	1,554	3.49%	1,889	4.25%
Bath		12,750	12,125	95.10%	127	1.00%	4	0.03%	16	0.13%	1	0.01%	15	0.12%	280	2.20%	182	1.43%
Bell		24,097	22,311	92.59%	552	2.29%	32	0.13%	122	0.51%	4	0.02%	58	0.24%	774	3.21%	244	1.01%
Boone		135,968	112,602	82.81%	5,609	4.13%	194	0.14%	3,048	2.24%	307	0.23%	465	0.34%	6,036	4.44%	7,707	5.67%
Bourbon		20,252	16,770	82.81%	1,033	5.10%	28	0.14%	77	0.38%	8	0.04%	70	0.35%	780	3.85%	1,486	7.34%
Boyd		48,261	44,035	91.24%	1,306	2.71%	89	0.18%	277	0.57%	6	0.01%	116	0.24%	1,718	3.56%	714	1.48%
Boyle		30,614	25,074	81.90%	2,155	7.04%	38	0.12%	361	1.18%	3	0.01%	97	0.32%	1,396	4.56%	1,490	4.87%
Bracken		8,400	7,964	94.81%	48	0.57%	14	0.17%	13	0.15%	0	0.00%	6	0.07%	265	3.15%	90	1.07%
Breathitt		13,718	13,038	95.04%	57	0.42%	11	0.08%	37	0.27%	11	0.08%	0	0.00%	471	3.43%	93	0.68%
Breckinridge		20,432	18,743	91.73%	422	2.07%	43	0.21%	38	0.19%	3	0.01%	64	0.31%	835	4.09%	284	1.39%
Bullitt		82,217	74,787	90.96%	1,031	1.25%	177	0.22%	445	0.54%	23	0.03%	172	0.21%	3,465	4.21%	2,117	2.57%
Butler		12,371	11,370	91.91%	15	0.12%	22	0.18%	21	0.17%	3	0.02%	23	0.19%	325	2.63%	592	4.79%
Caldwell		12,649	11,190	88.47%	654	5.17%	21	0.17%	53	0.42%	2	0.02%	29	0.23%	502	3.97%	198	1.57%
Calloway		37,103	32,235	86.88%	1,293	3.49%	53	0.14%	433	1.17%	11	0.03%	110	0.30%	1,615	4.35%	1,353	3.65%
Campbell		93,076	82,743	88.90%	2,796	3.00%	117	0.13%	1,024	1.10%	30	0.03%	370	0.40%	3,687	3.96%	2,309	2.48%
Carlisle		4,826	4,443	92.06%	59	1.22%	27	0.56%	10	0.21%	0	0.00%	0	0.00%	154	3.19%	133	2.76%
Carroll		10,810	9,401	86.97%	169	1.56%	20	0.19%	44	0.41%	3	0.03%	11	0.10%	367	3.39%	795	7.35%
Carter		26,627	25,425	95.49%	209	0.78%	45	0.17%	58	0.22%	1	0.00%	31	0.12%	604	2.27%	254	0.95%
Casey		15,941	14,836	93.07%	81	0.51%	42	0.26%	52	0.33%	1	0.01%	40	0.25%	350	2.20%	539	3.38%
Christian		72,748	46,400	63.78%	15,221	20.92%	272	0.37%	939	1.29%	211	0.29%	280	0.38%	3,673	5.05%	5,752	7.91%
Clark		36,972	32,267	87.27%	1,635	4.42%	63	0.17%	209	0.57%	14	0.04%	79	0.21%	1,228	3.32%	1,477	3.99%
Clay		20,345	18,686	91.85%	816	4.01%	26	0.13%	21	0.10%	11	0.05%	21	0.10%	411	2.02%	353	1.73%
Clinton		9,253	8,680	93.81%	39	0.42%	10	0.11%	10	0.11%	3	0.03%	15	0.16%	251	2.71%	245	2.65%
Crittenden		8,990	8,524	94.82%	82	0.91%	15	0.17%	5	0.06%	5	0.06%	17	0.19%	229	2.55%	113	1.26%
Cumberland		5,888	5,445	92.48%	150	2.55%	1	0.02%	2	0.03%	6	0.10%	6	0.10%	201	3.41%	77	1.31%
Daviess		103,312	87,327	84.53%	4,827	4.67%	130	0.13%	2,417	2.34%	59	0.06%	311	0.30%	4,096	3.96%	4,145	4.01%
Edmonson		12,126	11,486	94.72%	98	0.81%	31	0.26%	32	0.26%	7	0.06%	7	0.06%	309	2.55%	156	1.29%
Elliott		7,354	6,875	93.49%	246	3.35%	14	0.19%	10	0.14%	0	0.00%	15	0.20%	103	1.40%	91	1.24%
Estill		14,163	13,619	96.16%	30	0.21%	23	0.16%	7	0.05%	0	0.00%	11	0.08%	342	2.41%	131	0.92%
Fayette		322,570	215,343	66.76%	47,501	14.73%	480	0.15%	13,374	4.15%	133	0.04%	1,667	0.52%	14,322	4.44%	29,750	9.22%
Fleming		15,082	14,314	94.91%	148	0.98%	22	0.15%	17	0.11%	3	0.02%	42	0.28%	318	2.11%	218	1.45%
Floyd		35,942	34,654	96.42%	121	0.34%	28	0.08%	96	0.27%	1	0.00%	34	0.09%	700	1.95%	308	0.86%
Franklin		51,541	41,282	80.10%	4,444	8.62%	91	0.18%	1,031	2.00%	14	0.03%	212	0.41%	2,420	4.70%	2,047	3.97%
Fulton		6,515	4,566	70.08%	1,433	22.00%	13	0.20%	17	0.26%	11	0.17%	27	0.41%	297	4.56%	151	2.32%
Gallatin		8,690	7,762	89.32%	74	0.85%	4	0.05%	13	0.15%	7	0.08%	11	0.13%	327	3.76%	492	5.66%
Garrard		16,953	15,433	91.03%	301	1.78%	27	0.16%	51	0.30%	8	0.05%	37	0.22%	645	3.80%	451	2.66%
Grant		24,941	22,823	91.51%	179	0.72%	51	0.20%	66	0.26%	33	0.13%	56	0.22%	992	3.98%	741	2.97%
Graves		36,649	30,527	83.30%	1,551	4.23%	96	0.26%	173	0.47%	3	0.01%	76	0.21%	1,450	3.96%	2,773	7.57%
Grayson		26,420	24,756	93.70%	308	1.17%	71	0.27%	96	0.36%	2	0.01%	75	0.28%	748	2.83%	364	1.38%
Green		11,107	10,361	93.28%	160	1.44%	17	0.15%	28	0.25%	2	0.02%	28	0.25%	312	2.81%	199	1.79%
Greenup		35,962	33,974	94.47%	219	0.61%	68	0.19%	230	0.64%	5	0.01%	83	0.23%	1,066	2.96%	317	0.88%
Hancock		9,095	8,586	94.40%	79	0.87%	4	0.04%	34	0.37%	0	0.00%	14	0.15%	216	2.38%	162	1.78%
Hardin		110,702	81,085	73.25%	12,510	11.30%	378	0.34%	2,243	2.03%	400	0.36%	597	0.54%	6,794	6.14%	6,695	6.05%
Harlan		26,831	25,001	93.18%	541	2.02%	54	0.20%	85	0.32%	0	0.00%	48	0.18%	837	3.12%	265	0.99%
Harrison		18,692	17,216	92.10%	307	1.64%	26	0.14%	46	0.25%	1	0.01%	47	0.25%	662	3.54%	387	2.07%
Hart		19,288	17,492	90.69%	705	3.66%	33	0.17%	45	0.23%	6	0.03%	30	0.16%	643	3.33%	334	1.73%
Henderson		44,793	37,323	83.32%	3,632	8.11%	78	0.17%	239	0.53%	41	0.09%	167	0.37%	1,945	4.34%	1,368	3.05%
Henry		15,678	14,065	89.71%	349	2.23%	45	0.29%	35	0.22%	0	0.00%	45	0.29%	594	3.79%	545	3.48%
Hickman		4,521	3,866	85.51%	380	8.41%	6	0.13%	11	0.24%	0	0.00%	1	0.02%	155	3.43%	102	2.26%
Hopkins		45,423	39,054	85.98%	2,902	6.39%	70	0.15%	230	0.51%	29	0.06%	119	0.26%	1,893	4.17%	1,126	2.48%
Jackson		12,955	12,509	96.56%	12	0.09%	36	0.28%	19	0.15%	4	0.03%	11	0.08%	268	2.07%	96	0.74%
Jefferson		782,969	490,251	62.61%	167,067	21.34%	1,441	0.18%	26,944	3.44%	559	0.07%	3,707	0.47%	33,979	4.34%	59,021	7.54%
Jessamine		52,991	45,191	85.28%	2,247	4.24%	106	0.20%	658	1.24%	27	0.05%	173	0.33%	2,205	4.16%	2,384	4.50%
Johnson		22,680	21,860	96.38%	42	0.19%	39	0.17%	101	0.45%	4	0.02%	16	0.07%	420	1.85%	198	0.87%
Kenton		169,064	142,167	84.09%	8,061	4.77%	234	0.14%	2,015	1.19%	241	0.14%	549	0.32%	8,056	4.77%	7,741	4.58%
Knott		14,251	13,813	96.93%	65	0.46%	8	0.06%	18	0.13%	0	0.00%	7	0.05%	250	1.75%	90	0.63%
Knox		30,193	28,509	94.42%	281	0.93%	82	0.27%	85	0.28%	1	0.00%	34	0.11%	854	2.83%	347	1.15%
Larue		14,867	13,299	89.45%	377	2.54%	47	0.32%	29	0.20%	15	0.10%	47	0.32%	574	3.86%	479	3.22%
Laurel		62,613	58,503	93.44%	440	0.70%	143	0.23%	426	0.68%	4	0.01%	97	0.15%	1,989	3.18%	1,011	1.61%
Lawrence		16,293	15,721	96.49%	36	0.22%	2	0.01%	23	0.14%	4	0.02%	25	0.15%	334	2.05%	148	0.91%
Lee		7,395	6,887	93.13%	280	3.79%	1	0.01%	0	0.00%	0	0.00%	19	0.26%	148	2.00%	60	0.81%
Leslie		10,513	10,170	96.74%	39	0.37%	15	0.14%	15	0.14%	0	0.00%	4	0.04%	198	1.88%	72	0.68%
Letcher		21,548	20,773	96.40%	87	0.40%	30	0.14%	57	0.26%	0	0.00%	27	0.13%	441	2.05%	133	0.62%
Lewis		13,080	12,599	96.32%	36	0.28%	18	0.14%	9	0.07%	4	0.03%	6	0.05%	325	2.48%	83	0.63%
Lincoln		24,275	22,493	92.66%	459	1.89%	33	0.14%	60	0.25%	2	0.01%	46	0.19%	707	2.91%	475	1.96%
Livingston		8,888	8,232	92.62%	25	0.28%	19	0.21%	12	0.14%	6	0.07%	14	0.16%	394	4.43%	186	2.09%
Logan		27,432	23,681	86.33%	1,680	6.12%	43	0.16%	95	0.35%	2	0.01%	92	0.34%	986	3.59%	853	3.11%
Lyon		8,680	7,733	89.09%	507	5.84%	25	0.29%	34	0.39%	0	0.00%	21	0.24%	208	2.40%	152	1.75%
McCracken		67,875	53,801	79.27%	7,539	11.11%	170	0.25%	660	0.97%	18	0.03%	223	0.33%	3,329	4.91%	2,135	3.15%
McCreary		16,888	15,072	89.25%	908	5.38%	58	0.34%	32	0.19%	3	0.02%	17	0.10%	433	2.56%	365	2.16%
McLean		9,152	8,691	94.96%	47	0.51%	10	0.11%	13	0.14%	2	0.02%	28	0.31%	197	2.15%	164	1.79%
Madison		92,701	79,591	85.86%	3,880	4.19%	190	0.20%	1,006	1.09%	56	0.06%	260	0.28%	4,654	5.02%	3,064	3.30%
Magoffin		11,637	11,335	97.41%	14	0.12%	14	0.12%	5	0.04%	6	0.05%	13	0.11%	184	1.58%	66	0.57%
Marion		19,581	16,779	85.69%	1,209	6.17%	0	0.00%	123	0.63%	47	0.24%	53	0.27%	689	3.52%	681	3.48%
Marshall		31,659	29,697	93.80%	101	0.32%	60	0.19%	129	0.41%	9	0.03%	45	0.14%	1,079	3.41%	539	1.70%
Martin		11,287	10,002	88.62%	780	6.91%	42	0.37%	17	0.15%	1	0.01%	1	0.01%	154	1.36%	290	2.57%
Mason		17,120	14,777	86.31%	1,017	5.94%	29	0.17%	107	0.63%	0	0.00%	43	0.25%	791	4.62%	356	2.08%
Meade		30,003	25,912	86.36%	952	3.17%	132	0.44%	217	0.72%	73	0.24%	121	0.40%	1,463	4.88%	1,133	3.78%
Menifee		6,113	5,873	96.07%	30	0.49%	12	0.20%	2	0.03%	2	0.03%	1	0.02%	136	2.22%	57	0.93%
Mercer		22,641	20,100	88.78%	748	3.30%	40	0.18%	74	0.33%	14	0.06%	82	0.36%	880	3.89%	703	3.11%
Metcalfe		10,286	9,620	93.52%	114	1.11%	3	0.03%	7	0.07%	0	0.00%	33	0.32%	279	2.71%	230	2.24%
Monroe		11,338	10,389	91.63%	218	1.92%	9	0.08%	10	0.09%	0	0.00%	25	0.22%	214	1.89%	473	4.17%
Montgomery		28,114	25,363	90.21%	614	2.18%	26	0.09%	145	0.52%	1	0.00%	65	0.23%	975	3.47%	925	3.29%
Morgan		13,726	12,510	91.14%	492	3.58%	20	0.15%	17	0.12%	4	0.03%	10	0.07%	256	1.86%	417	3.04%
Muhlenberg		30,928	28,204	91.19%	1,203	3.89%	64	0.21%	58	0.19%	3	0.01%	62	0.20%	765	2.47%	569	1.84%
Nelson		46,738	41,113	87.96%	2,183	4.67%	62	0.13%	267	0.57%	8	0.02%	125	0.27%	1,766	3.78%	1,214	2.60%
Nicholas		7,537	7,124	94.52%	41	0.54%	10	0.13%	7	0.09%	2	0.03%	14	0.19%	185	2.45%	154	2.04%
Ohio		23,772	21,872	92.01%	155	0.65%	26	0.11%	45	0.19%	2	0.01%	54	0.23%	625	2.63%	993	4.18%
Oldham		67,607	57,836	85.55%	2,198	3.25%	108	0.16%	1,160	1.72%	17	0.03%	214	0.32%	2,839	4.20%	3,235	4.79%
Owen		11,278	10,486	92.98%	83	0.74%	22	0.20%	18	0.16%	4	0.04%	17	0.15%	397	3.52%	251	2.23%
Owsley		4,051	3,905	96.40%	11	0.27%	1	0.02%	1	0.02%	5	0.12%	4	0.10%	82	2.02%	42	1.04%
Pendleton		14,644	13,833	94.46%	56	0.38%	21	0.14%	30	0.20%	3	0.02%	42	0.29%	458	3.13%	201	1.37%
Perry		28,473	26,748	93.94%	374	1.31%	51	0.18%	255	0.90%	1	0.00%	29	0.10%	794	2.79%	221	0.78%
Pike		58,669	55,635	94.83%	485	0.83%	68	0.12%	369	0.63%	11	0.02%	92	0.16%	1,314	2.24%	695	1.18%
Powell		13,129	12,507	95.26%	64	0.49%	17	0.13%	30	0.23%	0	0.00%	23	0.18%	291	2.22%	197	1.50%
Pulaski		65,034	59,600	91.64%	677	1.04%	160	0.25%	436	0.67%	10	0.02%	150	0.23%	2,124	3.27%	1,877	2.89%
Robertson		2,193	2,106	96.03%	6	0.27%	3	0.14%	7	0.32%	0	0.00%	0	0.00%	52	2.37%	19	0.87%
Rockcastle		16,037	15,316	95.50%	52	0.32%	33	0.21%	28	0.17%	0	0.00%	24	0.15%	412	2.57%	172	1.07%
Rowan		24,662	22,773	92.34%	372	1.51%	32	0.13%	157	0.64%	5	0.02%	105	0.43%	677	2.75%	541	2.19%
Russell		17,991	16,497	91.70%	113	0.63%	58	0.32%	104	0.58%	3	0.02%	23	0.13%	412	2.29%	781	4.34%
Scott		57,155	47,704	83.46%	2,907	5.09%	56	0.10%	587	1.03%	19	0.03%	185	0.32%	2,594	4.54%	3,103	5.43%
Shelby		48,065	37,363	77.73%	2,700	5.62%	76	0.16%	361	0.75%	22	0.05%	212	0.44%	2,036	4.24%	5,295	11.02%
Simpson		19,594	16,201	82.68%	1,622	8.28%	58	0.30%	94	0.48%	5	0.03%	72	0.37%	894	4.56%	648	3.31%
Spencer		19,490	17,764	91.14%	297	1.52%	32	0.16%	90	0.46%	12	0.06%	30	0.15%	815	4.18%	450	2.31%
Taylor		26,023	22,724	87.32%	1,252	4.81%	26	0.10%	244	0.94%	10	0.04%	110	0.42%	937	3.60%	720	2.77%
Todd		12,243	10,234	83.59%	880	7.19%	14	0.11%	22	0.18%	6	0.05%	41	0.33%	448	3.66%	598	4.88%
Trigg		14,061	12,202	86.78%	950	6.76%	34	0.24%	27	0.19%	6	0.04%	34	0.24%	491	3.49%	317	2.25%
Trimble		8,474	7,914	93.39%	28	0.33%	29	0.34%	27	0.32%	4	0.05%	8	0.09%	272	3.21%	192	2.27%
Union		13,668	11,802	86.35%	1,029	7.53%	27	0.20%	32	0.23%	1	0.01%	39	0.29%	550	4.02%	188	1.38%
Warren		134,554	97,744	72.64%	12,804	9.52%	235	0.17%	7,295	5.42%	661	0.49%	630	0.47%	5,744	4.27%	9,441	7.02%
Washington		12,027	10,397	86.45%	652	5.42%	25	0.21%	38	0.32%	5	0.04%	52	0.43%	388	3.23%	470	3.91%
Wayne		19,555	17,872	91.39%	228	1.17%	28	0.14%	60	0.31%	5	0.03%	17	0.09%	443	2.27%	902	4.61%
Webster		13,017	11,145	85.62%	476	3.66%	23	0.18%	24	0.18%	1	0.01%	43	0.33%	460	3.53%	845	6.49%
Whitley		36,712	34,076	92.82%	531	1.45%	89	0.24%	204	0.56%	10	0.03%	50	0.14%	1,065	2.90%	687	1.87%
Wolfe		6,562	6,356	96.86%	27	0.41%	9	0.14%	5	0.08%	0	0.00%	15	0.23%	89	1.36%	61	0.93%
Woodford		26,871	22,361	83.22%	1,211	4.51%	28	0.10%	157	0.58%	10	0.04%	76	0.28%	1,015	3.78%	2,013	7.49%

== Clickable map ==
The map shown below is clickable; click on any county to be redirected to the page for that county, or use the text links shown above on this page.

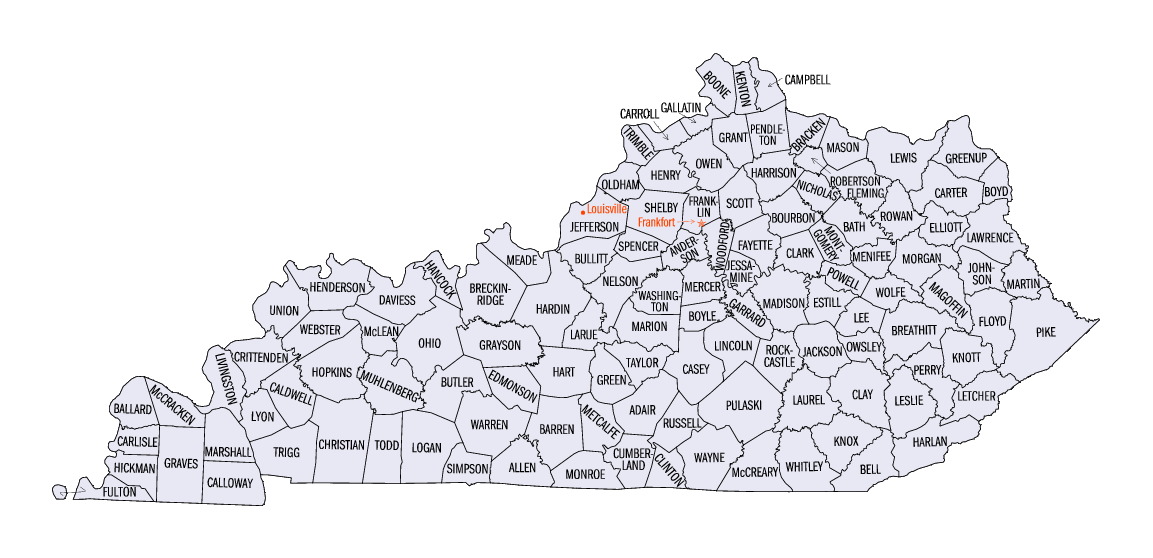
Map of Kentucky's counties

== See also ==
- List of United States counties and county equivalents
- Lists of U.S. county name etymologies
- List of cities in Kentucky
