= Kentucky Route 467 =

State highway in Kentucky, United States

Kentucky Route 467
- KY 467 highlighted in red

Route information
- Maintained by KYTC
- Length: 48.380 mi (77.860 km)

Major junctions
- West end: KY 227 near Worthville
- KY 36 at Eagle Station; KY 36 / KY 47 in Sanders; KY 35 in Sparta; US 127 in Glencoe; KY 22 in Dry Ridge; I-75 in Dry Ridge; KY 17 near DeMossville
- East end: KY 177 near DeMossville

Location
- Country: United States
- State: Kentucky
- Counties: Carroll, Gallatin, Grant, Pendleton

Highway system
- Kentucky State Highway System; Interstate; US; State; Parkways

Kentucky Route 467 is a 41.287-mile state highway in Kentucky that runs from KY 227 just west of Worthville to KY 177 just west of DeMossville.

== Route description ==
KY 467 begins at KY 227 just west of Worthville and runs east through Worthville. It joins KY 36 at an area, which no longer exists, called Eagle Station before both routes enter Sanders. In Sanders, KY 36 and 467 split. KY 36 goes to the right while KY 467 goes to the left with KY 47. Just after crossing the railroad tracks, KY 467 branches to the right while KY 47 heads north for Ghent. A few miles later, KY 467 enters Sparta and joins KY 35 to the right and runs with KY 35 for a couple hundred feet before branching to the left. After KY 467 enters Glencoe, it meets US 127 and merges to the right for a couple hundred feet before branching to the left. After it enters into Dry Ridge, it meets KY 22 and joins it for 3.2 miles as it bypasses Dry Ridge to the north and east. KY 467 meets Interstate 75 just after joining KY 22. KY 467 and KY 22 meet US-25 north of the city and use the newer Dry Ridge Bypass to bypass the city to the north. On the east side of the city, it branches from US 25 and KY 22 and heads east again. KY 467 turns to the north before meeting Kentucky Route 17. KY 467 uses KY 17 for a short bit before KY 467 branches to the right. In less than a mile, KY 467 comes to an end at KY 177, just west of DeMossville.

== History ==
KY 467 was formed in 1953–1954.

The original KY 467 ran from US 31W in Park City south to KY 80 in Bon Ayr; this route became part of KY 225 when it was extended south.

== Major intersections ==
County	Location	mi	km	Destinations	Notes
Carroll	Worthville	0.000	0.000	KY 227	Western terminus
Carroll	Eagle Station	4.524	7.281	KY 36 west	Western terminus of concurrency with KY-36
Carroll	Sanders	8.557	13.771	KY 36 east / KY 47 north (Pike Street)	Eastern terminus of concurrency with KY-36; southern terminus of KY-47
Gallatin	Sparta	11.332	18.237	KY 35 north (Sparta Pike)	Northern end of concurrency with KY-35
Gallatin	Sparta	11.363	18.287	KY 35 south (Sparta Pike)	Southern end of concurrency with KY-35
Gallatin	Glencoe	16.864	27.140	US 127 north (Main Street)	Northern end of concurrency with US-127
Gallatin	Glencoe	16.931	27.248	US 127 south (Main Street)	Southern end of concurrency with US-127
Grant	Folsom	21.259	34.213	KY 1942 north (Elliston-Mt. Zion Road)	Southern terminus of KY-1942
Grant	Folsom	21.880	35.212	KY 1132 south (Jonesville Road)	Northern terminus of KY-1132
Grant	Dry Ridge	30.973	49.846	KY 22 west (Taft Highway)	Eastern end of concurrency with KY-22
Grant	Dry Ridge	31.314	50.395	I-75 south – Lexington	Exit 159 off I-75 South and ramp to I-75 South
Grant	Dry Ridge	31.361	50.471	I-75 north – Cincinnati	Exit 159 off I-75 North and ramp to I-75 North
Grant	Dry Ridge	31.650	50.936	KY 22 Bus. east (Broadway Street)	West end of Dry Ridge Bypass; western terminus of KY-22 Business. 22-Business continues east while 22 and 467 turn north
Grant	Dry Ridge	31.986	51.476	US 25 north (Dixie Highway)	North/west end of concurrency with US-25
Grant	Dry Ridge	35.198	56.646	US 25 south / KY 22 east	End of concurrency with US-25 and KY-22; bypass continues south
Grant		37.762	60.772	KY 489 south	Northern terminus of KY-489
Pendleton		43.103	69.368	KY 3184 west (Center Ridge Road)	Eastern terminus of KY-3184
Pendleton		43.457	69.937	KY 1657 east (Lightfoot Fork Road)	Western terminus of KY-1657
Pendleton	DeMossville	47.720	76.798	KY 17 south	Southern end of KY-17 concurrency
Pendleton	DeMossville	47.783	76.899	KY 17 north	Northern end of KY-17 concurrency; T junction - KY-17 to the left, KY-467 to KY-177 to the right
Pendleton	DeMossville	48.380	77.860	KY 177	Eastern terminus just south of DeMossville
1.000 mi = 1.609 km; 1.000 km = 0.621 mi: Concurrency terminus
