= Kentucky Route 47 =

State highway in Kentucky, United States

Kentucky Route 47

Route information
- Maintained by KYTC
- Length: 9.851 mi (15.854 km)

Major junctions
- South end: KY 36 / KY 467 in Sanders
- North end: US 42 in Ghent

Location
- Country: United States
- State: Kentucky
- Counties: Carroll, Gallatin

Highway system
- Kentucky State Highway System; Interstate; US; State; Parkways
| ← KY 46 | → KY 48 |

Kentucky Route 47 is a 9.851-mile state highway in Kentucky that runs from KY 36 and KY 467 in Sanders to US 42 in Ghent KY 47 mostly stays in Carroll County but makes a short entrance into Gallatin County while passing under Interstate 71.

== Route description ==
KY 47 begins at an intersection with KY 36/KY 467 in Sanders, Carroll County, heading north as a two-lane undivided road concurrent with KY 467. The road crosses a CSX railroad line before KY 467 splits to the northeast. KY 47 continues north through areas of homes before it leaves Sanders and heads into woodland. The road curves to the northwest and heads north-northwest through a mix of farmland and woods. The route crosses into Gallatin County, where it intersects the western terminus of KY 465 before passing under I-71 without an interchange. KY 47 heads back into Carroll County and comes to an intersection with the southern terminus of KY 184, at which point it runs to the northwest through forested areas. The road heads west through fields and woods before intersecting the northern terminus of KY 2984 and curves to the northwest, becoming Main Cross Street. The route winds west through more rural areas before heading to the north into forests and intersecting the eastern terminus of KY 1112. KY 47 passes through more farm fields and woodland before crossing a CSX railroad line and heading into Ghent. The route runs past homes and businesses before it ends at US 42.

== Major intersections ==
| County | Location | mi | km | Destinations | Notes |
|---|---|---|---|---|---|
| Carroll | Sanders | 0.000 | 0.000 | KY 36 (Pike Street) / KY 467 west | Southern terminus; South end of KY 467 overlap |
| Carroll | Sanders | 0.068 | 0.109 | KY 467 east | North end of KY 467 overlap |
| Gallatin | | 1.993 | 3.207 | KY 465 east (Boone Road) | Western terminus of KY 465 |
| Carroll | | 2.350 | 3.782 | KY 184 north (Walnut Valley Road) | Southern terminus of KY 184 |
| Carroll | | 4.461 | 7.179 | KY 2984 south (Dividing Ridge Road) | Northern terminus of KY 2984 |
| Carroll | | 8.554 | 13.766 | KY 1112 west (Bucks Run Road) | Eastern terminus of KY 1112 |
| Carroll | Ghent | 9.851 | 15.854 | US 42 (Main Street) / Main Cross Street | Northern terminus |
1.000 mi = 1.609 km; 1.000 km = 0.621 mi: Concurrency terminus
