= Kentucky Route 455 =

State highway in Kentucky, United States

Kentucky Route 455
- KY 455 highlighted in red

Route information
- Maintained by KYTC
- Length: 7.111 mi (11.444 km)

Major junctions
- South end: KY 16 in Glencoe
- US 127 in Glencoe; KY 465 west of Glencoe
- North end: KY 35 in Warsaw

Location
- Country: United States
- State: Kentucky
- Counties: Gallatin

Highway system
- Kentucky State Highway System; Interstate; US; State; Parkways
← KY 454	→ KY 456

Kentucky Route 455 (KY 455) is a 7.111-mile-long (11.444 km) state highway in the U.S. state of Kentucky. The highway connects Glencoe and Warsaw, within Gallatin County.

== Route description ==
KY 455 begins at an intersection with KY 16 on the east-central edge of Glencoe, within the southeastern part of Gallatin County. It travels to the west-northwest and enters Glencoe proper. It has a brief concurrency with US 127. When KY 455 splits off, it travels to the west-southwest. It curves to the northwest and crosses over Interstate 71 (I-71). The highway curves back to the west-southwest and intersects the eastern terminus of KY 465 (Boone Road). It travels to the north-northwest and curves to the northwest. The highway makes a gradual curve to the west-northwest and meets its eastern terminus, an intersection with KY 35 (Sparta Pike) on the southern edge of Warsaw.

== Major intersections ==
The entire route is in Gallatin County.

Location	mi	km	Destinations	Notes
Glencoe	0.000	0.000	KY 16	Southern terminus
Glencoe	0.660	1.062	US 127 south – Owenton	Southern end of US 127 concurrency
Glencoe	0.660	1.062	US 127 north to I-71 – Florence	Northern end of US 127 concurrency
	3.152	5.073	KY 465 west (Boone Road)	Eastern terminus of KY 465
Warsaw	7.111	11.444	KY 35 (Sparta Pike)	Northern terminus
1.000 mi = 1.609 km; 1.000 km = 0.621 mi: Concurrency terminus
