= Eagle Creek (Kentucky) =

Physical characteristics
- Source
  - location: Scott County
- Mouth
  - location: Kentucky River in Carroll County
  - elevation: 427 ft (130 m)
- Discharge
  - location: Glencoe
  - average: 593 cu/ft. per sec.

Eagle Creek is a long meandering stream running through several counties in central Kentucky in the United States. It is a tributary of the Kentucky River, the confluence of which is near Worthville in Carroll County.

== Features ==
Point	Coordinates (links to map & photo sources)
Delaplain (source of creek)	38.3389622°N 84.5127195°W
Sadieville	38.4397930°N 84.6246665°W
New Columbus	38.5000692°N 84.6910565°W
Lawrenceville	38.6250672°N 84.7082791°W
Elliston	38.6850659°N 84.7496693°W
Sanders	38.6331200°N 84.9999499°W
Vevay South	38.6250644°N 85.0130059°W
Worthville (mouth of creek)	38.5967312°N 85.0738407°W

== See also ==
- List of rivers of Kentucky
