= Kentucky Route 35 =

Highway in Kentucky

Kentucky Route 35
- KY 35 highlighted in red

Route information
- Maintained by KYTC
- Length: 12.833 mi (20.653 km)

Major junctions
- South end: US 127 near Sparta
- I-71 near Sparta
- North end: US 42 in Warsaw

Location
- Country: United States
- State: Kentucky
- Counties: Owen, Gallatin

Highway system
- Kentucky State Highway System; Interstate; US; State; Parkways
← KY 34	→ KY 36

Kentucky Route 35 (KY 35) is a 12.833-mile-long state highway in Kentucky that runs from US 127 in Owen County south of Sparta and heads north and goes through Sparta and meets KY 467 before meeting Interstate 71. KY 35 then passes by the Kentucky Speedway and comes to an end at US 42 in Warsaw.

== Route description ==
KY 35 begins at an intersection with US 127 in Owen County, heading northwest as a two-lane undivided road. The route passes through farmland with some trees and homes and intersects the southern terminus of KY 1316. The road heads through woods before curving west and passing farm fields. It descends a long hill into the broad Eagle Creek valley and crosses the creek at Sparta in Gallatin County, in which it is Sparta Pike. In Sparta, the road crosses a CSX railroad line and intersects KY 467. The route forms a brief concurrency with KY 467 for a block and passes homes and businesses. Upon splitting, KY 35 curves north and leaves Sparta, becoming a three-lane road with two northbound lanes and one southbound lane. The road continues through woodland before it runs between woods to the west and farm fields to the east. The route passes through more agricultural areas and crosses KY 465 before it gains a center left-turn lane and comes to an interchange with I-71.

Past this interchange, KY 35 continues north as a three-lane road with a center left-turn lane and passes to the east of Kentucky Speedway. The road loses the turning lane and curves northeast into a mix of fields and woods with some homes, turning back to the north. The route winds north through more forested areas with occasional clearings and residences. KY 35 intersects the northern terminus of KY 1130 before heading to the northeast and coming to a junction with the northern terminus of KY 455. The road heads into agricultural areas with some homes, where it curves to the north-northwest and enters Warsaw. KY 35 passes through residential areas before it heads onto Main Cross Street and comes to its northern terminus at US 42 in the downtown area.

== History ==
KY 35 originally ran to the Tennessee border using what is now US 127 before the US 127 was extended to its current longevity after it was extended into Kentucky and Tennessee in the late 1950s.

== Major intersections ==
County	Location	mi	km	Destinations	Notes
Owen	Bromley	0.000	0.000	US 127 to I-71 north	Southern terminus
Owen		1.771	2.850	KY 1316 north	
Gallatin	Sparta	4.181	6.729	KY 467 east	South end of KY 467 overlap
Gallatin	Sparta	4.212	6.779	KY 467 west	North end of KY 467 overlap
Gallatin	Sparta	6.008	9.669	KY 465 (Boone Road)	
Gallatin	Sparta	6.217	10.005	I-71 – Louisville, Cincinnati	I-71 exit 57
Gallatin		10.441	16.803	KY 1130 south (Craigs Creek Road)	
Gallatin		11.674	18.787	KY 455 south (Johnson Road)	
Gallatin	Warsaw	12.833	20.653	US 42 (Main Street)	Northern terminus
1.000 mi = 1.609 km; 1.000 km = 0.621 mi
