= Sparta, Kentucky =

- City
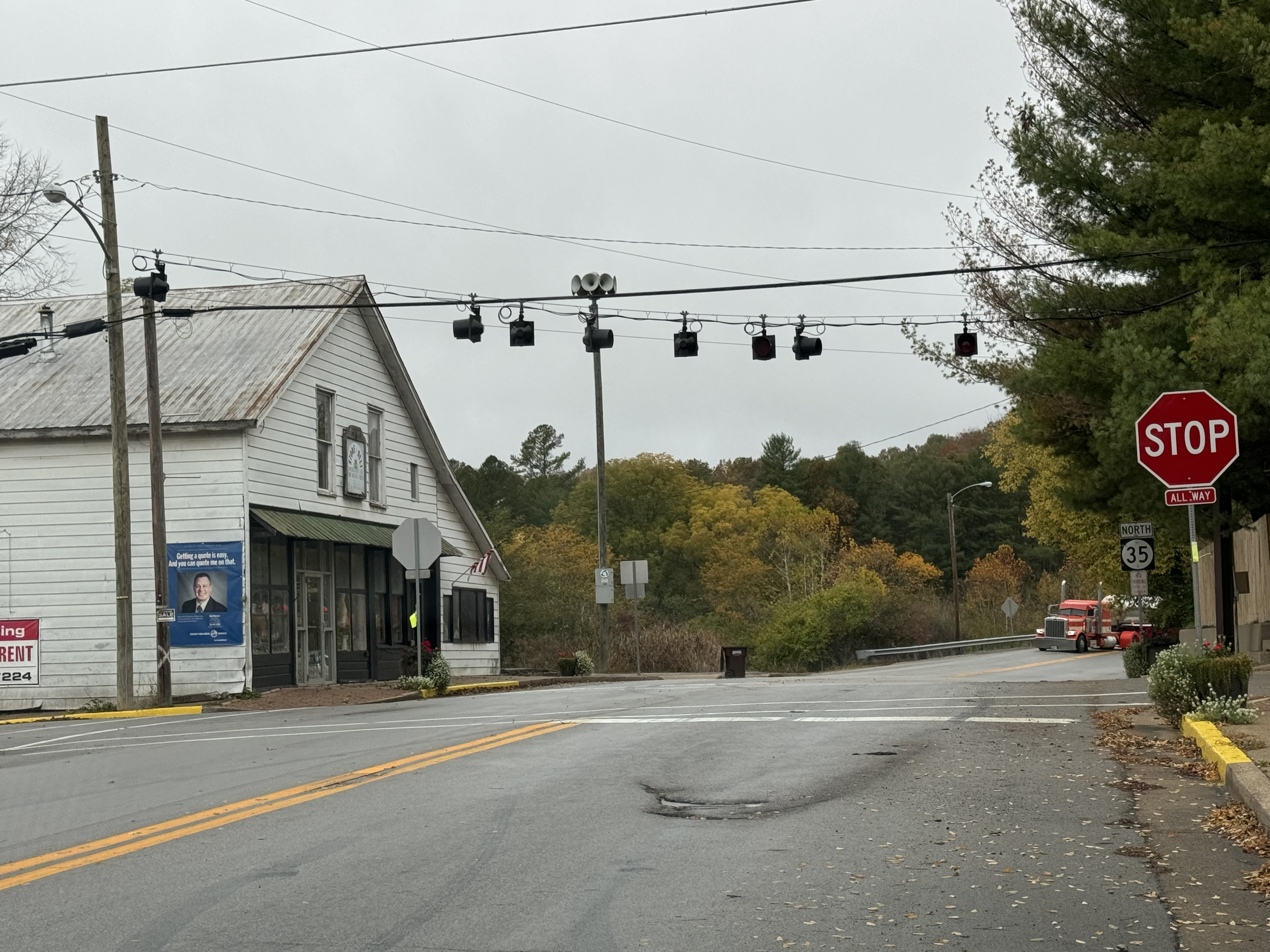
- Sparta in October 2023.

- Location of Sparta in Owen County, Kentucky.
- Coordinates: 38°41′45″N 84°52′22″W
- Country: United States
- State: Kentucky
- Counties: Gallatin, Owen

Area
  - Total: 6.29 sq mi (16.30 km^{2})
  - Land: 6.26 sq mi (16.22 km^{2})
  - Water: 0.031 sq mi (0.08 km^{2})
- Elevation: 732 ft (223 m)

Population (2020)
  - Total: 236
  - Density: 37.7/sq mi (14.55/km^{2})
- Time zone: UTC-5 (Eastern (EST))
  - Summer (DST): UTC-4 (EDT)
- ZIP code: 41086
- Area code: 859
- FIPS code: 21-72372
- GNIS feature ID: 2405502

Sparta is a home rule-class city in Gallatin and Owen counties in the U.S. state of Kentucky. As of the 2020 census, Sparta had a population of 236.

Sparta is home to Kentucky Speedway.

== Geography ==
Sparta is located in southwestern Gallatin County. The center of town is in Gallatin County on the north side of Eagle Creek; the city limits extend south across the creek into Owen County and north for 3 miles (5 km) up Kentucky Route 35, past Interstate 71 at Exit 57 and encompassing all of the Kentucky Speedway north of the Interstate. Via KY 35 it is 8 miles (13 km) north to Warsaw, the Gallatin County seat, and south 12 miles (19 km) to Owenton, the Owen County seat. I-71 leads northeast 38 miles (61 km) to Covington and southwest 58 miles (93 km) to Louisville. Kentucky Route 467 crosses KY 35 in the center of Sparta, leading northeast 5.5 miles (8.9 km) to Glencoe and southwest 3 miles (5 km) to Sanders.

According to the United States Census Bureau, the city has a total area of 5.88 square miles (15.24 km^{2}), of which 5.85 square miles (15.16 km^{2}) is land and 0.03 square miles (0.09 km^{2}), or 0.57%, is water. Eagle Creek, which flows past the center of town, continues west to the Kentucky River, a tributary of the Ohio River.

== History ==
Sparta began as a village named "Brock's Station" in 1802, and was incorporated as a town in 1852. The community took its name from the local Sparta gristmill. Sparta became a stop on the Louisville & Nashville Railroad; the CSX railroad still runs through Sparta along Eagle Creek.

Interstate 71 now is one mile from the city. In 1999, the Kentucky Speedway was built to eventually host a NASCAR Sprint Cup Series race. In 2000, the Truck Series raced the inaugural race, and an Xfinity Series race was held the next year. Finally in 2011, the Sprint Cup Series came and hosted their inaugural race.

== Demographics ==
Historical population
Census	Pop.	Note	%±
1880	62		—
1910	107		—
1940	563		—
1950	298		−47.1%
1960	235		−21.1%
1970	213		−9.4%
1980	192		−9.9%
1990	133		−30.7%
2000	230		72.9%
2010	231		0.4%
2020	236		2.2%
U.S. Decennial Census

As of the census of 2000, there were 230 people, 88 households, and 63 families residing in the city. The population density was 41.5 inhabitants per square mile (16.0/km^{2}). There were 108 housing units at an average density of 19.5 per square mile (7.5/km^{2}). The racial makeup of the city was 96.09% White, 3.04% African American, 0.43% from other races, and 0.43% from two or more races. Hispanic or Latino of any race were 2.61% of the population.

There were 88 households, out of which 31.8% had children under the age of 18 living with them, 54.5% were married couples living together, 14.8% had a female householder with no husband present, and 27.3% were non-families. 22.7% of all households were made up of individuals, and 11.4% had someone living alone who was 65 years of age or older. The average household size was 2.61 and the average family size was 3.00.

In the city, the population was spread out, with 23.5% under the age of 18, 8.7% from 18 to 24, 33.5% from 25 to 44, 19.1% from 45 to 64, and 15.2% who were 65 years of age or older. The median age was 34 years. For every 100 females, there were 109.1 males. For every 100 females age 18 and over, there were 102.3 males.

The median income for a household in the city was $27,083, and the median income for a family was $31,250. Males had a median income of $27,000 versus $16,875 for females. The per capita income for the city was $16,093. About 8.1% of families and 9.9% of the population were below the poverty line, including 3.2% of those under the age of eighteen and none of those 65 or over.
