= Rutus Sarlls =

Rutus Sarlls (1848–1913) was a late 19th Century Euro-American settler of South McAlester, Indian Territory, and was a prominent attorney, businessman, inventor, and political candidate. He led the path to provide for non Native American property ownership in the Indian Territory (which later became part of the new State of Oklahoma), and is most notable for having prevailed in a United States Supreme Court case where his conviction for selling liquor to Native Americans was overturned.

== Early life ==
Sarlls was born in Ghent, Carroll County, Kentucky, on November 13, 1848, to James Brooks Sarlls and Mary Adeline Evertson.

== Professional life ==
Sarlls received his law degree from the University of Michigan in 1874. In 1878 he and Alexander Kelman were granted a patent for a combined planter, cultivator, and cotton-chopper. In 1883 he and Virgil Holland secured a patent for a permutation lock.

Sarlls practiced law briefly in Gainesville, Texas, before settling in South McAlester in 1890, becoming its first attorney. He tried the first case in the new Federal Court in the town.

In 1901 he first ran for Mayor of South McAlester, losing to Fielding Lewis. Sarlls was characterized as "the standard bearer for the wide open people, which is chiefly composed of the gamblers and whiskey peddlers." He ran again in 1903, losing resoundingly to H. H. Keller. In 1907 Sarlls ran for the newly created Oklahoma's 4th congressional district, losing to Charles D. Carter, a Native American; He ran again for Mayor in 1914.

Sarlls operated, with a cousin, the main hotel in South McAlester on Choctaw Ave.

== Advocacy for non Native American property ownership rights ==
Sarlls became a real estate investor in South McAlester, securing the right of non-Native Americans to own land in the town through legal actions involving the Choctaw. One of the earliest challenges was when the Choctaw Sheriff of Tobucksy County, citing tribal law, tried to sell a three-story brick building Sarlls erected in town; he secured a Federal injunction preventing the sale on the basis that this taking violated his Equal Protection rights under the Fourteenth Amendment to the United States Constitution.

Sarlls was a proponent for of the Atoka Agreement (about which he conferred with Choctaw Chief Green McCurtain and lobbied in Washington, D.C.), and later the Curtis Act, which disbanded communal lands and provided for the ability of non-Native Americans to own property, both of which set the stage for Oklahoma statehood.

== Sarlls vs. United States 152 U.S. 570 (1894) ==
In May 1892 the United States District Court of Arkansas, which had jurisdiction for Indian Territory prior to its inclusion into the state of Oklahoma, found Sarlls guilty of violating section 2139, Revised Statutes of the United States, which was as follows:

"No ardent spirits shall be introduced, under any pretense, into the Indian country. Every person, (except an Indian, in the Indian country,) who sells, exchanges, gives, barters, or disposes of any spirituous liquors or wine to any Indian under the charge of any Indian superintendent or agent, or introduces or attempts to introduce any spirituous liquor or wine into the Indian country, shall be punishable by imprisonment for not more than two years, and by a fine of not more than three hundred dollars..."

Sarlls had sold ten gallons of lager beer. During his trial he alleged that the beer he sold was erroneously considered as spirits. The prevailing judge in the lower court, Judge Isaac C. Parker, refused to present this argument to the jury. Sarlls was sentenced to a fine of $250 and three months in prison.

His case was submitted to the United States Supreme Court on November 15, 1893. The Court utilized definitions of Century Dictionary and Webster's Dictionary for guidance. Century defined spirituous liquors as "containing much alcohol; distilled, whether pure or compounded, as distinguished from fermented; ardent: applied to a liquor for drinking," with Webster further defining "spiritous" as "rum, whiskey, brandy, and other distilled liquors." Century further defined "Malt liquor" as "a general term for an alcoholic beverage produced merely by the fermentation of malt, as opposed to those obtained by distillation of malt or mash."

The Court looked further for guidance at section 3244, Revised Statutes, which provided for separate and distinct definitions and treatments of spiritous versus malt liquors, and noted a recent Congressional amendment to prior law which added ale and beer to the list of intoxicating items prohibited for sale in Indian Territory. Since Sarlls' sales occurred prior to this congressional amendment, it showed that he was innocent of the then prevailing statute.

The Supreme Court entered its decision to reverse Sarlls' conviction on April 9, 1894. The decision was authored by George Shiras Jr. and was considered a precedential case.

== Family and death ==
Sarlls married Grace Whistler in 1894 in Chicago, Illinois. He later married Alice Abigail Sprague in 1901.

Sarlls died in May 1915 in South McAlester, survived by his spouse Alice.
