= Tomtown, Kentucky =

Tomtown
- Ghost town
- Location within the state of Kentucky Tomtown (the United States)
- Coordinates: 38°35′41″N 85°10′32″W
- Country: United States
- State: Kentucky
- County: Carroll
- Time zone: UTC−5 (EST)
  - Summer (DST): UTC−4 (EDT)
- ZIP codes: 41008

Tomtown is a ghost town in southern Carroll County, Kentucky, United States.
