= Gallatin County Airport =

- IATA: none; ICAO: none; FAA LID: 8GK

Summary
- Airport type: Public
- Operator: Gallatin County
- Location: Gallatin County, Kentucky, United States
- Elevation AMSL: 830 ft / 253 m
- Coordinates: 38°40′46″N 84°55′44″W

Map
- Location of airport in Kentucky 8GK (the United States)

Runways
Direction	Length		Surface
Direction	ft	m	Surface
6/24	5,000	1,524	Concrete
- Source: Airnav.com

Gallatin County Airport (FAA LID: 8GK) is a public use airport in Gallatin County, Kentucky, United States, located 1 mile north of Sparta. The airport received funding from federal, state, and local governments in 2019, and opened to the public in June 2023.

== See also ==
- List of airports in Kentucky
