= 1956 United States presidential election in Kentucky =

- November 6, 1956

All 10 Kentucky votes to the Electoral College

Nominee	Dwight D. Eisenhower	Adlai Stevenson
Party	Republican	Democratic
Home state	Pennsylvania (Note: Although he was born in Texas and grew up in Kansas before his military career, at the time of the 1952 election Eisenhower was president of Columbia University and was, officially, a resident of New York. During his first term as president, he moved his private residence to Gettysburg, Pennsylvania, and officially changed his residency to Pennsylvania.)	Illinois
Running mate	Richard Nixon	Estes Kefauver
Electoral vote	10	0
Popular vote	572,192	476,453
Percentage	54.30%	45.21%
County results
Eisenhower
40–50%
50–60%
60–70%
70–80%
80–90%
Stevenson
40–50%
50–60%
60–70%
70–80%
President before election
Dwight D. Eisenhower
Republican
Elected President
Dwight D. Eisenhower
Republican

The 1956 United States presidential election in Kentucky took place on November 6, 1956, as part of the 1956 United States presidential election. Kentucky voters chose ten representatives, or electors, to the Electoral College, who voted for president and vice president.

Kentucky was won by incumbent President Dwight D. Eisenhower (R–Pennsylvania), running with Vice President Richard Nixon, with 54.30 percent of the popular vote, against Adlai Stevenson (D–Illinois), running with Senator Estes Kefauver, with 45.21 percent of the popular vote. Along with Louisiana and West Virginia, Kentucky was one of the 3 states Eisenhower lost in 1952, but managed to flip in 1956.

== Results ==
1956 United States presidential election in Kentucky
Party	Candidate	Votes	%
Republican	Dwight D. Eisenhower (inc.)	572,192	54.30%
Democratic	Adlai Stevenson	476,453	45.21%
States’ Rights	Harry F. Byrd	2,657	0.25%
Prohibition	Enoch A. Holtwick	2,145	0.20%
Socialist Labor	Eric Hass	358	0.03%
Total votes		1,053,805	100%

=== Results by county ===
County	Dwight D. Eisenhower Republican		Adlai Stevenson Democratic		Harry F. Byrd States’ Rights		Enoch A. Holtwick Prohibition		Eric Hass Socialist Labor		Margin		Total votes cast
County	#	%	#	%	#	%	#	%	#	%	#	%	Total votes cast
Adair	4,157	62.50%	2,491	37.45%	1	0.02%	1	0.02%	1	0.02%	1,666	25.05%	6,651
Allen	3,200	61.62%	1,975	38.03%	3	0.06%	15	0.29%	0	0.00%	1,225	23.59%	5,193
Anderson	1,878	47.27%	2,089	52.58%	4	0.10%	2	0.05%	0	0.00%	-211	-5.31%	3,973
Ballard	838	21.29%	3,088	78.46%	4	0.10%	4	0.10%	2	0.05%	-2,250	-57.17%	3,936
Barren	4,206	44.68%	5,206	55.30%	1	0.01%	1	0.01%	0	0.00%	-1,000	-10.62%	9,414
Bath	1,889	45.79%	2,221	53.84%	9	0.22%	6	0.15%	0	0.00%	-332	-8.05%	4,125
Bell	6,824	60.29%	4,477	39.55%	18	0.16%	0	0.00%	0	0.00%	2,347	20.74%	11,319
Boone	3,139	51.54%	2,933	48.16%	14	0.23%	4	0.07%	0	0.00%	206	3.38%	6,090
Bourbon	2,475	42.75%	3,263	56.36%	14	0.24%	33	0.57%	5	0.09%	-788	-13.61%	5,790
Boyd	11,502	57.28%	8,546	42.56%	10	0.05%	22	0.11%	2	0.01%	2,956	14.72%	20,082
Boyle	3,427	49.81%	3,436	49.94%	10	0.15%	5	0.07%	2	0.03%	-9	-0.13%	6,880
Bracken	1,754	53.54%	1,515	46.25%	6	0.18%	1	0.03%	0	0.00%	239	7.29%	3,276
Breathitt	2,423	42.71%	3,246	57.22%	4	0.07%	0	0.00%	0	0.00%	-823	-14.51%	5,673
Breckinridge	3,784	56.72%	2,867	42.98%	13	0.19%	7	0.10%	0	0.00%	917	13.74%	6,671
Bullitt	2,007	46.78%	2,279	53.12%	2	0.05%	1	0.02%	1	0.02%	-272	-6.34%	4,290
Butler	3,303	73.19%	1,202	26.63%	2	0.04%	5	0.11%	1	0.02%	2,101	46.56%	4,513
Caldwell	2,681	52.32%	2,417	47.17%	22	0.43%	3	0.06%	1	0.02%	264	5.15%	5,124
Calloway	2,292	27.09%	6,152	72.72%	4	0.05%	10	0.12%	2	0.02%	-3,860	-45.63%	8,460
Campbell	18,617	63.82%	10,359	35.51%	121	0.41%	56	0.19%	18	0.06%	8,258	28.31%	29,171
Carlisle	608	22.72%	2,063	77.09%	5	0.19%	0	0.00%	0	0.00%	-1,455	-54.37%	2,676
Carroll	1,130	34.08%	2,169	65.41%	10	0.30%	5	0.15%	2	0.06%	-1,039	-31.33%	3,316
Carter	5,127	62.09%	3,112	37.68%	8	0.10%	8	0.10%	3	0.04%	2,015	24.41%	8,258
Casey	4,167	72.48%	1,570	27.31%	2	0.03%	8	0.14%	2	0.03%	2,597	45.17%	5,749
Christian	4,963	43.18%	6,487	56.43%	38	0.33%	5	0.04%	2	0.02%	-1,524	-13.25%	11,495
Clark	3,030	45.48%	3,609	54.16%	17	0.26%	5	0.08%	2	0.03%	-579	-8.68%	6,663
Clay	4,897	82.52%	1,027	17.31%	3	0.05%	5	0.08%	2	0.03%	3,870	65.21%	5,934
Clinton	3,396	81.89%	747	18.01%	3	0.07%	1	0.02%	0	0.00%	2,649	63.88%	4,147
Crittenden	2,548	62.64%	1,494	36.73%	19	0.47%	4	0.10%	3	0.07%	1,054	25.91%	4,068
Cumberland	2,584	71.76%	1,000	27.77%	4	0.11%	10	0.28%	3	0.08%	1,584	43.99%	3,601
Daviess	11,491	62.54%	6,674	36.33%	50	0.27%	146	0.79%	12	0.07%	4,817	26.21%	18,373
Edmonson	2,800	71.85%	1,092	28.02%	1	0.03%	3	0.08%	1	0.03%	1,708	43.83%	3,897
Elliott	1,033	32.53%	2,143	67.47%	0	0.00%	0	0.00%	0	0.00%	-1,110	-34.94%	3,176
Estill	2,946	60.52%	1,912	39.28%	2	0.04%	7	0.14%	1	0.02%	1,034	21.24%	4,868
Fayette	21,904	61.38%	13,547	37.96%	84	0.24%	132	0.37%	16	0.04%	8,357	23.42%	35,683
Fleming	2,744	51.97%	2,519	47.71%	9	0.17%	6	0.11%	2	0.04%	225	4.26%	5,280
Floyd	6,166	43.77%	7,907	56.13%	1	0.01%	10	0.07%	4	0.03%	-1,741	-12.36%	14,088
Franklin	4,047	38.35%	6,412	60.76%	19	0.18%	70	0.66%	5	0.05%	-2,365	-22.41%	10,553
Fulton	1,147	27.79%	2,953	71.54%	23	0.56%	5	0.12%	0	0.00%	-1,806	-43.75%	4,128
Gallatin	547	30.89%	1,223	69.06%	1	0.06%	0	0.00%	0	0.00%	-676	-38.17%	1,771
Garrard	2,311	55.92%	1,798	43.50%	3	0.07%	19	0.46%	2	0.05%	513	12.42%	4,133
Grant	1,680	42.04%	2,300	57.56%	10	0.25%	5	0.13%	1	0.03%	-620	-15.52%	3,996
Graves	3,711	26.86%	10,090	73.04%	8	0.06%	6	0.04%	0	0.00%	-6,379	-46.18%	13,815
Grayson	4,565	69.25%	2,021	30.66%	2	0.03%	4	0.06%	0	0.00%	2,544	38.59%	6,592
Green	2,951	62.93%	1,726	36.81%	8	0.17%	3	0.06%	1	0.02%	1,225	26.12%	4,689
Greenup	5,464	51.85%	5,045	47.87%	15	0.14%	10	0.09%	4	0.04%	419	3.98%	10,538
Hancock	1,317	56.14%	1,022	43.56%	4	0.17%	2	0.09%	1	0.04%	295	12.58%	2,346
Hardin	5,050	53.55%	4,325	45.86%	17	0.18%	33	0.35%	5	0.05%	725	7.69%	9,430
Harlan	8,820	55.96%	6,915	43.87%	8	0.05%	9	0.06%	9	0.06%	1,905	12.09%	15,761
Harrison	2,128	37.62%	3,515	62.14%	9	0.16%	4	0.07%	1	0.02%	-1,387	-24.52%	5,657
Hart	3,276	50.35%	3,207	49.29%	11	0.17%	5	0.08%	7	0.11%	69	1.06%	6,506
Henderson	5,085	46.92%	5,501	50.76%	226	2.09%	23	0.21%	3	0.03%	-416	-3.84%	10,838
Henry	1,670	34.52%	3,157	65.25%	5	0.10%	5	0.10%	1	0.02%	-1,487	-30.73%	4,838
Hickman	785	24.82%	2,367	74.83%	9	0.28%	1	0.03%	1	0.03%	-1,582	-50.01%	3,163
Hopkins	5,300	44.47%	6,535	54.84%	73	0.61%	7	0.06%	2	0.02%	-1,235	-10.37%	11,917
Jackson	3,950	88.35%	501	11.21%	6	0.13%	9	0.20%	5	0.11%	3,449	77.14%	4,471
Jefferson	119,262	58.49%	83,483	40.94%	357	0.18%	727	0.36%	88	0.04%	35,779	17.55%	203,917
Jessamine	2,340	51.39%	2,072	45.51%	53	1.16%	70	1.54%	18	0.40%	268	5.88%	4,553
Johnson	5,802	71.06%	2,356	28.85%	6	0.07%	1	0.01%	0	0.00%	3,446	42.21%	8,165
Kenton	20,895	57.93%	14,923	41.37%	202	0.56%	33	0.09%	17	0.05%	5,972	16.56%	36,070
Knott	1,715	30.02%	3,987	69.80%	6	0.11%	4	0.07%	0	0.00%	-2,272	-39.78%	5,712
Knox	6,341	71.39%	2,539	28.59%	1	0.01%	1	0.01%	0	0.00%	3,802	42.80%	8,882
LaRue	2,387	56.05%	1,859	43.65%	10	0.23%	3	0.07%	0	0.00%	528	12.40%	4,259
Laurel	6,586	73.87%	2,316	25.98%	7	0.08%	5	0.06%	2	0.02%	4,270	47.89%	8,916
Lawrence	2,932	53.92%	2,495	45.88%	2	0.04%	6	0.11%	3	0.06%	437	8.04%	5,438
Lee	1,774	65.32%	938	34.54%	4	0.15%	0	0.00%	0	0.00%	836	30.78%	2,716
Leslie	3,770	87.37%	531	12.31%	3	0.07%	8	0.19%	3	0.07%	3,239	75.06%	4,315
Letcher	5,741	57.97%	4,133	41.73%	11	0.11%	16	0.16%	3	0.03%	1,608	16.24%	9,904
Lewis	3,333	67.65%	1,585	32.17%	2	0.04%	7	0.14%	0	0.00%	1,748	35.48%	4,927
Lincoln	3,535	54.30%	2,953	45.36%	11	0.17%	9	0.14%	2	0.03%	582	8.94%	6,510
Livingston	1,247	40.94%	1,795	58.93%	3	0.10%	1	0.03%	0	0.00%	-548	-17.99%	3,046
Logan	2,855	34.93%	5,299	64.83%	12	0.15%	4	0.05%	4	0.05%	-2,444	-29.90%	8,174
Lyon	989	39.01%	1,527	60.24%	13	0.51%	5	0.20%	1	0.04%	-538	-21.23%	2,535
Madison	5,955	50.85%	5,670	48.42%	26	0.22%	55	0.47%	4	0.03%	285	2.43%	11,710
Magoffin	2,343	51.96%	2,162	47.95%	1	0.02%	3	0.07%	0	0.00%	181	4.01%	4,509
Marion	2,945	49.98%	2,927	49.68%	10	0.17%	8	0.14%	2	0.03%	18	0.30%	5,892
Marshall	2,015	31.57%	4,358	68.29%	2	0.03%	7	0.11%	0	0.00%	-2,343	-36.72%	6,382
Martin	2,927	80.57%	694	19.10%	4	0.11%	7	0.19%	1	0.03%	2,233	61.47%	3,633
Mason	3,880	51.80%	3,572	47.69%	31	0.41%	6	0.08%	1	0.01%	308	4.11%	7,490
McCracken	7,076	33.29%	14,103	66.34%	42	0.20%	35	0.16%	2	0.01%	-7,027	-33.05%	21,258
McCreary	3,812	82.33%	814	17.58%	3	0.06%	1	0.02%	0	0.00%	2,998	64.75%	4,630
McLean	1,886	48.73%	1,965	50.78%	7	0.18%	11	0.28%	1	0.03%	-79	-2.05%	3,870
Meade	1,670	45.23%	2,016	54.60%	5	0.14%	1	0.03%	0	0.00%	-346	-9.37%	3,692
Menifee	799	40.25%	1,185	59.70%	1	0.05%	0	0.00%	0	0.00%	-386	-19.45%	1,985
Mercer	3,168	53.23%	2,767	46.49%	10	0.17%	5	0.08%	2	0.03%	401	6.74%	5,952
Metcalfe	2,412	54.35%	2,014	45.38%	3	0.07%	9	0.20%	0	0.00%	398	8.97%	4,438
Monroe	3,759	74.97%	1,255	25.03%	0	0.00%	0	0.00%	0	0.00%	2,504	49.94%	5,014
Montgomery	2,220	45.35%	2,656	54.26%	9	0.18%	9	0.18%	1	0.02%	-436	-8.91%	4,895
Morgan	1,878	37.20%	3,164	62.68%	4	0.08%	1	0.02%	1	0.02%	-1,286	-25.48%	5,048
Muhlenberg	5,323	52.64%	4,752	46.99%	29	0.29%	7	0.07%	2	0.02%	571	5.65%	10,113
Nelson	4,107	55.76%	3,240	43.99%	7	0.10%	9	0.12%	2	0.03%	867	11.77%	7,365
Nicholas	999	37.07%	1,667	61.86%	9	0.33%	19	0.71%	1	0.04%	-668	-24.79%	2,695
Ohio	4,901	64.07%	2,726	35.64%	8	0.10%	11	0.14%	3	0.04%	2,175	28.43%	7,649
Oldham	2,128	54.44%	1,769	45.25%	8	0.20%	4	0.10%	0	0.00%	359	9.19%	3,909
Owen	857	22.61%	2,928	77.24%	5	0.13%	1	0.03%	0	0.00%	-2,071	-54.63%	3,791
Owsley	2,013	85.77%	331	14.10%	1	0.04%	1	0.04%	1	0.04%	1,682	71.67%	2,347
Pendleton	2,273	54.46%	1,889	45.26%	6	0.14%	6	0.14%	0	0.00%	384	9.20%	4,174
Perry	6,591	59.05%	4,545	40.72%	8	0.07%	15	0.13%	2	0.02%	2,046	18.33%	11,161
Pike	11,678	50.37%	11,466	49.45%	13	0.06%	25	0.11%	3	0.01%	212	0.92%	23,185
Powell	1,339	49.87%	1,343	50.02%	3	0.11%	0	0.00%	0	0.00%	-4	-0.15%	2,685
Pulaski	10,363	72.47%	3,899	27.27%	18	0.13%	16	0.11%	3	0.02%	6,464	45.20%	14,299
Robertson	617	43.70%	793	56.16%	2	0.14%	0	0.00%	0	0.00%	-176	-12.46%	1,412
Rockcastle	3,787	74.08%	1,313	25.68%	7	0.14%	3	0.06%	2	0.04%	2,474	48.40%	5,112
Rowan	2,470	50.85%	2,380	49.00%	5	0.10%	2	0.04%	0	0.00%	90	1.85%	4,857
Russell	3,065	70.33%	1,284	29.46%	1	0.02%	7	0.16%	1	0.02%	1,781	40.87%	4,358
Scott	1,940	40.02%	2,860	58.99%	12	0.25%	32	0.66%	4	0.08%	-920	-18.97%	4,848
Shelby	2,768	40.71%	4,017	59.08%	6	0.09%	8	0.12%	0	0.00%	-1,249	-18.37%	6,799
Simpson	1,454	33.43%	2,879	66.18%	9	0.21%	6	0.14%	2	0.05%	-1,425	-32.75%	4,350
Spencer	896	42.32%	1,214	57.35%	3	0.14%	2	0.09%	2	0.09%	-318	-15.03%	2,117
Taylor	3,892	61.37%	2,433	38.36%	5	0.08%	10	0.16%	2	0.03%	1,459	23.01%	6,342
Todd	1,480	32.28%	3,087	67.33%	9	0.20%	9	0.20%	0	0.00%	-1,607	-35.05%	4,585
Trigg	1,329	34.47%	2,517	65.29%	7	0.18%	2	0.05%	0	0.00%	-1,188	-30.82%	3,855
Trimble	506	21.90%	1,792	77.58%	1	0.04%	10	0.43%	1	0.04%	-1,286	-55.68%	2,310
Union	1,956	37.67%	2,863	55.13%	369	7.11%	3	0.06%	2	0.04%	-907	-17.46%	5,193
Warren	8,123	53.06%	7,143	46.66%	27	0.18%	14	0.09%	3	0.02%	980	6.40%	15,310
Washington	2,536	54.71%	2,084	44.96%	11	0.24%	1	0.02%	3	0.06%	452	9.75%	4,635
Wayne	3,609	61.15%	2,263	38.34%	18	0.30%	9	0.15%	3	0.05%	1,346	22.81%	5,902
Webster	1,948	37.08%	3,050	58.06%	242	4.61%	9	0.17%	4	0.08%	-1,102	-20.98%	5,253
Whitley	7,759	74.33%	2,656	25.45%	10	0.10%	12	0.11%	1	0.01%	5,103	48.88%	10,438
Wolfe	1,059	38.62%	1,683	61.38%	0	0.00%	0	0.00%	0	0.00%	-624	-22.76%	2,742
Woodford	2,170	50.97%	2,027	47.62%	19	0.45%	37	0.87%	4	0.09%	143	3.35%	4,257
Totals	572,192	54.30%	476,453	45.21%	2,657	0.25%	2,145	0.20%	358	0.03%	95,739	9.09%	1,053,805

==== Counties that flipped from Democratic to Republican ====
- Boone
- Bracken
- Greenup
- Harlan
- Hardin
- Hart
- Jessamine
- Kenton
- LaRue
- Letcher
- Madison
- Magoffin
- Marion
- Mercer
- Mason
- Muhlenberg
- Nelson
- Oldham
- Pendleton
- Perry
- Pike
- Rowan
- Woodford
