= 1964 United States presidential election in Kentucky =

- November 3, 1964

Nominee	Lyndon B. Johnson	Barry Goldwater
Party	Democratic	Republican
Home state	Texas	Arizona
Running mate	Hubert Humphrey	William E. Miller
Electoral vote	9	0
Popular vote	669,659	372,977
Percentage	64.01%	35.65%
County results
Johnson
40–50%
50–60%
60–70%
70–80%
80–90%
90–100%
Goldwater
40–50%
50–60%
60–70%
70–80%
President before election
Lyndon B. Johnson
Democratic
Elected President
Lyndon B. Johnson
Democratic

The 1964 United States presidential election in Kentucky took place on November 3, 1964, as part of the 1964 United States presidential election. Kentucky voters chose 9 representatives, or electors, to the Electoral College, who voted for president and vice president.

Kentucky was won by incumbent President Lyndon B. Johnson (D–Texas), with 64.01% of the popular vote, against Senator Barry Goldwater (R–Arizona), with 35.65% of the popular vote.

This is the solitary occasion since the Civil War where the Unionist stronghold of Knox County voted for a Democratic presidential candidate. As of the 2024 presidential election, this is the last election in which the following counties voted for a Democratic presidential candidate: Kenton, Boone, Campbell, Oldham, Jessamine, Wayne, Whitley, Estill, Garrard, Green, and Lee. This is also the last time that a Republican presidential nominee has failed to win more than 40% of the vote in Kentucky, that the Democrat has won more than 60%, and that the Democratic nominee has won the state by double digits.

== Results ==
Electoral results
Presidential candidate	Party	Home state	Popular vote		Electoral vote	Running mate		
Presidential candidate	Party	Home state	Count	Percentage	Electoral vote	Vice-presidential candidate	Home state	Electoral vote
Lyndon Johnson	Democratic	Texas	669,659	64.01%	9	Hubert Humphrey	Minnesota	9
Barry Goldwater	Republican	Arizona	372,977	35.65%	0	William Miller	New York	0
John Kasper	National States’ Rights	New York	3,469	0.33%	0	Jesse Stoner	Georgia	0
Total			1,046,105	100%	9			9
Needed to win					270			270

=== Results by county ===
County	Lyndon B. Johnson Democratic		Barry Goldwater Republican		John Kasper National States’ Rights		Margin		Total votes cast
County	#	%	#	%	#	%	#	%	Total votes cast
Adair	2,854	48.15%	3,052	51.49%	21	0.35%	-198	-3.34%	5,927
Allen	2,023	46.59%	2,309	53.18%	10	0.23%	-286	-6.59%	4,342
Anderson	2,491	69.46%	1,085	30.26%	10	0.28%	1,406	39.20%	3,586
Ballard	2,867	84.10%	519	15.22%	23	0.67%	2,348	68.88%	3,409
Barren	6,420	68.44%	2,936	31.30%	24	0.26%	3,484	37.14%	9,380
Bath	2,571	71.68%	1,009	28.13%	7	0.20%	1,562	43.55%	3,587
Bell	6,979	62.16%	4,185	37.28%	63	0.56%	2,794	24.88%	11,227
Boone	5,077	59.58%	3,430	40.25%	15	0.18%	1,647	19.33%	8,522
Bourbon	4,068	76.52%	1,222	22.99%	26	0.49%	2,846	53.53%	5,316
Boyd	11,436	62.03%	6,941	37.65%	60	0.33%	4,495	24.38%	18,437
Boyle	4,976	71.47%	1,972	28.33%	14	0.20%	3,004	43.14%	6,962
Bracken	1,958	69.46%	861	30.54%	0	0.00%	1,097	38.92%	2,819
Breathitt	4,714	87.57%	669	12.43%	0	0.00%	4,045	75.14%	5,383
Breckinridge	3,733	63.15%	2,167	36.66%	11	0.19%	1,566	26.49%	5,911
Bullitt	3,900	73.17%	1,417	26.59%	13	0.24%	2,483	46.58%	5,330
Butler	1,555	38.95%	2,429	60.85%	8	0.20%	-874	-21.90%	3,992
Caldwell	2,831	61.57%	1,738	37.80%	29	0.63%	1,093	23.77%	4,598
Calloway	7,290	82.04%	1,576	17.74%	20	0.23%	5,714	64.30%	8,886
Campbell	16,012	56.65%	12,209	43.20%	43	0.15%	3,803	13.45%	28,264
Carlisle	1,565	84.46%	282	15.22%	6	0.32%	1,283	69.24%	1,853
Carroll	2,592	83.48%	491	15.81%	22	0.71%	2,101	67.67%	3,105
Carter	4,136	59.20%	2,821	40.37%	30	0.43%	1,315	18.83%	6,987
Casey	1,875	35.01%	3,457	64.54%	24	0.45%	-1,582	-29.53%	5,356
Christian	8,727	69.10%	3,882	30.74%	21	0.17%	4,845	38.36%	12,630
Clark	4,205	67.42%	2,019	32.37%	13	0.21%	2,186	35.05%	6,237
Clay	3,098	48.84%	3,223	50.81%	22	0.35%	-125	-1.97%	6,343
Clinton	994	29.50%	2,351	69.78%	24	0.71%	-1,357	-40.28%	3,369
Crittenden	1,627	46.53%	1,863	53.27%	7	0.20%	-236	-6.74%	3,497
Cumberland	1,348	42.60%	1,794	56.70%	22	0.70%	-446	-14.10%	3,164
Daviess	15,253	64.21%	8,350	35.15%	152	0.64%	6,903	29.06%	23,755
Edmonson	1,022	38.61%	1,603	60.56%	22	0.83%	-581	-21.95%	2,647
Elliott	2,026	86.18%	323	13.74%	2	0.09%	1,703	72.44%	2,351
Estill	2,105	51.32%	1,996	48.66%	1	0.02%	109	2.66%	4,102
Fayette	25,317	57.29%	18,739	42.40%	136	0.31%	6,578	14.89%	44,192
Fleming	2,678	61.53%	1,668	38.33%	6	0.14%	1,010	23.20%	4,352
Floyd	11,644	82.93%	2,352	16.75%	45	0.32%	9,292	66.18%	14,041
Franklin	10,130	81.08%	2,320	18.57%	44	0.35%	7,810	62.51%	12,494
Fulton	2,493	67.89%	1,169	31.84%	10	0.27%	1,324	36.05%	3,672
Gallatin	1,246	82.14%	267	17.60%	4	0.26%	979	64.54%	1,517
Garrard	2,092	53.16%	1,828	46.45%	15	0.38%	264	6.71%	3,935
Grant	2,461	69.42%	1,068	30.13%	16	0.45%	1,393	39.29%	3,545
Graves	9,958	80.37%	2,389	19.28%	43	0.35%	7,569	61.09%	12,390
Grayson	2,920	49.54%	2,974	50.46%	0	0.00%	-54	-0.92%	5,894
Green	2,160	50.40%	2,110	49.23%	16	0.37%	50	1.17%	4,286
Greenup	6,680	62.06%	4,045	37.58%	39	0.36%	2,635	24.48%	10,764
Hancock	1,423	64.98%	756	34.52%	11	0.50%	667	30.46%	2,190
Hardin	7,460	66.23%	3,744	33.24%	60	0.53%	3,716	32.99%	11,264
Harlan	9,394	69.96%	4,025	29.97%	9	0.07%	5,369	39.99%	13,428
Harrison	4,179	79.66%	1,054	20.09%	13	0.25%	3,125	59.57%	5,246
Hart	3,313	62.57%	1,961	37.03%	21	0.40%	1,352	25.54%	5,295
Henderson	8,022	74.38%	2,734	25.35%	29	0.27%	5,288	49.03%	10,785
Henry	3,521	80.70%	838	19.21%	4	0.09%	2,683	61.49%	4,363
Hickman	2,149	77.47%	613	22.10%	12	0.43%	1,536	55.37%	2,774
Hopkins	7,954	70.41%	3,328	29.46%	15	0.13%	4,626	40.95%	11,297
Jackson	920	25.58%	2,654	73.78%	23	0.64%	-1,734	-48.20%	3,597
Jefferson	146,023	64.09%	80,951	35.53%	849	0.37%	65,072	28.56%	227,823
Jessamine	2,485	54.86%	1,968	43.44%	77	1.70%	517	11.42%	4,530
Johnson	3,053	49.59%	3,075	49.94%	29	0.47%	-22	-0.35%	6,157
Kenton	23,103	59.55%	15,630	40.29%	62	0.16%	7,473	19.26%	38,795
Knott	4,739	90.61%	482	9.22%	9	0.17%	4,257	81.39%	5,230
Knox	4,150	53.41%	3,583	46.11%	37	0.48%	567	7.30%	7,770
LaRue	2,742	69.29%	1,195	30.20%	20	0.51%	1,547	39.09%	3,957
Laurel	3,633	41.93%	5,008	57.80%	24	0.28%	-1,375	-15.87%	8,665
Lawrence	2,703	60.67%	1,745	39.17%	7	0.16%	958	21.50%	4,455
Lee	1,376	54.11%	1,162	45.69%	5	0.20%	214	8.42%	2,543
Leslie	1,795	47.56%	1,971	52.23%	8	0.21%	-176	-4.67%	3,774
Letcher	5,420	67.22%	2,632	32.64%	11	0.14%	2,788	34.58%	8,063
Lewis	2,047	47.67%	2,230	51.93%	17	0.40%	-183	-4.26%	4,294
Lincoln	3,307	62.67%	1,958	37.10%	12	0.23%	1,349	25.57%	5,277
Livingston	2,147	72.07%	821	27.56%	11	0.37%	1,326	44.51%	2,979
Logan	6,234	73.39%	2,232	26.28%	28	0.33%	4,002	47.11%	8,494
Lyon	1,412	70.39%	583	29.06%	11	0.55%	829	41.33%	2,006
Madison	6,877	61.40%	4,266	38.09%	57	0.51%	2,611	23.31%	11,200
Magoffin	2,498	64.83%	1,327	34.44%	28	0.73%	1,171	30.39%	3,853
Marion	4,265	79.81%	1,074	20.10%	5	0.09%	3,191	59.71%	5,344
Marshall	5,968	77.83%	1,679	21.90%	21	0.27%	4,289	55.93%	7,668
Martin	1,694	51.24%	1,567	47.40%	45	1.36%	127	3.84%	3,306
Mason	4,502	64.76%	2,437	35.05%	13	0.19%	2,065	29.71%	6,952
McCracken	16,178	77.75%	4,543	21.83%	87	0.42%	11,635	55.92%	20,808
McCreary	1,428	38.77%	2,230	60.55%	25	0.68%	-802	-21.78%	3,683
McLean	2,576	68.60%	1,173	31.24%	6	0.16%	1,403	37.36%	3,755
Meade	3,076	74.37%	1,055	25.51%	5	0.12%	2,021	48.86%	4,136
Menifee	1,076	76.80%	318	22.70%	7	0.50%	758	54.10%	1,401
Mercer	3,564	67.03%	1,732	32.57%	21	0.39%	1,832	34.46%	5,317
Metcalfe	1,967	60.49%	1,277	39.27%	8	0.25%	690	21.22%	3,252
Monroe	1,713	34.19%	3,293	65.73%	4	0.08%	-1,580	-31.54%	5,010
Montgomery	3,039	66.31%	1,540	33.60%	4	0.09%	1,499	32.71%	4,583
Morgan	3,293	84.72%	546	14.05%	48	1.23%	2,747	70.67%	3,887
Muhlenberg	6,421	65.92%	3,300	33.88%	20	0.21%	3,121	32.04%	9,741
Nelson	5,586	76.56%	1,683	23.07%	27	0.37%	3,903	53.49%	7,296
Nicholas	1,742	73.25%	621	26.11%	15	0.63%	1,121	47.14%	2,378
Ohio	3,303	52.54%	2,979	47.38%	5	0.08%	324	5.16%	6,287
Oldham	2,622	67.51%	1,256	32.34%	6	0.15%	1,366	35.17%	3,884
Owen	2,980	87.93%	405	11.95%	4	0.12%	2,575	75.98%	3,389
Owsley	571	32.74%	1,167	66.92%	6	0.34%	-596	-34.18%	1,744
Pendleton	2,495	65.40%	1,313	34.42%	7	0.18%	1,182	30.98%	3,815
Perry	6,728	67.64%	3,211	32.28%	8	0.08%	3,517	35.36%	9,947
Pike	14,140	66.53%	7,078	33.30%	35	0.16%	7,062	33.23%	21,253
Powell	1,622	61.79%	993	37.83%	10	0.38%	629	23.96%	2,625
Pulaski	5,840	43.98%	7,383	55.60%	55	0.41%	-1,543	-11.62%	13,278
Robertson	734	65.59%	383	34.23%	2	0.18%	351	31.36%	1,119
Rockcastle	1,631	36.44%	2,829	63.20%	16	0.36%	-1,198	-26.76%	4,476
Rowan	2,824	64.24%	1,554	35.35%	18	0.41%	1,270	28.89%	4,396
Russell	1,729	40.46%	2,521	59.00%	23	0.54%	-792	-18.54%	4,273
Scott	3,289	70.90%	1,330	28.67%	20	0.43%	1,959	42.23%	4,639
Shelby	4,933	77.89%	1,384	21.85%	16	0.25%	3,549	56.04%	6,333
Simpson	3,168	76.45%	967	23.33%	9	0.22%	2,201	53.12%	4,144
Spencer	1,422	72.77%	525	26.87%	7	0.36%	897	45.90%	1,954
Taylor	3,082	53.98%	2,594	45.44%	33	0.58%	488	8.54%	5,709
Todd	2,738	66.93%	1,339	32.73%	14	0.34%	1,399	34.20%	4,091
Trigg	2,790	75.12%	912	24.56%	12	0.32%	1,878	50.56%	3,714
Trimble	1,881	86.36%	292	13.41%	5	0.23%	1,589	72.95%	2,178
Union	3,934	75.93%	1,220	23.55%	27	0.52%	2,714	52.38%	5,181
Warren	9,887	62.45%	5,915	37.36%	29	0.18%	3,972	25.09%	15,831
Washington	2,790	64.12%	1,561	35.88%	0	0.00%	1,229	28.24%	4,351
Wayne	2,737	53.21%	2,389	46.44%	18	0.35%	348	6.77%	5,144
Webster	3,741	75.36%	1,217	24.52%	6	0.12%	2,524	50.84%	4,964
Whitley	4,782	49.82%	4,779	49.79%	38	0.40%	3	0.03%	9,599
Wolfe	2,018	77.71%	562	21.64%	17	0.65%	1,456	56.07%	2,597
Woodford	2,974	70.59%	1,215	28.84%	24	0.57%	1,759	41.75%	4,213
Totals	669,659	64.01%	372,977	35.65%	3,469	0.33%	296,682	28.36%	1,046,105

==== Counties that flipped from Republican to Democratic ====
- Barren
- Boone
- Bell
- Boyd
- Boyle
- Bracken
- Breckinridge
- Bullitt
- Caldwell
- Campbell
- Clark
- Carter
- Daviess
- Estill
- Fayette
- Fleming
- Garrard
- Grant
- Green
- Greenup
- Hancock
- Hardin
- Hart
- Jefferson
- Jessamine
- Kenton
- Knox
- LaRue
- Lawrence
- Lee
- Letcher
- Lincoln
- Livingston
- Madison
- Magoffin
- Martin
- Mason
- McLean
- Metcalfe
- Mercer
- Muhlenberg
- Ohio
- Oldham
- Pendleton
- Powell
- Perry
- Rowan
- Spencer
- Taylor
- Warren
- Washington
- Woodford
- Wayne
- Whitley
