= 1932 United States presidential election in Kentucky =

- November 8, 1932

All 11 Kentucky votes to the Electoral College

Nominee	Franklin D. Roosevelt	Herbert Hoover
Party	Democratic	Republican
Home state	New York	California
Running mate	John Nance Garner	Charles Curtis
Electoral vote	11	0
Popular vote	580,574	394,716
Percentage	59.06%	40.15%
County results
Roosevelt
50–60%
60–70%
70–80%
80–90%
Hoover
40–50%
50–60%
60–70%
70–80%
80–90%
President before election
Herbert Hoover
Republican
Elected President
Franklin D. Roosevelt
Democratic

The 1932 United States presidential election in Kentucky took place on November 8, 1932, as part of the 1932 United States presidential election. Kentucky voters chose 11 representatives, or electors, to the Electoral College, who voted for president and vice president.

Kentucky was won by Governor Franklin D. Roosevelt (D–New York), running with Speaker John Nance Garner, with 59.06 percent of the popular vote, against incumbent President Herbert Hoover (R–California), running with Vice President Charles Curtis, with 40.15 percent of the popular vote. Roosevelt's victory was an almost exact reversal of Hoover's performance four years prior, when he had defeated Al Smith in the state by the same 18.9 point margin. As of the 2024 presidential election, this is the last occasion when Adair County and Grayson County voted for a Democratic presidential candidate.

== Results ==
1932 United States presidential election in Kentucky
Party	Candidate	Votes	%
Democratic	Franklin D. Roosevelt	580,574	59.06%
Republican	Herbert Hoover (inc.)	394,716	40.15%
Socialist	Norman Thomas	3,853	0.39%
Prohibition	William David Upshaw	2,252	0.23%
Socialist Labor	Verne L. Reynolds	1,396	0.14%
Communist	William Z. Foster	272	0.03%
Total votes		983,063	100%

=== Results by county ===
1932 United States presidential election in Kentucky by county
County	Franklin Delano Roosevelt Democratic		Herbert Clark Hoover Republican		Norman Mattoon Thomas Socialist		Various candidates Other parties		Margin		Total votes cast
County	#	%	#	%	#	%	#	%	#	%	Total votes cast
Adair	3,251	51.22%	3,084	48.59%	0	0.00%	12	0.19%	167	2.63%	6,347
Allen	3,116	48.93%	3,219	50.55%	7	0.11%	26	0.41%	-103	-1.62%	6,368
Anderson	2,415	66.46%	1,184	32.58%	5	0.14%	30	0.83%	1,231	33.87%	3,634
Ballard	3,987	86.98%	572	12.48%	11	0.24%	14	0.31%	3,415	74.50%	4,584
Barren	6,518	64.02%	3,622	35.58%	8	0.08%	33	0.32%	2,896	28.45%	10,181
Bath	2,909	64.57%	1,576	34.98%	5	0.11%	15	0.33%	1,333	29.59%	4,505
Bell	5,440	53.27%	4,695	45.97%	10	0.10%	68	0.67%	745	7.29%	10,213
Boone	3,536	71.83%	1,355	27.52%	20	0.41%	12	0.24%	2,181	44.30%	4,923
Bourbon	4,759	62.59%	2,820	37.09%	5	0.07%	20	0.26%	1,939	25.50%	7,604
Boyd	8,315	54.19%	6,853	44.67%	96	0.63%	79	0.51%	1,462	9.53%	15,343
Boyle	4,473	66.65%	2,208	32.90%	4	0.06%	26	0.39%	2,265	33.75%	6,711
Bracken	2,407	61.39%	1,471	37.52%	21	0.54%	22	0.56%	936	23.87%	3,921
Breathitt	4,524	76.65%	1,371	23.23%	2	0.03%	5	0.08%	3,153	53.42%	5,902
Breckinridge	3,814	53.83%	3,237	45.69%	4	0.06%	30	0.42%	577	8.14%	7,085
Bullitt	2,918	72.70%	1,088	27.11%	2	0.05%	6	0.15%	1,830	45.59%	4,014
Butler	1,736	40.08%	2,586	59.71%	4	0.09%	5	0.12%	-850	-19.63%	4,331
Caldwell	2,971	58.96%	2,020	40.09%	18	0.36%	30	0.60%	951	18.87%	5,039
Calloway	6,335	88.18%	813	11.32%	12	0.17%	24	0.33%	5,522	76.87%	7,184
Campbell	17,776	58.85%	11,665	38.62%	589	1.95%	178	0.59%	6,111	20.23%	30,208
Carlisle	2,840	87.30%	402	12.36%	3	0.09%	8	0.25%	2,438	74.95%	3,253
Carroll	3,015	79.45%	761	20.05%	4	0.11%	15	0.40%	2,254	59.39%	3,795
Carter	4,565	50.61%	4,376	48.51%	27	0.30%	52	0.58%	189	2.10%	9,020
Casey	2,651	40.68%	3,840	58.93%	2	0.03%	23	0.35%	-1,189	-18.25%	6,516
Christian	7,618	58.96%	5,235	40.52%	29	0.22%	38	0.29%	2,383	18.44%	12,920
Clark	4,920	70.93%	1,981	28.56%	11	0.16%	24	0.35%	2,939	42.37%	6,936
Clay	2,133	37.95%	3,474	61.81%	3	0.05%	10	0.18%	-1,341	-23.86%	5,620
Clinton	908	27.27%	2,422	72.73%	0	0.00%	0	0.00%	-1,514	-45.47%	3,330
Crittenden	2,119	49.05%	2,185	50.58%	3	0.07%	13	0.30%	-66	-1.53%	4,320
Cumberland	1,235	34.16%	2,369	65.53%	0	0.00%	11	0.30%	-1,134	-31.37%	3,615
Daviess	10,527	67.12%	5,059	32.25%	22	0.14%	77	0.49%	5,468	34.86%	15,685
Edmonson	1,796	39.92%	2,690	59.79%	4	0.09%	9	0.20%	-894	-19.87%	4,499
Elliott	2,150	84.91%	382	15.09%	0	0.00%	0	0.00%	1,768	69.83%	2,532
Estill	3,150	51.34%	2,963	48.29%	0	0.00%	23	0.37%	187	3.05%	6,136
Fayette	15,765	56.57%	11,847	42.51%	163	0.58%	94	0.34%	3,918	14.06%	27,869
Fleming	3,442	56.21%	2,638	43.08%	8	0.13%	36	0.59%	804	13.13%	6,124
Floyd	8,537	71.22%	3,415	28.49%	18	0.15%	16	0.13%	5,122	42.73%	11,986
Franklin	6,331	75.33%	2,034	24.20%	21	0.25%	18	0.21%	4,297	51.13%	8,404
Fulton	3,985	82.25%	837	17.28%	4	0.08%	19	0.39%	3,148	64.97%	4,845
Gallatin	1,792	82.85%	365	16.87%	0	0.00%	6	0.28%	1,427	65.97%	2,163
Garrard	2,582	53.14%	2,276	46.84%	0	0.00%	1	0.02%	306	6.30%	4,859
Grant	3,148	68.55%	1,407	30.64%	7	0.15%	30	0.65%	1,741	37.91%	4,592
Graves	9,888	84.05%	1,825	15.51%	26	0.22%	25	0.21%	8,063	68.54%	11,764
Grayson	3,872	50.79%	3,721	48.81%	5	0.07%	26	0.34%	151	1.98%	7,624
Green	2,277	49.68%	2,281	49.77%	2	0.04%	23	0.50%	-4	-0.09%	4,583
Greenup	4,963	58.44%	3,422	40.30%	62	0.73%	45	0.53%	1,541	18.15%	8,492
Hancock	1,623	57.43%	1,174	41.54%	7	0.25%	22	0.78%	449	15.89%	2,826
Hardin	6,047	67.79%	2,801	31.40%	32	0.36%	40	0.45%	3,246	36.39%	8,920
Harlan	9,091	44.88%	11,118	54.89%	23	0.11%	22	0.11%	-2,027	-10.01%	20,254
Harrison	4,909	72.30%	1,833	27.00%	12	0.18%	36	0.53%	3,076	45.30%	6,790
Hart	4,008	60.34%	2,601	39.16%	12	0.18%	21	0.32%	1,407	21.18%	6,642
Henderson	6,100	68.69%	2,485	27.98%	226	2.54%	70	0.79%	3,615	40.70%	8,881
Henry	4,303	71.87%	1,643	27.44%	4	0.07%	37	0.62%	2,660	44.43%	5,987
Hickman	3,327	87.81%	446	11.77%	2	0.05%	14	0.37%	2,881	76.04%	3,789
Hopkins	9,158	69.99%	3,817	29.17%	34	0.26%	76	0.58%	5,341	40.82%	13,085
Jackson	529	15.49%	2,879	84.28%	3	0.09%	5	0.15%	-2,350	-68.79%	3,416
Jefferson	72,402	51.31%	67,137	47.58%	964	0.68%	593	0.42%	5,265	3.73%	141,096
Jessamine	2,873	62.52%	1,710	37.21%	0	0.00%	12	0.26%	1,163	25.31%	4,595
Johnson	3,134	39.05%	4,871	60.70%	11	0.14%	9	0.11%	-1,737	-21.64%	8,025
Kenton	22,311	65.12%	11,202	32.69%	572	1.67%	178	0.52%	11,109	32.42%	34,263
Knott	4,443	85.61%	747	14.39%	0	0.00%	0	0.00%	3,696	71.21%	5,190
Knox	3,375	42.52%	4,513	56.85%	9	0.11%	41	0.52%	-1,138	-14.34%	7,938
Larue	2,650	67.97%	1,235	31.67%	2	0.05%	12	0.31%	1,415	36.29%	3,899
Laurel	3,569	42.34%	4,827	57.26%	16	0.19%	18	0.21%	-1,258	-14.92%	8,430
Lawrence	3,701	56.99%	2,766	42.59%	2	0.03%	25	0.38%	935	14.40%	6,494
Lee	1,970	54.66%	1,628	45.17%	1	0.03%	5	0.14%	342	9.49%	3,604
Leslie	569	16.80%	2,810	82.96%	2	0.06%	6	0.18%	-2,241	-66.16%	3,387
Letcher	5,190	52.03%	4,732	47.44%	14	0.14%	39	0.39%	458	4.59%	9,975
Lewis	2,488	43.28%	3,212	55.88%	13	0.23%	35	0.61%	-724	-12.60%	5,748
Lincoln	4,574	59.44%	3,063	39.81%	10	0.13%	48	0.62%	1,511	19.64%	7,695
Livingston	2,231	67.36%	1,070	32.31%	3	0.09%	8	0.24%	1,161	35.05%	3,312
Logan	7,072	71.31%	2,778	28.01%	8	0.08%	59	0.59%	4,294	43.30%	9,917
Lyon	2,099	70.46%	873	29.31%	0	0.00%	7	0.23%	1,226	41.15%	2,979
Madison	6,957	54.00%	5,811	45.10%	77	0.60%	39	0.30%	1,146	8.89%	12,884
Magoffin	2,721	50.44%	2,661	49.32%	2	0.04%	11	0.20%	60	1.11%	5,395
Marion	4,427	73.53%	1,571	26.09%	5	0.08%	18	0.30%	2,856	47.43%	6,021
Marshall	4,246	82.78%	863	16.83%	10	0.19%	10	0.19%	3,383	65.96%	5,129
Martin	770	30.09%	1,774	69.32%	4	0.16%	11	0.43%	-1,004	-39.23%	2,559
Mason	5,065	60.78%	3,213	38.55%	9	0.11%	47	0.56%	1,852	22.22%	8,334
McCracken	9,188	73.51%	3,140	25.12%	100	0.80%	71	0.57%	6,048	48.39%	12,499
McCreary	1,194	26.09%	3,360	73.43%	11	0.24%	11	0.24%	-2,166	-47.33%	4,576
McLean	2,771	65.60%	1,412	33.43%	22	0.52%	19	0.45%	1,359	32.17%	4,224
Meade	2,488	69.81%	1,050	29.46%	13	0.36%	13	0.36%	1,438	40.35%	3,564
Menifee	1,425	74.61%	474	24.82%	4	0.21%	7	0.37%	951	49.79%	1,910
Mercer	3,759	65.43%	1,950	33.94%	3	0.05%	33	0.57%	1,809	31.49%	5,745
Metcalfe	1,985	53.22%	1,729	46.35%	1	0.03%	15	0.40%	256	6.86%	3,730
Monroe	1,620	38.66%	2,559	61.07%	2	0.05%	9	0.21%	-939	-22.41%	4,190
Montgomery	2,810	64.78%	1,515	34.92%	3	0.07%	10	0.23%	1,295	29.85%	4,338
Morgan	4,137	74.09%	1,435	25.70%	1	0.02%	11	0.20%	2,702	48.39%	5,584
Muhlenberg	7,162	61.58%	4,349	37.39%	59	0.51%	60	0.52%	2,813	24.19%	11,630
Nelson	5,272	71.23%	2,100	28.37%	2	0.03%	27	0.36%	3,172	42.86%	7,401
Nicholas	2,728	68.41%	1,219	30.57%	0	0.00%	41	1.03%	1,509	37.84%	3,988
Ohio	4,870	49.02%	4,880	49.12%	111	1.12%	73	0.73%	-10	-0.10%	9,934
Oldham	2,319	71.73%	888	27.47%	12	0.37%	14	0.43%	1,431	44.26%	3,233
Owen	4,240	85.48%	658	13.27%	2	0.04%	60	1.21%	3,582	72.22%	4,960
Owsley	520	20.72%	1,985	79.08%	1	0.04%	4	0.16%	-1,465	-58.37%	2,510
Pendleton	2,745	59.42%	1,812	39.22%	8	0.17%	55	1.19%	933	20.19%	4,620
Perry	6,393	54.85%	5,240	44.96%	11	0.09%	11	0.09%	1,153	9.89%	11,655
Pike	12,686	61.36%	7,914	38.28%	29	0.14%	45	0.22%	4,772	23.08%	20,674
Powell	1,300	60.89%	826	38.69%	0	0.00%	9	0.42%	474	22.20%	2,135
Pulaski	4,931	41.57%	6,905	58.22%	7	0.06%	18	0.15%	-1,974	-16.64%	11,861
Robertson	1,056	65.84%	538	33.54%	0	0.00%	10	0.62%	518	32.29%	1,604
Rockcastle	1,976	35.51%	3,577	64.29%	3	0.05%	8	0.14%	-1,601	-28.77%	5,564
Rowan	2,844	63.34%	1,622	36.12%	12	0.27%	12	0.27%	1,222	27.22%	4,490
Russell	1,699	40.30%	2,490	59.06%	1	0.02%	26	0.62%	-791	-18.76%	4,216
Scott	4,572	69.79%	1,943	29.66%	8	0.12%	28	0.43%	2,629	40.13%	6,551
Shelby	5,180	70.72%	2,108	28.78%	4	0.05%	33	0.45%	3,072	41.94%	7,325
Simpson	3,603	74.64%	1,203	24.92%	2	0.04%	19	0.39%	2,400	49.72%	4,827
Spencer	1,773	70.50%	736	29.26%	1	0.04%	5	0.20%	1,037	41.23%	2,515
Taylor	2,823	51.76%	2,592	47.52%	0	0.00%	39	0.72%	231	4.24%	5,454
Todd	3,966	71.38%	1,562	28.11%	7	0.13%	21	0.38%	2,404	43.27%	5,556
Trigg	3,611	71.11%	1,452	28.59%	9	0.18%	6	0.12%	2,159	42.52%	5,078
Trimble	2,083	88.49%	257	10.92%	2	0.08%	12	0.51%	1,826	77.57%	2,354
Union	4,892	81.66%	1,063	17.74%	10	0.17%	26	0.43%	3,829	63.91%	5,991
Warren	8,932	65.78%	4,569	33.65%	24	0.18%	53	0.39%	4,363	32.13%	13,578
Washington	2,841	54.60%	2,340	44.97%	3	0.06%	19	0.37%	501	9.63%	5,203
Wayne	2,929	51.88%	2,682	47.50%	4	0.07%	31	0.55%	247	4.37%	5,646
Webster	4,833	67.71%	2,257	31.62%	9	0.13%	39	0.55%	2,576	36.09%	7,138
Whitley	3,576	36.42%	6,186	62.99%	14	0.14%	44	0.45%	-2,610	-26.58%	9,820
Wolfe	2,321	71.81%	909	28.13%	0	0.00%	2	0.06%	1,412	43.69%	3,232
Woodford	3,180	64.66%	1,720	34.97%	7	0.14%	11	0.22%	1,460	29.69%	4,918
Totals	580,574	59.06%	394,716	40.15%	3,858	0.39%	3,911	0.40%	185,858	18.91%	983,059

==== Counties that flipped from Republican to Democratic ====
- Adair
- Anderson
- Barren
- Boone
- Bath
- Bell
- Bourbon
- Boyd
- Boyle
- Bracken
- Breckinridge
- Bullitt
- Campbell
- Caldwell
- Carter
- Clark
- Christian
- Daviess
- Estill
- Fayette
- Fleming
- Gallatin
- Garrard
- Grant
- Grayson
- Greenup
- Hancock
- Hardin
- Hart
- Henderson
- Jefferson
- Jessamine
- Kenton
- Larue
- Lawrence
- Lee
- Letcher
- Livingston
- Lincoln
- Logan
- Lyon
- Madison
- Magoffin
- Mason
- McCracken
- McLean
- Menifee
- Mercer
- Metcalfe
- Muhlenberg
- Montgomery
- Nicholas
- Oldham
- Pendleton
- Perry
- Pike
- Pulaski
- Robertson
- Rowan
- Scott
- Spencer
- Shelby
- Taylor
- Todd
- Trigg
- Warren
- Wayne
- Washington
- Woodford
