= 1960 United States presidential election in Kentucky =

- November 8, 1960

Nominee	Richard Nixon	John F. Kennedy
Party	Republican	Democratic
Home state	California	Massachusetts
Running mate	Henry Cabot Lodge Jr.	Lyndon B. Johnson
Electoral vote	10	0
Popular vote	602,607	521,855
Percentage	53.59%	46.41%
County results
Nixon
50–60%
60–70%
70–80%
80–90%
90–100%
Kennedy
50–60%
60–70%
70–80%
President before election
Dwight D. Eisenhower
Republican
Elected President
John F. Kennedy
Democratic

The 1960 United States presidential election in Kentucky took place on November 8, 1960, as part of the 1960 United States presidential election. Kentucky voters chose 10 representatives, or electors, to the Electoral College, who voted for president and vice president.

Kentucky was won by incumbent Vice President Richard Nixon (R–California), running with United States Ambassador to the United Nations Henry Cabot Lodge Jr., with 53.59 percent of the popular vote, against Senator John F. Kennedy (D–Massachusetts), running with Senator Lyndon B. Johnson, with 46.41 percent of the popular vote. Kentucky was the only state to vote for Stevenson in either 1952 or 1956 and Nixon in 1960. Nixon thus became the first Republican to ever carry Kentucky without winning the presidency, and remained the last until John McCain did so in 2008. Kennedy was the first Democrat to win without the state since 1852.

== Results ==
1960 United States presidential election in Kentucky
Party	Candidate	Votes	%
Republican	Richard Nixon	602,607	53.59%
Democratic	John F. Kennedy	521,855	46.41%
Total votes		1,124,462	100%

=== Results by county ===
County	Richard Nixon Republican		John F. Kennedy Democratic		Margin		Total votes cast
County	#	%	#	%	#	%	Total votes cast
Adair	4,621	67.07%	2,269	32.93%	2,352	34.14%	6,890
Allen	3,410	67.22%	1,663	32.78%	1,747	34.44%	5,073
Anderson	2,033	49.94%	2,038	50.06%	-5	-0.12%	4,071
Ballard	1,121	28.99%	2,746	71.01%	-1,625	-42.02%	3,867
Barren	5,187	51.19%	4,946	48.81%	241	2.38%	10,133
Bath	1,888	47.75%	2,066	52.25%	-178	-4.50%	3,954
Bell	6,805	56.77%	5,181	43.23%	1,624	13.54%	11,986
Boone	4,835	61.99%	2,965	38.01%	1,870	23.98%	7,800
Bourbon	2,379	42.98%	3,156	57.02%	-777	-14.04%	5,535
Boyd	11,305	55.42%	9,094	44.58%	2,211	10.84%	20,399
Boyle	3,624	52.28%	3,308	47.72%	316	4.56%	6,932
Bracken	2,002	60.16%	1,326	39.84%	676	20.32%	3,328
Breathitt	1,996	37.64%	3,307	62.36%	-1,311	-24.72%	5,303
Breckinridge	3,979	55.92%	3,136	44.08%	843	11.84%	7,115
Bullitt	2,683	52.40%	2,437	47.60%	246	4.80%	5,120
Butler	3,656	78.66%	992	21.34%	2,664	57.32%	4,648
Caldwell	3,442	61.70%	2,137	38.30%	1,305	23.40%	5,579
Calloway	3,356	41.69%	4,693	58.31%	-1,337	-16.62%	8,049
Campbell	17,388	54.21%	14,690	45.79%	2,698	8.42%	32,078
Carlisle	978	35.59%	1,770	64.41%	-792	-28.82%	2,748
Carroll	1,135	33.78%	2,225	66.22%	-1,090	-32.44%	3,360
Carter	4,956	58.76%	3,479	41.24%	1,477	17.52%	8,435
Casey	4,811	77.30%	1,413	22.70%	3,398	54.60%	6,224
Christian	5,251	43.31%	6,874	56.69%	-1,623	-13.38%	12,125
Clark	3,317	52.31%	3,024	47.69%	293	4.62%	6,341
Clay	4,922	78.09%	1,381	21.91%	3,541	56.18%	6,303
Clinton	3,524	84.11%	666	15.89%	2,858	68.22%	4,190
Crittenden	2,770	67.74%	1,319	32.26%	1,451	35.48%	4,089
Cumberland	2,697	76.25%	840	23.75%	1,857	52.50%	3,537
Daviess	13,385	57.62%	9,846	42.38%	3,539	15.24%	23,231
Edmonson	2,884	72.83%	1,076	27.17%	1,808	45.66%	3,960
Elliott	789	31.27%	1,734	68.73%	-945	-37.46%	2,523
Estill	3,238	64.85%	1,755	35.15%	1,483	29.70%	4,993
Fayette	25,169	60.43%	16,478	39.57%	8,691	20.86%	41,647
Fleming	2,777	55.62%	2,216	44.38%	561	11.24%	4,993
Floyd	5,010	33.66%	9,876	66.34%	-4,866	-32.68%	14,886
Franklin	4,742	40.21%	7,052	59.79%	-2,310	-19.58%	11,794
Fulton	1,567	36.65%	2,708	63.35%	-1,141	-26.70%	4,275
Gallatin	756	42.38%	1,028	57.62%	-272	-15.24%	1,784
Garrard	2,759	60.78%	1,780	39.22%	979	21.56%	4,539
Grant	2,163	53.25%	1,899	46.75%	264	6.50%	4,062
Graves	4,854	38.70%	7,689	61.30%	-2,835	-22.60%	12,543
Grayson	4,807	67.12%	2,355	32.88%	2,452	34.24%	7,162
Green	3,606	69.53%	1,580	30.47%	2,026	39.06%	5,186
Greenup	6,101	53.77%	5,245	46.23%	856	7.54%	11,346
Hancock	1,488	59.38%	1,018	40.62%	470	18.76%	2,506
Hardin	6,191	54.63%	5,141	45.37%	1,050	9.26%	11,332
Harlan	7,485	44.83%	9,211	55.17%	-1,726	-10.34%	16,696
Harrison	2,306	39.85%	3,481	60.15%	-1,175	-20.30%	5,787
Hart	3,610	53.57%	3,129	46.43%	481	7.14%	6,739
Henderson	5,302	48.79%	5,565	51.21%	-263	-2.42%	10,867
Henry	1,714	36.60%	2,969	63.40%	-1,255	-26.80%	4,683
Hickman	968	30.79%	2,176	69.21%	-1,208	-38.42%	3,144
Hopkins	5,574	46.41%	6,436	53.59%	-862	-7.18%	12,010
Jackson	3,923	90.35%	419	9.65%	3,504	80.70%	4,342
Jefferson	118,575	50.30%	117,180	49.70%	1,395	0.60%	235,755
Jessamine	2,787	57.95%	2,022	42.05%	765	15.90%	4,809
Johnson	5,317	66.97%	2,622	33.03%	2,695	33.94%	7,939
Kenton	21,857	52.89%	19,466	47.11%	2,391	5.78%	41,323
Knott	1,412	26.30%	3,957	73.70%	-2,545	-47.40%	5,369
Knox	5,814	66.29%	2,956	33.71%	2,858	32.58%	8,770
LaRue	2,668	60.90%	1,713	39.10%	955	21.80%	4,381
Laurel	7,485	76.42%	2,309	23.58%	5,176	52.84%	9,794
Lawrence	3,030	54.69%	2,510	45.31%	520	9.38%	5,540
Lee	2,012	67.74%	958	32.26%	1,054	35.48%	2,970
Leslie	3,894	83.05%	795	16.95%	3,099	66.10%	4,689
Letcher	4,408	50.87%	4,258	49.13%	150	1.74%	8,666
Lewis	3,816	69.41%	1,682	30.59%	2,134	38.82%	5,498
Lincoln	3,747	61.15%	2,381	38.85%	1,366	22.30%	6,128
Livingston	1,639	51.92%	1,518	48.08%	121	3.84%	3,157
Logan	4,117	46.59%	4,719	53.41%	-602	-6.82%	8,836
Lyon	1,024	42.61%	1,379	57.39%	-355	-14.78%	2,403
Madison	6,692	54.35%	5,621	45.65%	1,071	8.70%	12,313
Magoffin	2,736	52.54%	2,471	47.46%	265	5.08%	5,207
Marion	2,203	33.92%	4,292	66.08%	-2,089	-32.16%	6,495
Marshall	3,388	49.30%	3,484	50.70%	-96	-1.40%	6,872
Martin	2,809	71.57%	1,116	28.43%	1,693	43.14%	3,925
Mason	4,334	57.89%	3,153	42.11%	1,181	15.78%	7,487
McCracken	9,689	43.59%	12,539	56.41%	-2,850	-12.82%	22,228
McCreary	3,671	79.89%	924	20.11%	2,747	59.78%	4,595
McLean	2,269	56.94%	1,716	43.06%	553	13.88%	3,985
Meade	1,826	43.36%	2,385	56.64%	-559	-13.28%	4,211
Menifee	817	45.24%	989	54.76%	-172	-9.52%	1,806
Mercer	3,569	56.81%	2,713	43.19%	856	13.62%	6,282
Metcalfe	2,146	58.02%	1,553	41.98%	593	16.04%	3,699
Monroe	4,337	81.72%	970	18.28%	3,367	63.44%	5,307
Montgomery	2,451	48.25%	2,629	51.75%	-178	-3.50%	5,080
Morgan	1,718	37.12%	2,910	62.88%	-1,192	-25.76%	4,628
Muhlenberg	5,968	57.41%	4,427	42.59%	1,541	14.82%	10,395
Nelson	3,021	39.06%	4,713	60.94%	-1,692	-21.88%	7,734
Nicholas	1,058	42.10%	1,455	57.90%	-397	-15.80%	2,513
Ohio	5,230	68.37%	2,420	31.63%	2,810	36.74%	7,650
Oldham	2,221	53.12%	1,960	46.88%	261	6.24%	4,181
Owen	1,212	33.13%	2,446	66.87%	-1,234	-33.74%	3,658
Owsley	2,169	86.24%	346	13.76%	1,823	72.48%	2,515
Pendleton	2,387	61.46%	1,497	38.54%	890	22.92%	3,884
Perry	5,754	53.65%	4,971	46.35%	783	7.30%	10,725
Pike	9,956	43.30%	13,039	56.70%	-3,083	-13.40%	22,995
Powell	1,508	57.34%	1,122	42.66%	386	14.68%	2,630
Pulaski	11,899	79.35%	3,097	20.65%	8,802	58.70%	14,996
Robertson	594	47.67%	652	52.33%	-58	-4.66%	1,246
Rockcastle	3,982	77.73%	1,141	22.27%	2,841	55.46%	5,123
Rowan	2,558	51.47%	2,412	48.53%	146	2.94%	4,970
Russell	3,636	74.72%	1,230	25.28%	2,406	49.44%	4,866
Scott	2,200	45.85%	2,598	54.15%	-398	-8.30%	4,798
Shelby	2,934	43.43%	3,822	56.57%	-888	-13.14%	6,756
Simpson	1,927	42.18%	2,642	57.82%	-715	-15.64%	4,569
Spencer	1,134	51.97%	1,048	48.03%	86	3.94%	2,182
Taylor	4,669	68.11%	2,186	31.89%	2,483	36.22%	6,855
Todd	1,846	39.50%	2,827	60.50%	-981	-21.00%	4,673
Trigg	1,500	38.35%	2,411	61.65%	-911	-23.30%	3,911
Trimble	743	31.89%	1,587	68.11%	-844	-36.22%	2,330
Union	1,789	34.10%	3,457	65.90%	-1,668	-31.80%	5,246
Warren	9,074	54.89%	7,457	45.11%	1,617	9.78%	16,531
Washington	2,632	52.40%	2,391	47.60%	241	4.80%	5,023
Wayne	3,973	66.92%	1,964	33.08%	2,009	33.84%	5,937
Webster	2,498	44.00%	3,179	56.00%	-681	-12.00%	5,677
Whitley	7,553	71.84%	2,961	28.16%	4,592	43.68%	10,514
Wolfe	1,259	44.76%	1,554	55.24%	-295	-10.48%	2,813
Woodford	2,227	53.32%	1,950	46.68%	277	6.64%	4,177
Totals	602,607	53.59%	521,855	46.41%	80,752	7.18%	1,124,462

==== Counties that flipped from Democratic to Republican ====
- Barren
- Boyle
- Bullitt
- Clark
- Grant
- Livingston
- McLean
- Powell
- Spencer

==== Counties that flipped from Republican to Democratic ====
- Harlan
- Marion
- Nelson
- Pike
