= Glencoe, Kentucky =

- City
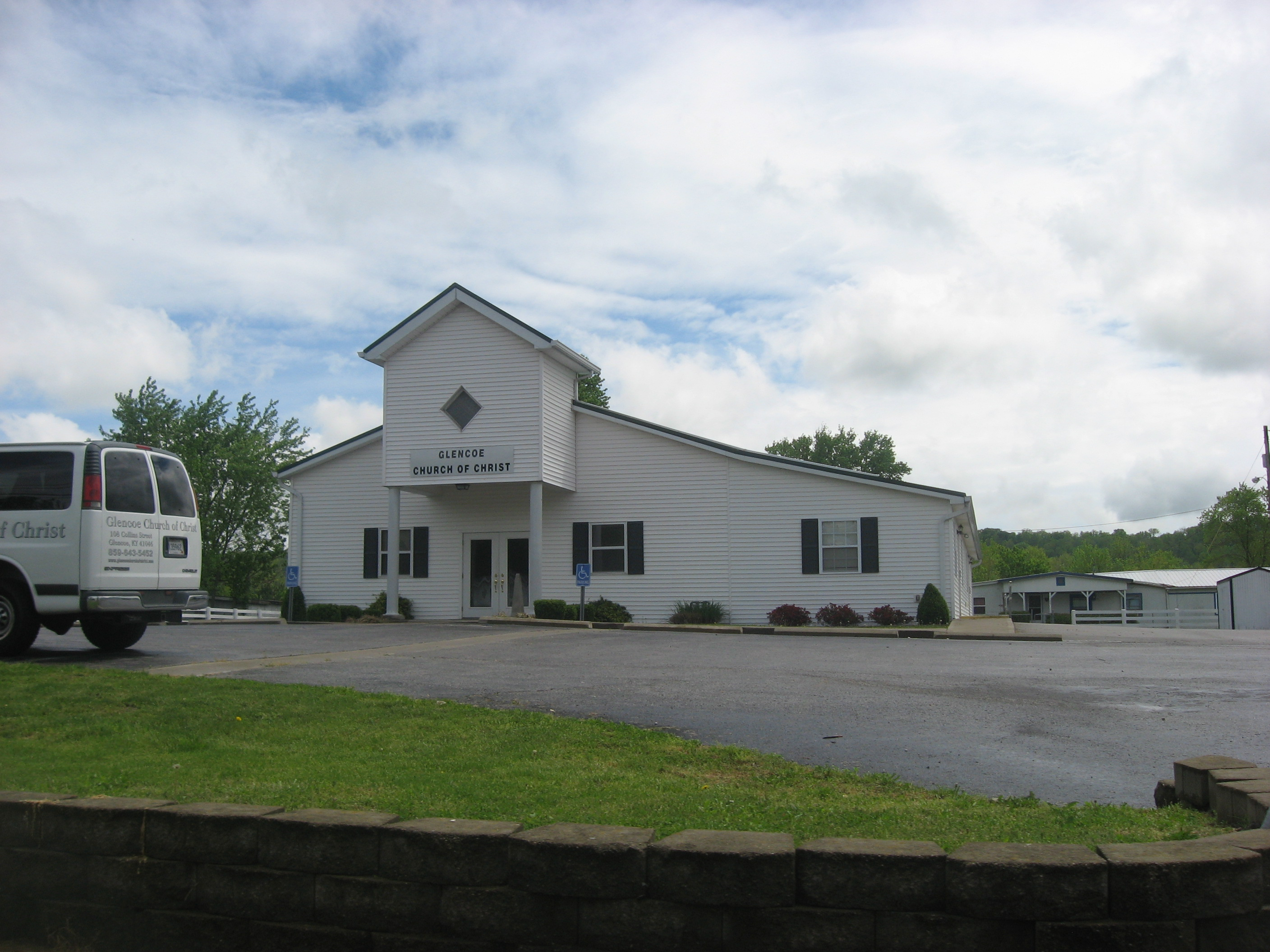
- Glencoe Church of Christ

- Location of Glencoe in Gallatin County, Kentucky.
- Coordinates: 38°43′31″N 84°49′26″W
- Country: United States
- State: Kentucky
- County: Gallatin
- Named for: Glen Coe valley in Scotland

Area
  - Total: 1.78 sq mi (4.60 km^{2})
  - Land: 1.76 sq mi (4.57 km^{2})
  - Water: 0.012 sq mi (0.03 km^{2})
- Elevation: 764 ft (233 m)

Population (2020)
  - Total: 350
  - Density: 198.4/sq mi (76.62/km^{2})
- Time zone: UTC-5 (Eastern (EST))
  - Summer (DST): UTC-4 (EDT)
- ZIP code: 41046
- Area code: 859
- FIPS code: 21-31204
- GNIS feature ID: 2403702

Glencoe is a home rule-class city in Gallatin County, Kentucky, in the United States. As of the 2020 census, Glencoe had a population of 350.

== History ==
A post office was established in the community in 1848 and named for Glen Coe in Scotland, the site of the Massacre of Glencoe. It was formally incorporated by the state assembly in 1960.

== Geography ==
Glencoe is located in southeastern Gallatin County in the valley of Eagle Creek. The creek forms part of the southern boundary of the city and also is the Owen County line. U.S. Route 127 passes through the city, leading south 43 miles (69 km) to Frankfort, the state capital. Kentucky Route 467 crosses US 127 in the center of Glencoe, leading east 15 miles (24 km) to Dry Ridge and west 5 miles (8 km) to Sparta. The Glencoe city limits extend north from the center of town 2 miles (3 km) along US 127 to Exit 62 on Interstate 71. From this point, I-71 leads northeast 33 miles (53 km) to Covington and southwest 64 miles (103 km) to Louisville.

According to the United States Census Bureau, the city has a total area of 1.8 square miles (4.6 km^{2}), of which 0.01 square miles (0.03 km^{2}), or 0.65%, is water. Eagle Creek, which forms the southern edge of town, is a west-flowing tributary of the Kentucky River and part of the Ohio River watershed.

== Demographics ==
Historical population
Census	Pop.	Note	%±
1880	181		—
1900	226		—
1910	237		4.9%
1970	250		—
1980	354		41.6%
1990	257		−27.4%
2000	251		−2.3%
2010	360		43.4%
2020	350		−2.8%
U.S. Decennial Census

As of the census of 2000, there were 251 people, 99 households, and 70 families residing in the city. The population density was 909.7 inhabitants per square mile (351.2/km^{2}). There were 110 housing units at an average density of 398.7 per square mile (153.9/km^{2}). The racial makeup of the city was 96.41% White, 0.40% African American, 1.20% Native American, 0.40% Asian, and 1.59% from two or more races.

There were 99 households, out of which 36.4% had children under the age of 18 living with them, 51.5% were married couples living together, 13.1% had a female householder with no husband present, and 28.3% were non-families. 24.2% of all households were made up of individuals, and 9.1% had someone living alone who was 65 years of age or older. The average household size was 2.54 and the average family size was 3.03.

In the city, the population was spread out, with 25.9% under the age of 18, 8.8% from 18 to 24, 30.3% from 25 to 44, 18.3% from 45 to 64, and 16.7% who were 65 years of age or older. The median age was 36 years. For every 100 females, there were 102.4 males. For every 100 females age 18 and over, there were 100.0 males.

The median income for a household in the city was $38,750, and the median income for a family was $49,375. Males had a median income of $36,563 versus $21,875 for females. The per capita income for the city was $16,053. About 7.9% of families and 7.5% of the population were below the poverty line, including 6.3% of those under the age of eighteen and 6.9% of those 65 or over.
