= Ghent, Kentucky =

- City
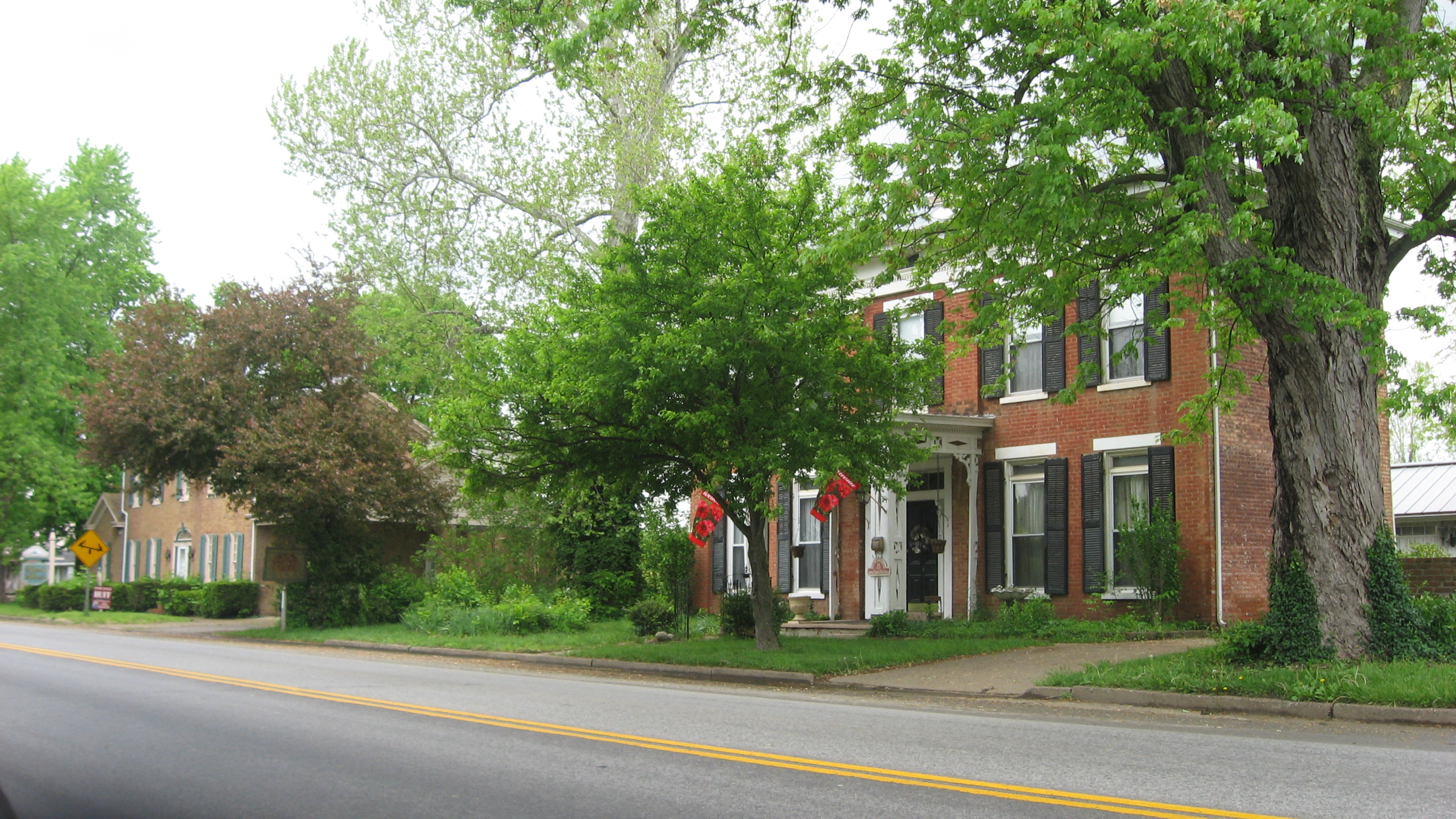

- Location of Ghent in Carroll County, Kentucky.

- Location of Ghent in Kentucky Ghent (the United States)
- Coordinates: 38°44′02″N 85°03′41″W
- Country: United States
- State: Kentucky
- County: Carroll
- Named for: Treaty of Ghent

Area
  - Total: 0.72 sq mi (1.86 km^{2})
  - Land: 0.71 sq mi (1.84 km^{2})
  - Water: 0.0039 sq mi (0.01 km^{2})
- Elevation: 482 ft (147 m)

Population (2020)
  - Total: 363
  - Density: 510.4/sq mi (197.08/km^{2})
- Time zone: UTC-5 (Eastern (EST))
  - Summer (DST): UTC-4 (EDT)
- ZIP code: 41045
- Area code: 502
- FIPS code: 21-30808
- GNIS feature ID: 2403694

Ghent is a home rule-class city along the south bank of the Ohio River in Carroll County, Kentucky, in the United States. As of the 2020 census, Ghent had a population of 363.

== Geography ==
Ghent is located in northeastern Carroll County along the Ohio River. According to the United States Census Bureau, the city has a total area of 0.73 square miles (1.9 km^{2}), all land. The community is located on U.S. Route 42 at Kentucky Route 47. Ghent is north of Interstate 71.

Ghent is on the opposite side of the Ohio River from Vevay, Indiana, but the towns are not linked by a bridge. Ferry service between these two river cities spanned 175 years from 1802 to 1977.

== History ==
Ghent was settled at the end of eighteenth century and was first known as McCool's Creek Settlement. The town was laid out in 1814. Henry Clay is alleged to have suggested the name, derived from the city of Ghent (then part of the Netherlands and now part of Belgium), where the treaty ending the War of 1812 was signed between the United States and the United Kingdom on Christmas Eve, 1814. Ghent's post office opened in 1816. On January 17, 1839, the Kentucky General Assembly formally established the city of Ghent and appointed Theodoric Fisher, Samuel Sanders Jr., James Knox, John C. Lindsey, and Richard Sarlls as its trustees.

In August 1864, in a skirmish during the Civil War in what was known as the Gex Landing Incident, members of the African-American United States Colored Troops and the United States Colored Cavalry engaged with CSA troops seeking to rescue local resident James Southard, a ferryman and Confederate sympathizer who had been arrested. USCT soldiers suffered an undetermined number of casualties.

== Demographics ==
Historical population
Census	Pop.	Note	%±
1860	366		—
1870	464		26.8%
1880	387		−16.6%
1890	525		35.7%
1900	569		8.4%
1910	421		−26.0%
1920	438		4.0%
1930	383		−12.6%
1940	414		8.1%
1950	368		−11.1%
1960	342		−7.1%
1970	385		12.6%
1980	439		14.0%
1990	365		−16.9%
2000	371		1.6%
2010	323		−12.9%
2020	363		12.4%
U.S. Decennial Census

As of the census of 2000, there were 371 people, 125 households, and 103 families residing in the city. The population density was 517.4 inhabitants per square mile (199.8/km^{2}). There were 152 housing units at an average density of 212.0 per square mile (81.9/km^{2}). The racial makeup of the city was 89.49% White, 5.93% African American, 3.50% from other races, and 1.08% from two or more races. Hispanic or Latino of any race were 6.20% of the population.

There were 125 households, out of which 36.0% had children under the age of 18 living with them, 56.8% were married couples living together, 15.2% had a female householder with no husband present, and 17.6% were non-families. 14.4% of all households were made up of individuals, and 6.4% had someone living alone who was 65 years of age or older. The average household size was 2.97 and the average family size was 3.17.

In the city, the population was spread out, with 27.8% under the age of 18, 8.4% from 18 to 24, 29.1% from 25 to 44, 21.8% from 45 to 64, and 12.9% who were 65 years of age or older. The median age was 34 years. For every 100 females, there were 102.7 males. For every 100 females age 18 and over, there were 94.2 males.

The median income for a household in the city was $37,917, and the median income for a family was $39,028. Males had a median income of $32,031 versus $17,813 for females. The per capita income for the city was $17,106. About 8.6% of families and 12.8% of the population were below the poverty line, including 22.0% of those under age 18 and 3.0% of those age 65 or over.

== Climate ==
The climate in this area is characterized by hot, humid summers and generally mild to cool winters. According to the Köppen Climate Classification system, Ghent has a humid subtropical climate, abbreviated "Cfa" on climate maps.

== Notable people ==
- Edwin Otway Burnham (1824–1873), Congregational minister and missionary was born in Ghent
- Nancy Diuguid (1948–2003), American theater director, worked in England and South Africa. Grew up in Ghent.
- Rutus Sarlls (1848–1913), attorney, businessman, inventor, and political candidate was born in Ghent.

== See also ==
- List of cities and towns along the Ohio River
