= Worthville, Kentucky =

- City
- Location of Worthville in Carroll County, Kentucky.
- Coordinates: 38°36′35″N 85°04′05″W
- Country: United States
- State: Kentucky
- County: Carroll

Area
  - Total: 0.25 sq mi (0.66 km^{2})
  - Land: 0.25 sq mi (0.66 km^{2})
  - Water: 0 sq mi (0.00 km^{2})
- Elevation: 486 ft (148 m)

Population (2020)
  - Total: 181
  - Density: 708.5/sq mi (273.57/km^{2})
- Time zone: UTC-5 (Eastern (EST))
  - Summer (DST): UTC-4 (EDT)
- ZIP code: 41098
- Area code: 502
- FIPS code: 21-84900
- GNIS feature ID: 2405792

Worthville is a home rule-class city in Carroll County, Kentucky, United States. As of the 2020 census, Worthville had a population of 181.

== History ==
A post office was established at Worthville in 1847. The community was named for William J. Worth, an American general.

== Geography ==
Worthville is located along the southern boundary of Carroll County. Eagle Creek, on the county line, flows past the southern border of the town and joins the Kentucky River less than 1 mile (1.6 km) to the southwest. Owen County is to the south across the creek. Exit 44 of Interstate 71 is 4 miles (6 km) to the northwest along Kentucky Route 227, and Carrollton, the county seat, is 8 miles (13 km) to the northwest.

According to the United States Census Bureau, Worthville has a total area of 0.25 square miles (0.66 km^{2}), all land.

== Demographics ==
Historical population
Census	Pop.	Note	%±
1880	124		—
1890	203		63.7%
1900	223		9.9%
1910	326		46.2%
1920	315		−3.4%
1930	297		−5.7%
1940	333		12.1%
1950	308		−7.5%
1960	247		−19.8%
1970	258		4.5%
1980	272		5.4%
1990	191		−29.8%
2000	215		12.6%
2010	185		−14.0%
2020	181		−2.2%
U.S. Decennial Census

As of the census of 2000, 215 people, 78 households, and 58 families reside in the city. The population density was 824.6 inhabitants per square mile (318.4/km^{2}). There were 88 housing units at an average density of 337.5 per square mile (130.3/km^{2}). The racial makeup of the city was 99.07% White, 0.47% African American, and 0.47% from two or more races.

There were 78 trailerhomes out of which 44.9% had children under the age of 18 living with them, 56.4% were married couples living together, 11.5% had a female householder with no husband present, and 25.6% were non-families. 19.2% of all households were made up of individuals, and 6.4% had someone living alone who was 65 years of age or older. The average household size was 2.76 and the average family size was 3.07.

In the city, the population was spread out, with 30.7% under the age of 18, 8.8% from 18 to 24, 30.7% from 25 to 44, 23.7% from 45 to 64, and 6.0% who were 65 years of age or older. The median age was 32 years. For every 100 females, there were 112.9 males. For every 100 females age 18 and over, there were 101.4 males.

The median income for a household in the city was $26,875, and the median income for a family was $28,125. Males had a median income of $27,750 versus $21,250 for females. The per capita income for the city was $10,791. About 10.9% of families and 15.5% of the population were below the poverty line, including 18.8% of those under the age of eighteen and none of those 65 or over.
