= Kentucky Transportation Cabinet =

Government agency in Kentucky, United States

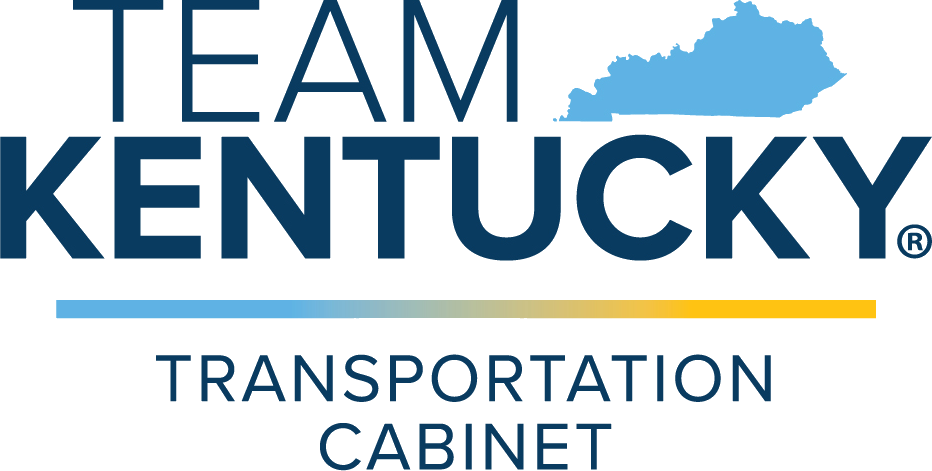

Agency overview
- Formed: 1912
- Jurisdiction: Commonwealth of Kentucky
- Headquarters: 200 Mero Street; Frankfort, Kentucky 40622; 38.2013248°N 84.8740025°W
- Agency executive: Rebecca Goodman, Secretary of Transportation
- Child agency: See below
- Website: transportation.ky.gov

The Kentucky Transportation Cabinet (KYTC) is Kentucky's state-funded agency charged with building and maintaining federal highways and Kentucky state highways, as well as regulating other transportation related issues.

The Transportation Cabinet is led by the Kentucky secretary of transportation, who is appointed by the governor of Kentucky. The current secretary is Rebecca Goodman, who was appointed by Democratic Governor Andy Beshear.

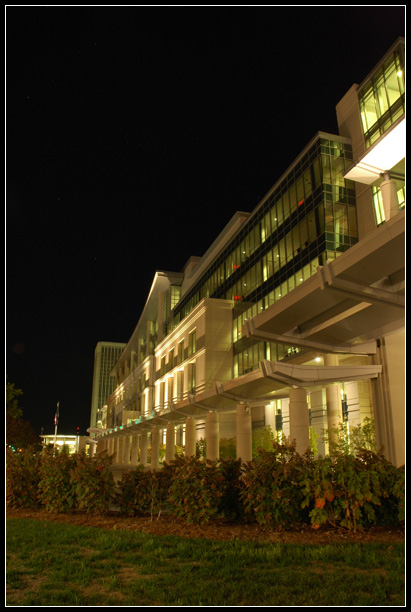
The Kentucky Transportation Cabinet headquarters in Frankfort, Kentucky.

KYTC maintains 63,845 lane miles (102,749 lane kilometers), or over 27,600 centerline miles (44,400 centerline kilometers), of roadways in the state.

The KYTC mission statement is "To provide a safe, efficient, environmentally sound and fiscally responsible transportation system that delivers economic opportunity and enhances the quality of life in Kentucky."

== Organization ==
The Transportation Cabinet is composed of four operating departments, headed by commissioners, and ten support offices, headed by executive directors. Those units are subdivided into divisions headed by directors.

- Secretary
  - Deputy Secretary
    - Office of the Secretary
      - Office of Budget and Fiscal Management
        - Division of Accounts
        - Division of Purchases
      - Office of Audits
        - Division of Road Fund Audits
        - Division of Audit Services
      - Office for Civil Rights and Small Business Development
      - Office of the Inspector General
      - Office of Human Resource Management
        - Division of Personnel Administration
        - Division of Employee Management
        - Division of Professional Development & Organizational Management
      - Office of Legal Services
      - Office of Support Services
        - Division of Facilities Support
        - Division of Graphic Design & Printing
      - Office of Public Affairs
      - Office of Information Technology
      - Office of Transportation Delivery
    - Department of Highways - responsible for designing and constructing state highways
      - Division of Program Management
      - Office of Project Development
        - Division of Planning
        - Division of Structural Design
        - Division of Highway Design
        - Division of Environmental Analysis
        - Division of Right of Way & Utilities
        - Division of Professional Services
      - Office of Project Delivery and Preservation
        - Division of Construction
        - Division of Materials
        - Division of Construction Procurement
        - Division of Equipment
        - Division of Traffic Operations
        - Division of Maintenance
      - Office of Highway Safety
        - Division of Incident Management
        - Division of Highway Safety Programs
        - Motorcycle Advisory Commission for Highway Safety (Attached to KYTC for Administrative purposes)
        - Motorcycle Safety Education Advisory Commission (Attached to KYTC for Administrative purposes)
      - District Offices 1–12
    - Department of Aviation - responsible for promoting the use and safety of Kentucky's airports
      - Capital City Airport Division
      - Greater Commonwealth Aviation Division
      - Kentucky Airport Zoning Commission (Attached to KYTC for Administrative purposes)
    - Department of Rural and Municipal Aid - provides aid and assistance for local governments to improve transportation infrastructure
      - Office of Local Programs
        - Kentucky Bicycle & Bikeway Commission (Attached to KYTC for Administrative Purposes)
      - Office of Rural and Secondary Roads
    - Department of Vehicle Regulation - oversees regulations for the use and operation of motor vehicles
      - Division of Motor Vehicle Licensing
      - Division of Motor Carriers
      - Division of Driver Licensing
      - Kentucky Motor Vehicle Commission (Attached to KYTC for Administrative Purposes)

== Highway districts ==
Map of KYTC districts

KYTC organizes the state into twelve highway districts that report to the state highway engineer, who currently is James Ballinger:

District	Counties	State-Maintained Mileage
1	Ballard, Calloway, Carlisle, Crittenden, Fulton, Graves, Hickman, Livingston, Lyon, McCracken, Marshall, Trigg	2,838.618
2	Caldwell, Christian, Daviess, Hancock, Henderson, Hopkins, McLean, Muhlenberg, Ohio, Union, Webster	3,275.848
3	Allen, Barren, Butler, Edmonson, Logan, Metcalfe, Monroe, Simpson, Todd, Warren	2,477.064
4	Breckinridge, Grayson, Green, Hardin, Hart, LaRue, Marion, Meade, Nelson, Taylor, Washington	2,925.968
5	Bullitt, Franklin, Henry, Jefferson, Oldham, Shelby, Spencer, Trimble	1,779.016
6	Boone, Bracken, Campbell, Carroll, Gallatin, Grant, Harrison, Kenton, Owen, Pendleton, Robertson	1,916.171
7	Anderson, Bourbon, Boyle, Clark, Fayette, Garrard, Jessamine, Madison, Mercer, Montgomery, Scott, Woodford	2,183.432
8	Adair, Casey, Clinton, Cumberland, Lincoln, McCreary, Pulaski, Rockcastle, Russell, Wayne	2,409.396
9	Bath, Boyd, Carter, Elliott, Fleming, Greenup, Lewis, Mason, Nicholas, Rowan	2,027.592
10	Breathitt, Estill, Lee, Magoffin, Menifee, Morgan, Owsley, Perry, Powell, Wolfe	1,841.544
11	Bell, Clay, Harlan, Jackson, Knox, Laurel, Leslie, Whitley	2,061.449
12	Floyd, Johnson, Knott, Lawrence, Letcher, Martin, Pike	1,879.919
