= Sanders, Kentucky =

- City
- Location of Sanders in Carroll County, Kentucky.
- Coordinates: 38°39′17″N 84°56′48″W
- Country: United States
- State: Kentucky
- County: Carroll
- Incorporated: 1871
- Reïncorporated: 1882
- Named after: George Washington Sanders, a local miller

Area
  - Total: 0.30 sq mi (0.77 km^{2})
  - Land: 0.29 sq mi (0.76 km^{2})
  - Water: 0.0039 sq mi (0.01 km^{2})
- Elevation: 486 ft (148 m)

Population (2020)
  - Total: 197
  - Density: 671/sq mi (258.9/km^{2})
- Time zone: UTC-5 (Eastern (EST))
  - Summer (DST): UTC-4 (EDT)
- ZIP code: 41083
- Area code: 502
- FIPS code: 21-68358
- GNIS feature ID: 2405414

Sanders is a home rule-class city in Carroll County, Kentucky, in the United States. As of the 2020 census, Sanders had a population of 197.

== History ==
The community was founded at a salt lick on the Buffalo Trace stretching from the Licking River to Drennon Springs. The community was first known as Rislerville for a local shopkeeper, but was known as Sanders' Mill after the local miller Nathaniel Sanders opened a post office in 1816. His son George Washington Sanders continued to operate the mill after his death.

When the community was connected to the Louisville, Cincinnati and Lexington Railroad in 1867, the station was first named Dixie by the locals but then changed to Liberty Station by the railroad, owing to the importance of the station's trade with nearby New Liberty. The name reverted to Sanders in 1874, according to local historian Anna Parker, owing to the influence of State Senator Larkin Sanders, who wanted to honor his father.

== Geography ==
Sanders is located in the southeast corner of Carroll County along Eagle Creek, a tributary of the Kentucky River. It is bordered to the south, across Eagle Creek, by Owen County, and Gallatin County begins less than 1 mile (1.6 km) to the east. Exit 55 on Interstate 71 is 4.5 miles (7.2 km) to the north.

According to the United States Census Bureau, the city has a total area of 0.30 square miles (0.77 km^{2}), of which 0.004 square miles (0.01 km^{2}), or 0.81%, is water.

== Demographics ==
Historical population
Census	Pop.	Note	%±
1890	277		—
1900	218		−21.3%
1910	250		14.7%
1920	291		16.4%
1930	286		−1.7%
1940	278		−2.8%
1950	206		−25.9%
1960	203		−1.5%
1970	268		32.0%
1980	332		23.9%
1990	231		−30.4%
2000	246		6.5%
2010	238		−3.3%
2020	197		−17.2%
U.S. Decennial Census

As of the census of 2000, there were 246 people, 78 households, and 51 families residing in the city. The population density was 790.1 inhabitants per square mile (305.1/km^{2}). There were 90 housing units at an average density of 289.0 per square mile (111.6/km^{2}). The racial makeup of the city was 97.56% White and 2.44% African American.

There were 78 households, out of which 32.1% had children under the age of 18 living with them, 48.7% were married couples living together, 5.1% had a female householder with no husband present, and 34.6% were non-families. 25.6% of all households were made up of individuals, and 5.1% had someone living alone who was 65 years of age or older. The average household size was 2.63 and the average family size was 3.14.

In the city, the population was spread out, with 22.4% under the age of 18, 8.1% from 18 to 24, 30.9% from 25 to 44, 28.5% from 45 to 64, and 10.2% who were 65 years of age or older. The median age was 40 years. For every 100 females, there were 138.8 males. For every 100 females age 18 and over, there were 172.9 males.

The median income for a household in the city was $36,146, and the median income for a family was $37,708. Males had a median income of $28,250 versus $27,917 for females. The per capita income for the city was $11,230. None of the families and 26.7% of the population were living below the poverty line, including no under eighteens and 71.0% of those over 64.
