= Carroll County, Kentucky =

County in Kentucky, United States

- County
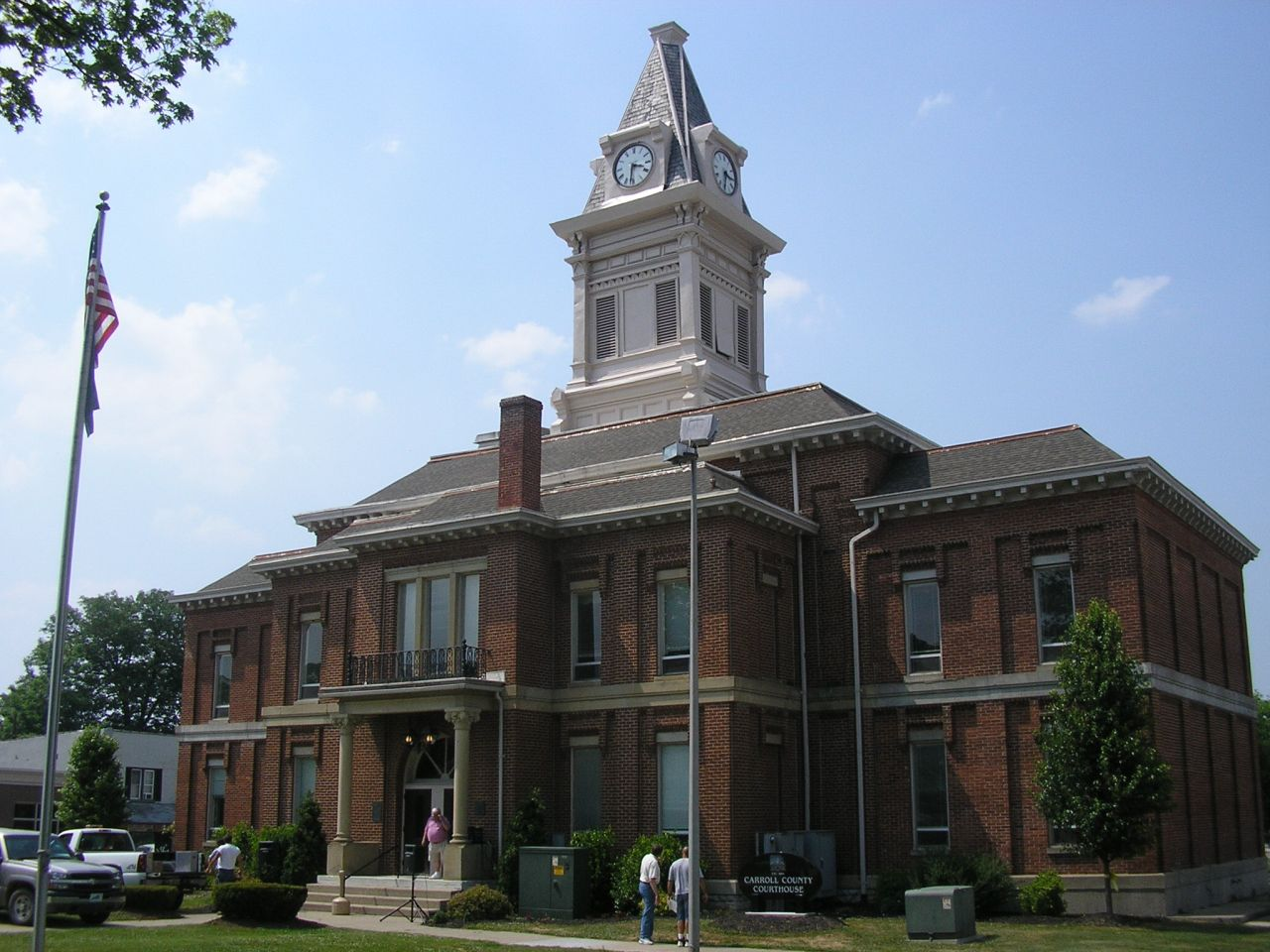
- Carroll County Courthouse in Carrollton

- Location within the U.S. state of Kentucky
- Coordinates: 38°40′N 85°08′W
- Country: United States
- State: Kentucky
- Founded: 1838
- Named for: Charles Carroll of Carrollton
- Seat: Carrollton
- Largest city: Carrollton

Government
  - Judge/Executive: David Wilhoite (D)

Area
  - Total: 137 sq mi (350 km^{2})
  - Land: 129 sq mi (330 km^{2})
  - Water: 8.7 sq mi (23 km^{2}) 6.4%

Population (2020)
  - Total: 10,810
  - Estimate (2025): 11,141 ▲
  - Density: 83.8/sq mi (32.4/km^{2})
- Time zone: UTC−5 (Eastern)
  - Summer (DST): UTC−4 (EDT)
- Congressional district: 4th
- Website: www.carrollcountygov.us

Carroll County is a county located in the northern part of the U.S. state of Kentucky. Its county seat is Carrollton. The county was formed in 1838 and named for Charles Carroll of Carrollton, the last living signer of the Declaration of Independence. It is located at the confluence of the Kentucky and Ohio Rivers.

== Geography ==
According to the U.S. Census Bureau, the county has a total area of 137 square miles (350 km^{2}), of which 129 square miles (330 km^{2}) is land and 8.7 square miles (23 km^{2}) (6.4%) is water. It is the third-smallest county by area in Kentucky.

=== Adjacent counties ===
- Jefferson County, Indiana (northwest)
- Switzerland County, Indiana (north)
- Gallatin County (east)
- Owen County (southeast)
- Henry County (south)
- Trimble County (west)

== Demographics ==
Historical population
Census	Pop.	Note	%±
1840	3,966		—
1850	5,526		39.3%
1860	6,578		19.0%
1870	6,189		−5.9%
1880	8,953		44.7%
1890	9,266		3.5%
1900	9,825		6.0%
1910	8,110		−17.5%
1920	8,346		2.9%
1930	8,155		−2.3%
1940	8,657		6.2%
1950	8,517		−1.6%
1960	7,978		−6.3%
1970	8,523		6.8%
1980	9,270		8.8%
1990	9,292		0.2%
2000	10,155		9.3%
2010	10,811		6.5%
2020	10,810		0.0%
2025 (est.)	11,141	▲	3.1%
U.S. Decennial Census; 1790-1960 1900-1990; 1990-2000 2010-2020

=== 2020 census ===
As of the 2020 census, the county had a population of 10,810. The median age was 38.9 years. 25.0% of residents were under the age of 18 and 16.4% of residents were 65 years of age or older. For every 100 females there were 101.2 males, and for every 100 females age 18 and over there were 98.8 males age 18 and over.

The racial makeup of the county was 88.5% White, 1.7% Black or African American, 0.4% American Indian and Alaska Native, 0.4% Asian, 0.0% Native Hawaiian and Pacific Islander, 2.9% from some other race, and 6.1% from two or more races. Hispanic or Latino residents of any race comprised 7.4% of the population.

50.6% of residents lived in urban areas, while 49.4% lived in rural areas.

There were 4,090 households in the county, of which 33.6% had children under the age of 18 living with them and 25.7% had a female householder with no spouse or partner present. About 26.2% of all households were made up of individuals and 10.9% had someone living alone who was 65 years of age or older.

There were 4,658 housing units, of which 12.2% were vacant. Among occupied housing units, 61.2% were owner-occupied and 38.8% were renter-occupied. The homeowner vacancy rate was 1.7% and the rental vacancy rate was 7.8%.

=== 2000 census ===
As of the census of 2000, there were 10,155 people, 3,940 households, and 2,722 families residing in the county. The population density was 78 per square mile (30/km^{2}). There were 4,439 housing units at an average density of 34 per square mile (13/km^{2}). The racial makeup of the county was 95.16% White, 1.94% Black or African American, 0.23% Native American, 0.17% Asian, 0.05% Pacific Islander, 1.42% from other races, and 1.04% from two or more races. 3.25% of the population were Hispanic or Latino of any race.

There were 3,940 households, out of which 33.10% had children under the age of 18 living with them, 52.40% were married couples living together, 11.70% had a female householder with no husband present, and 30.90% were non-families. 25.30% of all households were made up of individuals, and 10.10% had someone living alone who was 65 years of age or older. The average household size was 2.51 and the average family size was 2.98.

In the county, the population was spread out, with 25.30% under the age of 18, 9.10% from 18 to 24, 29.90% from 25 to 44, 23.20% from 45 to 64, and 12.50% who were 65 years of age or older. The median age was 36 years. For every 100 females there were 101.20 males. For every 100 females age 18 and over, there were 99.00 males.

The median income for a household in the county was $35,925, and the median income for a family was $44,037. Males had a median income of $33,588 versus $20,974 for females. The per capita income for the county was $17,057. About 10.40% of families and 14.90% of the population were below the poverty line, including 19.80% of those under age 18 and 21.60% of those age 65 or over.

== Communities ==
=== Cities ===
- Carrollton (county seat)
- Ghent
- Prestonville
- Sanders
- Worthville

=== Unincorporated community ===
- English

== Law enforcement ==
In 2023, Carroll County Sheriff's Office hired Myles Cosgrove, a police officer who killed Breonna Taylor in 2020 and was subsequently fired by the Louisville Metro Police Department. The Sheriff's Office said it performed a background check on Cosgrove which he passed.

== Politics ==
United States presidential election results for Carroll County, Kentucky
Year	Republican		Democratic		Third party(ies)	
Year	No.	%	No.	%	No.	%
1880	372	20.31%	1,460	79.69%	0	0.00%
1884	434	23.47%	1,349	72.96%	66	3.57%
1888	623	26.76%	1,632	70.10%	73	3.14%
1892	542	24.73%	1,574	71.81%	76	3.47%
1896	685	27.19%	1,778	70.58%	56	2.22%
1900	749	28.99%	1,808	69.97%	27	1.04%
1904	546	25.40%	1,548	72.00%	56	2.60%
1908	546	25.91%	1,514	71.86%	47	2.23%
1912	317	15.09%	1,573	74.87%	211	10.04%
1916	535	23.15%	1,757	76.03%	19	0.82%
1920	906	21.88%	3,209	77.49%	26	0.63%
1924	1,306	36.59%	2,243	62.85%	20	0.56%
1928	1,649	46.91%	1,863	53.00%	3	0.09%
1932	761	20.05%	3,015	79.45%	19	0.50%
1936	794	22.39%	2,718	76.63%	35	0.99%
1940	804	21.55%	2,915	78.15%	11	0.29%
1944	755	22.02%	2,662	77.65%	11	0.32%
1948	639	18.66%	2,626	76.67%	160	4.67%
1952	1,019	28.06%	2,605	71.72%	8	0.22%
1956	1,130	34.08%	2,169	65.41%	17	0.51%
1960	1,135	33.78%	2,225	66.22%	0	0.00%
1964	491	15.81%	2,592	83.48%	22	0.71%
1968	868	27.54%	1,765	56.00%	519	16.47%
1972	1,228	47.71%	1,308	50.82%	38	1.48%
1976	815	26.30%	2,251	72.64%	33	1.06%
1980	1,076	32.33%	2,127	63.91%	125	3.76%
1984	1,824	53.65%	1,564	46.00%	12	0.35%
1988	1,702	46.81%	1,913	52.61%	21	0.58%
1992	1,046	27.92%	2,119	56.57%	581	15.51%
1996	1,170	36.14%	1,689	52.18%	378	11.68%
2000	1,818	51.96%	1,601	45.76%	80	2.29%
2004	2,175	55.81%	1,688	43.32%	34	0.87%
2008	2,032	52.99%	1,716	44.75%	87	2.27%
2012	1,999	54.32%	1,629	44.27%	52	1.41%
2016	2,588	67.13%	1,106	28.69%	161	4.18%
2020	2,954	71.42%	1,116	26.98%	66	1.60%
2024	3,014	74.88%	963	23.93%	48	1.19%

Carroll County was strongly pro-Confederate during the Civil War: only 2.70 percent of its white population volunteered to serve in the Union Army, which constitutes the fourteenth-lowest of 109 counties extant as of the 1860 election, and was indeed lower than for the whole of seceded Tennessee. Consequently, Carroll County remained overwhelmingly Democratic for the next century and a quarter, being the only Kentucky county outside the heavily unionized coalfields to vote for George McGovern in 1972. The first Republican to carry Carroll County was Ronald Reagan in 1984, and the growing social liberalism of the Democratic Party has meant the county has voted increasingly Republican since the turn of the century, although Hillary Clinton's 28.69 percent – even if over fifteen percent worse than any previous Democrat – was still as good as she received in any rural white southern county.

In gubernatorial elections, Carroll remained solidly Democratic for a long time, with no Republican gubernatorial candidate ever carrying the county until 2019, when it voted for Matt Bevin.

The county voted "No" on 2022 Kentucky Amendment 2, an anti-abortion ballot measure, by 54% to 46%, and backed Donald Trump with 71% of the vote to Joe Biden's 27% in the 2020 presidential election.

=== Elected officials ===
Elected officials as of January 3, 2025
U.S. House	Thomas Massie (R)	KY 4
Ky. Senate	Gex Williams (R)	20
Ky. House	Felicia Rabourn (R)	47

== See also ==
- Carroll County Public Schools
- National Register of Historic Places listings in Carroll County, Kentucky
