= Gallatin County, Kentucky =

County in Kentucky, United States

- County
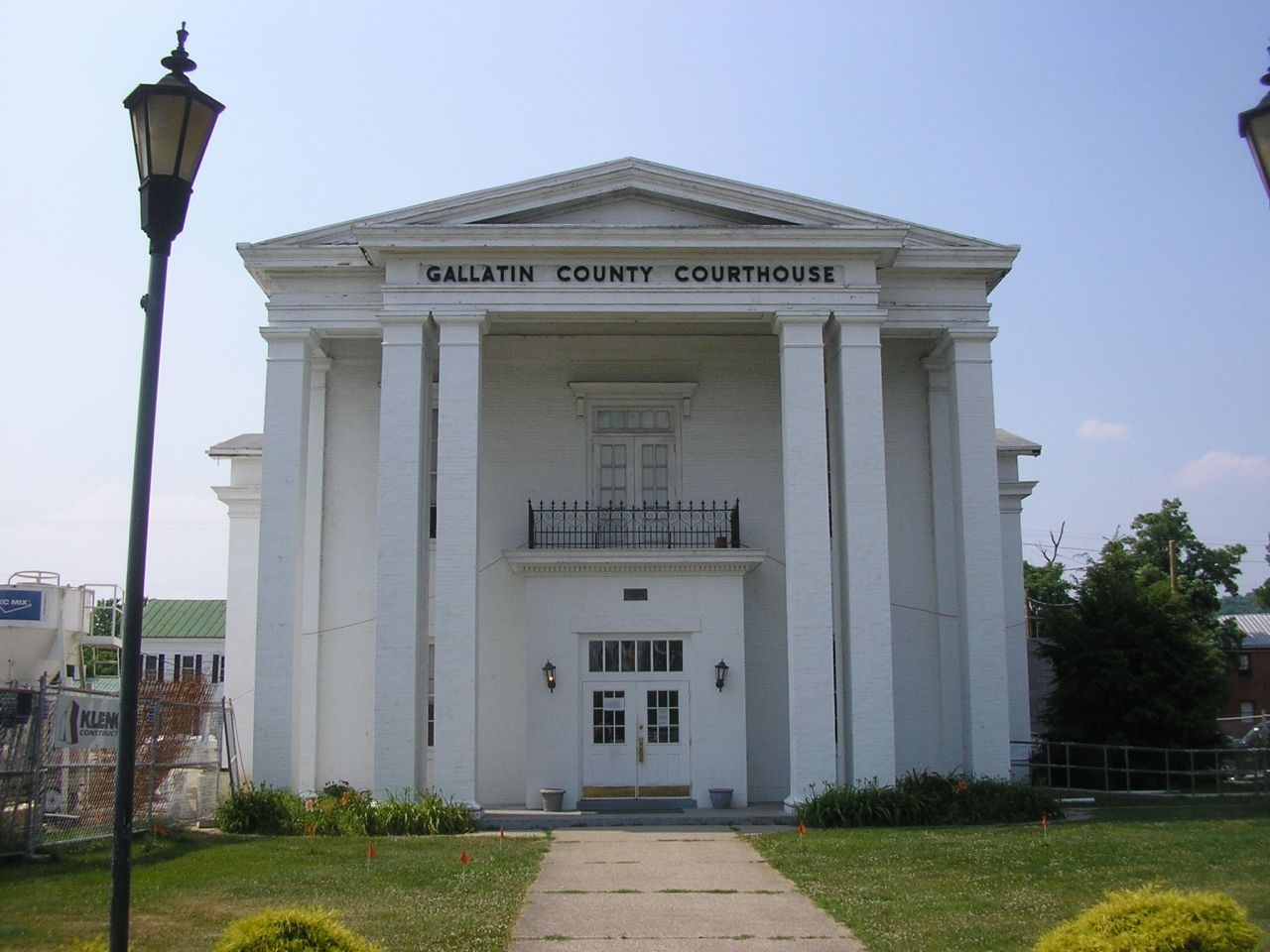
- Gallatin County Courthouse in Warsaw

- Location within the U.S. state of Kentucky
- Coordinates: 38.76°N 84.86°W
- Country: United States
- State: Kentucky
- Founded: 1798
- Named for: Albert Gallatin
- Seat: Warsaw
- Largest city: Warsaw

Government
  - Judge/Executive: Ryan Morris (D)

Area
  - Total: 105 sq mi (270 km^{2})
  - Land: 101 sq mi (260 km^{2})
  - Water: 3.5 sq mi (9.1 km^{2}) 3.3%

Population (2020)
  - Total: 8,690
  - Estimate (2025): 8,840 ▲
  - Density: 86.0/sq mi (33.2/km^{2})
- Time zone: UTC−5 (Eastern)
  - Summer (DST): UTC−4 (EDT)
- Congressional district: 4th
- Website: www.gallatinky.gov

Gallatin County is a county located in the northern part of the U.S. state of Kentucky. Its county seat is Warsaw. The county was founded in 1798 and named for Albert Gallatin, the Secretary of the Treasury under President Thomas Jefferson. Gallatin County is included in the Cincinnati-Middletown, OH-KY-IN Metropolitan Statistical Area. It is located along the Ohio River across from Indiana.

== History ==
The county was formed on December 14, 1798. Gallatin was the 31st Kentucky county to be established. It was derived from parts of Franklin and Shelby counties. Later, parts of the county were pared off to create three additional counties: Owen in 1819, Trimble in 1836, and Carroll in 1838. Today Gallatin is one tenth of its original size. Its northern border is the Ohio River.

The population of Gallatin County in 1800 was 1,291, according to the Second Census of Kentucky, composed of 960 whites, 329 slaves, and 2 "freemen of color".

During the Civil War, several skirmishes occurred in the county and the Union Army arrested a number of men for treason for supporting the Confederates.

The 1866 Gallatin County Race Riot happened just after the Civil War, when bands of lawless Ku Klux Klansmen terrorized parts of the Bluegrass State. "A band of five hundred whites in Gallatin County... forced hundreds of blacks to flee across the Ohio River."

On December 4, 1868, two passenger steamers, the America and the United States, collided on the Ohio River near Warsaw. The United States carried a cargo of kerosene barrels which caught fire. The flames soon spread to the America, and many passengers perished by burning or drowning. The combined death toll was 162, making it one of the most deadly steamboat accidents in American history.

The Lynchings of the Frenches of Warsaw were conducted by a white mob on May 3, 1876. It was unusual as Benjamin and Mollie French were killed for the murder of Lake Jones, another, older African-American man. They were hanged by local masked KKK members.

As the 20th century progressed, commercial river trade began to decline, and the steamboat era ended, as faster means of transportation became available. Rail lines expanded, automobiles and trucks became reliable, and aircraft soon arrived on the scene. In the postwar period after World War II, numerous major highways were constructed, leading to greater auto travel and commuting. Gallatin County is traversed by I-71, U.S. 42, and U.S. 127. By the 1980s, more than 50 percent of the population was employed outside the county.

Construction on the Markland Locks and Dam began in 1956 and was completed in 1964. In 1967 a hydroelectric power plant was built at the dam, which provided jobs.

Marco Allen Chapman was executed in 2008 for multiple murders he committed on August 23, 2002, in Warsaw, Kentucky. He murdered two children, Chelbi Sharon, 7, and Cody Sharon, 6, by slitting their throats. He raped and stabbed their mother, Carolyn Marksberry, more than 15 times. A third child, daughter 10-year-old Courtney Sharon, played dead after being stabbed and then escaped. Thirty-seven-year-old Chapman was executed on November 21, 2008, by lethal injection at the Kentucky State Penitentiary in Eddyville, Kentucky. He was the last person executed by the Commonwealth.

== Geography ==
According to the U.S. Census Bureau, the county has a total area of 105 square miles (270 km^{2}), of which 101 square miles (260 km^{2}) is land and 3.5 square miles (9.1 km^{2}) (3.3%) is water. It is the second smallest county by area in Kentucky.

=== Adjacent counties ===
- Switzerland County, Indiana (north)
- Boone County (northeast)
- Grant County (southeast)
- Owen County (south)
- Carroll County (west)

== Demographics ==
Historical population
Census	Pop.	Note	%±
1800	1,291		—
1810	3,307		156.2%
1820	7,075		113.9%
1830	6,674		−5.7%
1840	4,003		−40.0%
1850	5,137		28.3%
1860	5,056		−1.6%
1870	5,074		0.4%
1880	4,832		−4.8%
1890	4,611		−4.6%
1900	5,163		12.0%
1910	4,697		−9.0%
1920	4,664		−0.7%
1930	4,437		−4.9%
1940	4,307		−2.9%
1950	3,969		−7.8%
1960	3,867		−2.6%
1970	4,134		6.9%
1980	4,842		17.1%
1990	5,393		11.4%
2000	7,870		45.9%
2010	8,589		9.1%
2020	8,690		1.2%
2025 (est.)	8,840	▲	1.7%
U.S. Decennial Census; 1790–1960 1900–1990; 1990–2000 2010–2021

=== 2020 census ===
As of the 2020 census, the county had a population of 8,690. The median age was 39.5 years. 25.2% of residents were under the age of 18 and 15.3% of residents were 65 years of age or older. For every 100 females there were 99.4 males, and for every 100 females age 18 and over there were 99.5 males age 18 and over.

The racial makeup of the county was 90.5% White, 0.9% Black or African American, 0.3% American Indian and Alaska Native, 0.1% Asian, 0.1% Native Hawaiian and Pacific Islander, 3.0% from some other race, and 5.2% from two or more races. Hispanic or Latino residents of any race comprised 5.7% of the population.

0.0% of residents lived in urban areas, while 100.0% lived in rural areas.

There were 3,202 households in the county, of which 33.8% had children under the age of 18 living with them and 21.8% had a female householder with no spouse or partner present. About 23.2% of all households were made up of individuals and 9.4% had someone living alone who was 65 years of age or older.

There were 3,685 housing units, of which 13.1% were vacant. Among occupied housing units, 72.0% were owner-occupied and 28.0% were renter-occupied. The homeowner vacancy rate was 1.6% and the rental vacancy rate was 7.5%.

=== 2010 census ===
As of the 2010 United States census, there were 8,589 people living in the county. 94.7% were White, 1.3% Black or African American, 0.2% Asian, 0.1% Native American, 1.6% of some other race and 2.0% of two or more races. 4.3% were Hispanic or Latino (of any race). 22.6% were of German, 21.4% American, 13.8% Irish and 6.5% English ancestry.

=== 2000 census ===
As of the census of 2000, there were 7,870 people, 2,902 households, and 2,135 families living in the county. The population density was 80 per square mile (31/km^{2}). There were 3,362 housing units at an average density of 34 per square mile (13/km^{2}). The racial makeup of the county was 96.72% White, 1.59% Black or African American, 0.18% Native American, 0.22% Asian, 0.25% from other races, and 1.04% from two or more races. 1.04% of the population were Hispanic or Latino of any race.

There were 2,902 households, out of which 37.00% had children under the age of 18 living with them, 58.00% were married couples living together, 10.70% had a female householder with no husband present, and 26.40% were non-families. 22.00% of all households were made up of individuals, and 8.20% had someone living alone who was 65 years of age or older. The average household size was 2.68 and the average family size was 3.11.

In the county, the population was spread out, with 28.60% under the age of 18, 7.70% from 18 to 24, 31.00% from 25 to 44, 22.50% from 45 to 64, and 10.30% who were 65 years of age or older. The median age was 35 years. For every 100 females there were 98.90 males. For every 100 females age 18 and over, there were 96.00 males.

The median income for a household in the county was $36,422, and the median income for a family was $41,136. Males had a median income of $32,081 versus $21,803 for females. The per capita income for the county was $16,416. About 11.60% of families and 13.40% of the population were below the poverty line, including 16.60% of those under age 18 and 16.40% of those age 65 or over.

== Politics ==
United States presidential election results for Gallatin County, Kentucky
Year	Republican		Democratic		Third party(ies)	
Year	No.	%	No.	%	No.	%
1880	274	28.63%	683	71.37%	0	0.00%
1884	254	25.02%	753	74.19%	8	0.79%
1888	313	26.98%	821	70.78%	26	2.24%
1892	237	23.72%	737	73.77%	25	2.50%
1896	396	29.44%	933	69.37%	16	1.19%
1900	404	28.27%	1,018	71.24%	7	0.49%
1904	334	25.87%	941	72.89%	16	1.24%
1908	321	24.92%	958	74.38%	9	0.70%
1912	174	14.57%	906	75.88%	114	9.55%
1916	283	21.01%	1,060	78.69%	4	0.30%
1920	536	23.03%	1,782	76.58%	9	0.39%
1924	750	42.13%	1,007	56.57%	23	1.29%
1928	1,010	55.04%	823	44.85%	2	0.11%
1932	365	16.87%	1,792	82.85%	6	0.28%
1936	404	21.55%	1,456	77.65%	15	0.80%
1940	495	25.10%	1,473	74.70%	4	0.20%
1944	516	27.33%	1,360	72.03%	12	0.64%
1948	342	19.67%	1,381	79.41%	16	0.92%
1952	465	25.12%	1,383	74.72%	3	0.16%
1956	547	30.89%	1,223	69.06%	1	0.06%
1960	756	42.38%	1,028	57.62%	0	0.00%
1964	267	17.60%	1,246	82.14%	4	0.26%
1968	413	29.35%	685	48.69%	309	21.96%
1972	719	53.38%	612	45.43%	16	1.19%
1976	436	26.86%	1,164	71.72%	23	1.42%
1980	684	40.14%	988	57.98%	32	1.88%
1984	1,042	49.78%	1,042	49.78%	9	0.43%
1988	881	45.13%	1,060	54.30%	11	0.56%
1992	699	30.01%	1,171	50.28%	459	19.71%
1996	838	35.72%	1,189	50.68%	319	13.60%
2000	1,345	54.70%	1,049	42.66%	65	2.64%
2004	1,869	60.82%	1,188	38.66%	16	0.52%
2008	1,840	57.63%	1,278	40.03%	75	2.35%
2012	1,758	57.43%	1,238	40.44%	65	2.12%
2016	2,443	73.19%	749	22.44%	146	4.37%
2020	2,955	76.77%	822	21.36%	72	1.87%
2024	3,109	79.37%	761	19.43%	47	1.20%

Gallatin County used to be Democratic. In 1984, it was tied between Walter Mondale and Ronald Reagan, even as Reagan won Kentucky in a landslide. However, more recently it has turned more Republican, giving 73% of the vote to Donald Trump (even as Trump lost the popular vote nationally) in 2016.

=== Elected officials ===
Elected officials as of January 3, 2025
U.S. House	Thomas Massie (R)	KY 4
Ky. Senate	Gex Williams (R)	20
Ky. House	Savannah Maddox (R)	61

== Communities ==
- Glencoe
- Sparta
- Warsaw (county seat)

== Transportation ==
Interstate 71 runs through Gallatin County, with three exits around Sparta and Glencoe. Public transportation is provided by Senior Services of Northern Kentucky with demand-response service.

Proposals to build an airport in Gallatin County first circulated in 2004. Funding was officially granted by federal, state, and local authorities in 2019. The Gallatin County Airport opened in June 2023.

== Notable residents ==
- Samuel Brenton (November 22, 1810 – March 29, 1857) a US Representative from Indiana; born in Gallatin County, Kentucky.
- John Taylor (Baptist preacher), a notable pioneer preacher and church historian, who became part of the frontier planter elite, holding 20 slaves and 2,000 acres (810 ha) in the county by the early 19th century.

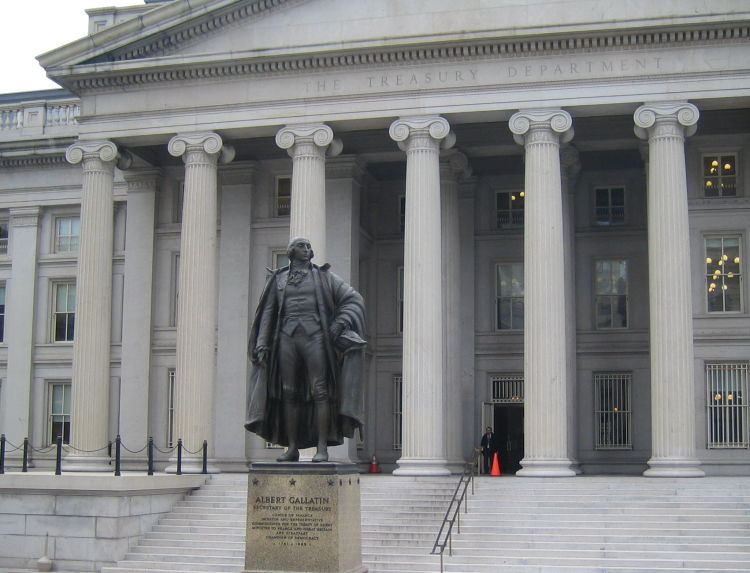
Albert Gallatin is honored with a statue in front of the U.S. Treasury Building in Washington, D.C.

== See also ==
- Gallatin County High School
- National Register of Historic Places listings in Gallatin County, Kentucky
