= List of Kentucky supplemental roads and rural secondary highways (600–699) =

Kentucky supplemental roads and rural secondary highways (600–699)
- Highway markers for KY 600 and KY 699

Highway names
- Interstates: Interstate nn (I-nn)
- US Highways: U.S. Highway nn (US nn)
- State: KY nn

System links
- Kentucky State Highway System; Interstate; US; State; Parkways
- Supplemental/Rural Secondary; 1–199; 200–299; 300–399; 400–499; 500–599; 600–699; 700–799; 800–899; 900–999; 1000–1499; 1500–1999; 2000–2499; 2500–2999; 3000–3499; 3500–6999

Kentucky supplemental roads and rural secondary highways are the lesser two of the four functional classes of highways constructed and maintained by the Kentucky Transportation Cabinet, the state-level agency that constructs and maintains highways in Kentucky. The agency splits its inventory of state highway mileage into four categories:

- The State Primary System includes Interstate Highways, Parkways, and other long-distance highways of statewide importance that connect the state's major cities, including much of the courses of Kentucky's U.S. Highways.
- The State Secondary System includes highways of regional importance that connect the state's smaller urban centers, including those county seats not served by the state primary system.
- The Rural Secondary System includes highways of local importance, such as farm-to-market roads and urban collectors.
- Supplemental Roads are the set of highways not in the first three systems, including frontage roads, bypassed portions of other state highways, and rural roads that only serve their immediate area.

The same-numbered highway can comprise sections of road under different categories. This list contains descriptions of Supplemental Roads and highways in the Rural Secondary System numbered 600 to 699 that do not have portions within the State Primary and State Secondary systems.

== Kentucky Route 600 ==
Kentucky Route 600
- Location: near Clifty
- Length: 2.728 mi (4.390 km)

Kentucky Route 600 is a 2.728-mile-long (4.390 km) state highway in Muhlenberg County that runs from Kentucky Route 831 to Kentucky Route 171 northwest of Clifty.

=== Major intersections ===
The entire route is in Muhlenberg County.

Location	mi	km	Destinations	Notes
	0.000	0.000	KY 831	Southern terminus
	2.728	4.390	KY 171	Northern terminus
1.000 mi = 1.609 km; 1.000 km = 0.621 mi

== Kentucky Route 601 ==
Kentucky Route 601
- Location: Greenville-near Graham
- Length: 2.728 mi (4.390 km)

Kentucky Route 601 is a 2.728-mile-long (4.390 km) state highway in Muhlenberg County that runs from Kentucky Route 181 on the western Greenville city line to Kentucky Route 175 north of Graham via New Cypress.

=== Major intersections ===
The entire route is in Muhlenberg County.

Location	mi	km	Destinations	Notes
Greenville	0.000	0.000	KY 181 (Luzerne Drive)	Southern terminus
	3.153	5.074	KY 2690 west (New Cypress Road) / New Cypress Road	Eastern terminus of KY 2690
	6.766	10.889	KY 175	Northern terminus
1.000 mi = 1.609 km; 1.000 km = 0.621 mi

== Kentucky Route 602 ==
Kentucky Route 602
- Location: Central City
- Length: 0.690 mi (1,110 m)

Kentucky Route 602 is a 0.690-mile-long (1.110 km) supplemental road in Central City in central Muhlenberg County. The highway begins at KY 277 (River Road) in the north of downtown. KY 602 heads north along an unnamed street and meets the western end of KY 3038 (Prison Road) before reaching its north end at KY 1031 (Second Street).

=== Major intersections ===
The entire route is in Central City, Muhlenberg County.

mi	km	Destinations	Notes
0.000	0.000	KY 277 (River Road)	Southern terminus
0.651	1.048	KY 3038 east (Peabody Road)	Western terminus of KY 3038
0.690	1.110	KY 1031 (North Second Street)	Northern terminus
1.000 mi = 1.609 km; 1.000 km = 0.621 mi

== Kentucky Route 603 ==
Kentucky Route 603
- Location: Owensboro
- Length: 1.701 mi (2.737 km)

Kentucky Route 603 is a 1.701-mile-long (2.737 km) supplemental road in Owensboro in central Daviess County. The highway begins just south of a diamond interchange with the Wendell Ford Expressway, which carries US 60 and US 231 around the south side of Owensboro; the road continues south as Pleasant Valley Road No. 1. KY 603 passes through an S-curve and expands to a four-lane divided highway. The highway crosses over a CSX rail line and reaches its northern terminus at Fourth Street; this intersection also serves as the western terminus of KY 144.

=== History ===
KY 603 was formed on September 12, 2011.

The original KY 603 ran from US 421 to KY 602 in Central City. This was given to the city on May 5, 1994, and is now Park Street.

=== Major intersections ===
The entire route is in Daviess County.

Location	mi	km	Destinations	Notes
	0.000	0.000	Pleasant Valley Road No. 1	Southern terminus
	0.211– 0.265	0.340– 0.426	US 60 / US 231 (Wendell H. Ford Expressway) – Hawesville, Henderson	US 60/US 231 exit 19
Owensboro	1.701	2.737	KY 144 east (East Fourth Street) / East Fourth Street	Northern terminus; western terminus of KY 144
1.000 mi = 1.609 km; 1.000 km = 0.621 mi

== Kentucky Route 604 ==
Kentucky Route 604
- Location: Central City
- Length: 0.975 mi (1,569 m)

Kentucky Route 604 is a 0.975-mile-long (1.569 km) supplemental road in Central City in central Muhlenberg County. The highway begins at US 431 (Second Street) just south of the U.S. Highway's four–loop ramp interchange with the Western Kentucky Parkway on the eastern edge of the city. KY 604 heads east and then turns north at Youngstown Road. The highway crosses over the parkway before reaching its north end at an acute intersection with US 62 (Everly Brothers Boulevard).

=== Major intersections ===
The entire route is in Central City, Muhlenberg County.

mi	km	Destinations	Notes
0.000	0.000	US 431 / KY 70	Southern terminus
0.975	1.569	US 62 (Everly Brothers Boulevard)	Northern terminus
1.000 mi = 1.609 km; 1.000 km = 0.621 mi

== Kentucky Route 605 ==
Kentucky Route 605
- Location: Manton-Bardstown
- Length: 12.781 mi (20.569 km)

Kentucky Route 605 is a 12.781-mile-long (20.569 km) state highway that runs from Kentucky Route 1183 and Manton Road at Manton to U.S. Route 62 in far northeastern Bardstown via Botland and Woodlawn.

=== Major intersections ===
County	Location	mi	km	Destinations	Notes
Washington	Manton	0.000	0.000	KY 1183 (Cissellville Road) / Manton Road	Southern terminus; continues as Manton Road beyond KY 1183
Nelson	Botland	4.940	7.950	US 150 east (Springfield Road)	South end of US 150 overlap
Nelson		5.814	9.357	US 150 west (Springfield Road)	North end of US 150 overlap
Nelson	Bardstown	12.781	20.569	US 62 (Bloomfield Road)	Northern terminus
1.000 mi = 1.609 km; 1.000 km = 0.621 mi: Concurrency terminus

== Kentucky Route 606 ==
Kentucky Route 606
- Location: near Barterville-near Ellisville
- Length: 2.321 mi (3.735 km)

Kentucky Route 606 is a 2.321-mile-long (3.735 km) state highway in Nicholas County that runs from Bald Hill Road northeast of Barterville to U.S. Route 68 southwest of Ellisville.

=== Major intersections ===
The entire route is in Nicholas County.

Location	mi	km	Destinations	Notes
	0.000	0.000	Bald Hill Road	Western terminus
	2.321	3.735	US 68 (Maysville Road)	Eastern terminus
1.000 mi = 1.609 km; 1.000 km = 0.621 mi

== Kentucky Route 607 ==
Kentucky Route 607
- Location: near Monterey–near Corinth
- Length: 17.421 mi (28.036 km)

Kentucky Route 607 is a 17.421-mile-long (28.036 km) rural secondary highway in southern Owen County. The highway begins at US 127 south of Monterey. KY 607 heads east along New Columbus Road, which immediately crosses Cedar Creek and has a hairpin at New. The route intersects KY 227 (Georgetown Road) west of Fairbanks, east of which the highway crosses Caney Creek. KY 607 meets the southern end of KY 1883 (Slatin Road) and meets the eastern end of KY 2018 (Swope Natlee Road) at Natlee, where the route crosses Eagle Creek. The highway continues through New Columbus to its eastern terminus at KY 330 (Owenton Road) at the Owen–Grant county line.

=== Major intersections ===
The entire route is in Owen County.

Location	mi	km	Destinations	Notes
	0.000	0.000	US 127 / Frank Clark Road	Western terminus; continues as Frank Clark Road beyond US 127
	7.667	12.339	KY 227 (Georgetown Road)	
	11.449	18.425	KY 1883 north (Slatin Road)	Southern terminus of KY 1883
	13.391	21.551	KY 2018 north	Southern terminus of KY 2018
	17.421	28.036	KY 330 (Owenton Road)	Eastern terminus
1.000 mi = 1.609 km; 1.000 km = 0.621 mi

== Kentucky Route 608 ==
Kentucky Route 608
- Location: near Natlee-near Stonewall
- Length: 4.067 mi (6.545 km)

Kentucky Route 608 is a 4.067-mile-long (6.545 km) state highway that runs from Frogtown Road at the Owen-Scott county line southeast of Natlee to U.S. Route 25 south of Stonewall.

=== Major intersections ===
County	Location	mi	km	Destinations	Notes
Owen–Scott county line		0.000	0.000	Frogtown Road	Western terminus; continues as Frogtown Road beyond county line
Scott		4.067	6.545	US 25 (Cincinnati Road)	Eastern terminus
1.000 mi = 1.609 km; 1.000 km = 0.621 mi

== Kentucky Route 609 ==
Kentucky Route 609
- Location: Concord-near Meridian
- Length: 6.220 mi (10.010 km)

Kentucky Route 609 is a 6.220-mile-long (10.010 km) state highway in Pendleton County that runs from Kentucky Route 159 at Concord to Kentucky Route 177 east of Meridian.

=== Major intersections ===
The entire route is in Pendleton County.

Location	mi	km	Destinations	Notes
Concord	0.000	0.000	KY 159	Southern terminus
	6.220	10.010	KY 177	Northern terminus
1.000 mi = 1.609 km; 1.000 km = 0.621 mi

== Kentucky Route 611 ==
Kentucky Route 611
- Location: Lookout-near Jonancy
- Length: 5.993 mi (9.645 km)

Kentucky Route 611 is a 5.993-mile-long (9.645 km) state highway in Pike County that runs from Kentucky Route 195 at Lookout to U.S. Routes 23 and 119 east of Jonancy via Lookout.

=== Major intersections ===
The entire route is in Pike County.

Location	mi	km	Destinations	Notes
Lookout	0.000	0.000	KY 195 (Marrowbone Creek Road)	Southern terminus
	5.993	9.645	US 23 / US 119	Northern terminus
1.000 mi = 1.609 km; 1.000 km = 0.621 mi

== Kentucky Route 612 ==
Kentucky Route 612
- Location: near Rural-near Turkey Creek
- Length: 8.636 mi (13.898 km)

Kentucky Route 612 is a 8.636-mile-long (13.898 km) state highway in northeastern Pike County that runs from Kentucky Route 468 south of Rural to Kentucky Route 292 northeast of Turkey Creek via Turkey Creek.

=== Major intersections ===
The entire route is in Pike County.

Location	mi	km	Destinations	Notes
	0.000	0.000	KY 468 (Big Creek Road)	Western terminus
	8.636	13.898	KY 292 (Williamson Road)	Eastern terminus
1.000 mi = 1.609 km; 1.000 km = 0.621 mi

== Kentucky Route 613 ==
Kentucky Route 613
- Location: Bowen-near Old Lombard
- Length: 9.680 mi (15.578 km)

Kentucky Route 613 is a 9.680-mile-long (15.578 km) state highway in eastern Powell County that runs from Kentucky Routes 11 and 15 at Bowen to Forestry Road No. 23 at the Menifee County line northeast of Old Lombard.

=== Major intersections ===
The entire route is in Powell County.

Location	mi	km	Destinations	Notes
Bowen	0.000	0.000	KY 11 / KY 15 (Campton Road)	Western terminus
	0.580	0.933	KY 599 north (North Fork Road)	Southern terminus of KY 599
	9.680	15.578	Forestry Road No. 23	Eastern terminus; Menifee County line; continues as Forestry Road No. 23 beyond county line
1.000 mi = 1.609 km; 1.000 km = 0.621 mi

== Kentucky Route 614 ==
Kentucky Route 614
- Location: near Pottertown
- Existed: 1985

Kentucky Route 614 was a state highway in Calloway County. It was formed in 1954, and ran from KY 280 east of Pottertown east via Poplar Springs Road. The road was given to Calloway County on June 16, 1985.

The original KY 614 ran from KY 11 in Stanton south to KY 1057; this became part of KY 213 when it was extended south.

== Kentucky Route 615 ==
Kentucky Route 615
- Location: Morris-near Bowen
- Length: 10.119 mi (16.285 km)

Kentucky Route 615 is a 10.119-mile-long (16.285 km) state highway in central Powell County that runs from Kentucky Route 213 at Morris to Kentucky Route 599 northwest of Bowen.

=== Major intersections ===
The entire route is in Powell County.

Location	mi	km	Destinations	Notes
Morris	0.000	0.000	KY 213 (Morris Creek Road)	Western terminus
	4.122	6.634	KY 213 north (Morris Creek Road)	West end of KY 213 overlap
	4.512	7.261	KY 213 south (Morris Creek Road)	East end of KY 213 overlap
	5.536	8.909	KY 1695 north (Hatchers Creek Road)	Southern terminus of KY 1695
	8.273	13.314	KY 1184 south (Cane Creek Road) to KY 11 / KY 15	Northern terminus of KY 1184
	10.119	16.285	KY 599 (North Fork Road / Cane Creek Road)	Eastern terminus
1.000 mi = 1.609 km; 1.000 km = 0.621 mi: Concurrency terminus

== Kentucky Route 616 ==
Kentucky Route 616
- Location: near Fairview-near Germantown
- Length: 10.119 mi (16.285 km)

Kentucky Route 616 is a 16.009-mile-long (25.764 km) state highway that runs from Kentucky Routes 1029 and 2505 northwest of Fairview to Kentucky Route 875 southwest of Germantown via Abigail.

=== Major intersections ===
County	Location	mi	km	Destinations	Notes
Robertson		0.000	0.000	KY 1029 (Old Blue Lick Road) / KY 2505 south (Mt. Pleasant Road)	Southern terminus; northern terminus of KY 2505; continues as KY 2505 beyond KY 1029
Robertson	Mount Olivet	6.514	10.483	US 62 east (Sardis Road)	South end of US 62 overlap
Robertson	Mount Olivet	6.641	10.688	US 62 west (Sardis Road)	North end of US 62 overlap
Mason	No major junctions				
Bracken	No major junctions				
Mason	No major junctions				
Bracken		16.009	25.764	KY 875 (Bridgeville Road)	Northern terminus
1.000 mi = 1.609 km; 1.000 km = 0.621 mi: Concurrency terminus

== Kentucky Route 617 ==
Kentucky Route 617
- Location: near Kentontown-near Piqua
- Length: 10.119 mi (16.285 km)

Kentucky Route 617 is a 5.363-mile-long (8.631 km) state highway in southwestern Robertson County that runs from U.S. Route 62 east of Kentontown to Kentucky Route 165 and Piqua Lane northwest of Piqua.

=== Major intersections ===
The entire route is in Robertson County.

Location	mi	km	Destinations	Notes
	0.000	0.000	US 62 (Kentontown Road)	Western terminus
	1.032	1.661	KY 1476 east (Thomas Pike)	Western terminus of KY 1476
	5.363	8.631	KY 165 / Piqua Lane	Eastern terminus; continues as Piqua Lane beyond KY 165
1.000 mi = 1.609 km; 1.000 km = 0.621 mi

== Kentucky Route 618 ==
Kentucky Route 618
- Location: Broughtentown-near Spiro
- Length: 10.708 mi (17.233 km)

Kentucky Route 618 is a 10.708-mile-long (17.233 km) state highway that runs from Kentucky Route 1781 at Broughtentown to Kentucky Route 1250 south of Spiro via Dog Walk and Quail.

=== Major intersections ===
County	Location	mi	km	Destinations	Notes
Lincoln	Broughtentown	0.000	0.000	KY 1781	Western terminus
Lincoln		1.937	3.117	KY 39 north	West end of KY 39 overlap
Lincoln	Dog Walk	2.519	4.054	KY 39 south	East end of KY 39 overlap
Rockcastle		3.714	5.977	KY 1650 east (Ottawa Church Road)	Western terminus of KY 1650
Rockcastle		7.105	11.434	KY 328 west (Bee Lick Road)	Eastern terminus of KY 328
Rockcastle	Quail	7.457	12.001	KY 70 (Old Somerset Pike)	
Rockcastle		10.708	17.233	KY 1250 (Spiro Road)	Eastern terminus
1.000 mi = 1.609 km; 1.000 km = 0.621 mi: Concurrency terminus

== Kentucky Route 619 ==
Kentucky Route 619
- Location: near Montpelier
- Length: 19.045 mi (30.650 km)

Kentucky Route 619 is a 19.045-mile-long (30.650 km) state highway in Russell County that runs from Kentucky Route 92 southeast of Montpelier to Kentucky Route 379 in downtown Russell Springs via Rose Crossroads and Jamestown.

=== Major intersections ===
The entire route is in Russell County.

Location	mi	km	Destinations	Notes
	0.000	0.000	KY 92	Western terminus
	2.563	4.125	KY 832 east	Western terminus of KY 832
	3.577	5.757	KY 379 north / KY 3281 south (Warriner Ridge Road)	West end of KY 379 overlap; northern terminus of KY 3281
	4.838	7.786	KY 379 south	East end of KY 379 overlap
	6.329	10.186	KY 3281 (Warriner Ridge Road)	
	9.473	15.245	US 127	
Jamestown	10.179	16.382	US 127 Bus. south (West Cumberland Avenue) / Sunset Drive	West end of US 127 Bus. overlap
Jamestown	10.800– 10.814	17.381– 17.403	US 127 Bus. north (North Main Street) / KY 92 (South Main Street)	East end of US 127 Bus. overlap
	13.085	21.058	KY 1680 south / Nelson Mill Road	Northern terminus of KY 1680
Russell Springs	18.110	29.145	US 127	
Russell Springs	18.842	30.323	Lakeway Drive (KY 3017)	
Russell Springs	19.045	30.650	KY 379 (Main Street)	Eastern terminus
1.000 mi = 1.609 km; 1.000 km = 0.621 mi: Concurrency terminus

== Kentucky Route 621 ==
Kentucky Route 621
- Location: near Auburn-near Franklin
- Length: 9.269 mi (14.917 km)

Kentucky Route 621 is a 9.269-mile-long (14.917 km) state highway in Simpson County that runs from Kentucky Route 103 southeast of Auburn to U.S. Route 31W north of Franklin.

=== Major intersections ===
The entire route is in Simpson County.

Location	mi	km	Destinations	Notes
	0.000	0.000	KY 103 (Middleton Road)	Western terminus
	3.003	4.833	KY 73 south (Morgantown Road)	West end of KY 73 overlap
	3.804	6.122	KY 73 north (Morgantown Road)	East end of KY 73 overlap
	9.269	14.917	US 31W (Bowling Green Road)	Eastern terminus
1.000 mi = 1.609 km; 1.000 km = 0.621 mi: Concurrency terminus

== Kentucky Route 623 ==
Kentucky Route 623
- Location: near Fairfield-near Waterford
- Length: 6.087 mi (9.796 km)

Kentucky Route 623 is a 6.087-mile-long (9.796 km) rural secondary highway in southwestern Spencer County. The highway begins at KY 48 (Highgrove Road) just north of the East Fork of Cox Creek, which forms the Spencer–Nelson county line. KY 623 heads north as Lilly Pike, which crosses the Salt River on its way to its north end at KY 44 (Mount Washington Road) east of Waterford.

=== Major intersections ===
The entire route is in Spencer County.

Location	mi	km	Destinations	Notes
	0.000	0.000	KY 48 (Highgrove Road)	Southern terminus
	6.087	9.796	KY 44 (Mt. Washington Road)	Northern terminus
1.000 mi = 1.609 km; 1.000 km = 0.621 mi: Concurrency terminus

== Kentucky Route 624 ==
Kentucky Route 624
- Location: Cerulean-near Bainbridge
- Length: 5.064 mi (8.150 km)

Kentucky Route 624 is a 5.064-mile-long (8.150 km) state highway in far northeastern Trigg County and far northwestern Christian County that runs from Kentucky Routes 124 and 126 in Cerulean to Kentucky Route 91 and Old Princeton Road southeast of Bainbridge.

=== Major intersections ===
County	Location	mi	km	Destinations	Notes
Trigg	Cerulean	0.000	0.000	KY 124 / KY 126 (Main Street)	Western terminus
Christian		5.064	8.150	KY 91 (Princeton Road) / Old Princeton Road	Eastern terminus
1.000 mi = 1.609 km; 1.000 km = 0.621 mi

== Kentucky Route 625 ==
Kentucky Route 625
- Location: Bedford-Milton
- Length: 12.215 mi (19.658 km)

Kentucky Route 625 is a 5.064-mile-long (8.150 km) state highway in western Trimble County that runs to and from U.S. Route 421 via Mount Pleasant and Trout.Between Corn Creek Road and US-421 this route is closed to Trucks due to the tight switchbacks and narrow nature of the road.

=== Major intersections ===
The entire route is in Trimble County.

Location	mi	km	Destinations	Notes
Bedford city line	0.000	0.000	US 421 (Main Street)	Southern terminus
	3.809	6.130	KY 2869 west (Conner Ridge Road)	Eastern terminus of KY 2869
Trout	6.209	9.992	KY 1838 south (Corn Creek Road)	Northern terminus of KY 1838
	11.990	19.296	KY 1256 south (Liberty Road)	Northern terminus of KY 1256
Milton	12.215	19.658	US 421	Northern terminus
1.000 mi = 1.609 km; 1.000 km = 0.621 mi

== Kentucky Route 626 ==
Kentucky Route 626
- Location: Boston–Rockland
- Length: 17.954 mi (28.894 km)

Kentucky Route 626 is a 17.954-mile-long (28.894 km) rural secondary highway in southeastern Butler County and western Warren County. The L-shaped highway begins at a three-legged intersection with KY 1153, which heads west as Berry's Lick Road and north as Sandy Creek Road. KY 626 heads east along Berry's Lick Road through Turnertown, also known as Berry's Lick. The highway crosses Flat Rock Branch of Muddy Creek and intersects KY 79 (Russellville Road) at Davis Crossroads. KY 626 crosses Neils Creek west of Sharer, where the route has a brief concurrency with KY 1083 (Sugar Grove Road). The highway crosses the Butler–Warren county line and continues east on Jackson Bridge Road. KY 626 crosses the Gasper River and turns north at its junction with KY 2632 (Hammet Hill Road). The highway joins US 231 (Morgantown Road) to cross back over the Gasper River and turns north onto Highland Church Road at Hadley. KY 626 crosses William H. Natcher Parkway; on either side of the parkway, the route meets the eastern ends of a pair of frontage roads, KY 6140 (Frontage Road) and KY 6139 (Clifty Creek Frontage Road) on the north. The highway reaches its eastern terminus at KY 1435 (Barren River Road) at Rockland.

=== Major intersections ===
County	Location	mi	km	Destinations	Notes
Butler		0.000	0.000	KY 1153 (Berry's Lick Road / Sandy Creek Road)	Western terminus
Butler	Davis Crossroads	3.380	5.440	KY 79 (Russellville Road)	
Butler		7.878	12.678	KY 1083 south (Sugar Grove Road)	West end of KY 1083 overlap
Butler		8.050	12.955	KY 1083 north (Sugar Grove Road)	East end of KY 1083 overlap
Warren		12.422	19.991	KY 2632 east (Hammett Hill Road)	Western terminus of KY 2632
Warren		14.465	23.279	US 231 south (Morgantown Road)	West end of US 231 overlap
Warren		15.538	25.006	US 231 north (Morgantown Road) / Hadley School Road	East end of US 231 overlap
Warren		16.044	25.820	KY 6139 north (Clifty Hollow Road)	Southern terminus of KY 6139
Warren		17.954	28.894	KY 1435 (Barren River Road)	Eastern terminus
1.000 mi = 1.609 km; 1.000 km = 0.621 mi: Concurrency terminus

== Kentucky Route 628 ==
Kentucky Route 628
- Location: near Ayers-Pleasant View
- Length: 5.225 mi (8.409 km)

Kentucky Route 628 is a 5.225-mile-long (8.409 km) state highway in southwestern Whitley County that runs from a dead end along Wolf Creek northeast of Ayres to U.S. Route 25W and Stringtown Road in Pleasant View.

=== Major intersections ===
The entire route is in Whitley County.

Location	mi	km	Destinations	Notes
	0.000	0.000	Dead end	Western terminus
	4.351	7.002	KY 2996 south (Wolf Creek River Road)	Northern terminus of KY 2996
Pleasant View	5.225	8.409	US 25W / Stringtown Road	Eastern terminus; continues as Stringtown Road beyond US 25W
1.000 mi = 1.609 km; 1.000 km = 0.621 mi

== Kentucky Route 629 ==
Kentucky Route 629
- Location: near Fordsville
- Length: 19.653 mi (31.628 km)
- Existed: 1987–present

Kentucky Route 629 is a 19.653-mile-long (31.628 km) state highway in far eastern Ohio County and western Breckinridge County that runs from Kentucky Route 54 southeast of Fordsville to Kentucky Route 992 southeast of Mattingly via Rockvale.

=== Major intersections ===
County	Location	mi	km	Destinations	Notes
Ohio		0.000	0.000	KY 54	Southern terminus
Breckinridge		14.016	22.557	KY 261	
Breckinridge		19.653	31.628	KY 992	Northern terminus
1.000 mi = 1.609 km; 1.000 km = 0.621 mi

== Kentucky Route 630 ==
Kentucky Route 630
- Location: near Manitou-Dixon
- Length: 15.081 mi (24.271 km)
- Existed: 1987–present

Kentucky Route 630 is a 15.081-mile-long (24.271 km) state highway in northern Hopkins County and south central Webster County that runs from Kentucky Route 262 and John Hardy Road south of Manitou to Kentucky Route 132 on the eastern Dixon city line via Manitou and Vanderburg.

=== Major intersections ===
County	Location	mi	km	Destinations	Notes
Hopkins		0.000	0.000	KY 262 east / John Hardy Road	Southern terminus; western terminus of KY 262
Hopkins		0.592	0.953	KY 1034 (Rose Creek Road)	
Hopkins	Manitou	2.040	3.283	US 41 Alt. south (Nebo Road)	South end of US 41 Alt. overlap
Hopkins	Manitou	2.250	3.621	US 41 Alt. north (Nebo Road)	North end of US 41 Alt. overlap
Webster		9.713	15.632	KY 120 east	South end of KY 120 overlap
Webster		10.046	16.167	KY 120 west	North end of KY 120 overlap
Webster	Dixon city line	15.081	24.271	KY 132 (Leiper Street)	Northern terminus
1.000 mi = 1.609 km; 1.000 km = 0.621 mi: Concurrency terminus

== Kentucky Route 631 ==
Kentucky Route 631
- Location: near Short Creek
- Length: 7.758 mi (12.485 km)
- Existed: 1993–present

Kentucky Route 631 is a 15.081-mile-long (24.271 km) rural secondary state highway in Grayson County that runs to and from Kentucky Route 54 east and southeast of Short Creek via Duff.

== Kentucky Route 633 ==
Kentucky Route 633
- Location: near Coburg
- Length: 1.689 mi (2.718 km)

Kentucky Route 633 is a 1.689-mile-long (2.718 km) supplemental state highway in far northwestern Adair County that runs from Cane Valley Road at the Taylor County line to Kentucky Route 55 and Cane Valley Church Road south of Coburg.

=== History ===
The road originally ran from KY 61 east via KY 767 and north via Skinhouse Branch Road (former KY 2188). The road was extended east via KY 1913 to KY 1386, and replaced a section of it southeast to KY 61. By the 1970s, the road was truncated, with KY 767 and KY 1913 (which replaced the remainder of KY 1386 which was reassigned to a road in Scottsville) taking over parts of it and the separated section redesignated as KY 2188.

== Kentucky Route 634 ==
Kentucky Route 634
- Location: near Spurlington-near Jessietown
- Length: 2.808 mi (4.519 km)

Kentucky Route 634 is a 2.808-mile-long (4.519 km) rural secondary state highway in far northern Taylor County and far southern Marion County that runs from Kentucky Route 744 northwest of Spurlington to Kentucky Route 289 southwest of Jessietown.

== Kentucky Route 636 ==
Kentucky Route 636
- Location: near Mount Eden–near Harrisonville
- Length: 9.033 mi (14.537 km)

Kentucky Route 636 is a 9.033-mile-long (14.537 km) rural secondary highway in northeastern Spencer County and southeastern Shelby County. The highway begins at KY 248 (Briar Ridge Road) east of Taylorsville Lake. KY 636 heads north along Van Buren Road, which crosses Little Beech Creek on its way to Mount Eden, which sits on the Spencer–Shelby county line. The highway meets the eastern end of KY 1795 (Mill Road) on the Spencer County side and intersects KY 44 (Mount Eden Road) on the Shelby County side. KY 636 continues northeast as Back Creek Road, which crosses and briefly parallels another Little Beech Creek. The highway passes through Junte before reaching its northern terminus at KY 395 (Waddy Road) west of Harrisonville.

=== Major intersections ===
County	Location	mi	km	Destinations	Notes
Spencer		0.000	0.000	KY 248 (Briar Ridge Road) / Van Buren Road	Southern terminus; continues as Van Buren Road beyond KY 248
Spencer	Mount Eden	3.566	5.739	KY 1795 west (Mill Road) / Marvin Nethery Road	Eastern terminus of KY 1795
Shelby	Mount Eden	3.620	5.826	KY 44 / KY 53 (Mt Eden Road)	
Shelby		9.033	14.537	KY 395 (Waddy Road)	Northern terminus
1.000 mi = 1.609 km; 1.000 km = 0.621 mi

== Kentucky Route 637 ==
Kentucky Route 637
- Location: Waddy
- Existed: by 1981

Kentucky Route 637 was a state Highway in Shelby County. It ran from KY 395 in Waddy southeast to KY 1472. The road was given to Shelby County by August 3, 1981, but was restored on April 8, 1987, as KY 2867.

== Kentucky Route 638 ==
Kentucky Route 638
- Location: London-Manchester
- Length: 27.729 mi (44.625 km)

Kentucky Route 638 is a 27.729-mile-long (44.625 km) rural secondary highway in northeastern Laurel County and western Clay County that runs from Kentucky Route 80 in eastern London to U.S. Route 421 and Kentucky Route 11 in far northern Manchester via McWhorter, Larue, Fogertown, and Grace.

=== Major intersections ===
County	Location	mi	km	Destinations	Notes
Laurel	London	0.000	0.000	KY 80 (East Fourth Street)	Western terminus
Laurel	London	0.766	1.233	Hal Rogers Parkway – London, Hazard	
Laurel		3.252	5.234	KY 586 south (Old Salem Road)	Northern terminus of KY 586
Laurel		8.615	13.864	KY 578 west (McWhorter-Victory Road)	West end of KY 578 overlap
Laurel	McWhorter	9.449	15.207	KY 578 east (Terrells Creek Road)	East end of KY 578 overlap
Laurel		10.872	17.497	KY 3435 south (Langnau Road)	Northern terminus of KY 3435
Laurel		13.682	22.019	KY 472 west (Johnson Road)	West end of KY 472 overlap
Laurel		13.825	22.249	KY 472 east (Johnson Road)	East end of KY 472 overlap
Clay	Fogertown	17.310	27.858	KY 472 west	West end of KY 472 overlap
Clay		17.702	28.489	KY 472 east	East end of KY 472 overlap
Clay		21.359	34.374	KY 3476 south (Grayfork Road)	Northern terminus of KY 3476
Clay		24.966	40.179	KY 3473 east (Island Creek-Sizemore Road)	Western terminus of KY 3473
Clay	Manchester	27.729	44.625	US 421 / KY 11 (Richmond Road)	Eastern terminus
1.000 mi = 1.609 km; 1.000 km = 0.621 mi: Concurrency terminus

== Kentucky Route 639 ==
Kentucky Route 639
- Location: near Shipley-near Snow

Kentucky Route 639 is a 27.729-mile-long (44.625 km) rural secondary highway in western Clinton County that runs from Kentucky Route 553 west of Shipley to Kentucky Route 734 northwest of Snow via Wago.

=== History ===
KY 639 was formed by 1954.

The original KY 639 ran from KY 558 to KY 90 north of Albany; this was decommissioned, but later reinstated as KY 2063.

=== Major intersections ===
The entire route is in Clinton County.

Location	mi	km	Destinations	Notes
	0.000	0.000	KY 553 (Wisdom Dock Road)	Southern terminus
	4.958	7.979	KY 1590 (Burkesville Road)	
	8.072	12.991	KY 90	
	8.468	13.628	US 127	
	9.428	15.173	KY 1553 north	Southern terminus of KY 1553
	9.714	15.633	KY 734	Northern terminus
1.000 mi = 1.609 km; 1.000 km = 0.621 mi

== Kentucky Route 640 ==
Kentucky Route 640
- Location: Summer Shade–Knob Lick
- Length: 16.723 mi (26.913 km)

Kentucky Route 640 is a 16.723-mile-long (26.913 km) rural secondary highway in western Metcalfe County. The highway begins at KY 90 (Summer Shade Road) at Summer Shade. KY 640 heads north along Randolph Summer Shade Road. The highway curves west and crossing Falling Timber Creek and meets the eastern end of KY 1330 (Kino Road) very close to the Metcalfe–Barren county line. KY 640 continues northeast to Randolph, where the route turns north at the north terminus of KY 2387 (Randolph Goodluck Road) and meets the west end of KY 861 (Randolph Road). KY 640 follows Wisdom Road north to its intersection with KY 3234 (Old Glasgow Road) just south of the route's underpass of the Cumberland Expressway. The highway continues as Wisdom Knob Lick Road through an intersection with US 68 (Glasgow Road) at Wisdom to its northern terminus at KY 70 (Sulphur Well Knob Lick Road) west of Knob Lick.

=== Major intersections ===
The entire route is in Metcalfe County.

Location	mi	km	Destinations	Notes
Summer Shade	0.000	0.000	KY 90 (Summer Shade Road)	Southern terminus
	5.477	8.814	KY 1330 west (Kino Road)	Eastern terminus of KY 1330
Randolph	8.546	13.753	KY 2387 south (Randolph-Goodluck Road)	Northern terminus of KY 2387
	8.678	13.966	KY 861 east (Randolph Road)	Western terminus of KY 861
	10.615	17.083	KY 3234 east (Old Glasgow Road)	Western terminus of KY 3234
Wisdom	11.053	17.788	US 68 / KY 80 (Glasgow Road)	
	16.723	26.913	KY 70 (Sulphur Well-Knob Lick Road) / KY 2435 west (McCandless Corner Road)	Northern terminus; eastern terminus of KY 2435; continues as KY 2435 beyond KY 70
1.000 mi = 1.609 km; 1.000 km = 0.621 mi

== Kentucky Route 642 ==
Kentucky Route 642
- Location: near Lancaster
- Existed: 1997

Kentucky Route 642 was a state Highway in Garrard County. It ran from KY 39 southeast of Lancaster southwest via Gilberts Creek Road and Goshen Road to US 150 in Stanford. The section south of the Lincoln/Garrard County Line was given to Lincoln County by August 15, 1980; the remainder (along with intersecting KY 2252, the number for the rest of Gilberts Creek Road) was given to Garrard County on August 4, 1997.

== Kentucky Route 643 ==
Kentucky Route 643
- Location: near Halls Gap-Crab Orchard

Kentucky Route 643 is a 16.723-mile-long (26.913 km) rural secondary highway in eastern Lincoln County that runs from U.S. Route 27 and Kentucky Route 1247 south of Halls Gap to Kentucky Route 39 in downtown Crab Orchard via Ottenheim.

=== Major intersections ===
The entire route is in Lincoln County.

Location	mi	km	Destinations	Notes
	0.000	0.000	US 27 south / KY 1247 (Somerset Road)	Western terminus; west end of KY 1247 overlap
	0.240	0.386	KY 1247 north	East end of KY 1247 overlap
Ottenheim	4.199	6.758	KY 1948 south	Northern terminus of KY 1948
	7.587	12.210	KY 1781 west / Mount Olive Cemetery Road	Eastern terminus of KY 1781
	11.281	18.155	KY 1770 west	Eastern terminus of KY 1770
	11.332	18.237	US 150	
Crab Orchard	12.180	19.602	KY 39 (Main Street)	Eastern terminus
1.000 mi = 1.609 km; 1.000 km = 0.621 mi

== Kentucky Route 646 ==
Kentucky Route 646
- Location: Jeffersonville-near Mount Sterling
- Length: 16.349 mi (26.311 km)
- Existed: 1987–present

Kentucky Route 646 is a 16.349-mile-long (26.311 km) rural secondary highway in western Montgomery County and far southeastern Clark County that runs from Kentucky Route 213 in far southern Jeffersonville to Kentucky Route 713 southeast of Mount Sterling via Trimble and Bogy-Chennault.

=== Major intersections ===
County	Location	mi	km	Destinations	Notes
Montgomery	Jeffersonville	0.000	0.000	KY 213	Southern terminus
Montgomery	Trimble	2.232	3.592	KY 3363 south (Sawmill Road) / Camargo-Levee Road	Northern terminus of KY 3363
Montgomery		4.619	7.434	KY 11 north (Levee Road)	South end of KY 11 overlap
Montgomery		4.731	7.614	KY 11 south (Levee Road)	North end of KY 11 overlap
Clark		7.830	12.601	KY 1960 west (Kiddville Road)	Eastern terminus of KY 1960
Montgomery		12.146	19.547	KY 11 south (Levee Road)	South end of KY 11 overlap
Montgomery		12.519	20.147	KY 11 north (Levee Road)	North end of KY 11 overlap
Montgomery		14.535	23.392	US 460 east (Camargo Road)	South end of US 460 overlap
Montgomery		14.604	23.503	US 460 west (Camargo Road)	North end of US 460 overlap
Montgomery		16.349	26.311	KY 713 (Spencer Road)	Northern terminus
1.000 mi = 1.609 km; 1.000 km = 0.621 mi: Concurrency terminus

== Kentucky Route 647 ==
Kentucky Route 647
- Location: Mt. Sterling
- Existed: 1997

Kentucky Route 647 was a state Highway in Montgomery County. It ran from US 60 in Mt. Sterling northeast via Old Owingsville Road. The road was given to Montgomery County on September 26, 1997.

== Kentucky Route 648 ==
Kentucky Route 648
- Location: near Millersburg
- Length: 3.630 mi (5.842 km)
- Existed: 2012–present

Kentucky Route 648 is a 3.630-mile-long (5.842 km) supplemental state highway in far northeastern Bourbon County and northwestern Nicholas County that runs from Kentucky Route 1879 to U.S. Route 68 north of Millersburg.

== Kentucky Route 649 ==
Kentucky Route 649
- Location: near Ault-near Ibex
- Length: 3.630 mi (5.842 km)
- Existed: 1987–present

Kentucky Route 649 is a 3.630-mile-long (5.842 km) state highway in northern Elliott County that runs from Kentucky Route 504 east of Ault to Mobley Flats Road and Ibex Post Office Road northeast of Ibex via Beartown and Stark.

=== Major intersections ===
The entire route is in Elliott County.

Location	mi	km	Destinations	Notes
	0.000	0.000	KY 504	Western terminus
	8.778	14.127	KY 504 north	West end of KY 504 overlap
	9.120	14.677	KY 504 south	East end of KY 504 overlap
	11.678	18.794	Mobley Flats Road / Ibex Post Office Road	Eastern terminus
1.000 mi = 1.609 km; 1.000 km = 0.621 mi: Concurrency terminus

== Kentucky Route 650 ==
Kentucky Route 650
- Location: near Lenox-near The Ridge
- Length: 3.630 mi (5.842 km)

Kentucky Route 650 is a 3.630-mile-long (5.842 km) rural secondary state highway in eastern Morgan County that runs from Kentucky Route 172 east of Lenox to Kentucky Route 755 southeast of The Ridge via Wells Creek, Bascom, and Faye.

=== Major intersections ===
County	Location	mi	km	Destinations	Notes
Morgan		0.000	0.000	KY 172	Southern terminus
Elliott		8.562	13.779	KY 7 north	South end of KY 7 overlap
Elliott		9.021	14.518	KY 7 south	North end of KY 7 overlap
Elliott		11.504	18.514	KY 755 (South Ruin Road)	Northern terminus
1.000 mi = 1.609 km; 1.000 km = 0.621 mi: Concurrency terminus

== Kentucky Route 651 ==
Kentucky Route 651
- Location: near Campton
- Length: 2.207 mi (3.552 km)

Kentucky Route 651 is a 2.207-mile-long (3.552 km) supplemental state highway in western Wolfe County that runs from a point along Sandy Ridge Road to Kentucky Route 15 southwest of Campton.

=== Major intersections ===
The entire route is in Wolfe County.

Location	mi	km	Destinations	Notes
	0.000	0.000	Sandy Ridge Road	Southern terminus; continues beyond as Sandy Ridge Road
	2.020	3.251	KY 3355 east (Bear Pen Creek Road)	Western terminus of KY 3355
	2.207	3.552	KY 15	Northern terminus
1.000 mi = 1.609 km; 1.000 km = 0.621 mi

== Kentucky Route 652 ==
Kentucky Route 652
- Location: Fairfield-near Taylorsville
- Length: 6.623 mi (10.659 km)

Kentucky Route 652 is a 6.623-mile-long (10.659 km) state highway in far northeastern Nelson County and southwestern Spencer County that runs from Kentucky Route 48 in downtown Fairfield to Kentucky Route 55 south of Taylorsville.

=== Major intersections ===
County	Location	mi	km	Destinations	Notes
Nelson	Fairfield	0.000	0.000	KY 48 (Highgrove Road)	Southern terminus
Spencer		2.338	3.763	KY 2885 north (Bowman Lane)	Southern terminus of KY 2885
Spencer		6.623	10.659	KY 55 (Bloomfield Road)	Northern terminus
1.000 mi = 1.609 km; 1.000 km = 0.621 mi

== Kentucky Route 653 ==
Kentucky Route 653
- Location: Sassafras Ridge
- Length: 1.724 mi (2.775 km)

Kentucky Route 653 is a 6.623-mile-long (10.659 km) rural secondary state highway in southwestern Fulton County that runs from Kentucky Route 94 and Cotton Gin Road to Ash Log Road and Davis Road near Sassafras Ridge.

=== Major intersections ===
The entire route is in Fulton County.

Location	mi	km	Destinations	Notes
Sassafras Ridge	0.000	0.000	KY 94 / Cotton Gin Road	Southern terminus
Sassafras Ridge	0.020	0.032	KY 971 south	Northern terminus of KY 971
	1.724	2.775	Ash Log Road / Davis Road	Northern terminus; continues as Davis Road beyond Ash Log Road
1.000 mi = 1.609 km; 1.000 km = 0.621 mi

== Kentucky Route 654 ==
Kentucky Route 654
- Location: Tribune-near Mattoon
- Length: 8.262 mi (13.296 km)

Kentucky Route 654 is a 8.262-mile-long (13.296 km) rural secondary state highway in eastern Crittenden County that runs from Kentucky Route 120 at Tribune to Baker Hollow Road and Weston Road northwest of Mattoon via Mattoon.

=== Major intersections ===
The entire route is in Crittenden County.

Location	mi	km	Destinations	Notes
Tribune	0.000	0.000	KY 120	Southern terminus
	4.344	6.991	US 60	
	5.290	8.513	KY 1901 south (Seminary Loop Road)	Northern terminus of KY 1901
	8.262	13.296	Baker Hollow Road / Weston Road	Northern terminus
1.000 mi = 1.609 km; 1.000 km = 0.621 mi

== Kentucky Route 655 ==
Kentucky Route 655
- Location: Windyville
- Length: 9.214 mi (14.828 km)
- Existed: by 1973–present

Kentucky Route 655 is a 9.214-mile-long (14.828 km) rural secondary highway in western Edmonson County. The C-shaped highway begins at KY 70 (Morgantown Road) northwest of Windyville. KY 655 follows Segal Road west across Gulf Creek and then south through Segal and east through Asphalt. The highway continues northeast to its terminus at KY 70 at Windyville.

=== History ===
KY 655 was formed by 1973, replacing all of KY 555 from KY 70 southwest to Segal and part of KY 67 northeast of Segal.

The original KY 655 ran from KY 344 (now KY 106) north of Elkton east via Hadden Mill Road to KY 1384 (now Miller Valley Road); all three roads were decommissioned by 1973.

== Kentucky Route 656 ==
Kentucky Route 656
- Location: near Garrett
- Length: 1.463 mi (2.354 km)

Kentucky Route 656 is a 1.463-mile-long (2.354 km) supplemental state highway in south central Meade County that runs from Kentucky Route 1238 to Kentucky Route 333 south of Garrett.

== Kentucky Route 657 ==
Kentucky Route 657
- Location: near Scythia-Lewisport
- Length: 9.302 mi (14.970 km)

Kentucky Route 657 is a 9.302-mile-long (14.970 km) rural secondary highway in far northeastern Daviess County and northwestern Hancock County that runs from Kentucky Route 1389 east of Scythia to Kentucky Route 334 and Pell Street in downtown Lewisport.

=== Major intersections ===
County	Location	mi	km	Destinations	Notes
Daviess		0.000	0.000	KY 1389	Southern terminus
Hancock		2.454	3.949	KY 662 west	Eastern terminus of KY 662
Hancock		4.313	6.941	KY 1403 south	Northern terminus of KY 1403
Hancock		6.106	9.827	KY 661 south	Northern terminus of KY 661
Hancock	Lewisport	8.310	13.374	US 60 – Hawesville, Owensboro	
Hancock	Lewisport	9.302	14.970	KY 334 (Pell Street / Fourth Street) / Pell Street	Northern terminus
1.000 mi = 1.609 km; 1.000 km = 0.621 mi

== Kentucky Route 659 ==
Kentucky Route 659
- Location: near Mannsville
- Length: 7.968 mi (12.823 km)
- Existed: 1987–present

Kentucky Route 659 is a 7.968-mile-long (12.823 km) rural secondary highway in eastern Taylor County that runs from Kentucky Route 70 east of Mannsville to KY 70 again along with Kentucky Route 1752 southwest of Bass.

== Kentucky Route 660 ==
Kentucky Route 660
- Location: Louisville-near Mt. Washington
- Length: 3.087 mi (4.968 km)

Kentucky Route 660 is a 3.087-mile-long (4.968 km) rural secondary highway in far southern Jefferson County and northeastern Bullitt County that runs from U.S. Route 31E to Kentucky Route 1319 north of Mt. Washington.

== Kentucky Route 661 ==
Kentucky Route 661
- Location: near Yelvington
- Length: 2.846 mi (4.580 km)

Kentucky Route 661 is a 2.846-mile-long (4.580 km) rural secondary highway in far northeastern Daviess County and far northwestern Hancock County that runs from Kentucky Route 662 to Kentucky Route 657 northeast of Yelvington.

== Kentucky Route 662 ==
Kentucky Route 662
- Location: Yelvington
- Length: 5.231 mi (8.418 km)

Kentucky Route 662 is a 5.231-mile-long (8.418 km) rural secondary highway in northeastern Daviess County and far northwestern Hancock County that runs from Kentucky Route 405 in Yelvington to Kentucky Route 657 northeast of Yelvington.

=== Major intersections ===
County	Location	mi	km	Destinations	Notes
Daviess	Yelvington	0.000	0.000	KY 405	Western terminus
Daviess		3.617	5.821	KY 661 north	Southern terminus of KY 661
Hancock		5.231	8.418	KY 657	Eastern terminus
1.000 mi = 1.609 km; 1.000 km = 0.621 mi

== Kentucky Route 663 ==
Kentucky Route 663
- Location: near Adairville-near Auburn
- Length: 19.985 mi (32.163 km)

Kentucky Route 663 is a 19.985-mile-long (32.163 km) rural secondary state highway in southeastern Logan County that runs from U.S. Route 431 and Mortimer Road north of Adairville to Kentucky Route 103 south of Auburn via Schochoh and Corinth.

=== Major intersections ===
The entire route is in Logan County.

Location	mi	km	Destinations	Notes
	0.000	0.000	US 431 (Nashville Road) / Mortimer Road	Southern terminus; continues as Mortimer Road beyond US 431
	3.907	6.288	KY 1308 south (Trimble Road)	Northern terminus of KY 1308
Schochoh	4.379	7.047	KY 664 east (Sulphur Springs Road)	South end of KY 664 overlap
Schochoh	4.445	7.154	KY 664 west (Halls Store Road)	North end of KY 664 overlap
	10.659	17.154	KY 100 west (Franklin Road)	South end of KY 100 overlap
	11.354	18.272	KY 2369 north (Dennis-Corinth Road)	Southern terminus of KY 2369
	12.901	20.762	KY 100 east (Franklin Road)	North end of KY 100 overlap
	19.985	32.163	KY 103 (Logan-Middleton Road)	Northern terminus
1.000 mi = 1.609 km; 1.000 km = 0.621 mi: Concurrency terminus

== Kentucky Route 664 ==
Kentucky Route 664
- Location: near Oakville-near Franklin
- Length: 14.894 mi (23.970 km)

Kentucky Route 664 is a 14.894-mile-long (23.970 km) rural secondary state highway in southeastern Logan County and southwestern Simpson County that runs from U.S. Route 431 northeast of Oakville to Kentucky Route 383 southwest of Franklin via Schochoh and Neosheo.

=== Major intersections ===
County	Location	mi	km	Destinations	Notes
Logan		0.000	0.000	US 431 (Nashville Road)	Western terminus
Logan	Schochoh	5.405	8.699	KY 663 north (Corinth Road)	West end of KY 663 overlap
Logan	Schochoh	5.471	8.805	KY 663 south (Schochoh Road)	East end of KY 663 overlap
Logan		7.298	11.745	KY 765 south (Conn Road) / Ben Fugate Road	Northern terminus of KY 765
Simpson		9.735	15.667	KY 665 north (George Taylor Road)	Southern terminus of KY 665
Simpson	Neosheo	12.277	19.758	KY 1885 west (Neosheo-Prices Mill Road)	Eastern terminus of KY 1885
Simpson		14.894	23.970	KY 383 (Springfield Road)	Eastern terminus
1.000 mi = 1.609 km; 1.000 km = 0.621 mi: Concurrency terminus

== Kentucky Route 665 ==
Kentucky Route 665
- Location: near Middleton
- Length: 1.404 mi (2.260 km)

Kentucky Route 665 is a 1.404-mile-long (2.260 km) rural secondary state highway in southwestern Simpson County that runs from Kentucky Route 664 to Kentucky Route 100 and George Taylor Road southeast of Middleton.

== Kentucky Route 666 ==
Kentucky Route 666
- Location: near Raleigh-near Chapman
- Length: 1.404 mi (2.260 km)

Kentucky Route 666 is a 1.404-mile-long (2.260 km) supplemental state highway in northern Union County that runs from Kentucky Route 871 northeast of Raleigh to Kentucky Route 130 north of Chapman.

=== Major intersections ===
The entire route is in Union County.

Location	mi	km	Destinations	Notes
	0.000	0.000	KY 871	Western terminus
	3.997	6.433	KY 360 west	West end of KY 360 overlap
	4.200	6.759	KY 360 east	East end of KY 360 overlap
	7.215	11.611	KY 130 (Airline Road)	Eastern terminus
1.000 mi = 1.609 km; 1.000 km = 0.621 mi: Concurrency terminus

== Kentucky Route 667 ==
Kentucky Route 667
- Location: Dekoven-near Raleigh
- Length: 16.544 mi (26.625 km)

Kentucky Route 667 is a 16.544-mile-long (26.625 km) supplemental state highway in western Union County that runs from Kentucky Routes 492 and 1508 in Dekoven to Kentucky Route 871 southeast of Raleigh via Curlew, Balckburn, and Raleigh.

=== Major intersections ===
The entire route is in Union County.

Location	mi	km	Destinations	Notes
Dekoven	0.000	0.000	KY 1508 / KY 492 north	Southern terminus; southern terminus of KY 492
	5.744	9.244	KY 668 east	Western terminus of KY 668
	11.213	18.046	KY 56	
	16.544	26.625	KY 871	Northern terminus
1.000 mi = 1.609 km; 1.000 km = 0.621 mi

== Kentucky Route 668 ==
Kentucky Route 668
- Location: near Henshaw
- Length: 3.078 mi (4.954 km)

Kentucky Route 668 is a 3.078-mile-long (4.954 km) supplemental state highway in northwestern Union County that runs from Kentucky Route 667 to Kentucky Route 109 northwest of Henshaw.

== Kentucky Route 669 ==
Kentucky Route 669
- Location: Waverly-near Hitesville
- Length: 3.078 mi (4.954 km)

Kentucky Route 669 is a 3.078-mile-long (4.954 km) supplemental state highway in eastern Union County that runs from a point along East Market Street near St. Peter's Catholic Church in southeastern Waverly to Locust Lane and Yancy Greenwell Road southeast of Hitesville via Waverly.

=== Major intersections ===
The entire route is in Union County.

Location	mi	km	Destinations	Notes
Waverly	0.000	0.000	East Market Street	Southern terminus; continues as East Market Street beyond point
Waverly	0.238	0.383	North Maple Street (KY 2094)	
Waverly	0.337	0.542	US 60	
	2.561	4.122	Locust Lane / Yancy Greenwell Road	Northern terminus; continues as Yancy Greenwell Road beyond Locust Lane
1.000 mi = 1.609 km; 1.000 km = 0.621 mi

== Kentucky Route 671 ==
Kentucky Route 671
- Location: Oak Forest-near Maynard
- Length: 4.570 mi (7.355 km)

Kentucky Route 671 is a 4.570-mile-long (7.355 km) rural secondary state highway in southeastern Allen County that runs from Kentucky Route 100 at Oak Forest to Kentucky Route 98 southeast of Maynard.

=== History ===
KY 671 was formed in 1954.

The original KY 671 ran from KY 109 in Christian County north via Hart Road to end state maintenance.

== Kentucky Route 672 ==
Kentucky Route 672
- Location: near Cobb-near Dawson Springs
- Length: 14.340 mi (23.078 km)

Kentucky Route 672 is a 14.340-mile-long (23.078 km) supplemental state highway in southeastern Caldwell County that runs from Kentucky Routes 126 and 128 southwest of Cobb to U.S. Route 62 southwest of Dawson Springs via Cobb.

=== Major intersections ===
The entire route is in Caldwell County.

Location	mi	km	Destinations	Notes
	0.000	0.000	KY 126 / KY 128 (Wallonia Road)	Southern terminus
	4.410	7.097	KY 91 (Hopkinsville Road)	
	7.033	11.319	KY 278 west (Sandlick Road)	Eastern terminus of KY 278
	12.753	20.524	Spillway Road (KY 2066 east)	Western terminus of KY 2066
	14.202	22.856	KY 1627 west (Mt. Hebron Church Road)	Eastern terminus of KY 1627
	14.340	23.078	US 62 (Dawson Road)	Northern terminus
1.000 mi = 1.609 km; 1.000 km = 0.621 mi

== Kentucky Route 673 ==
Kentucky Route 673
- Location: Flemingsburg

Kentucky Route 673 was a state highway in Fleming County. It ran from KY 11 (now Bus. KY 11) in Flemingsburg north to KY 24 (now Mill Creek Road). The road was extended north replacing part of KY 24 to KY 597 when KY 24 was decommissioned. However, the section of KY 597 east on Mt. Gilead Road was removed by 1977, and KY 597 was rerouted south, replacing KY 673.

== Kentucky Route 674 ==
Kentucky Route 674
- Location: near Parnell
- Length: 4.205 mi (6.767 km)
- Existed: 1987–present

Kentucky Route 674 is a 4.205-mile-long (6.767 km) rural secondary state highway in northwestern Wayne County that runs from a point along Bugwood Road to Kentucky Route 92 northwest of Parnell.

== Kentucky Route 675 ==
Kentucky Route 675
- Location: Auburn-Gasper

Kentucky Route 675 was a state highway in Logan County. It was formed by 1957, and ran from KY 103 in Auburn north to KY 1038 in Gasper via Liberty Church Road. The road was given to the county by 1977.

The original KY 675 ran from US 62 near Broadwell to US 27 in Lair, and became part of KY 982 when it was extended west.

== Kentucky Route 677 ==
Kentucky Route 677
- Location: near Center-near Canmer
- Length: 16.735 mi (26.932 km)

Kentucky Route 677 is a 16.735-mile-long (26.932 km) rural secondary state highway in northwestern Metcalfe County, far northeastern Barren County, and TBA that runs from Kentucky Route 314 southwest of Center to U.S. Route 31E northeast of Canmer via Three Springs, Monroe, and Defries.

=== Major intersections ===
County	Location	mi	km	Destinations	Notes
Metcalfe		0.000	0.000	KY 314 (Hiseville-Center Road)	Southern terminus
Hart		3.435	5.528	KY 740 south (Hiseville-Park Road)	South end of KY 740 overlap
Hart	Three Springs	3.637	5.853	KY 218 west (Legrande Highway)	North end of KY 740 overlap; south end of KY 218 overlap; northern terminus of KY 740
Hart		4.033	6.490	KY 218 east (Legrande Highway)	North end of KY 218 overlap
Hart	Monroe	8.849	14.241	KY 88 (Hardyville Road)	
Hart		10.179	16.382	KY 1572 west (Rube Smith Road) / Dishman Cemetery Road	Eastern terminus of KY 1572
Hart		15.490	24.929	KY 1573 south (Hedgepeth Road)	Northern terminus of KY 1573
Hart		16.735	26.932	US 31E (North Jackson Highway)	Northern terminus
1.000 mi = 1.609 km; 1.000 km = 0.621 mi: Concurrency terminus

== Kentucky Route 678 ==
Kentucky Route 678
- Location: Akersville–Rockbridge
- Length: 23.026 mi (37.057 km)

Kentucky Route 678 is a 23.026-mile-long (37.057 km) rural secondary highway in western and northern Monroe County. The L-shaped highway extends from KY 87 near Akersville north and east to KY 163 near Rockbridge. KY 678 begins at KY 87 (Akersville Road) north of Akersville and south of Fountain Run in southwestern Monroe County. The highway heads east along White Oak Ridge Road, which gradually curves north through intersections with KY 2509 (Deep Ford Road) and KY 100 (Fountain Run Road). KY 678 crosses Indian Creek and intersects KY 249 (Flippin Lamb Road) at Flippin. The highway continues along Stringtown Flippin Road, which follows Indian Creek to KY 2468 (Mud Lick Flippin Road) before veering north to cross Peter Creek west of Jeffrey. KY 678 crosses Boyd Creek and gradually curves northeast toward Mount Hermon, where the route has a very short concurrency with KY 63 (Old Glasgow Road). The highway continues east along Mount Hermon Road, which crosses Hackers Branch of Skaggs Creek and meets the northern end of KY 2452 (Sand Lick Road). KY 678 runs concurrently with KY 839 (Sulphur Lick Road) through Sulphur Lick. The highway's final segment is along Homer Bartley Road, which crosses Skaggs Creek before reaching the highway's terminus at KY 163 (Edmonton Road) south of Cyclone and north of Rockbridge.

=== Major intersections ===
The entire route is in Monroe County.

Location	mi	km	Destinations	Notes
	0.000	0.000	KY 87 (Akersville Road)	Western terminus
	3.646	5.868	KY 2509 south (Deep Ford Road)	Northern terminus of KY 2509
	4.722	7.599	KY 100 (Fountain Run Road)	
Flippin	5.382	8.661	KY 249 (Flippin Lamb Road)	
	6.376	10.261	KY 2468 east (Mud Lick Flippin Road)	Western terminus of KY 2468
Mount Hermon	13.897	22.365	KY 63 south (Old Glasgow Road)	West end of KY 63 overlap
Mount Hermon	13.917	22.397	KY 63 north (Old Glasgow Road)	East end of KY 63 overlap
	17.526	28.205	KY 2452 south (Sand Lick Road)	Northern terminus of KY 2452
	18.967	30.524	KY 839 north (Sulphur Lick Road)	West end of KY 839 overlap
	19.311	31.078	KY 839 south (Sulphur Lick Road)	East end of KY 839 overlap
	22.805	36.701	KY 163	Eastern terminus
1.000 mi = 1.609 km; 1.000 km = 0.621 mi: Concurrency terminus

== Kentucky Route 679 ==
Kentucky Route 679
- Location: Duckrun
- Length: 3.081 mi (4.958 km)

Kentucky Route 679 is a 3.081-mile-long (4.958 km) supplemental and rural secondary state highway in far eastern McCreary County and far western Whitley that runs from a point along New Liberty Road 0.5-mile (0.80 km) west of Bear Wallow School Road to Kentucky Route 478 at Duckrun.

== Kentucky Route 681 ==
Kentucky Route 681
- Location: near Cowan
- Length: 2.828 mi (4.551 km)

Kentucky Route 681 is a 2.828-mile-long (4.551 km) supplemental state highway in northwestern Fleming County that runs from Buchanan Road on the Nicholas County line to Kentucky Route 32 west of Cowan.

== Kentucky Route 682 ==
Kentucky Route 682
- Location: near Coburg-near Absher
- Length: 3.943 mi (6.346 km)

Kentucky Route 682 is a 3.943-mile-long (6.346 km) rural secondary state highway in northern Adair County that runs from Kentucky Route 55 southeast of Coburg to Kentucky Route 2971 northwest of Absher via Kellyville.

== Kentucky Route 683 ==
Kentucky Route 683
- Location: Stearns

Kentucky Route 683 was a state highway in McCreary County. It ran from KY 92 in Stearns to KY 1651 via Shirt Factory Road. The road was given to the county on December 21, 1993.

== Kentucky Route 684 ==
Kentucky Route 684
- Location: Stearns

Kentucky Route 684 was a state highway in McCreary County. It ran from KY 683 in Stearns to KY 1567 via Apple Tree Road. The road was given to the county on December 21, 1993.

== Kentucky Route 685 ==
Kentucky Route 685
- Location: Beckton–Cave City
- Length: 13.040 mi (20.986 km)

Kentucky Route 685 is a 13.040-mile-long (20.986 km) rural secondary highway in western Barren County. The highway begins at KY 1297 (Old Bowling Green Road) at Beckton. KY 685 heads north along Beckton Road, which crosses over the Cumberland Parkway just south of the highway's junction with US 68 and KY 80, which run concurrently along New Bowling Green Road. The route continues north along Stovall Road and intersects KY 2189 (Park City–Glasgow Road) just south of the route's grade crossing of the CSX-operated Glasgow Railway at Stovall. KY 685 meets the southern end of KY 2143 (Old Happy Valley Road) just west of the route's intersection with KY 90 (Happy Valley Road). The highway continues east and then north along Wilson Road to its end at KY 70 (Griderville Road) east of Cave City.

=== Major intersections ===
The entire route is in Barren County.

Location	mi	km	Destinations	Notes
Beckton	0.000	0.000	KY 1297 (Old Bowling Green Road)	Southern terminus
	2.401	3.864	US 68 / KY 80 (Bowling Green Road)	
	5.025	8.087	KY 2189 (Glasgow Road)	
	9.230	14.854	KY 2143 west	Eastern terminus of KY 2143
	9.367	15.075	KY 90 (Happy Valley Road)	
	13.040	20.986	KY 70 (Griderville Road) / Curd Road	Northern terminus; continues as Curd Road beyond KY 70
1.000 mi = 1.609 km; 1.000 km = 0.621 mi

== Kentucky Route 687 ==
Kentucky Route 687
- Location: near Langnau-Manchester
- Length: 15.406 mi (24.794 km)

Kentucky Route 687 is a 15.406-mile-long (24.794 km) rural secondary state highway in northeastern Laurel County and western Clay County that runs from Kentucky Route 472 southwest of Langnau to U.S. Route 421 and Kentucky Route 11 in downtown Manchester.

=== Major intersections ===
County	Location	mi	km	Destinations	Notes
Laurel		0.000	0.000	KY 472 (Johnson Road)	Western terminus
Clay	Gray Fork	9.831	15.821	KY 3476 north (Grayfork Road)	Southern terminus of KY 3476
Clay	Manchester	14.312	23.033	KY 2076 south (Muddy Gap Road)	Northern terminus of KY 2076
Clay	Manchester	15.406	24.794	US 421 / KY 11 (Richmond Road)	Eastern terminus
1.000 mi = 1.609 km; 1.000 km = 0.621 mi

== Kentucky Route 688 ==
Kentucky Route 688
- Location: Marion-Crayne
- Existed: May 14, 2002

Kentucky Route 688 was a 5.2-mile-long (8.4 km) rural secondary state highway in Crittenden County. It ran from US 641 and Kentucky Route 91 in Marion southwest via Chapel Hill Road to Reiters View Road, and turned east on Reiters View Road to US 641 and Kentucky Route 91 in Crayne. The highway was cancelled on May 14, 2002, and the road was given to Crittenden County.

== Kentucky Route 689 ==
Kentucky Route 689
- Location: Flatgap
- Length: 11.272 mi (18.141 km)

Kentucky Route 689 is a 11.272-mile-long (18.141 km) rural secondary state highway in northwestern Johnson County that runs from Kentucky Route 172 to Kentucky Route 1092 around and through Flatgap.

=== Major intersections ===
The entire route is in Johnson County.

Location	mi	km	Destinations	Notes
	0.000	0.000	KY 172	Southern terminus
	6.607	10.633	KY 172 east	South end of KY 172 overlap
	6.667	10.729	KY 172 west	North end of KY 172 overlap
Flatgap	7.829	12.600	KY 1092 east	South end of KY 1092 overlap
Flatgap	7.960	12.810	KY 1092 west	North end of KY 1092 overlap
	9.347	15.043	KY 1624 north	Southern terminus of KY 1624
	11.272	18.141	KY 1092	Northern terminus
1.000 mi = 1.609 km; 1.000 km = 0.621 mi: Concurrency terminus

== Kentucky Route 690 ==
Kentucky Route 690
- Location: Westview-Corners
- Length: 18.941 mi (30.483 km)

Kentucky Route 690 is a 18.941-mile-long (30.483 km) rural secondary state highway in eastern Breckinridge County that runs from Kentucky Routes 79 and 259 in southern Westview to Kentucky Route 333 and Rosetta-Corners Road at Corners via Se Ree, Fairfield, and Custer.

=== Major intersections ===
The entire route is in Breckinridge County.

Location	mi	km	Destinations	Notes
Westview	0.000	0.000	KY 79 / KY 259	Western terminus
	13.509	21.741	KY 1073 west (Locust Hill-Buras-Custer Road) / John Kennedy Road	Eastern terminus of KY 1073
Custer	14.425	23.215	KY 86	
Corners	18.941	30.483	KY 333 (Bewleyville-Big Spring Road) / Rosetta-Corners Road	Eastern terminus
1.000 mi = 1.609 km; 1.000 km = 0.621 mi

== Kentucky Route 691 ==
Kentucky Route 691
- Location: near Ellington-near Burkesville
- Length: 7.802 mi (12.556 km)

Kentucky Route 691 is a 7.802-mile-long (12.556 km) rural secondary state highway in central Cumberland County that runs from a dead end southwest of Ellington to Kentucky Route 90 west of Burkesville via Arat and Leslie.

=== Major intersections ===
The entire route is in Cumberland County.

Location	mi	km	Destinations	Notes
	0.000	0.000	Dead end	Western terminus
Arat	2.779	4.472	KY 1205 north (Arat Road)	Southern terminus of KY 1205
	7.802	12.556	KY 90 (Glasgow Road)	Eastern terminus
1.000 mi = 1.609 km; 1.000 km = 0.621 mi

== Kentucky Route 692 ==
Kentucky Route 692
- Location: near Somerset-near Shopville
- Length: 6.471 mi (10.414 km)

Kentucky Route 692 is a 6.471-mile-long (10.414 km) rural secondary state highway in east central Pulaski County that runs from Kentucky Route 192 east of Somerset to Kentucky Route 80 and Shopville Road southwest of Shopville via Grundy.

== Kentucky Route 694 ==
Kentucky Route 694
- Location: Grayson

Kentucky Route 694 was a state highway designated on October 27, 1993, running from KY 1/7 in Grayson northwest 5.790 miles (9.318 km). The road became part of rerouted KY 9 on October 13, 1994, as the remaining sections of the AA Highway were being constructed.

The original KY 694 was in Grayson County; it ran from KY 479 near Millerstown to KY 728 in Wheelers Mill via Wheeler Mill Road. The road was given to the county by 1977.

== Kentucky Route 696 ==
Kentucky Route 696
- Location: near Albany-near Windy

Kentucky Route 696 is a 6.471-mile-long (10.414 km) rural secondary state highway in southeastern Clinton County that runs from U.S. Route 127 Business southeast of Albany across Poplar Mountain to Kentucky Route 1009 northwest of Windy via Savage and Gapcreek.

=== Major intersections ===
County	Location	mi	km	Destinations	Notes
Clinton		0.000	0.000	US 127 Bus.	Southern terminus
Clinton		1.722	2.771	KY 1775 north	Southern terminus of KY 1775
Clinton		2.842	4.574	KY 1076 south	Northern terminus of KY 1076
Clinton		3.078	4.954	KY 415 south (Rolan Road)	South end of KY 415 overlap
Clinton		3.693	5.943	KY 415 north	North end of KY 415 overlap
Wayne	No major junctions				
Clinton	No major junctions				
Wayne		10.609	17.074	KY 1009	Northern terminus
1.000 mi = 1.609 km; 1.000 km = 0.621 mi: Concurrency terminus

== Kentucky Route 697 ==
Kentucky Route 697
- Location: near Tilton-near Flemingsburg
- Length: 7.910 mi (12.730 km)

Kentucky Route 697 is a 7.910-mile-long (12.730 km) rural secondary state highway in southwestern Fleming County that runs from Kentucky Route 1336 south of Tilton to Kentucky Route 32 southeast of Flemingsburg via Bald Hill.

=== Major intersections ===
The entire route is in Fleming County.

Location	mi	km	Destinations	Notes
	0.000	0.000	KY 1336 (Days Mill Road)	Southern terminus
	2.764	4.448	KY 2510 east (Bald Hill Road)	Western terminus of KY 2510
Bald Hill	4.993	8.035	KY 156 (Poplar Plains Road)	
	7.910	12.730	KY 32	Northern terminus
1.000 mi = 1.609 km; 1.000 km = 0.621 mi

== Kentucky Route 698 ==
Kentucky Route 698
- Location: near Mount Salem-near Stanford
- Length: 13.153 mi (21.168 km)

Kentucky Route 698 is a 13.153-mile-long (21.168 km) rural secondary state highway in eastern Casey County and southwestern Lincoln County that runs from Kentucky Route 198 southwest of Mount Salem to U.S. Route 27 south of Stanford via New Salem, Geneva, Jumbo, and Miracle.

=== History ===
KY 698 dates to 1962 or later.

The original KY 698 ran from US 31E/KY 61 south of Hodgenville to US 31E (now KY 470) in Magnolia. This became part of rerouted US 31E by 1962.

=== Major intersections ===
County	Location	mi	km	Destinations	Notes
Casey		0.000	0.000	KY 198 (Middleburg Road)	Western terminus
Lincoln		4.000	6.437	KY 1778 east	West end of KY 1778 overlap
Lincoln	Geneva	5.248	8.446	KY 1778 west (Geneva-McKinney Road)	East end of KY 1778 overlap
Lincoln		10.699	17.218	KY 3249 east	Western terminus of KY 3249
Lincoln		13.153	21.168	US 27 (Somerset Road)	Eastern terminus
1.000 mi = 1.609 km; 1.000 km = 0.621 mi
