= Kentucky Route 213 =

State highway in Kentucky, United States

Kentucky Route 213
- KY 213 highlighted in red

Route information
- Maintained by KYTC
- Length: 27.4 mi (44.1 km)

Major junctions
- South end: KY 52 near Ravenna
- Mountain Parkway / KY 11 / KY 15 in Stanton; KY 615 north of Stanton; KY 646 near Jeffersonville; US 460 in Jeffersonville
- North end: KY 713 near Jeffersonville

Location
- Country: United States
- State: Kentucky
- Counties: Estill, Powell, Montgomery

Highway system
- Kentucky State Highway System; Interstate; US; State; Parkways
← KY 212	→ KY 214

Kentucky Route 213 (KY 213) is a 27.4-mile-long (44.1 km) state highway in the U.S. state of Kentucky. The highway connects mostly rural areas of Estill, Powell, and Montgomery counties with Stanton and Jeffersonville.

== Route description ==
=== Estill County ===
KY 213 begins at an intersection with KY 52 (Tipton Road) east-northeast of Ravenna, in the Daniel Boone National Forest, within Estill County. It travels to the north-northeast and eventually travels along the Powell County line. It then curves to the east-northeast and intersects KY 1057 (Hardwicks Creek Road) on the northern edge of the forest. The two highways travel concurrently to the east-southeast and enter Estill County proper. They enter Furnace, where they split. KY 213 heads to the north-northeast and enters Powell County proper.

=== Powell County ===
At Knowlton Ridge Road, KY 213 curves to the southwest and leaves the national forest. It curves to the west-northwest and enters Knowlton. There, the highway curves to the north-northwest and enters Stanton. It intersects the western terminus of KY 3528 (Pendleton Street). Immediately afterward, it has an interchange with the Mountain Parkway. Immediately after that is an intersection with the southern terminus of KY 2483 (Stanton Road). Three blocks later, it meets KY 11/KY 15 (College Avenue). The road curves to the north-northeast and intersects the southern terminus of KY 2487 (Boone Street). At Court Street is the eastern terminus of KY 2476. One block later, the highway intersects the eastern terminus of KY 2026 (Maple Street). KY 213 curves back to the north-northwest and crosses over the Red River. It intersects KY 615 (North Bend Road). They begin a concurrency. Immediately, they cross over Boone Branch. Then, they split. Since KY 615 is a circular route, the two highways meet again in Morris. KY 213 curves to the northwest and enters Montgomery County.

=== Montgomery County ===
KY 213 curves back to the northeast and intersects the western terminus of KY 1314 (Calk Lake Road). It immediately crosses over Upper Spruce Creek. The highway continues winding its way to the north. It intersects the southern terminus of KY 646 (Willoughby Town Road). It enters Jeffersonville, where it has a brief concurrency with U.S. Route 460 (US 460; Main Street). KY 213 resumes its northeastern direction and passes the Jeffersonville Community Center. It crosses over Slate Creek and curves to the north-northeast before leaving Jeffersonville. The highway curves to the east-southeast and crosses over Pretty Run. Then, it curves back to the north-northeast and meets its northern terminus, an intersection with KY 713 (Spencer Road).

== Major intersections ==
County	Location	mi	km	Destinations	Notes
Estill	Daniel Boone National Forest	0.0	0.0	KY 52 (Tipton Road) – Ravenna, Beattyville	Southern terminus
Estill–Powell county line	Daniel Boone National Forest	5.5	8.9	KY 1057 west (Hardwicks Creek Road)	Southern end of KY 1057 concurrency
Estill	Furnace	5.9	9.5	KY 1057 east (Furnace–Cobhill Road)	Northern end of KY 1057 concurrency
Powell	Stanton	13.3	21.4	KY 3528 east (Pendleton Street)	Western terminus of KY 3528
Powell	Stanton	13.3	21.4	Mountain Parkway – Lexington, Campton	Mountain Parkway exit 22
Powell	Stanton	13.5	21.7	KY 2483 north (Stanton Road)	Southern terminus of KY 2483
Powell	Stanton	13.7	22.0	KY 11 / KY 15 (College Avenue)	
Powell	Stanton	13.9	22.4	KY 2487 north (Boone Street)	Southern terminus of KY 2487
Powell	Stanton	14.2	22.9	KY 2476 west (Court Street)	Eastern terminus of KY 2476
Powell	Stanton	14.2	22.9	KY 2026 west (Maple Street)	Eastern terminus of KY 2026
Powell		15.0	24.1	KY 615 east (North Bend Road)	Southern end of KY 615 concurrency
Powell		15.4	24.8	KY 615 west (Paint Creek Road)	Northern end of KY 615 concurrency
Powell	Morris	16.4	26.4	KY 615 east (Paint Creek Road)	Western terminus of KY 615
Montgomery		19.1	30.7	KY 1314 east (Calk Lake Road)	Western terminus of KY 1314
Montgomery		21.0	33.8	KY 646 north (Willoughby Town Road)	Southern terminus of KY 646
Montgomery	Jeffersonville	23.4	37.7	US 460 east (Main Street) – Frenchburg	Southern end of US 460 concurrency
Montgomery	Jeffersonville	23.6	38.0	US 460 west (Main Street) – Mount Sterling	Northern end of US 460 concurrency
Montgomery		27.4	44.1	KY 713 (Spencer Road) – Mount Sterling, Hope	Northern terminus
1.000 mi = 1.609 km; 1.000 km = 0.621 mi
