= Kentucky Route 686 =

State highway in Kentucky, United States

Kentucky Route 686
- KY 686 highlighted in red

Route information
- Maintained by KYTC
- Length: 6.333 mi (10.192 km)

Major junctions
- West end: US 460 / KY 11 in Mount Sterling
- US 60 in Mount Sterling; US 460 in Mount Sterling
- East end: US 60 in Mount Sterling

Location
- Country: United States
- State: Kentucky
- Counties: Montgomery

Highway system
- Kentucky State Highway System; Interstate; US; State; Parkways
← KY 685	→ KY 687

Kentucky Route 686 (KY 686) is a 6.333-mile (10.192 km) state highway around the city of Mount Sterling, Kentucky. The route begins at Kentucky Route 11 and U.S. Route 460 north of the city and goes counter-clockwise, ending at U.S. Route 60 east of downtown. The western portion of the bypass from KY 11 south of the city to US 460 north of the city was completed in late 1985 as a four-lane highway. East of the southern junction with US 460 to the eastern terminus at US 60, KY 686 is a 2.827-mile (4.550 km) two-lane highway on a four-lane right-of-way and was completed in the early 2000s.

== Route description ==
KY 686 begins at an intersection with US 460/KY 11 in the northern part of Mount Sterling, heading west on four-lane divided Indian Mound Drive. The road passes through business areas, curving to the south. The route intersects KY 713 before coming to a junction with US 60. Past US 60, KY 686 heads through residential areas with some businesses, turning to the east. The road intersects KY 11 again and passes more development in the southern part of Mount Sterling before coming to another junction with US 460. Following this intersection, the route heads northeast into agricultural areas and narrows into a two-lane undivided road, crossing KY 713 again. KY 686 curves to the north and passes through more rural areas before heading near residential and commercial development and ending at another intersection with US 60 to the east of Mount Sterling.

== History ==
KY 686 was formed ca. 1968.

The original KY 686 ran from US 231/KY 79 in Morgantown to KY 263 in Woodbury; this became part of KY 403 when it was extended south.

== Major intersections ==
The entire route is in Montgomery County.

Location	mi	km	Destinations	Notes
Mount Sterling	0.000	0.000	US 460 / KY 11 (North Maysville Street) to I-64	
	1.364	2.195	KY 713 (West High Street)	
Mount Sterling	1.656	2.665	US 60 (West Main Street) – Mount Sterling, Winchester	
Mount Sterling	2.750	4.426	KY 11 (Levee Road) – Levee, Clay City	
Mount Sterling	3.506	5.642	US 460 – Camargo, Jeffersonville, Frenchburg	
	4.850	7.805	KY 713	
			Old Owingsville Road	former KY 687
	6.333	10.192	US 60 to I-64	
1.000 mi = 1.609 km; 1.000 km = 0.621 mi
