= Ticktown =

Ticktown may refer to:

- Ticktown, a former name of Jeffersonville, Kentucky
- Ticktown, Virginia, an unincorporated community
