= Robert E. Lee Blackburn =

American politician

Robert Blackburn

Member of the U.S. House of Representatives from Kentucky's 7th district
- In office March 4, 1929 – March 3, 1931
- Preceded by: Virgil Chapman
- Succeeded by: Virgil Chapman

Member of the Kentucky House of Representatives from the 73rd district
- In office January 1, 1904 – January 1, 1906
- Preceded by: Charles W. Russell
- Succeeded by: Albert Hamilton

Personal details
- Born: April 9, 1870 Near Furnace, Kentucky, U.S.
- Died: September 20, 1935 (aged 65) Lexington, Kentucky, U.S.
- Resting place: Stanton Cemetery, Stanton, Kentucky, U.S.
- Party: Republican

Robert E. Lee Blackburn (April 9, 1870 – September 20, 1935) was a member of the United States House of Representatives representing Kentucky's 7th congressional district.

Born on a farm near Furnace, Kentucky, Blackburn as an infant moved with his parents to Stanton, Kentucky. He attended the county schools, and Elliott Academy at Kirksville, Kentucky. He worked as a traveling salesman for an oil company from 1891 to 1900 and during the Spanish–American War he served as a second lieutenant in Company C, Fourth Infantry, United States Volunteers. Blackburn engaged in general merchandising at Stanton, Kentucky, and in agricultural pursuits 1900–1907, served as member of the Kentucky House of Representatives in 1904 and 1905, and served as clerk of the court of Powell County, Kentucky from 1906 to 1910. Blackburn was engaged in the insurance and stock brokerage business from 1910 through 1919.

Blackburn moved to Lexington, Kentucky in 1919 and continued in the insurance and brokerage business. He was also engaged in the oil development business. Blackburn was appointed a member of the Kentucky Board of Agriculture in 1926 and served until 1928.

Blackburn was elected as a Republican to the Seventy-first Congress (March 4, 1929 – March 3, 1931). He was an unsuccessful candidate for reelection in 1930 to the Seventy-second Congress and for election in 1932 to the Seventy-third Congress. He resumed his former activities in the oil business and resided in Lexington, Kentucky until his death there on September 20, 1935. He was interred in Stanton Cemetery, Stanton, Kentucky.

U.S. House of Representatives
Preceded by Virgil Chapman	Member of the U.S. House of Representatives from Kentucky's 7th congressional district March 4, 1929-March 3, 1931	Succeeded by Virgil Chapman
