= Piqua =

Piqua may refer to:

- Pekowi, a band of the Shawnee Native American tribe and the origin of the word "Piqua"
- Piqua, Kansas
- Piqua, Kentucky
- Piqua, Ohio
- Piqua (YTB-793)
