= National Register of Historic Places listings in Robertson County, Kentucky =

Location of Robertson County in Kentucky

This is a list of the National Register of Historic Places listings in Robertson County, Kentucky.

It is intended to be a complete list of the properties on the National Register of Historic Places in Robertson County, Kentucky, United States. The locations of National Register properties for which the latitude and longitude coordinates are included below, may be seen in a map.

There are 3 properties listed on the National Register in the county.

This National Park Service list is complete through NPS recent listings posted December 12, 2025.

== Current listings ==
| | Name on the Register | Image | Date listed | Location | City or town | Description |
|---|---|---|---|---|---|---|
| 1 | Johnson Creek Covered Bridge | Johnson Creek Covered Bridge | September 27, 1976 (#76000941) | Covered Bridge Rd., off Kentucky Route 1029 (Old Blue Lick Rd.); 38°28′55″N 83°58′42″W | Mount Olivet vic. | |
| 2 | Thomas Metcalfe House | Thomas Metcalfe House | January 8, 1987 (#87000187) | Cedar Creek Rd. & Willie Curtis Rd. 38°29′49″N 84°05′38″W | Mount Olivet vic. | |
| 3 | Robertson County Courthouse | Robertson County Courthouse | February 14, 1978 (#78001394) | Court St. 38°31′54″N 84°02′09″W | Mount Olivet | Italianate courthouse completed in 1870 |

== See also ==
- List of National Historic Landmarks in Kentucky
- National Register of Historic Places listings in Kentucky
