= Kentontown, Kentucky =

Unincorporated community in Kentucky, United States

Kentontown
- Unincorporated community
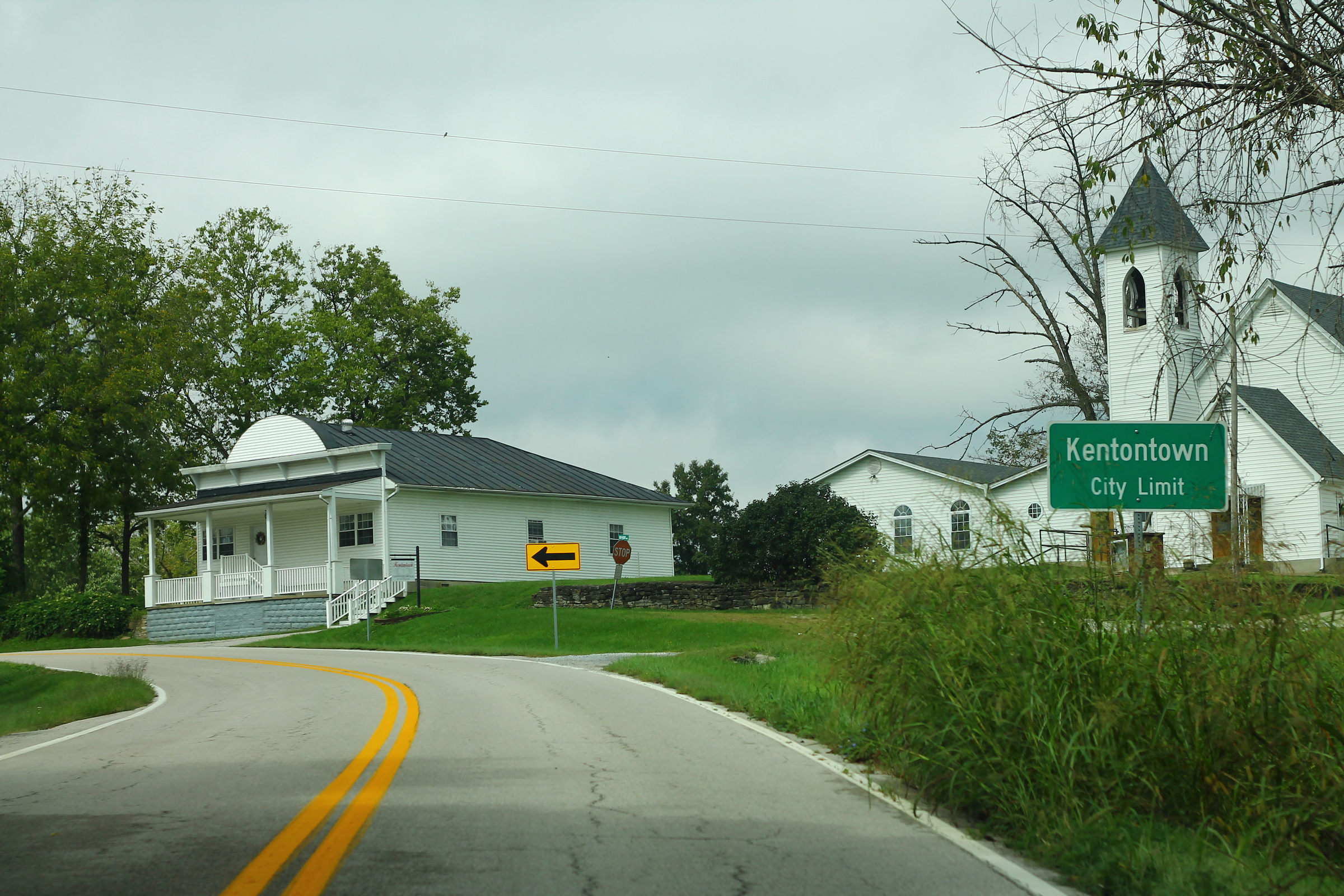

- Location within the state of Kentucky Kentontown (the United States)
- Coordinates: 38°29′34″N 84°7′10″W
- Country: United States
- State: Kentucky
- County: Robertson
- Elevation: 725 ft (221 m)
- Time zone: UTC-5 (Eastern (EST))
  - Summer (DST): UTC-4 (EDT)
- GNIS feature ID: 495664

Kentontown is an unincorporated community in Robertson County, Kentucky, United States. It lies along U.S. Route 62 and Kentucky Route 617 southwest of the city of Mount Olivet, the county seat of Robertson County. Its elevation is 725 feet (221 m).

== History ==
Kentontown was settled before Robertson County was formed.
