= Kentucky Route 472 =

State highway in Kentucky, United States

Kentucky Route 472
- KY 472 highlighted in red

Route information
- Maintained by KYTC
- Length: 19.808 mi (31.878 km)

Major junctions
- West end: KY 80 in London
- Hal Rogers Parkway in London
- East end: US 421 near Burning Springs

Location
- Country: United States
- State: Kentucky
- Counties: Laurel, Clay

Highway system
- Kentucky State Highway System; Interstate; US; State; Parkways
← KY 471	→ KY 473

Kentucky Route 472 (KY 472) is a 19.808-mile-long (31.878 km) state highway in Kentucky that runs from Kentucky Route 80 in eastern London to U.S. Route 421 south of Burning Springs.

== Major intersections ==
County	Location	mi	km	Destinations	Notes
Laurel	London	0.000	0.000	KY 80 (Manchester Road)	Western terminus
Laurel	London	0.444	0.715	Hal Rogers Parkway – Hazard, London	At-grade intersection
Laurel	London	0.469	0.755	Frontage Road (KY 6263 north)	Southern terminus of KY 6263
Laurel		2.478	3.988	KY 586 north (Old Salem Road)	Southern terminus of KY 586
Laurel		7.178	11.552	KY 687 east (Pistol Creek Road)	Western terminus of KY 687
Laurel		7.626	12.273	KY 3435 north (Langnau Road)	Southern terminus of KY 3435
Laurel		9.920	15.965	KY 638 west (McWhorter Road)	West end of KY 638
Laurel		10.063	16.195	KY 638 east	East end of KY 638 overlap
Clay		14.059	22.626	KY 638 west	West end of KY 638 overlap
Clay		14.451	23.257	KY 638 east	East end of KY 638 overlap
Clay		19.808	31.878	US 421	Eastern terminus
1.000 mi = 1.609 km; 1.000 km = 0.621 mi: Concurrency terminus
