= Mount Eden, Kentucky =

Unincorporated community in Kentucky, United States

- Unincorporated community
- Location within Kentucky Location within the United States
- Coordinates: 38°03′22″N 85°09′04″W
- Country: United States
- State: Kentucky
- County: Spencer
- Elevation: 846 ft (258 m)
- Time zone: UTC-5 (Eastern (EST))
  - Summer (DST): UTC-4 (EDT)
- ZIP code: 40046
- Area code: 502
- GNIS feature ID: 498717

Mount Eden is an unincorporated community in Spencer County, Kentucky, United States. The community is located along Kentucky Route 636 10.6 miles (17.1 km) east of Taylorsville.
