= Oak Forest, Kentucky =

Unincorporated community in Kentucky, United States

Oak Forest
- Unincorporated community
- Location within the state of Kentucky Oak Forest (the United States)
- Coordinates: 36°42′57″N 86°05′54″W
- Country: United States
- State: Kentucky
- County: Allen
- Elevation: 804 ft (245 m)
- Time zone: UTC−6 (CST)
  - Summer (DST): UTC−5 (CDT)
- ZIP codes: 42164
- GNIS feature ID: 508727

Oak Forest is a rural unincorporated community in southeastern Allen County, Kentucky, United States. The settlement is on Kentucky Route 671 and Kentucky Route 100.
