= Kentucky Route 713 =

State highway in Kentucky, United States

Kentucky Route 713
- KY 713 highlighted in red

Route information
- Maintained by KYTC
- Length: 32.986 mi (53.086 km)

Major junctions
- West end: US 460 near Grassy Lick
- KY 686 in Mount Sterling; US 60 in Mount Sterling; US 460 / KY 11 in Mount Sterling; KY 686 near Mount Sterling; US 460 near Means
- East end: US 460 in Frenchburg

Location
- Country: United States
- State: Kentucky
- Counties: Montgomery, Menifee

Highway system
- Kentucky State Highway System; Interstate; US; State; Parkways
← KY 712	→ KY 714

Kentucky Route 713 (KY 713) is a 32.986-mile-long (53.086 km) state highway in Montgomery County and western Menifee County, Kentucky, that runs from U.S. Route 460 (US 460) north of Grassy Lick to US 460 again in western Frenchburg via Grassy Lick, Mount Sterling, Spencer, Walkers Crossing, Means, Coburn, and Fagan.

== Major intersections ==
County	Location	mi	km	Destinations	Notes
Montgomery		0.000	0.000	US 460 (Paris Road)	Western terminus
Montgomery	Mount Sterling	5.786	9.312	KY 686 (Indian Mound Drive)	
Montgomery	Mount Sterling	6.385	10.276	US 60 west (West Main Street)	West end of US 60 overlap
Montgomery	Mount Sterling	6.616	10.647	US 460 east / KY 11 north (South Bank Street) / North Bank Street	West end of US 460 / KY 11 overlap
Montgomery	Mount Sterling	6.687	10.762	US 460 west / KY 11 north (North Maysville Street) to I-64 / South Maysville Street	East end of US 460 / KY 11 overlap
Montgomery	Mount Sterling	6.855	11.032	US 60 east (East Main Street) / North Queen Street	East end of US 60 overlap
Montgomery		8.280	13.325	KY 686 (Indian Mound Drive)	
Montgomery		9.875	15.892	KY 646 south (Whitaker Lane)	Northern terminus of KY 646
Montgomery	Antioch Church	14.208	22.866	KY 213 south (Bedford Road)	Northern terminus of KY 213
Montgomery	Hope	17.551	28.246	KY 965 north (Stulltown Road)	Southern terminus of KY 965
Menifee		21.428	34.485	KY 3340 north (East Fork Road)	Southern terminus of KY 3340
Menifee		22.416	36.075	US 460 east	West end of US 460 overlap
Menifee	Means	22.933	36.907	US 460 west	East end of US 460 overlap
Menifee	Frenchburg	32.986	53.086	US 460 (Main Street)	Eastern terminus
1.000 mi = 1.609 km; 1.000 km = 0.621 mi: Concurrency terminus
