= Coburg, Kentucky =

Unincorporated community in Kentucky, United States

Coburg
- Unincorporated community
- Location within the state of Kentucky Coburg (the United States)
- Coordinates: 37°12′5″N 85°20′9″W
- Country: United States
- State: Kentucky
- County: Adair
- Elevation: 741 ft (226 m)
- Time zone: UTC-6 (Central (CST))
  - Summer (DST): UTC-5 (CDT)
- GNIS feature ID: 507722

Coburg is an unincorporated community in Adair County, Kentucky, United States. Its elevation is 741 feet (226 m).

== Geography ==
Coburg is on Kentucky Route 55 at the eastern terminus of Kentucky Route 1913. It is also on Kentucky Route 633. A bridge on Route 55 crosses the Green River in the community.
