= Montpelier, Kentucky =

Unincorporated community in Kentucky, United States

Montpelier
- Unincorporated community
- Location within the state of Kentucky Montpelier (the United States)
- Coordinates: 37°1′8″N 85°11′8″W
- Country: United States
- State: Kentucky
- County: Adair
- Elevation: 876 ft (267 m)
- Time zone: UTC-6 (Central (CST))
  - Summer (DST): UTC-5 (CDT)
- GNIS feature ID: 508630

Montpelier is an unincorporated community in Adair County, Kentucky, United States. Its elevation is 876 feet (267 m).

== History ==
The community was named for the city in France.

Grand Army of the Republic post 115, Conover Darnell, was located in Montpelier.

== Geography ==
It is on Kentucky Route 92 and Kentucky Route 55 near a dead end on Lake Cumberland south of Jamestown. It is also southeast of Kentucky Route 619.
