= Manitou, Kentucky =

Census-designated place in Kentucky, United States

- Census-designated place
- Location within Kentucky Location within the United States
- Coordinates: 37°22′32″N 87°34′41″W
- Country: United States
- State: Kentucky
- County: Hopkins

Area
  - Total: 0.66 sq mi (1.72 km^{2})
  - Land: 0.66 sq mi (1.71 km^{2})
  - Water: 0.0039 sq mi (0.01 km^{2})
- Elevation: 407 ft (124 m)

Population (2020)
  - Total: 173
  - Density: 262.4/sq mi (101.32/km^{2})
- Time zone: UTC-6 (Central (CST))
  - Summer (DST): UTC-5 (CST)
- ZIP code: 42436
- FIPS code: 21-49746
- GNIS feature ID: 2629646

Manitou (/ˈmænɪtuː/) is an unincorporated community and census-designated place (CDP) in Hopkins County, Kentucky, United States. As of the 2020 census, Manitou had a population of 173. It is a small community that lies a few miles northwest of Madisonville on US 41, at its intersection with KY 630 and KY 262.

== Demographics ==
Historical population
Census	Pop.	Note	%±
2020	173		—
U.S. Decennial Census
