= Maynard, Kentucky =

Unincorporated community in Kentucky, United States

Maynard
- Unincorporated community
- Location within the state of Kentucky Maynard (the United States)
- Coordinates: 36°46′09″N 86°04′33″W
- Country: United States
- State: Kentucky
- County: Allen
- Elevation: 791 ft (241 m)
- Time zone: UTC−6 (CST)
  - Summer (DST): UTC−5 (CDT)
- ZIP codes: 42164
- GNIS feature ID: 508570

Maynard is a rural unincorporated community in eastern Allen County, Kentucky, United States. The settlement is on Kentucky Route 671 and Kentucky Route 98.
