= Absher, Kentucky =

Unincorporated community in Kentucky, United States

Absher
- Unincorporated community
- Location within the state of Kentucky Absher (the United States)
- Coordinates: 37°10′7″N 85°15′33″W
- Country: United States
- State: Kentucky
- County: Adair
- Elevation: 906 ft (276 m)
- Time zone: UTC-6 (Central (CST))
  - Summer (DST): UTC-5 (CDT)
- GNIS feature ID: 507369

Absher is an unincorporated community in Adair County, Kentucky, United States. Its elevation is 906 feet (276 m). It is located on Kentucky Route 682 at the northern terminus of Kentucky Route 2971, as well as Kentucky Route 551 and 1323.

Absher had a Grand Army of the Republic post named for Sam McKee, even though he was not positively identified.
