= Piqua, Kentucky =

Unincorporated community in Kentucky, United States

Piqua
- Unincorporated community
- Location within the state of Kentucky Piqua (the United States)
- Coordinates: 38°27′58″N 84°2′43″W
- Country: United States
- State: Kentucky
- County: Robertson
- Elevation: 705 ft (215 m)
- Time zone: UTC-5 (Eastern (EST))
  - Summer (DST): UTC-4 (EDT)
- GNIS feature ID: 508828

Piqua (pronounced locally as "PICK-way") is an unincorporated village in Robertson County, Kentucky, United States. It lies along Routes 165 and 617 south of the city of Mount Olivet, the county seat of Robertson County. Its name refers to the Pekowi or Piqua band of the Shawnee Indians which were Indigenous to the region which became Kentucky. Its elevation is 705 feet (215 m). Johnson Creek, a tributary of the Licking River, flows through the community.
