= Kentucky Route 98 =

State highway in Kentucky, United States

Kentucky Route 98
- KY 98 highlighted in red

Route information
- Maintained by KYTC
- Length: 13.910 mi (22.386 km)

Major junctions
- West end: KY 100 in Scottsville
- East end: KY 100 near Fountain Run

Location
- Country: United States
- State: Kentucky
- Counties: Allen, Monroe

Highway system
- Kentucky State Highway System; Interstate; US; State; Parkways
← KY 97	→ KY 99

Kentucky Route 98 (KY 98) is a 13.910-mile-long (22.386 km) state highway in Kentucky that runs from Kentucky Route 100 in Scottsville to Kentucky Route 100 southwest of Fountain Run.

== Route description ==
KY 98 begins in downtown Scottsville intersecting KY 100. It intersects KY 1855 at Maynard and then traverses the southernmost part of Barren River Lake before intersecting KY 921. It ends approximately 0.4 miles (0.64 km) into Monroe County at another intersection with KY 100 just west of Fountain Run.

== History ==
KY 98 was designated in 1930, running from KY 123 near Columbus to US 68 in Aurora. This became part of KY 80 between 1950 and 1955, and the current KY 98 was designated.

== Major intersections ==
County	Location	mi	km	Destinations	Notes
Allen	Scottsville	0.000	0.000	KY 100 (East Main Street / South Fifth Street)	Western terminus
Allen	Scottsville	0.320	0.515	KY 3499 north (Old Glasgow Road)	Southern terminus of KY 3499
Allen		6.346	10.213	KY 1855 north (Walnut Creek Road)	Southern terminus of KY 1855
Allen		8.820	14.194	KY 671 south (Pitchford Ridge Road)	Northern terminus of KY 671
Allen		9.189	14.788	KY 921 north (Beowleytown Road)	Southern terminus of KY 921
Monroe		13.526	21.768	KY 2170 east (Mill Street)	Western terminus of KY 2170
Monroe		13.845	22.281	KY 100 (Fountain Run Road)	Eastern terminus
1.000 mi = 1.609 km; 1.000 km = 0.621 mi
