= Broughtentown, Kentucky =

Unincorporated community in Kentucky, United States

- Unincorporated community
- Location within Kentucky Location within the United States
- Coordinates: 37°23′2″N 84°32′36″W
- Country: United States
- State: Kentucky
- County: Lincoln
- Elevation: 1,289 ft (393 m)
- Time zone: UTC-5 (Eastern (EST))
  - Summer (DST): UTC-4 (EDT)
- ZIP code: 40489
- Area code: 606
- GNIS feature ID: 487976

Broughtentown (also spelled Broughtontown) is an unincorporated community in Lincoln County, Kentucky, United States. The community is in the southeast corner of the county at the intersection of State Routes 618 and 1781.

Broughtentown had its own elementary school until 1994, when the county school board closed the building after its septic tank system failed. While the initial closure was described as temporary, the board voted to permanently close the school the following year. The community also has a fire station, which has doubled as a polling place for the local election precinct.
