= Ibex, Kentucky =

Unincorporated community in Kentucky, United States

- Unincorporated community
- Location within the state of Kentucky Ibex (the United States)
- Coordinates: 38°10′34″N 83°4′25″W
- Country: United States
- State: Kentucky
- County: Elliott
- Elevation: 804 ft (245 m)
- Time zone: UTC-5 (Eastern (EST))
  - Summer (DST): UTC-4 (EDT)
- GNIS feature ID: 508305

Ibex is an unincorporated community within Elliott County, Kentucky, United States.

A post office was established in the community in 1890. Ibex was named from the animal of the same name by its first postmaster.
