= Neosheo, Kentucky =

Unincorporated community in Kentucky, United States

Neosheo
- Unincorporated community
- Location within the state of Kentucky Neosheo (the United States)
- Coordinates: 36°42′43″N 86°40′43″W
- Country: United States
- State: Kentucky
- County: Simpson
- Elevation: 614 ft (187 m)
- Time zone: UTC-5 (Eastern (EST))
  - Summer (DST): UTC-4 (EDT)
- GNIS feature ID: 499264

Neosheo is an unincorporated community within Simpson County, Kentucky, United States, located at the intersection of Sulphur Springs Road (Ky Hwy 664) and the Neosheo-Prices Mill Road (Ky Hwy 1885) approximately four (4) miles west of the town of Franklin, KY—the county seat of Simpson County. The old Neosheo Store, which was torn down in the 1970s, was located on the southwest corner of the intersection, just across the road from the Sulphur Springs Baptist Church and approximately one-half mile west of the old West Simpson Elementary School building (now privately owned). Neosheo was also historically known as the Georgia Settlement.
