= Westview, Kentucky =

Unincorporated community in Kentucky, United States

- Unincorporated community
- Location within Kentucky Location within the United States
- Coordinates: 37°42′00″N 86°24′33″W
- Country: United States
- State: Kentucky
- County: Breckinridge
- Elevation: 741 ft (226 m)
- Time zone: UTC-6 (Central (CST))
  - Summer (DST): UTC-5 (CDT)
- ZIP code: 40178
- Area code: 270
- GNIS feature ID: 506504

Westview is an unincorporated community in Breckinridge County, Kentucky, United States. Westview is located along Kentucky Route 79, 6.2 miles (10.0 km) south-southeast of Hardinsburg. Westview had a post office until it closed on August 2, 2008.
