= Robertson County, Kentucky =

County in Kentucky, United States

- County
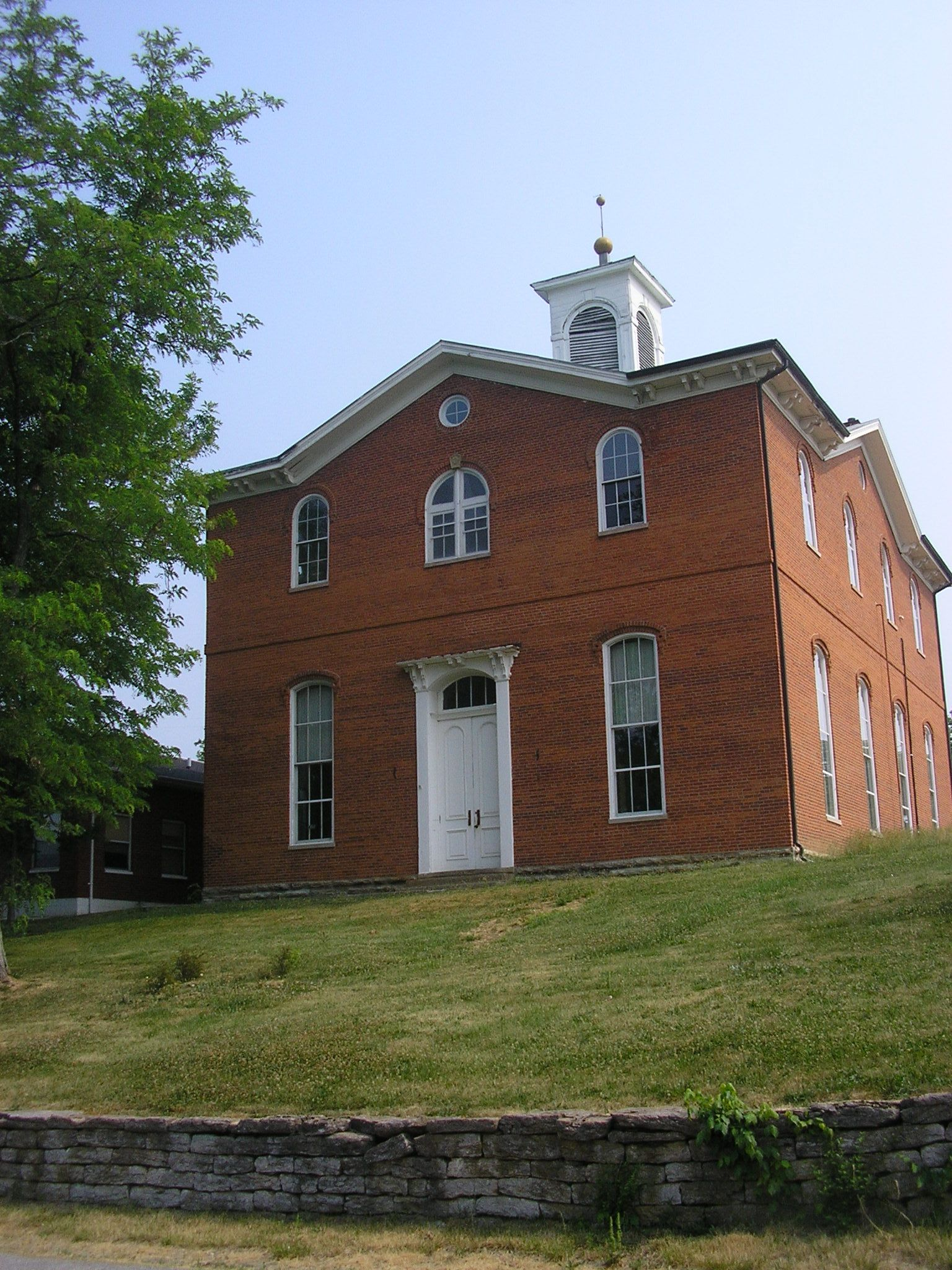
- Robertson County Courthouse in Mount Olivet

- Location within the U.S. state of Kentucky
- Coordinates: 38°31′N 84°03′W
- Country: United States
- State: Kentucky
- Founded: 1867
- Named for: George Robertson
- Seat: Mount Olivet
- Largest city: Mount Olivet

Government
  - Judge/Executive: Valerie Grigson Miley (R)

Area
  - Total: 100 sq mi (260 km^{2})
  - Land: 100 sq mi (260 km^{2})
  - Water: 0.2 sq mi (0.52 km^{2}) 0.2%

Population (2020)
  - Total: 2,193
  - Estimate (2025): 2,325 ▲
  - Density: 22/sq mi (8.5/km^{2})
- Time zone: UTC−5 (Eastern)
  - Summer (DST): UTC−4 (EDT)
- Congressional district: 6th
- Website: robertsoncounty.ky.gov

Robertson County is a county located in the U.S. Commonwealth of Kentucky. As of the 2020 census, the population was 2,193. Its county seat is Mount Olivet. The county is named for George Robertson, a Kentucky Congressman from 1817 to 1821. It is Kentucky's smallest county by both total area and by population.

== History ==
Robertson County was formed on February 11, 1867, from portions of Bracken County, Harrison County, Mason County and Nicholas County. It was named after George Robertson, a judge and member of Congress.

== Politics ==
United States presidential election results for Robertson County, Kentucky
Year	Republican		Democratic		Third party(ies)	
Year	No.	%	No.	%	No.	%
1912	158	15.94%	570	57.52%	263	26.54%
1916	415	38.32%	663	61.22%	5	0.46%
1920	623	39.68%	940	59.87%	7	0.45%
1924	498	41.85%	680	57.14%	12	1.01%
1928	742	53.69%	640	46.31%	0	0.00%
1932	538	33.54%	1,056	65.84%	10	0.62%
1936	498	35.50%	897	63.93%	8	0.57%
1940	578	40.88%	829	58.63%	7	0.50%
1944	556	39.35%	855	60.51%	2	0.14%
1948	442	33.43%	864	65.36%	16	1.21%
1952	623	42.94%	827	57.00%	1	0.07%
1956	617	43.70%	793	56.16%	2	0.14%
1960	594	47.67%	652	52.33%	0	0.00%
1964	383	34.23%	734	65.59%	2	0.18%
1968	416	41.15%	406	40.16%	189	18.69%
1972	456	51.01%	421	47.09%	17	1.90%
1976	275	33.21%	546	65.94%	7	0.85%
1980	416	41.64%	562	56.26%	21	2.10%
1984	567	54.36%	467	44.77%	9	0.86%
1988	511	49.37%	515	49.76%	9	0.87%
1992	329	34.81%	439	46.46%	177	18.73%
1996	368	43.29%	360	42.35%	122	14.35%
2000	630	63.13%	341	34.17%	27	2.71%
2004	670	61.47%	413	37.89%	7	0.64%
2008	533	52.51%	451	44.43%	31	3.05%
2012	579	61.93%	340	36.36%	16	1.71%
2016	759	74.93%	222	21.92%	32	3.16%
2020	884	77.14%	253	22.08%	9	0.79%
2024	915	79.98%	215	18.79%	14	1.22%

=== Elected officials ===
Elected officials as of January 3, 2025
U.S. House	Thomas Massie (R)	KY 4
Ky. Senate	Stephen West (R)	27
Ky. House	William Lawrence (R)	70

== Geography ==
According to the U.S. Census Bureau, the county has a total area of 100 square miles (260 km^{2}), of which 100 square miles (260 km^{2}) is land and 0.2 square miles (0.52 km^{2}) (0.2%) is water. It is the smallest county by area in Kentucky.

=== Adjacent counties ===
- Bracken County (north)
- Mason County (northeast)
- Fleming County (southeast)
- Nicholas County (south)
- Harrison County (west)

== Demographics ==
Historical population
Census	Pop.	Note	%±
1870	5,399		—
1880	5,814		7.7%
1890	4,684		−19.4%
1900	4,900		4.6%
1910	4,121		−15.9%
1920	3,871		−6.1%
1930	3,344		−13.6%
1940	3,419		2.2%
1950	2,881		−15.7%
1960	2,443		−15.2%
1970	2,163		−11.5%
1980	2,265		4.7%
1990	2,124		−6.2%
2000	2,266		6.7%
2010	2,282		0.7%
2020	2,193		−3.9%
2025 (est.)	2,325	▲	6.0%
U.S. Decennial Census; 1790-1960 1900-1990; 1990-2000 2010-2020

=== 2020 census ===
As of the 2020 census, the county had a population of 2,193. The median age was 48.3 years. 21.2% of residents were under the age of 18 and 22.3% of residents were 65 years of age or older. For every 100 females there were 97.2 males, and for every 100 females age 18 and over there were 96.0 males age 18 and over.

The racial makeup of the county was 96.3% White, 0.3% Black or African American, 0.1% American Indian and Alaska Native, 0.3% Asian, 0.0% Native Hawaiian and Pacific Islander, 0.1% from some other race, and 2.8% from two or more races. Hispanic or Latino residents of any race comprised 0.9% of the population.

0.0% of residents lived in urban areas, while 100.0% lived in rural areas.

There were 882 households in the county, of which 29.6% had children under the age of 18 living with them and 23.9% had a female householder with no spouse or partner present. About 29.9% of all households were made up of individuals and 15.9% had someone living alone who was 65 years of age or older.

There were 1,038 housing units, of which 15.0% were vacant. Among occupied housing units, 77.6% were owner-occupied and 22.4% were renter-occupied. The homeowner vacancy rate was 2.1% and the rental vacancy rate was 5.7%.

=== 2000 census ===
At the 2000 census there were 2,266 people, 866 households, and 621 families in the county, making it the least populated county in the state. The population density was 23 per square mile (8.9/km^{2}). There were 1,034 housing units at an average density of 10 per square mile (3.9/km^{2}). The racial makeup of the county was 98.63% White, 0.04% Black or African American, 0.04% Native American, 0.22% from other races, and 1.06% from two or more races. 0.93% of the population were Hispanic or Latino of any race. Of the 866 households 31.10% had children under the age of 18 living with them, 57.60% were married couples living together, 9.10% had a female householder with no husband present, and 28.20% were non-families. 24.70% of households were one person and 11.10% were one person aged 65 or older. The average household size was 2.54 and the average family size was 3.00.

The age distribution was 23.80% under the age of 18, 6.70% from 18 to 24, 27.10% from 25 to 44, 25.50% from 45 to 64, and 16.90% 65 or older. The median age was 40 years. For every 100 females there were 94.80 males. For every 100 females age 18 and over, there were 92.50 males.

The median household income was $30,581 and the median family income was $35,521. Males had a median income of $27,656 versus $20,476 for females. The per capita income for the county was $13,404. About 17.50% of families and 22.20% of the population were below the poverty line, including 30.30% of those under age 18 and 24.10% of those age 65 or over.

== Communities ==
=== Cities ===
- Mount Olivet (county seat)
- Sardis (mostly in Mason County)

=== Unincorporated communities ===
- Kentontown
- Piqua

== See also ==
- National Register of Historic Places listings in Robertson County, Kentucky
