= Tribune, Kentucky =

Unincorporated community in Kentucky, United States

Tribune
- Unincorporated community
- Location within the state of Kentucky Tribune (the United States)
- Coordinates: 37°20′52″N 87°59′31″W
- Country: United States
- State: Kentucky
- County: Crittenden
- Elevation: 433 ft (132 m)
- Time zone: UTC-5 (Eastern (EST))
  - Summer (DST): UTC-4 (EDT)
- GNIS feature ID: 509233

Tribune is an unincorporated community within Crittenden County, Kentucky, United States. It was also known as Hills Chapel.
