= Jeffersonville, Kentucky =

- City
- Location in Montgomery County, Kentucky

- Location within Kentucky Location within the United States
- Coordinates: 37°58′9″N 83°49′28″W
- Country: United States
- State: Kentucky
- County: Montgomery
- Incorporated: March 20, 1876
- Named for: Pres. Thomas Jefferson

Government
  - Type: City Commission
  - Mayor of Jeffersonville: Steve Barnes (Non-Partisan)

Area
  - Total: 2.75 sq mi (7.13 km^{2})
  - Land: 2.74 sq mi (7.10 km^{2})
  - Water: 0.012 sq mi (0.03 km^{2})
- Elevation: 817 ft (249 m)

Population (2020)
  - Total: 1,708
  - Estimate (2022): 1,729
  - Density: 622.7/sq mi (240.41/km^{2})
- Time zone: UTC-5 (Eastern (EST))
  - Summer (DST): UTC-4 (EDT)
- ZIP code: 40337
- Area code: 859
- FIPS code: 21-40240
- GNIS feature ID: 0512986

Jeffersonville is a home rule-class city in Montgomery County, Kentucky, in the United States. The population was 1,708 as of the 2020 census, up from 1,506 in 2010. It is part of the Mount Sterling micropolitan area.

== History ==
Jeffersonville began as an important cattle-trading center in Eastern Kentucky during the mid-19th century. It was then known as "Ticktown", either for the tickgrass (Eragrostis echinochloidea) in the area or for the ticks in the cattle pens. Although it is unknown when the settlement became known as Jeffersonville, the first post office was established under that name on March 9, 1866. It presumably honors President Thomas Jefferson.

Jeffersonville was incorporated on March 20, 1876.

== Geography ==
Jeffersonville is located in southeastern Montgomery County at 37°58′9″N 83°49′28″W (37.969148, -83.824466). U.S. Route 460 follows the city's Main Street and leads northwest 8 miles (13 km) to Mount Sterling, the county seat, and east 13 miles (21 km) to Frenchburg. Kentucky Route 213 leads south from Jeffersonville 9 miles (14 km) to Stanton and north 4 miles (6 km) to its terminus at Kentucky Route 713.

According to the United States Census Bureau, Jeffersonville has a total area of 2.75 square miles (7.12 km^{2}), of which 0.01 square miles (0.03 km^{2}), or 0.40%, are water. The city is drained to the north by tributaries of Slate Creek, which continues north to the Licking River, a tributary of the Ohio River.

== Demographics ==
Historical population
Census	Pop.	Note	%±
1880	60		—
1900	84		—
1910	86		2.4%
1920	53		−38.4%
1930	84		58.5%
1970	775		—
1980	1,528		97.2%
1990	1,854		21.3%
2000	1,804		−2.7%
2010	1,506		−16.5%
2020	1,708		13.4%
2022 (est.)	1,729		1.2%
U.S. Decennial Census

=== 2020 census ===
As of the 2020 census, Jeffersonville had a population of 1,708. The median age was 41.9 years. 22.5% of residents were under the age of 18 and 17.5% of residents were 65 years of age or older. For every 100 females there were 99.3 males, and for every 100 females age 18 and over there were 99.1 males age 18 and over.

0.0% of residents lived in urban areas, while 100.0% lived in rural areas.

There were 662 households in Jeffersonville, of which 34.0% had children under the age of 18 living in them. Of all households, 50.5% were married-couple households, 15.7% were households with a male householder and no spouse or partner present, and 25.2% were households with a female householder and no spouse or partner present. About 22.0% of all households were made up of individuals and 11.3% had someone living alone who was 65 years of age or older.

There were 727 housing units, of which 8.9% were vacant. The homeowner vacancy rate was 2.0% and the rental vacancy rate was 8.7%.

Racial composition as of the 2020 census
Race	Number	Percent
White	1,635	95.7%
Black or African American	5	0.3%
American Indian and Alaska Native	0	0.0%
Asian	8	0.5%
Native Hawaiian and Other Pacific Islander	0	0.0%
Some other race	9	0.5%
Two or more races	51	3.0%
Hispanic or Latino (of any race)	11	0.6%

=== 2000 census ===
As of the census of 2000, there were 1,804 people, 682 households, and 525 families residing in the city. The population density was 596.6 inhabitants per square mile (230.3/km^{2}). There were 738 housing units at an average density of 244.0 per square mile (94.2/km^{2}). The racial makeup of the city was 99.06% White, 0.11% African American, 0.11% Native American, 0.17% Asian, and 0.55% from two or more races. Hispanic or Latino of any race were 0.94% of the population.

There were 682 households, out of which 38.4% had children under the age of 18 living with them, 61.6% were married couples living together, 12.3% had a female householder with no husband present, and 22.9% were non-families. 19.6% of all households were made up of individuals, and 8.8% had someone living alone who was 65 years of age or older. The average household size was 2.65 and the average family size was 3.02.

In the city, the population was spread out, with 26.6% under the age of 18, 8.6% from 18 to 24, 31.4% from 25 to 44, 22.4% from 45 to 64, and 11.0% who were 65 years of age or older. The median age was 34 years. For every 100 females, there were 101.3 males. For every 100 females age 18 and over, there were 96.1 males.

The median income for a household in the city was $29,392, and the median income for a family was $33,355. Males had a median income of $26,492 versus $17,576 for females. The per capita income for the city was $13,254. About 14.7% of families and 18.5% of the population were below the poverty line, including 22.7% of those under age 18 and 19.7% of those age 65 or over.

== Education ==
=== Public schools ===
Most students residing within Jeffersonville attend the following schools, which are located in nearby Mount Sterling:

- Early Learning Center
- Camargo Elementary School
- Mapleton Elementary School
- Mount Sterling Elementary School
- J.B. McNabb Middle School
- Montgomery County High School

=== Private schools ===
- Jeffersonville Christian Academy
- Grace Christian Academy
- Christian Traditional School
