= Custer, Kentucky =

Unincorporated community in Kentucky, United States

- Unincorporated community
- Location within the state of Kentucky Custer (the United States)
- Coordinates: 37°44′18″N 86°15′17″W
- Country: United States
- State: Kentucky
- County: Breckinridge
- Elevation: 820 ft (250 m)
- Time zone: UTC-6 (Central (CST))
  - Summer (DST): UTC-5 (CDT)
- ZIP codes: 40115
- GNIS feature ID: 490511

Custer is an unincorporated community within Breckinridge County, Kentucky, United States.

A post office was established for the community in 1876. The name had been intended to be Crossroads, but when the post office application was sent on the day of the defeat of George Armstrong Custer at Little Bighorn, the town was then named in Custer's honor.

The community has a school, store, and a Masonic lodge.
