= Chapman, Lawrence County, Kentucky =

Unincorporated community in Kentucky, United States

Coordinates: 38°01′25″N 82°37′26″W

Chapman is an unincorporated community located in Lawrence County, Kentucky, United States on the eastern bank of the Levisa Fork River. It is served by KY Route 2037. A high volume railway line, operated by CSX Transportation, extends through its limits and continues in a southerly direction throughout southeastern Kentucky to western Virginia and points south.

Although its location is many miles from the nearest industrial employer, the railroad has served the community as a source of employment. The railroad was first built through the community in 1880 by CSX's predecessor, the Chesapeake and Ohio Railway. C&O employees who resided in Chapman caught the train as it passed through on its multiple daily runs where they reported to work. Chapman, Kentucky is named after its first settler and prominent landowner David Chapman (1803–1845), a native of Montgomery, West Virginia. Many of Chapman's descendants still reside in the community at this time. Chapmansville, West Virginia, a city located on U.S. Route 119 about forty miles east of Chapman, was established in 1800 by David Chapman's uncle Ned Chapman, as he was its first postmaster and general store operator. The Chapman surname is an anglicized version of the German name Kaufmann, the German word for merchant. David Chapman's ancestors originally emigrated to North America from Kaufmann, Germany. Chapman is located 10 miles (16 km) south of Louisa, Kentucky.
