= Rockland, Kentucky =

Unincorporated community in Kentucky, United States

Coordinates: 37°05′23″N 86°35′02″W

Rockland is an unincorporated community in Warren County, in the U.S. state of Kentucky.

== History ==
A post office called Rockland was established in 1875, and remained in operation until 1916. The community was named for a rock outcropping near the original town site.
