= Dog Walk, Kentucky =

Unincorporated community in Kentucky, United States

- Unincorporated community
- Location in Kentucky Location in the United States
- Coordinates: 37°22′37″N 84°30′8″W
- Country: United States
- State: Kentucky
- County: Lincoln
- Elevation: 1,280 ft (390 m)
- Time zone: UTC-5 (Eastern (EST))
  - Summer (DST): UTC-4 (EDT)
- GNIS feature ID: 490984

Dog Walk is an unincorporated community located in Lincoln County, Kentucky, United States.

The origin of the community's name is disputed. One local story is that it came from a remark that the local young men "just walked the roads like a pack of dogs". Don Brown, who organized the local Dog Walk Days festival in 1991, speculated that the name had Native American origins.
