= Ticktown, Virginia =

Unincorporated community in Virginia, United States

Coordinates: 37°43′12″N 75°41′33″W

Ticktown is an unincorporated community in Accomack County, Virginia, United States.
