= Turkey Creek, Kentucky =

Unincorporated community in Kentucky, United States

Turkey Creek
- Unincorporated community
- Location within the state of Kentucky Turkey Creek (the United States)
- Coordinates: 37°40′15″N 82°18′26″W
- Country: United States
- State: Kentucky
- County: Pike
- Elevation: 656 ft (200 m)
- Time zone: UTC-5 (Eastern (EST))
  - Summer (DST): UTC-4 (EDT)
- ZIP codes: 41570
- GNIS feature ID: 505585

Turkey Creek is an unincorporated community in Pike County, Kentucky, United States. Their post office closed in November 1996.
