= Schochoh, Kentucky =

Unincorporated community in Kentucky, United States

- Unincorporated community
- Location within Kentucky Location within the United States
- Coordinates: 36°43′22″N 86°47′28″W
- Country: United States
- State: Kentucky
- County: Logan
- Elevation: 636 ft (194 m)
- Time zone: UTC-6 (Central (CST))
  - Summer (DST): UTC-5 (CDT)
- GNIS feature ID: 503046

Schochoh is an unincorporated community in Logan County, Kentucky, United States.

== History ==
The community, which is named for a location in Judea, was used as a camp meeting site during the Second Great Awakening before its first permanent buildings were built in the 1850s. It grew from its religious origins into a small farming community noted for its corn. The community holds an annual Christmas parade, which began in 1990.
