= Sassafras Ridge, Kentucky =

Unincorporated community in Kentucky, United States

- Unincorporated community
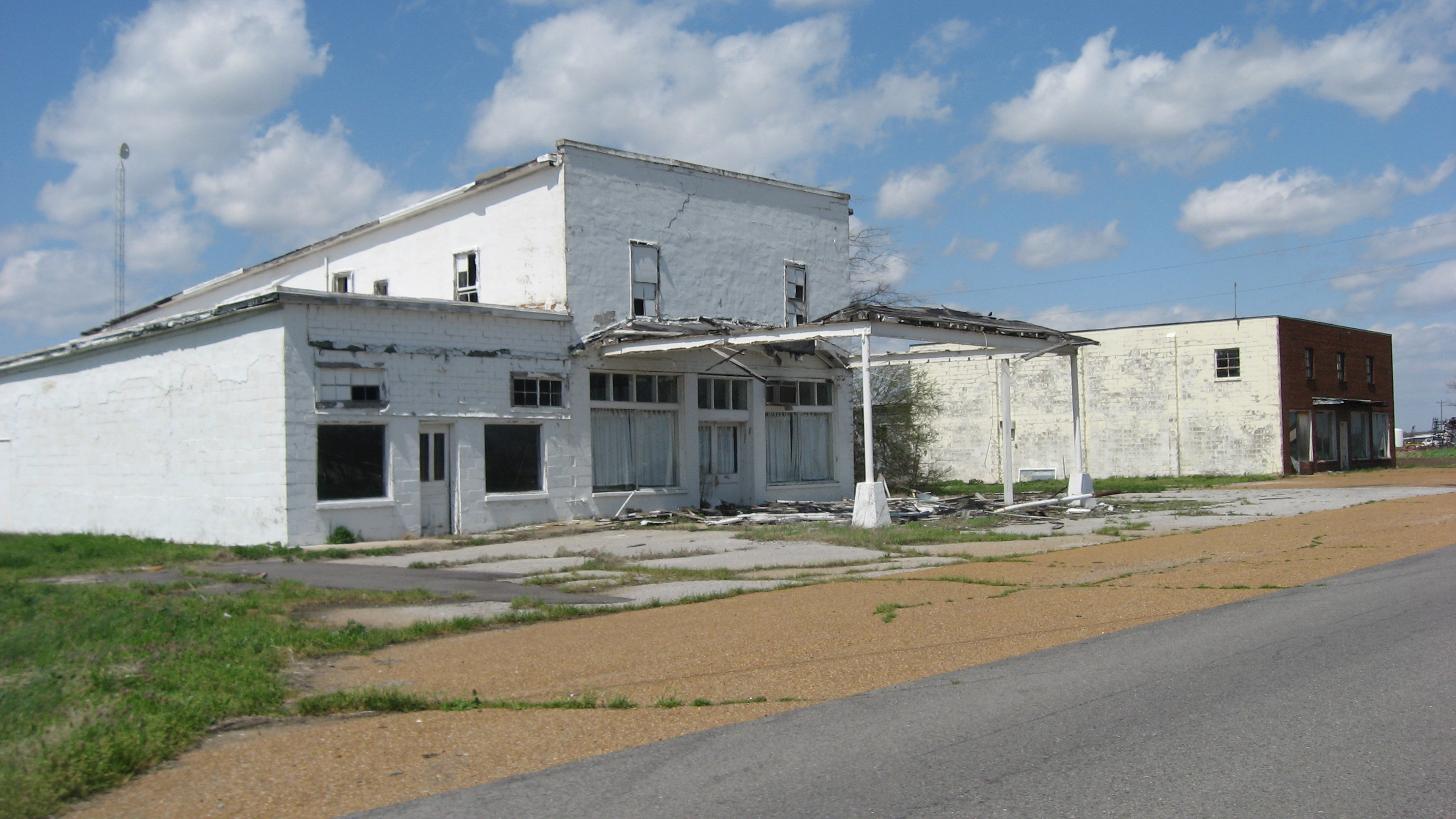
- Abandoned buildings in Sassafras Ridge

- Location within the state of Kentucky Sassafras Ridge (the United States)
- Coordinates: 36°33′7″N 89°19′45″W
- Country: United States
- State: Kentucky
- County: Fulton
- Elevation: 299 ft (91 m)
- Time zone: UTC-6 (Central (CST))
  - Summer (DST): UTC-5 (CST)
- GNIS feature ID: 502999

Sassafras Ridge is a former unincorporated community in Fulton County, Kentucky, United States.
