= Barterville, Kentucky =

Human settlement in United States of America

Coordinates: 38°22′44″N 84°04′08″W

Barterville is an unincorporated community in Nicholas County, in the U.S. state of Kentucky.

== History ==
A post office was established at Barterville in 1879, and remained in operation until 1973. The name most likely refers to deals made in the community through the exchange of goods.
