= Hope, Kentucky =

Unincorporated community in Kentucky, United States

- Unincorporated community
- Location within Kentucky Location within the United States
- Coordinates: 38°00′57″N 83°46′23″W
- Country: United States
- State: Kentucky
- County: Montgomery
- Elevation: 801 ft (244 m)
- Time zone: UTC-5 (Eastern (EST))
  - Summer (DST): UTC-4 (EDT)
- ZIP codes: 40334
- GNIS feature ID: 508277

Hope is an unincorporated community within Montgomery County, Kentucky, United States.

A post office was established in 1890. According to one source, the town may have been given the name Hope by its first postmaster when, after unsuccessfully submitting several names to the post office, he finally submitted Hope in the 'hope' this time it would be accepted.
