= Furnace, Kentucky =

Unincorporated community in Kentucky, United States

- Unincorporated community
- Location within the state of Kentucky Furnace (the United States)
- Coordinates: 37°45′43″N 83°49′54″W
- Country: United States
- State: Kentucky
- County: Estill
- Elevation: 1,257 ft (383 m)
- Time zone: UTC-5 (Eastern (EST))
  - Summer (DST): UTC-4 (EDT)
- GNIS feature ID: 512266

Furnace is an unincorporated community located in Estill County, Kentucky, United States.

== History ==
Settlers found the surrounding area rich in iron ore. The Estill Steam Furnace, a blast furnace was established in about 1830.

A post office was established in the community in 1857, and named for the Estill Steam Furnace. This was shortened to Furnace in 1882. The post office was discontinued in 1975.
