= Stanton, Kentucky =

- City
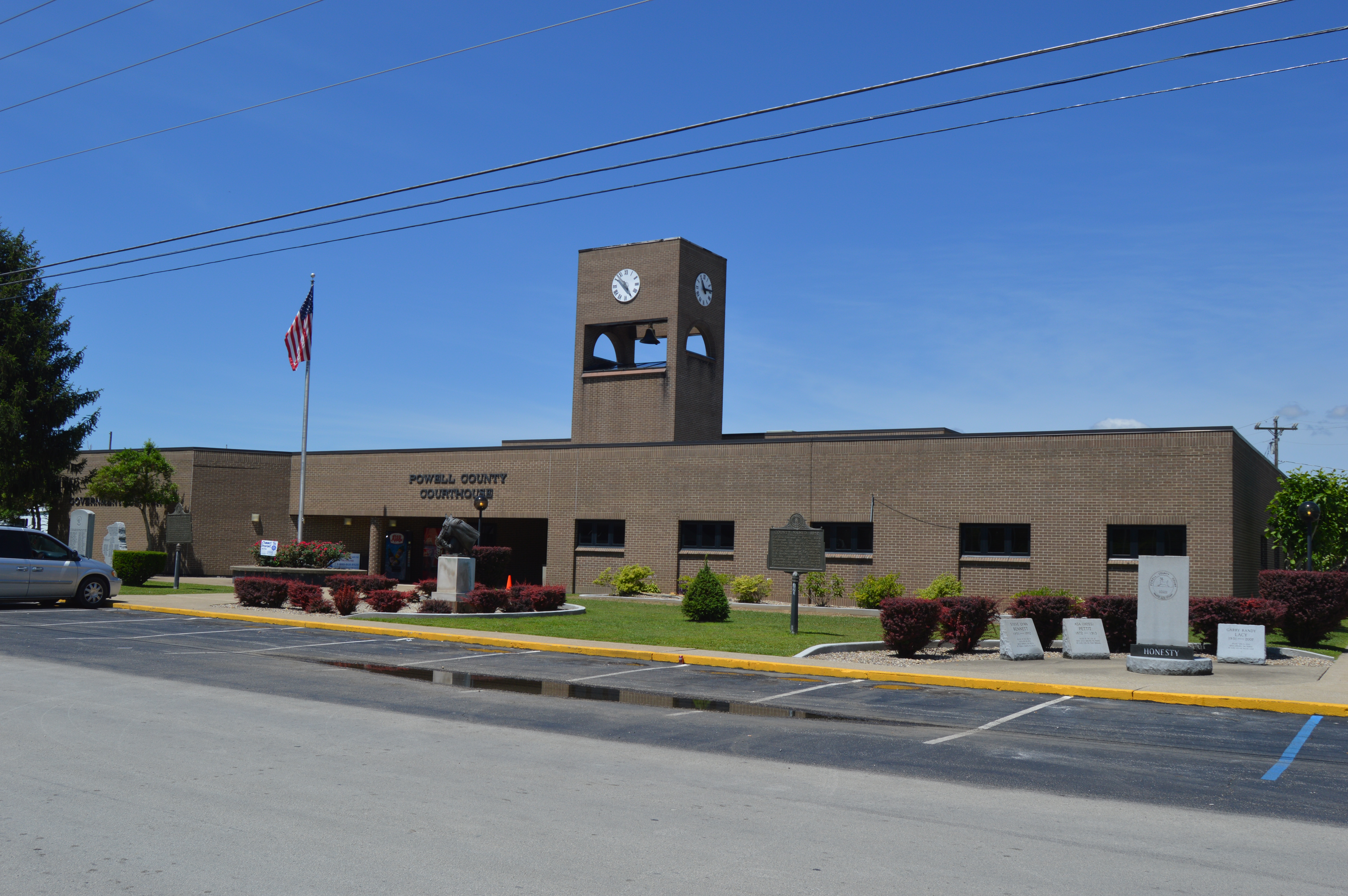
- Powell County Courthouse in Stanton
- Nickname: Nature's Bridge to the Mountains
- Location of Stanton in Powell County, Kentucky.
- Coordinates: 37°50′51″N 83°51′33″W
- Country: United States
- State: Kentucky
- County: Powell
- Incorporated: March 9, 1854

Government
  - Type: Mayor-Council
  - Mayor: Willie Means

Area
  - Total: 2.28 sq mi (5.91 km^{2})
  - Land: 2.28 sq mi (5.90 km^{2})
  - Water: 0.0039 sq mi (0.01 km^{2})
- Elevation: 673 ft (205 m)

Population (2020)
  - Total: 3,251
  - Estimate (2024): 3,171
  - Density: 1,428.3/sq mi (551.47/km^{2})
- Time zone: UTC-5 (Eastern (EST))
  - Summer (DST): UTC-4 (EDT)
- ZIP code: 40380
- Area code: 606
- FIPS code: 21-73164
- GNIS feature ID: 0515661
- Website: www.stantonky.gov

Stanton is a home rule-class city in and the county seat of Powell County, Kentucky, United States. The population was 3,251 in the 2020 census.

Stanton is the birthplace of Hall of Fame thoroughbred horse trainer Woody Stephens.

== History ==
The first post office to be located in present-day Stanton was established on July 7, 1849, and was named Beaver Pond, because of the settlement's proximity to a small body of water resulting from a beaver dam. In 1852, both the post office and the settlement were renamed Stanton for Richard H. Stanton, who served in Congress from 1849 to 1855 and later as a U.S. senator.

In the late 1800s and early 1900s, Stanton (and nearby Clay City) were booming logging centers for Eastern Kentucky. The city was also connected to much of the country by a railroad that went through the city and county. Since then the railroad has been removed. The original train depot still exists and is home to the Powell County Tourism Association.

== Geography ==
Stanton is located at 37°50′51″N 83°51′33″W (37.847610, -83.859250). Stanton lies in the floodplain of the Red River.

According to the United States Census Bureau, the city has a total area of 2.0 square miles (5.2 km^{2}), all land.

== Education ==
Public education in Stanton is administered by Powell County School District. The district operates Bowen Elementary School, Stanton Elementary School, Powell County Middle School, Powell County High School, and Powell County Alternative School.

Stanton has a lending library, the Powell County Public Library.

== Government ==
Stanton is governed by a Mayor–council form of government. The current mayor is Willie Means.

The representative body of the city of Stanton is the city council. The council members include: Jenell Brewer, Dixie Lockard, Mark Merriman, Rhonda Roe, Tara Gilbert-Wells, and Tommy Mays.

The Stanton Police Department (SPD) is a 24-hour department. The current Chief of Police is Grant Faulkner. SPD is a fully functioning police department that is involved in multiple facets of the community and other law enforcement agencies in the area including Clay City Police Department, Powell County Sheriffs Office, Kentucky State Police, surrounding county agencies, and federal agencies.

== Events ==
During the first weekend in August, Stanton conducts the annual Corn Festival. The Corn Festival has been a tradition in Stanton since the first festival on August 5–6, 1989. The festival has events such as corn eating contests, talent shows, beauty competitions, car shows, and corn hole tournaments. The festival also includes booths with local artisans exhibiting and selling art. The festival draws around 5,000 people annually.

Another event that happens near Stanton is the Powell County Fair in the second week in September. It is held at the local Lion's Club Park (Powell County Fairgrounds). The fair includes many booths of people advertising their businesses and political groups. It also includes a few rides and many events including truck/tractor pulls, greased pig competition and baby pageants.

== Demographics ==
Historical population
Census	Pop.	Note	%±
1860	59		—
1870	73		23.7%
1880	98		34.2%
1900	192		—
1910	278		44.8%
1920	311		11.9%
1930	423		36.0%
1940	625		47.8%
1950	635		1.6%
1960	753		18.6%
1970	2,037		170.5%
1980	2,691		32.1%
1990	2,795		3.9%
2000	3,029		8.4%
2010	2,733		−9.8%
2020	3,251		19.0%
2024 (est.)	3,171		−2.5%
U.S. Decennial Census

=== 2020 census ===
As of the 2020 census, Stanton had a population of 3,251. The median age was 38.4 years. 22.7% of residents were under the age of 18 and 16.6% of residents were 65 years of age or older. For every 100 females there were 103.8 males, and for every 100 females age 18 and over there were 101.0 males age 18 and over.

0.0% of residents lived in urban areas, while 100.0% lived in rural areas.

There were 1,210 households in Stanton, of which 34.5% had children under the age of 18 living in them. Of all households, 36.3% were married-couple households, 18.6% were households with a male householder and no spouse or partner present, and 34.2% were households with a female householder and no spouse or partner present. About 31.9% of all households were made up of individuals and 15.4% had someone living alone who was 65 years of age or older.

There were 1,326 housing units, of which 8.7% were vacant. The homeowner vacancy rate was 1.0% and the rental vacancy rate was 7.3%.

Racial composition as of the 2020 census
Race	Number	Percent
White	3,081	94.8%
Black or African American	26	0.8%
American Indian and Alaska Native	5	0.2%
Asian	17	0.5%
Native Hawaiian and Other Pacific Islander	0	0.0%
Some other race	39	1.2%
Two or more races	83	2.6%
Hispanic or Latino (of any race)	66	2.0%

=== 2010 census ===
As of the census of 2010, there were 2,733 people, 1,048 households, and 667 families residing in the city. The population density was 1,365.5 inhabitants per square mile (527.2/km^{2}). There were 1,048 housing units at an average density of 524 per square mile (202/km^{2}). The racial makeup of the city was 92.5% White, 2.4% African American, 0.4% Native American, 0.6% Asian, 0.03% from other races, and 0.4% from two or more races. Hispanic or Latino of any race were 3.1% of the population.

There were 1,048 households, out of which 27.0% had children under the age of 18 living with them, 32.0% were married couples living together, 13.4% had a female householder with no husband present, and 8.9% were non-families. 26.6% of all households were made up of individuals, and 11.0% had someone living alone who was 65 years of age or older. The average household size was 2.60 and the average family size was 3.04.

In the city, the population was spread out, with 27.0% under the age of 18, 8.6% from 18 to 24, 23.3% from 25 to 44, 31.2% from 45 to 64, and 11.6% who were 65 years of age or older. The median age was 39 years. For every 100 females, there were 91.1 males. For every 100 females age 18 and over, there were 86.0 males.

The median income for a household in the city was $25,750, and the median income for a family was $29,781. Males had a median income of $25,081 versus $20,432 for females. The per capita income for the city was $13,521. About 19.5% of families and 31.9% of the population were below the poverty line, including 29.2% of those under age 18 and 21.4% of those age 65 or over.
