= Mount Olivet, Kentucky =

- City
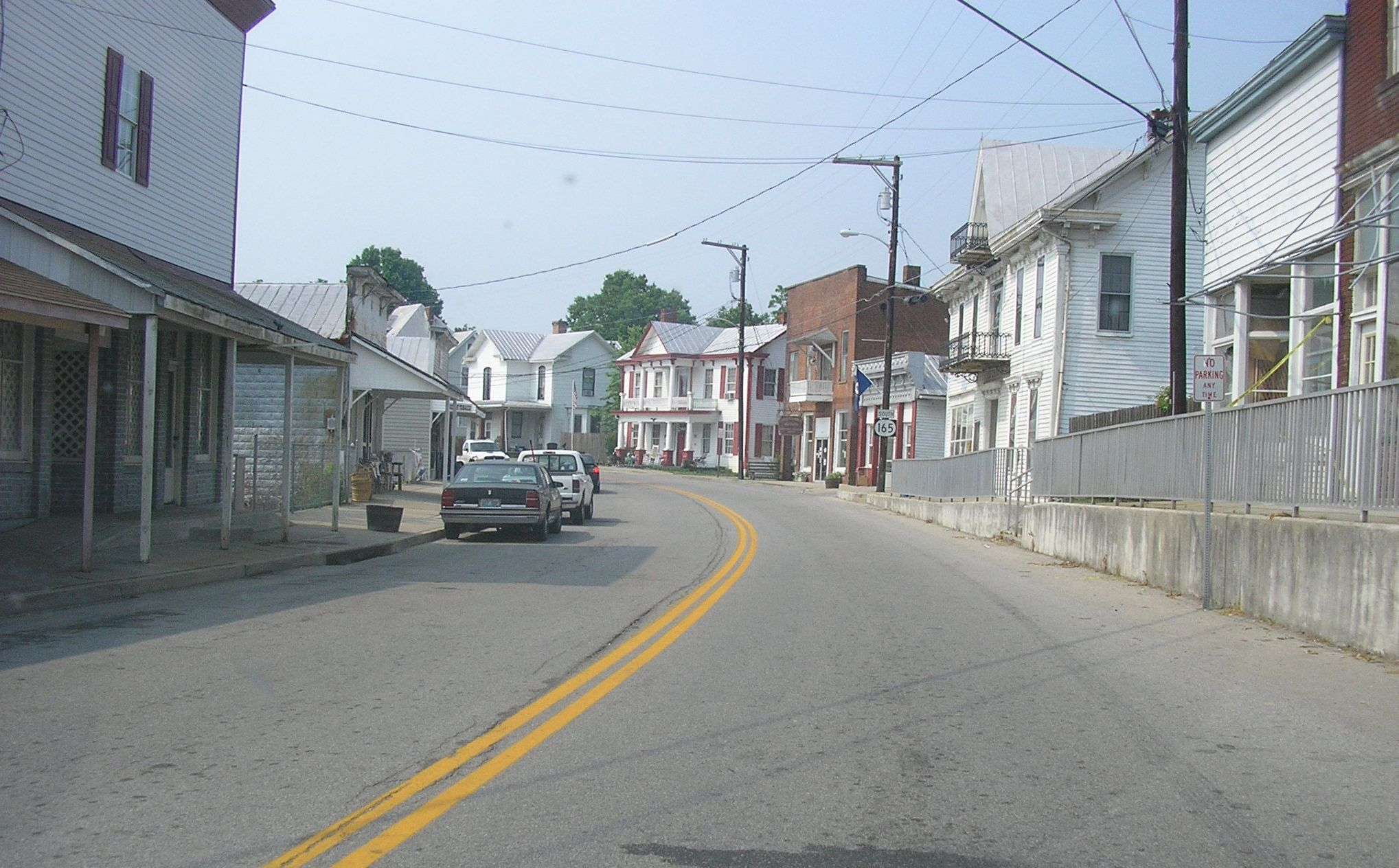
- Downtown Mount Olivet

- Location of Mount Olivet in Robertson County, Kentucky.
- Coordinates: 38°31′54″N 84°02′09″W
- Country: United States
- State: Kentucky
- County: Robertson
- Incorporated: December 27, 1851
- Reincorporated: March 18, 1871
- Named for: the Mount of Olives

Government
  - Mayor: Jenny Whalen
  - Vice-Mayor: Stanley Henderson
  - City Council: Brandon Burden; Marchetta Eubanks; Stephanie Holbrook; Brooklynn McFarland; Kenny Whalen

Area
  - Total: 0.83 sq mi (2.14 km^{2})
  - Land: 0.83 sq mi (2.14 km^{2})
  - Water: 0 sq mi (0.00 km^{2})
- Elevation: 965 ft (294 m)

Population (2020)
  - Total: 347
  - Density: 419.8/sq mi (162.08/km^{2})
- Time zone: UTC-5 (Eastern (EST))
  - Summer (DST): UTC-4 (EDT)
- ZIP code: 41064
- Area code: 606
- FIPS code: 21-53976
- GNIS feature ID: 2404322

Mount Olivet is a home rule-class city in and the county seat of Robertson County, Kentucky, United States, located at the junction of U.S. Route 62 and Kentucky Route 165. The population was 347 at the 2020 United States census.

== History ==
Long before the town of Mount Olivet was created, the Battle of Blue Licks was fought in 1783 between Patriot American frontiersmen and pro-British Loyalist-Native American allies. The decisive result of the battle was a major American defeat at the end of the American Revolutionary War.

Mount Olivet was founded in 1820, and incorporated on December 27, 1851. It became the county seat of Robertson County when the county was formed in 1867. The town was subsequently dissolved, then reincorporated on March 18, 1871, by an act of the Kentucky General Assembly. Mount Olivet was classified as a fifth-class city until 2015, when it was reclassified as a home rule–class city.

The 1871 act of incorporation established the town's boundary as a perfect circle centered on the intersection of Main and Walnut streets with a radius of 120 poles (1,980 ft; 604 m). However, in 1981, the city clarified that the circle has a radius of 2,620 feet (800 m). In 2014, the city annexed 26.38 acres (10.68 ha) of unincorporated territory, consisting of the new Robertson County School and the rights of way of U.S. Route 62 and Kentucky Route 616 leading to the school.

== Geography ==
According to the United States Census Bureau, the city has a total area of 0.4 square miles (1.0 km^{2}), all of it land.

== Demographics ==
Historical population
Census	Pop.	Note	%±
1870	254		—
1880	317		24.8%
1890	327		3.2%
1900	352		7.6%
1910	321		−8.8%
1920	340		5.9%
1930	419		23.2%
1940	573		36.8%
1950	455		−20.6%
1960	386		−15.2%
1970	442		14.5%
1980	346		−21.7%
1990	384		11.0%
2000	289		−24.7%
2010	299		3.5%
2020	347		16.1%
U.S. Decennial Census

As of the census of 2000, there were 289 people, 130 households, and 73 families residing in the city. The population density was 751.8 inhabitants per square mile (290.3/km^{2}). There were 145 housing units at an average density of 377.2 per square mile (145.6/km^{2}). The racial makeup of the city was 97.92% White, 1.38% from other races, and 0.69% from two or more races. Hispanic or Latino of any race were 1.38% of the population.

There were 130 households, out of which 28.5% had children under the age of 18 living with them, 33.1% were married couples living together, 16.2% had a female householder with no husband present, and 43.8% were non-families. 38.5% of all households were made up of individuals, and 21.5% had someone living alone who was 65 years of age or older. The average household size was 2.22 and the average family size was 2.88.

In the city, the population was spread out, with 26.0% under the age of 18, 8.3% from 18 to 24, 19.7% from 25 to 44, 25.3% from 45 to 64, and 20.8% who were 65 years of age or older. The median age was 40 years. For every 100 females, there were 74.1 males. For every 100 females age 18 and over, there were 75.4 males.

The median income for a household in the city was $18,750, and the median income for a family was $25,625. Males had a median income of $21,667 versus $21,250 for females. The per capita income for the city was $12,172. About 38.4% of families and 37.5% of the population were below the poverty line, including 56.1% of those under the age of eighteen and 23.2% of those 65 or over.

== Education ==
Mount Olivet has a lending library, the Robertson County Public Library.
