= List of bridges on the National Register of Historic Places in Kentucky =

This is a list of bridges and tunnels on the National Register of Historic Places in the U.S. state of Kentucky.

Name	Image	Built	Listed	Location	County	Type
Barren River L & N Railroad Bridge		ca. 1900	1980-11-26	Bowling Green; 37°0′10″N 86°25′56″W	Warren	Camelback
Beech Fork Bridge, Mackville Road		1884	1989-02-10	Springfield; 37°42′15″N 85°8′46″W	Washington	Pratt thru truss
Bennett's Mill Covered Bridge	Bennett's Mill Covered Bridge	ca. 1855	1976-03-26	Greenup; 38°37′50″N 82°55′37″W	Greenup	
Cabin Creek Covered Bridge		ca. 1867	1976-03-26	Tollesboro; 38°37′13″N 83°37′16″W	Lewis	Burr Truss
Cartwright Creek Bridge		1884	1989-02-10	Springfield; 37°39′34″N 85°16′23″W	Washington	Single span metal truss
Cincinnati Southern Railroad Culvert		1876	1998-04-09	Danville; 37°41′54″N 84°46′48″W	Boyle	stone culvert
Clifton Road Culvert		ca. 1821, 1865	1997-11-21	Clifton; 37°38′31″N 84°41′44″W	Boyle	stone culvert
College Street Bridge		1915	1980-11-26	Bowling Green; 36°59′48″N 86°25′50″W	Warren	
Colville Covered Bridge		1877	1974-12-30	Millersburg; 38°19′29″N 84°12′12″W	Bourbon	Burr truss
Covington and Cincinnati Suspension Bridge		1856, 1867	1975-05-15	Covington; 39°5′32″N 84°30′34″W	Kenton	Suspension bridge
Doe Run Trestle		1876-1900	1989-02-10	Springfield; 37°46′40″N 85°17′40″W	Washington	
East Main Street Bridge	East Main Street Bridge in Corbin	1890, 1905	1986-03-28	Corbin; 36°57′11.3″N 84°5′40.3″W	Knox, Whitley	Pratt through truss
General U.S. Grant Bridge		1927, 1939 demolished 2001	2001-05-31	South Portsmouth; 38°43′29″N 82°59′53″W	Greenup	Cable suspension bridge
Goddard Bridge	Goddard Bridge	1933	1975-08-22	Goddard; 38°21′44″N 83°36′56″W	Fleming	
Goose Creek Foot Bridge	Goose Creek Foot Bridge	1928	1985-04-19	Greensburg; 37°15′36″N 85°30′1″W	Green	
Hillsboro Covered Bridge		ca. 1865	1976-03-26	Hillsboro; 38°15′17″N 83°39′11″W	Fleming	
Hornsby Bridge		1903	1988-12-27	Eminence; 38°19′4″N 85°12′16″W	Shelby	
Johnson Creek Covered Bridge		1874	1976-09-27	Mount Olivet; 38°28′52″N 83°58′37″W	Robertson	Smith Truss
KY 2541 Bridge		1884	1988-01-27	Greenup; 38°34′50″N 82°50′25″W	Greenup	Pratt through truss. Demolished.
Lee's Creek Covered Bridge	Lee's Creek Covered Bridge	1835	1976-03-26	Dover; 38°44′59″N 83°52′44″W	Mason	Queenpost design
Long Lick Creek Bridge		1901-1925	1989-02-10	Willisburg; 37°48′38″N 85°12′45″W	Washington	Single span metal truss
Louisville Municipal Bridge, Pylons and Administration Building		1928, 1929	1984-03-08	Louisville	Clark, Jefferson	Warren through truss
Maysville-Aberdeen Bridge		1930, 1931	1983-06-30	Maysville; 38°39′19″N 83°45′27″W	Mason	Steel Suspension
Mitchellsburg Louisville and Nashville Railroad Culvert		ca. 1866	1998-04-09	Mitchellsburg; 37°36′5″N 84°57′10″W	Boyle	brick and stone culvert
Mount Zion Covered Bridge		1871	1976-03-26	Mooresville; 37°49′40″N 85°15′23″W	Washington	Burr truss
Newport and Cincinnati Bridge		1868, 1872, 1896	2001-04-17	Newport; 39°6′3″N 84°30′2″W	Campbell	Subdivided Pratt truss
Oldtown Covered Bridge		1880	1976-03-26	Oldtown; 38°25′53″N 82°53′42″W	Greenup	
Pauley Bridge		1940	1992-03-26	Pikeville; 37°29′33″N 82°32′8″W	Pike	Suspension bridge
Richardsville Road Bridge		1889	1980-11-26	Bowling Green; 37°1′14″N 86°26′51″W	Warren	Bowstring
Ringos Mill Covered Bridge		1867	1976-03-26	Flemingsburg; 38°16′6″N 83°36′38″W	Fleming	
Singing Bridge		1893	1976-05-10 (Listed as a contributing structure to the Frankfort Commercial Historic District)	Frankfort; 38°11′48″N 84°52′44″W	Franklin	
Stone Bridge at Chaplin Creek		ca. 1910	1998-04-09	Parksville; 37°35′51″N 84°54′38″W	Boyle	stone bridge
Switzer Covered Bridge		1855	1974-09-06	Switzer; 38°15′14″N 84°45′8″W	Franklin	
Tank Pond Railroad Underpass		1915	1998-04-09	Mitchellsburg; 37°35′44″N 84°54′39″W	Boyle	engineering structure
Town Branch Bridge		1932	1989-05-18	Prestonsburg; 37°39′49″N 82°46′23″W	Floyd	Open-spandrel rainbow arch
Valley Pike Covered Bridge	Valley Pike Covered Bridge	1864	1976-03-26 dismantled 2018	Maysville; 38°40′27″N 83°52′20″W	Mason	Single Kingpost truss
Walcott Covered Bridge		ca. 1880	1975-06-10	Brooksville; 38°44′0″N 84°6′2″W	Bracken	Queen & King post type truss
West Prestonsburg Bridge		1928	1989-05-18	Prestonsburg; 37°40′20″N 82°46′46″W	Floyd	Rainbow arch single span
Yatesville Covered Bridge		1907	1976-03-26	Fallsburg; 38°8′41″N 82°41′5″W	Lawrence	Howe truss
East Fork Covered Bridge		1924	removed 1982-04-09	Fallsburg; 38°13′01.6″N 82°44′07.5″W	Lawrence	Kingpost, demolished 1980
Sherburne Covered Suspension Bridge		1867, 1868	removed 1990-02-06	Sherburne; 38°16′47.2″N 83°48′14.4″W	Fleming	Howe truss / suspension, destroyed by fire in 1981
