= List of covered bridges in Kentucky =

Below is a list of covered bridges in Kentucky. There are eleven surviving authentic covered bridges in the U.S. state of Kentucky, and they are all historic. A covered bridge is considered authentic not due to its age, but by its construction. An authentic bridge is constructed using trusses rather than other methods such as stringers, a popular choice for non-authentic covered bridges. There once were hundreds of these in Kentucky.

== Bridges ==
=== Extant ===
Name	Image	County	Location	Built	Length	Crosses	Ownership	Truss	Notes
Bennett's Mill Covered Bridge	Bennett's Mill Covered Bridge	Greenup	Greenup; 38°37′50″N 82°55′37″W	ca. 1855, 2004	145 feet (44 m)	Tygarts Creek	County of Greenup	Modified Wheeler or Warren	
Cabin Creek Covered Bridge	Cabin Creek Covered Bridge	Lewis	Tollesboro; 38°37′13″N 83°37′16″W	ca. 1867	114 feet (35 m)	Cabin Creek	State of Kentucky	Multiple king	Also called C.F. Ferguson Farm, Mackey, or Hughes Farm Covered Bridge
Colville Covered Bridge	Colville Covered Bridge	Bourbon	Millersburg; 38°19′29″N 84°12′12″W	1877, 2002	120 feet (37 m)	Hinkston Creek	County of Bourbon	Multiple king	
Goddard Bridge	Goddard Bridge	Fleming	Goddard; 38°21′44″N 83°36′56″W	1864, 1933	60 feet (18 m)	Sand Lick Creek	County of Fleming	Town	Also called White Bridge
Hillsboro Covered Bridge	Hillsboro Covered Bridge	Fleming	Hillsboro; 38°15′17″N 83°39′11″W	ca. 1865	80 feet (24 m)	Fox Creek	County of Fleming	Multiple king	Also called Grange City Covered Bridge
Johnson Creek Covered Bridge	Johnson Creek Covered Bridge	Robertson	Mount Olivet; 38°28′52″N 83°58′37″W	1874	110 feet (34 m)	Blue Lick Springs	County of Robertson	Smith	
Lee's Creek Covered Bridge	Lee's Creek Covered Bridge	Mason	Dover; 38°44′59″N 83°52′44″W	1835	60 feet (18 m)	Lee's Creek	County of Mason	Queen	Also called Dover Covered Bridge
Oldtown Covered Bridge	Oldtown Covered Bridge	Greenup	Oldtown; 38°25′53″N 82°53′42″W	1850-1874, 1999	190 feet (58 m)	Frazer Branch, Little Sandy Creek	County of Greenup	Warren or Multiple king	
Ringos Mill Covered Bridge		Fleming	Flemingsburg; 38°16′6″N 83°36′38″W	1867	86 feet (26 m)	Fox Creek	County of Fleming	Multiple king	
Switzer Covered Bridge		Franklin	Switzer; 38°15′14″N 84°45′8″W	1855, 1998	120 feet (37 m)	North Fork, Elkhorn Creek	County of Franklin	Howe	
Walcott Covered Bridge		Bracken	Brooksville; 38°44′0″N 84°6′2″W	ca. 1880, 2001	76 feet (23 m)	Locust Creek	Private	Queen and multiple king	

=== Former ===
Name	Image	County	Location	Built	Length	Crosses	Ownership	Truss	Notes
East Fork Covered Bridge		Lawrence	Fallsburg; 38°13′01.6″N 82°44′07.5″W	1924	42 feet (13 m)	East Fork Little Sandy River		King	Demolished on July 10, 1980.
Mount Zion Covered Bridge	Mount Zion Covered Bridge	Washington	Mooresville; 37°49′40″N 85°15′23″W	1871–2021	258 feet (79 m)	Beech Fork	Kentucky Department of Highways	Burr	Also called Beech Fork Covered Bridge. Lost to arson on March 9, 2021.
Sherburne Covered Suspension Bridge		Fleming	Sherburne; 38°16′47.2″N 83°48′14.4″W	1868	253 feet (77 m)	Licking River		Howe / Suspension	Burned on April 6, 1981.
Valley Pike Covered Bridge	Valley Pike Covered Bridge	Mason	Fernleaf; 38°40′27″N 83°52′20″W	1864	35 feet (11 m)	Lee's Creek	Private	King	Also called Bouldin or Daugherty Covered Bridge. Dismantled on April 27, 2018.
Yatesville Covered Bridge		Lawrence	Fallsburg; 38°08′41.0″N 82°41′05.0″W	1907	128 feet (39 m)	Blaine Creek		Howe	Collapsed in May 1986.

== See also ==
- List of bridges on the National Register of Historic Places in Kentucky
- World Guide to Covered Bridges
