= National Register of Historic Places listings in Fleming County, Kentucky =

Location of Fleming County in Kentucky

This is a list of the National Register of Historic Places listings in Fleming County, Kentucky.

This is intended to be a complete list of the properties and districts on the National Register of Historic Places in Fleming County, Kentucky, United States. The locations of National Register properties and districts for which the latitude and longitude coordinates are included below, may be seen in a map.

There are 11 properties and districts listed on the National Register in the county. Another property was once listed but has been removed.

This National Park Service list is complete through NPS recent listings posted August 28, 2026.

== Current listings ==
	Name on the Register	Image	Date listed	Location	City or town	Description
1	Elizaville Presbyterian Church	Elizaville Presbyterian Church	June 17, 1977 (#77000616)	Kentucky Route 32; 38°25′10″N 83°49′27″W	Elizaville	
2	Ewing School		August 31, 2026 (#100013337)	210 Euclid Avenue; 38°25′41″N 83°51′50″W	Ewing	
3	First Presbyterian Church	First Presbyterian Church	August 12, 1977 (#77000617)	W. Main and W. Water Sts. 38°25′28″N 83°44′10″W	Flemingsburg	
4	Thomas W. Fleming House	Thomas W. Fleming House	March 21, 1979 (#79000983)	114 W. Water St. 38°25′22″N 83°44′04″W	Flemingsburg	
5	Flemingsburg Historic District	Flemingsburg Historic District	July 5, 1985 (#85001479)	Roughly bounded by Stockwell, Hunt, East Elm, Foxsprings, Mt. Sterling, Main Cross, and Rhoades; 38°25′20″N 83°44′03″W	Flemingsburg	
6	Goddard Bridge	Goddard Bridge	August 22, 1975 (#75000756)	Maddox Rd. at Kentucky Route 32; 38°21′44″N 83°36′56″W	Goddard	
7	Hillsboro Covered Bridge	Hillsboro Covered Bridge	March 26, 1976 (#76000881)	South of Hillsboro on Kentucky Route 111; 38°15′17″N 83°39′11″W	Hillsboro	
8	Ben Johnson House		March 1, 1982 (#82002697)	Kentucky Route 161; 38°27′56″N 83°49′19″W	Flemingsburg Junction	
9	Abraham Magowan House		June 30, 1983 (#83002772)	Maddox Pike; 38°27′19″N 83°40′19″W	Flemingsburg	
10	Ringos Mill Covered Bridge	Ringos Mill Covered Bridge	March 26, 1976 (#76000880)	13.7 miles south of Flemingsburg on Kentucky Route 158; 38°16′06″N 83°36′38″W	Flemingsburg	
11	Franklin R. Sousley Birthplace		December 31, 1974 (#74000870)	4 miles southwest of Elizaville on Kentucky Route 170; 38°21′54″N 83°50′31″W	Elizaville	

== Former listing ==
	Name on the Register	Image	Date listed	Date removed	Location	City or town	Description
1	Sherburne Covered Suspension Bridge		March 26, 1976 (#76000882)	February 6, 1990	KY 11 at Licking River; 38°16′47″N 83°48′14″W	Sherburne	Destroyed by fire on April 6, 1981

== See also ==
- List of National Historic Landmarks in Kentucky
- National Register of Historic Places listings in Kentucky
