= National Register of Historic Places listings in Scioto County, Ohio =

Location of Scioto County in Ohio

This is a list of the National Register of Historic Places listings in Scioto County, Ohio.

This is intended to be a complete list of the properties and districts on the National Register of Historic Places in Scioto County, Ohio, United States. The locations of National Register properties and districts for which the latitude and longitude coordinates are included below, may be seen in an online map.

There are 42 properties and districts listed on the National Register in the county. Another 2 properties were once listed but have been removed.

This National Park Service list is complete through NPS recent listings posted August 28, 2026.

== Current listings ==
	Name on the Register	Image	Date listed	Location	City or town	Description
1	100 Mile House		March 8, 2021 (#100006197)	4866 US 52 #D; 38°37′05″N 83°11′36″W	Stout	
2	All Saints Episcopal Church	All Saints Episcopal Church	March 25, 1982 (#82003639)	4th and Court Sts. 38°43′59″N 83°00′02″W	Portsmouth	
3	Anderson Brothers Department Store	Anderson Brothers Department Store	February 2, 2001 (#01000052)	301-307 Chillicothe St. 38°43′57″N 82°59′49″W	Portsmouth	
4	Bennett Schoolhouse Road Covered Bridge	Bennett Schoolhouse Road Covered Bridge	October 11, 1978 (#78002185)	Southeast of Minford; 38°49′45″N 82°48′26″W	Harrison Township	
5	Bigelow United Methodist Church	Bigelow United Methodist Church	December 8, 1987 (#87002073)	415 Washington St. 38°44′02″N 82°59′56″W	Portsmouth	
6	Boneyfiddle Commercial District	Boneyfiddle Commercial District	June 6, 1979 (#79001938)	Roughly bounded by Front, Washington, 3rd, and Scioto Sts. 38°43′54″N 83°00′19″W	Portsmouth	
7	Cunningham-Maier House	Cunningham-Maier House	December 8, 1987 (#87002074)	506 6th St. 38°44′05″N 83°00′09″W	Portsmouth	
8	Dole-Darrell House	Dole-Darrell House	December 8, 1987 (#87002075)	322 Market St. 38°43′59″N 83°00′10″W	Portsmouth	
9	Elden House	Elden House	December 8, 1987 (#87002076)	634 4th St. 38°43′59″N 82°59′58″W	Portsmouth	
10	Evangelical Church of Christ	Evangelical Church of Christ	December 8, 1987 (#87002077)	701 5th St. 38°44′03″N 82°59′54″W	Portsmouth	
11	Feurt Mounds and Village Site	Feurt Mounds and Village Site	June 18, 1973 (#73001531)	Eastern bank of the Scioto River along the western side of U.S. Route 23, north of Portsmouth; 38°48′21″N 82°59′19″W	Clay Township	
12	First Presbyterian Church	First Presbyterian Church	November 28, 1973 (#73001532)	221 Court St. 38°43′56″N 83°00′04″W	Portsmouth	
13	George H. Gharky House	George H. Gharky House	December 8, 1987 (#87002078)	638 4th St. 38°43′58″N 82°59′56″W	Portsmouth	
14	General U.S. Grant Bridge	General U.S. Grant Bridge	May 31, 2001 (#01000560)	Spanning the Ohio River, beginning at the intersection of Chillicothe and 2nd Sts. 38°43′50″N 82°59′49″W	Portsmouth	Extended into Greenup County, Kentucky. Demolished in 2001.
15	Greenlawn Cemetery Chapel	Greenlawn Cemetery Chapel	January 3, 1980 (#80003216)	Offnere St. 38°44′38″N 82°59′04″W	Portsmouth	
16	Horseshoe Mound	Horseshoe Mound	May 2, 1974 (#74001621)	Within Mound Park; 38°44′35″N 82°58′40″W	Portsmouth	
17	Hurth Hotel	Hurth Hotel	July 28, 1983 (#83002056)	222 Chillicothe St. 38°43′56″N 82°59′48″W	Portsmouth	
18	Aaron Kinney House	Aaron Kinney House	July 2, 1973 (#73001533)	Waller St. 38°44′51″N 82°59′19″W	Portsmouth	
19	Eli Kinney House	Eli Kinney House	March 10, 1988 (#87002079)	317 Court St. 38°43′59″N 83°00′04″W	Portsmouth	
20	Labold House and Gardens	Labold House and Gardens	December 8, 1987 (#87002085)	633 4th St. 38°44′00″N 82°59′57″W	Portsmouth	
21	Joseph Marsh House	Joseph Marsh House	December 8, 1987 (#87002087)	701 Market St. 38°44′09″N 83°00′11″W	Portsmouth	
22	Eugene McKinley Memorial Pool		August 8, 2019 (#100004233)	1529 Findlay St. 38°44′36″N 82°59′35″W	Portsmouth	
23	Meyer House	Meyer House	March 10, 1988 (#87002088)	309 Washington St. 38°43′58″N 82°59′56″W	Portsmouth	
24	Philip Moore Stone House	Philip Moore Stone House	October 21, 1975 (#75001531)	South of West Portsmouth on State Route 239; 38°44′36″N 83°02′02″W	Washington Township	
25	William Newman House	William Newman House	December 8, 1987 (#87002089)	716 2nd St. 38°43′53″N 82°59′54″W	Portsmouth	
26	Odd Fellows Hall	Odd Fellows Hall	December 8, 1987 (#87002090)	500-506 Court St. 38°44′03″N 83°00′02″W	Portsmouth	
27	Ohio and Erie Canal Southern Descent Historic District		April 1, 2019 (#100003572)	Multiple; Old River Rd. at Slab Run; 38°43′34″N 83°01′53″W	Portsmouth vicinity	Boundary increase approved September 2, 2022; extends into other Ohio counties
28	Otway Covered Bridge	Otway Covered Bridge	May 3, 1974 (#74002280)	North of State Route 348; 38°51′46″N 83°11′24″W	Otway	
29	Portsmouth Fire Department No. 1	Portsmouth Fire Department No. 1	December 8, 1987 (#87002091)	642 7th St. 38°44′08″N 82°59′56″W	Portsmouth	
30	Portsmouth Foundry and Machine Works	Portsmouth Foundry and Machine Works	December 8, 1987 (#87002095)	401 3rd St. 38°43′57″N 83°00′18″W	Portsmouth	
31	Purdum-Tracy House	Purdum-Tracy House	December 8, 1987 (#87002097)	626 4th St. 38°43′59″N 82°59′59″W	Portsmouth	
32	Joseph G. Reed Company	Joseph G. Reed Company	December 8, 1987 (#87002099)	700 2nd St. 38°43′53″N 82°59′56″W	Portsmouth	
33	St. Mary's Roman Catholic Church	St. Mary's Roman Catholic Church	August 24, 1979 (#79001940)	5th and Market Sts. 38°44′04″N 83°00′08″W	Portsmouth	
34	Scioto County Courthouse	Scioto County Courthouse	December 8, 1987 (#87002101)	Bounded by 7th, Court, 6th, and Washington Sts. 38°44′07″N 83°00′01″W	Portsmouth	
35	Second Presbyterian Church	Second Presbyterian Church	August 22, 1996 (#96000926)	801 Waller St. 38°44′11″N 82°59′24″W	Portsmouth	
36	Second Street Historic District	Second Street Historic District	November 30, 1983 (#83004336)	2nd St. 38°43′52″N 82°59′25″W	Portsmouth	
37	Sixth Street Historic District	Sixth Street Historic District	March 10, 1988 (#87002103)	533, 534, 537, 538, 541, 542, 543, 547, and 548 6th St., west of Court St. 38°44′05″N 83°00′04″W	Portsmouth	
38	Steindam House	Steindam House	December 8, 1987 (#87002104)	725 Court St. 38°44′12″N 83°00′03″W	Portsmouth	
39	Streich Apartments	Streich Apartments	December 8, 1987 (#87002105)	716-722 Washington St. 38°44′10″N 82°59′54″W	Portsmouth	
40	Tremper Mound and Works	Tremper Mound and Works	December 8, 1972 (#72001041)	West of State Routes 73 and 104 north of West Portsmouth; 38°48′06″N 83°00′36″W	Rush Township	
41	Tripp-Bauer Building	Tripp-Bauer Building	June 9, 1988 (#88000719)	51-53 N. Jackson St. 38°49′00″N 82°43′34″W	South Webster	
42	Zottman House	Zottman House	August 8, 1996 (#96000882)	11 Offnere St. 38°43′46″N 82°59′09″W	Portsmouth	

== Former listings ==
	Name on the Register	Image	Date listed	Date removed	Location	City or town	Description
1	Lyric Theater		May 15, 1974 (#74001622)	December 1, 1974	820 Gallia Street; 38°44′04″N 82°59′43″W	Portsmouth	
2	Judge William V. Peck House	Judge William V. Peck House	November 15, 1979 (#79001939)	January 31, 1995	601 Market St. 38°44′03″N 83°00′11″W	Portsmouth	

== See also ==
- List of National Historic Landmarks in Ohio
- Listings in neighboring counties: Adams, Greenup (KY), Jackson, Lawrence, Lewis (KY), Pike
- National Register of Historic Places listings in Ohio
