= National Register of Historic Places listings in Greenup County, Kentucky =

Location of Greenup County in Kentucky

This is a list of the National Register of Historic Places listings in Greenup County, Kentucky.

This is intended to be a complete list of the properties and districts on the National Register of Historic Places in Greenup County, Kentucky, United States. The locations of National Register properties and districts for which the latitude and longitude coordinates are included below, may be seen in a map.

There are 20 properties and districts listed on the National Register in the county.

This National Park Service list is complete through NPS recent listings posted May 2, 2025.

== Current listings ==
	Name on the Register	Image	Date listed	Location	City or town	Description
1	Bennett's Mill Covered Bridge	Bennett's Mill Covered Bridge	March 26, 1976 (#76000892)	Kentucky Route 2125 west of Greenup; 38°37′50″N 82°55′37″W	Greenup	
2	Front Street District	Front Street District	January 27, 1988 (#87002448)	Front St. 38°34′39″N 82°50′03″W	Greenup	
3	General U.S. Grant Bridge	General U.S. Grant Bridge	May 31, 2001 (#01000560)	Ohio River-Chillicothe and 2nd St. 38°43′29″N 82°59′53″W	South Portsmouth	Extends into Scioto County, Ohio. Demolished in 2001.
4	Greenup Masonic Lodge	Greenup Masonic Lodge	January 27, 1988 (#87002447)	314 Main St. 38°34′40″N 82°50′12″W	Greenup	
5	Kouns-Hoffman House	Kouns-Hoffman House	January 27, 1988 (#87002445)	208 Jefferson St. 38°34′37″N 82°50′00″W	Greenup	
6	KY 2541 Bridge	KY 2541 Bridge	January 27, 1988 (#87002446)	Main St. over the Little Sandy River; 38°34′50″N 82°50′25″W	Greenup	
7	Lower Shawneetown	Lower Shawneetown	April 28, 1983 (#83002784)	Northwest of Kentucky Route 8; 38°42′54″N 83°01′42″W	South Portsmouth	
8	Lower Shawneetown Archeological District	Lower Shawneetown Archeological District	November 29, 1985 (#85003334)	Scattered around South Portsmouth; 38°42′58″N 83°01′21″W	South Portsmouth	Includes Lower Shawneetown and Group A of the Portsmouth Earthworks, and extends into Lewis County
9	McConnell House, Law Office, and Slave Quarters	McConnell House, Law Office, and Slave Quarters	July 30, 1975 (#75000764)	West of Wurtland on U.S. Route 23; 38°33′07″N 82°47′19″W	Wurtland	
10	McKee House	McKee House	January 27, 1988 (#87002439)	1023 Riverside Dr. 38°34′28″N 82°49′47″W	Greenup	
11	Methodist Episcopal Church South	Methodist Episcopal Church South	January 27, 1988 (#87002444)	Main St. 38°34′36″N 82°50′05″W	Greenup	
12	Oldtown Covered Bridge	Oldtown Covered Bridge	March 26, 1976 (#76000893)	South of Oldtown off Kentucky Route 1; 38°25′53″N 82°53′42″W	Oldtown	
13	Portsmouth Earthworks, Group A	Portsmouth Earthworks, Group A	December 4, 1980 (#80001534)	Between County Route 8 and the Ohio River, west of South Portsmouth; 38°43′18″N 83°01′23″W	South Portsmouth	
14	Russell Railroad YMCA	Russell Railroad YMCA	May 2, 2001 (#01000452)	451 Verhon St. 38°32′02″N 82°41′52″W	Russell	
15	South Greenup District	South Greenup District	January 27, 1988 (#87002443)	Roughly bounded by the C&O railroad line, Laurel St., Seaton Ave., and Washington St. 38°34′37″N 82°50′19″W	Greenup	
16	Jesse Stuart House	Jesse Stuart House	June 1, 1982 (#82002700)	Stuarts Lane off W. Hollow Rd. 38°33′02″N 82°50′13″W	Greenup	
17	Warnock House	Warnock House	January 27, 1988 (#87002442)	404 Harrison; 38°34′38″N 82°50′14″W	Greenup	
18	West Main Street District	West Main Street District	January 27, 1988 (#87002441)	W. Main St. 38°34′44″N 82°50′18″W	Greenup	
19	Worthington House	Worthington House	January 27, 1988 (#87002438)	U.S. Route 23 at Academy Rd. 38°34′06″N 82°49′56″W	Greenup	
20	Wurtland Union Church	Wurtland Union Church	December 4, 2008 (#08001119)	325 Wurtland Ave. 38°33′02″N 82°46′52″W	Wurtland	

== See also ==
- List of National Historic Landmarks in Kentucky
- National Register of Historic Places listings in Kentucky
- Majestic (riverboat). NHL listed in Cincinnati, currently moored in Greenup.
