= National Register of Historic Places listings in Lewis County, Kentucky =

Location of Lewis County in Kentucky

This is a list of the National Register of Historic Places listings in Lewis County, Kentucky.

It is intended to be a complete list of the properties on the National Register of Historic Places in Lewis County, Kentucky, United States. The locations of National Register properties for which the latitude and longitude coordinates are included below, may be seen in a map.

There are 6 properties listed on the National Register in the county.

This National Park Service list is complete through NPS recent listings posted March 14, 2025.

== Current listings ==
	Name on the Register	Image	Date listed	Location	City or town	Description
1	Cabin Creek Covered Bridge	Cabin Creek Covered Bridge	March 26, 1976 (#76000912)	4.5 miles northwest of Tollesboro on Kentucky Route 984; 38°36′34″N 83°37′16″W	Tollesboro	
2	Hammond-Queen House	Hammond-Queen House	June 27, 2014 (#14000424)	156 2nd St. 38°36′01″N 83°18′57″W	Vanceburg	
3	Lower Shawneetown Archeological District	Lower Shawneetown Archeological District	November 29, 1985 (#85003334)	Address Restricted	Kirkville	Extends into Greenup County
4	Ohio River Lock and Dam No. 31 Grounds and Buildings	Ohio River Lock and Dam No. 31 Grounds and Buildings	May 12, 1987 (#87000479)	Rt. 1, Box 18; 38°41′56″N 83°02′36″W	Kirkville	
5	Stone Cellar on Cabin Creek	Stone Cellar on Cabin Creek	January 8, 1987 (#87000168)	Cabin Creek Rd. 38°36′02″N 83°35′31″W	Tollesboro	
6	Union Monument in Vanceburg	Union Monument in Vanceburg	July 17, 1997 (#97000683)	Courthouse lawn, 0.3 miles east of the junction of KY 8 and KY 10; 38°36′00″N 83°18′59″W	Vanceburg	

== See also ==
- List of National Historic Landmarks in Kentucky
- National Register of Historic Places listings in Kentucky
