= Evangelical Church of Christ =

Evangelical Church of Christ can refer to:

== United States ==
- A Mormon fundamentalist sect established in 1975 by John W. Bryant
- On the National Register of Historic Places
  - Evangelical Church of Christ (Portsmouth, Ohio)
