= Captain Andrew Offutt Monument =

- Capt. Andrew Offutt Monument
- U.S. National Register of Historic Places
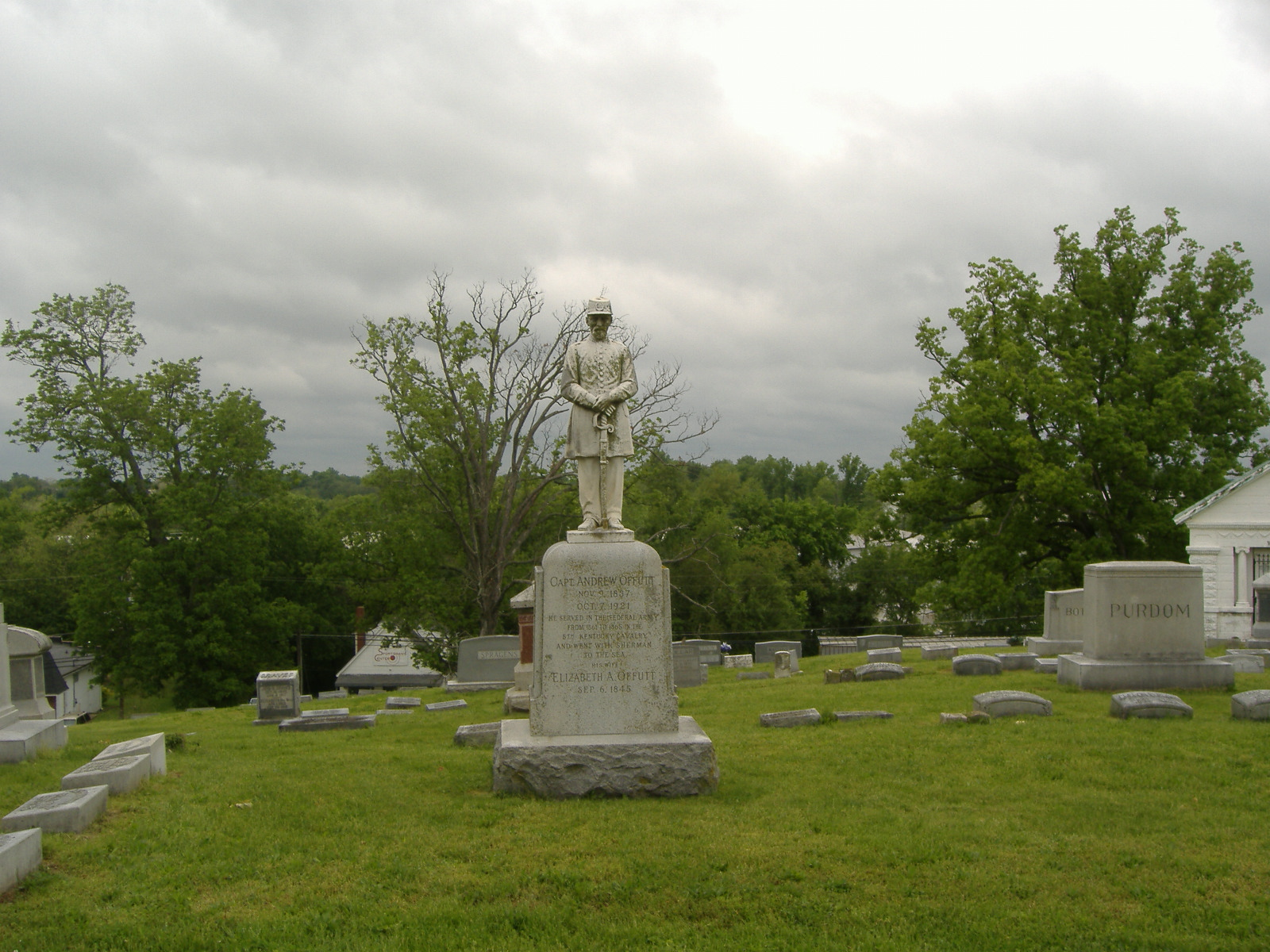

- Location within Kentucky Location within the United States
- Location: Lebanon, Kentucky
- Built: 1921
- MPS: Civil War Monuments of Kentucky MPS
- NRHP reference No.: 97000680
- Added to NRHP: July 17, 1997

The Captain Andrew Offutt Monument in Ryder Cemetery in eastern Lebanon, Kentucky, off US-68, is a monument on the National Register of Historic Places. It honors Captain Andrew Offutt (November 9, 1837 – October 7, 1921) who served as a Union officer in the 5th Kentucky Cavalry during the American Civil War, participating in General William Tecumseh Sherman's March. It is speculated that he must have seen his actions during the war as his greatest life's act, as he lived for 56 years after the war, yet his family chose to depict him in his Union Army uniform.

The monument features a marble statue of Captain Andrew Offutt atop a granite base. Offutt is seen in Union officer uniform, wearing a kepi hat and tunic length coat, with a sword extending downward. On both sides of Offutt's grave are two other veterans of the War, one of whom was a Confederate who rode with John Hunt Morgan, Doctor W. W. Cleaver.

On July 17, 1997, the Captain Andrew Offutt Monument was one of sixty different monuments related to the Civil War in Kentucky placed on the National Register of Historic Places, as part of the Civil War Monuments of Kentucky Multiple Property Submission. It is one of the few monuments dedicated for a Union soldier/unit. In fact, except for the Union Monument in Vanceburg, it is the only one to express strong sentiment for the Union cause, and this was only reflected by the monument mentioning Offutt's actions with General William T. Sherman.
