= All Saints Episcopal Church (Portsmouth, Ohio) =

Historic church in Ohio, United States

- U.S. National Register of Historic Places
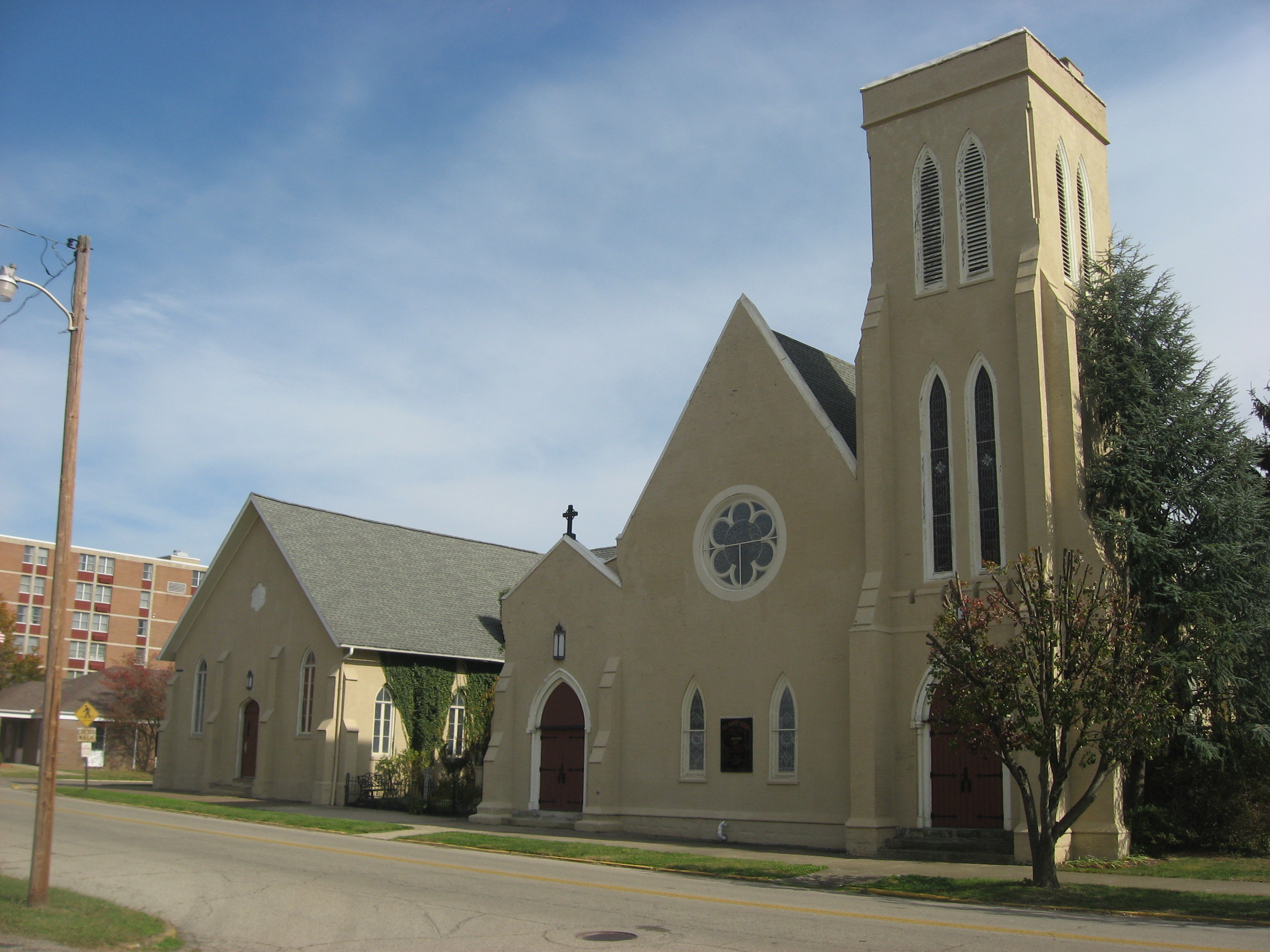
- Front of the church

- Location within Ohio Location within the United States
- Location: 4th and Court Sts., Portsmouth, Ohio
- Coordinates: 38°43′58″N 83°0′1″W
- Area: Less than 1 acre (0.40 ha)
- Built: 1833, 1850, 1880s, 1953
- Built by: William Newman
- Architectural style: Gothic Revival
- NRHP reference No.: 82003639
- Added to NRHP: 25 March 1982

All Saints Episcopal Church is a historic building in Portsmouth, Ohio. The church is a congregation of the Episcopal Diocese of Southern Ohio.

In 2023, the church reported 140 members. Average Sunday Attendance (ASA) reported by the church in 2024 was 41 persons. This was a relative decrease from ASA of 68 persons reported in 2019. No membership statistics were reported in 2024 national parochial reports.

== Description ==
It is located at 610 4th Street. The main part of the church building was constructed in 1850 by William Newman and is an example of Gothic Revival architecture, the first of that style in Portsmouth. It was built in four sections the first in 1833. Sitting on a stone foundation the brick building has multiple steeply pitched gable roofs. Windows are separated by buttresses and topped by lancet arches. The main section, built in 1850, is a 52-by-86-foot (16 by 26 m) nave with a high altar. A two-story tower with paired narrow windows rises from the southwest corner of the nave. The facade of this mass has a large central rose window and two compounded gothic arch entries each with double vertical board doors. The section of the building called the guild hall was built in two sections. The first, from 1833, was the original church and retains its original 47 by 34 feet (14 by 10 m) stone foundation. A section was added to the west in the 1880s with a brick foundation and fenestration and buttresses similar to the main mass. The entries to the guild hall section have Tudor arches. Another addition was made in 1953 consisting of a two-story 60 by 41 feet (18 by 12 m) cement block with parish house, offices and classrooms.

== History ==
In 1855 it was the first public building in the city to use gas lighting. It has survived an interior fire in 1893 and extensive flood damage in the Ohio River flood of 1937.

On June 23, 1819, the Episcopal Parish of All Saints of Portsmouth, Ohio was organized in the home of John Smith. The first rector, installed on June 19, 1831, was Henry Caswell. A sanctuary was built on the church property in 1833, the church website states that the cornerstone for this building was the first for any church in the Portsmouth area. The main building was erected in 1850. The nave was updated in 1972 then in 1995 it was restored. Remaining original furnishings include the baptismal font, the low altar and an original pew. A chalice from the 1820 visit of Philander Chase, Bishop of Ohio is on display in the narthex set in a niche. It was listed in the National Register on March 25, 1982, significant primarily as striking example of Gothic Revival architecture.

An organ originally built in 1962 by the Schlicker Organ Co. of Buffalo, New York and renovated and updated by Peebles–Herzog Inc. of Columbus, Ohio in 2006 is installed in the church.

== See also ==
- National Register of Historic Places listings in Scioto County, Ohio
