= Union Monument in Vanceburg =

- U.S. National Register of Historic Places
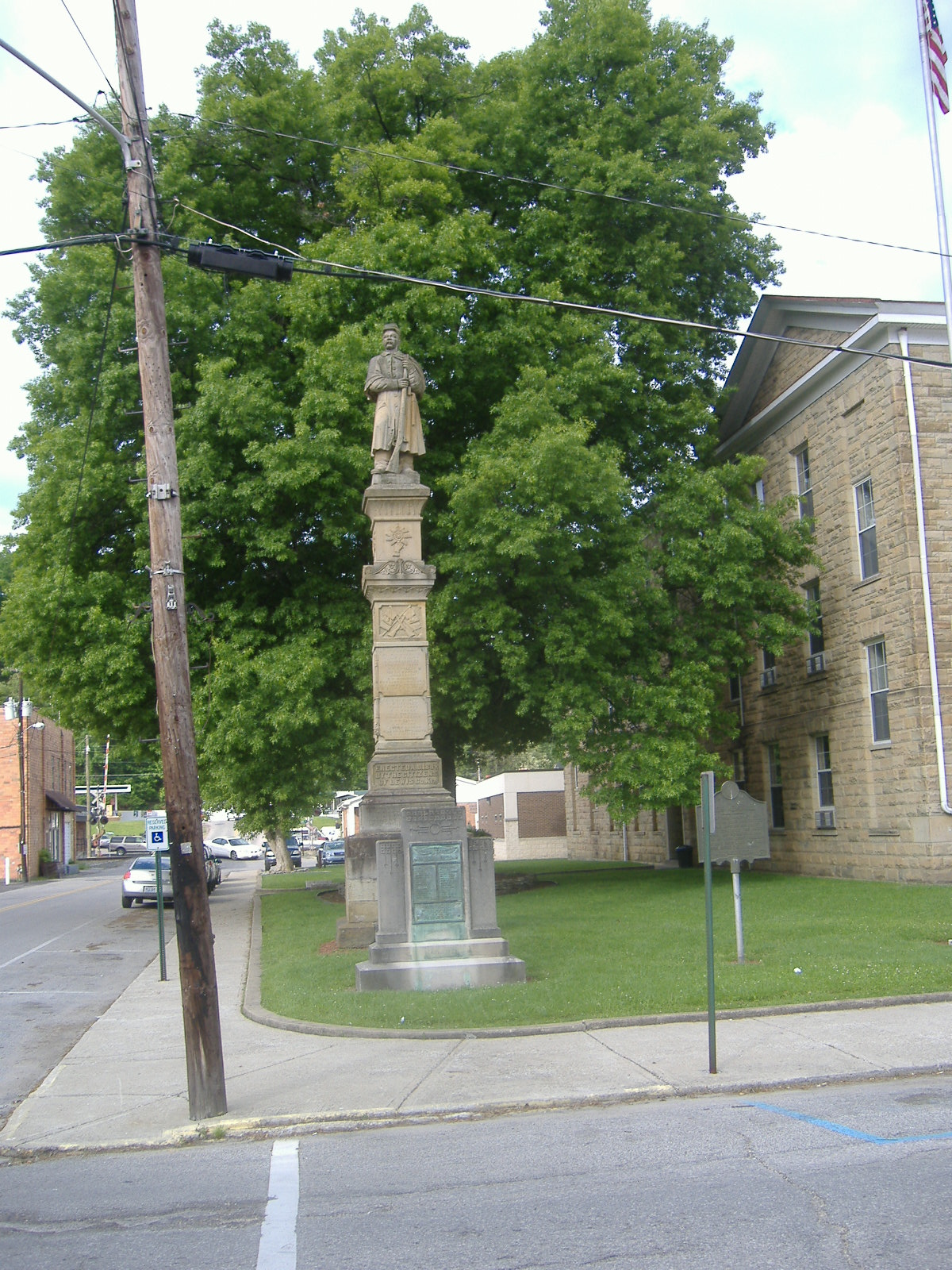

- Location within Kentucky Location within the United States
- Location: Courthouse Lawn. 0.3 mi. E of jct. of KY 8 and KY 10., Vanceburg, Kentucky
- Built: 1884
- MPS: Civil War Monuments of Kentucky
- NRHP reference No.: 97000683
- Added to NRHP: July 17, 1997

The Union Monument in Vanceburg in Lewis County, Kentucky, in Vanceburg, Kentucky, commemorates the Union soldiers of the American Civil War.

The monument was built in 1884 by the citizens of Lewis County, which was a Union stronghold during the war and one of the few places in Kentucky that was still more sympathetic to the Union cause by the 1880s. It stands thirty-four feet tall, and both the pedestal and base are made of limestone. The base is five feet high and seven feet wide. The pedestal was made from eight separate pieces. The statue depicts a Union soldier in winter gear and kepi hat.

The inscription reads:

“THE WAR FOR THE UNION WAS RIGHT, EVERLASTINGLY RIGHT; AND THE WAR AGAINST THE UNION WAS WRONG, FOREVER WRONG.”

In total, 107 men from Lewis County died as Union soldiers during the war; their names are inscribed on the monument.

On July 17, 1997, the Union Monument in Vanceburg was one of sixty-one different monuments related to the Civil War in Kentucky placed on the National Register of Historic Places, as part of the Civil War Monuments of Kentucky Multiple Property Submission. The vast majority of the monuments were built to honor Confederates. The only other monument to state any strong sentiment towards the Union is the Captain Andrew Offutt Monument in Lebanon, Kentucky. Other monuments built for the Union side include the 32nd Indiana Monument, GAR Monument in Covington, Union Monument in Louisville, and the Union Monument in Perryville.

== Gallery ==
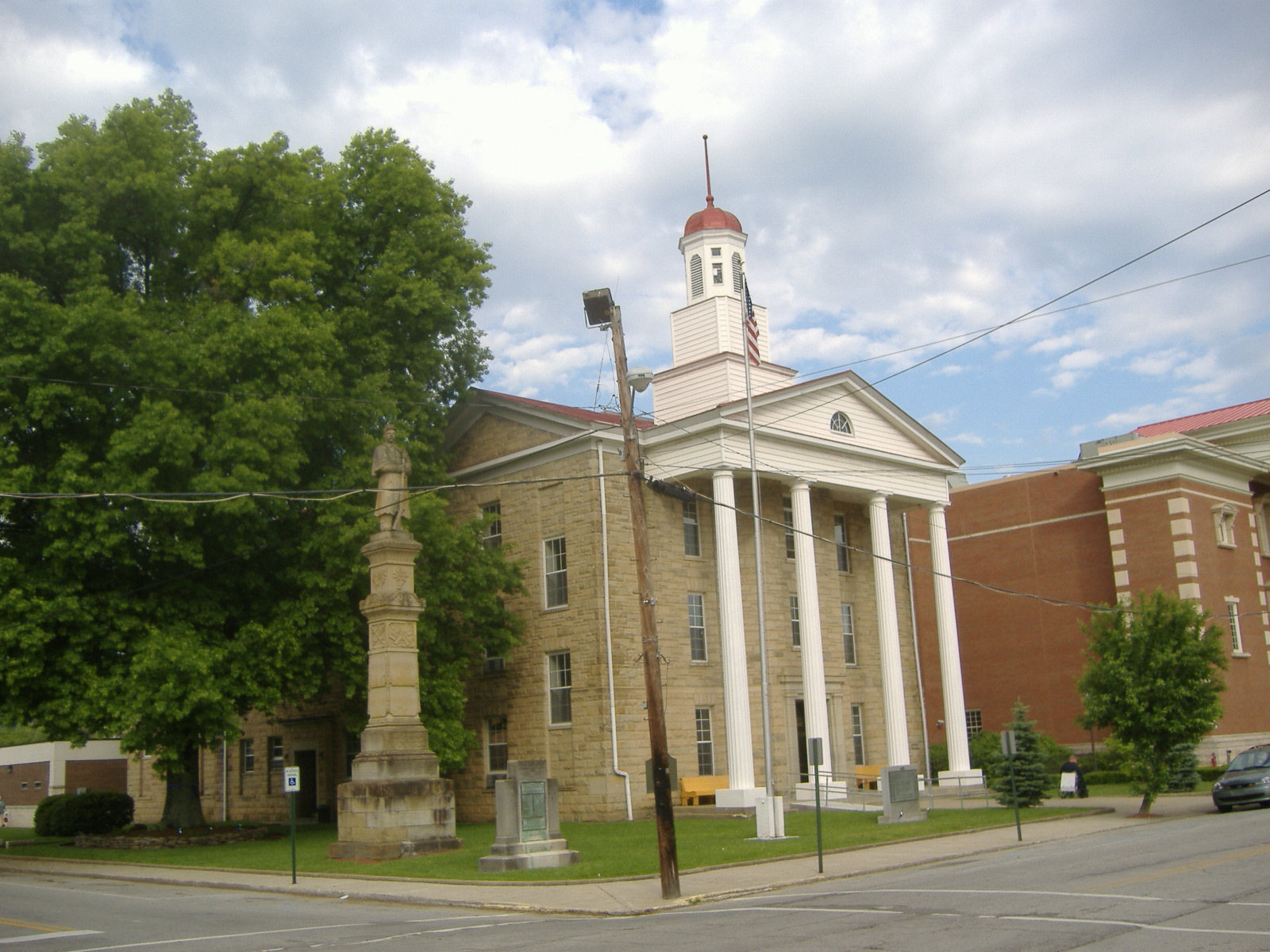
View of monument with courthouse

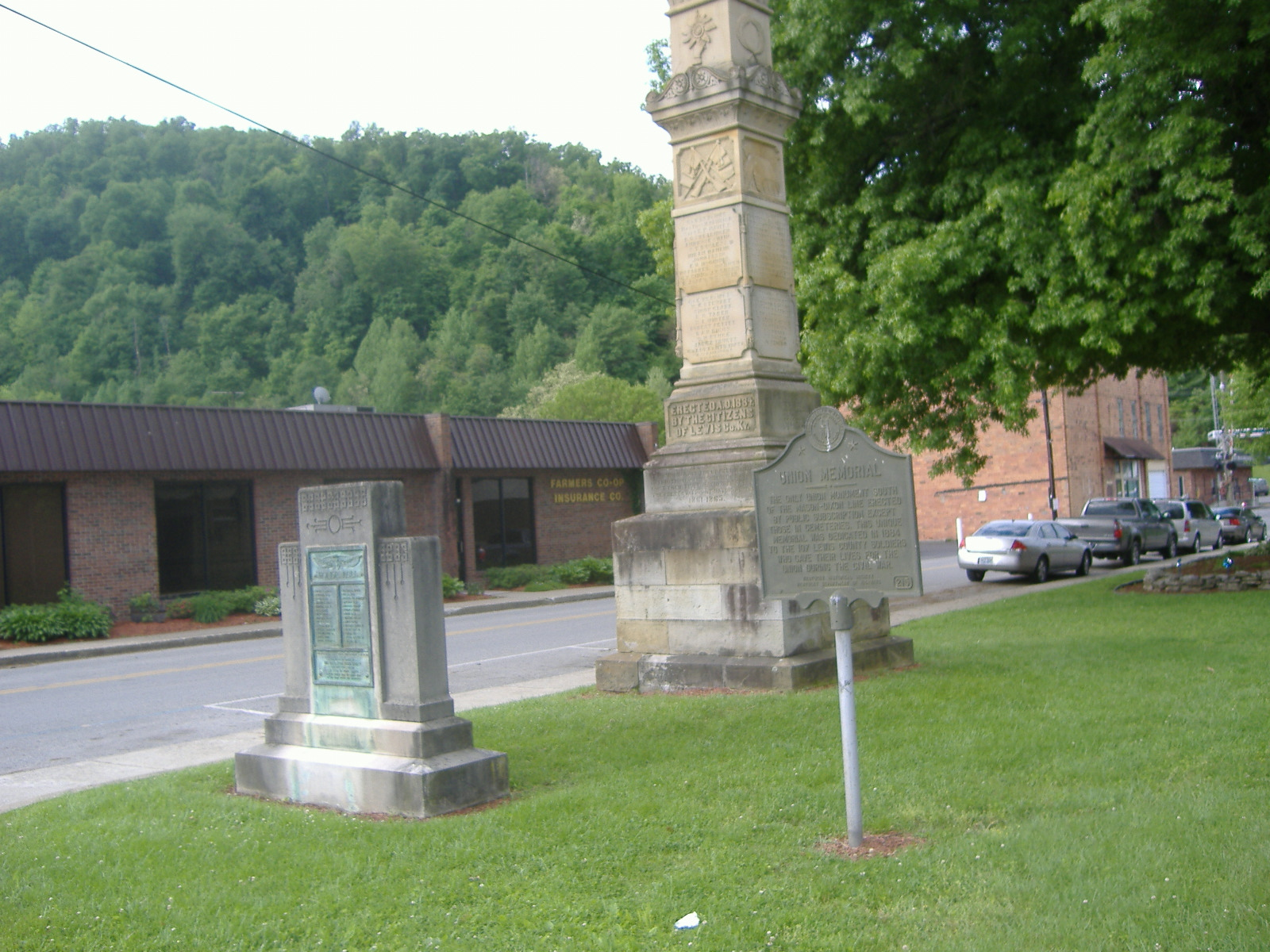
Various signs by the monument

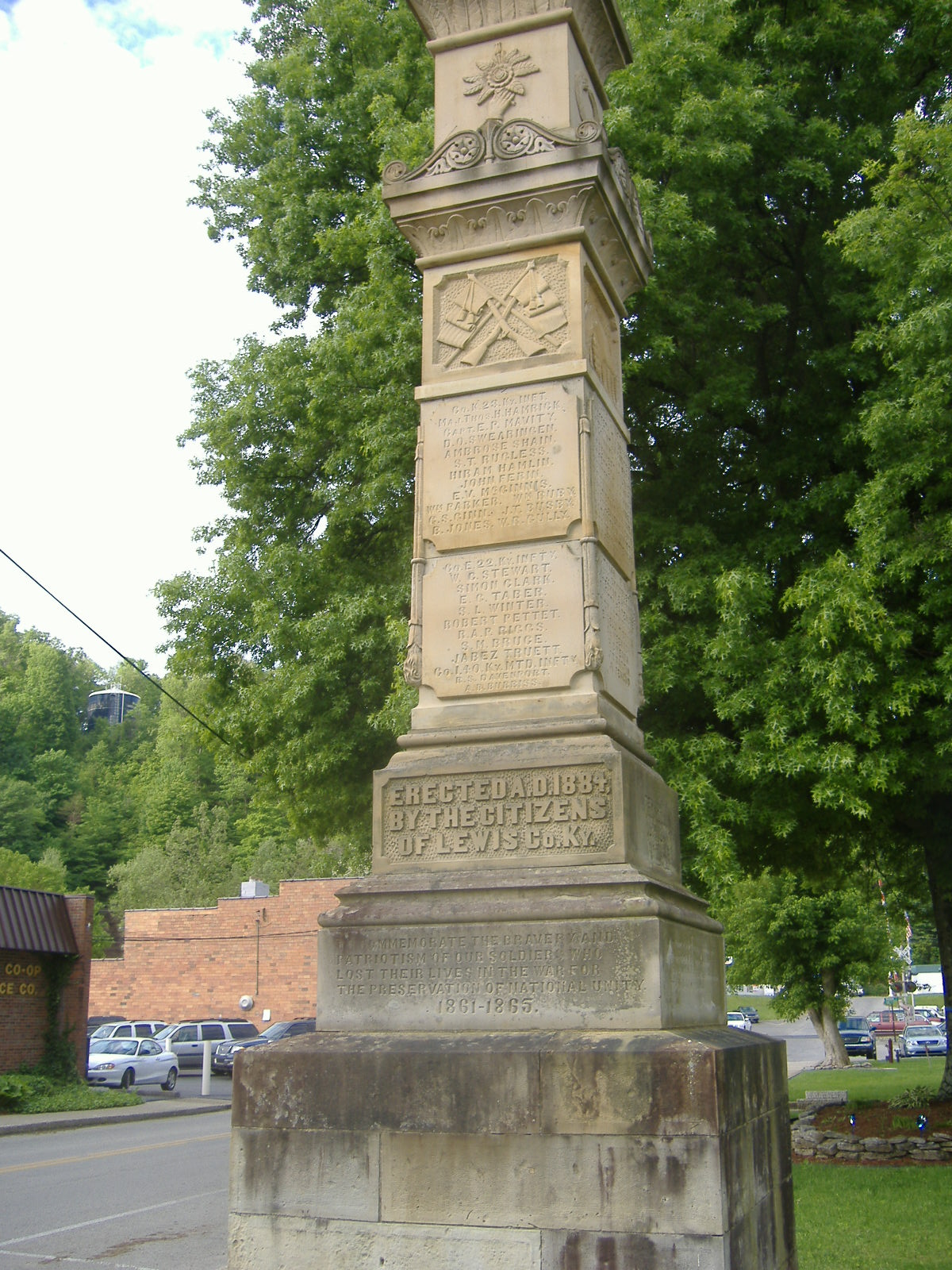
Inscription closeup of the monument

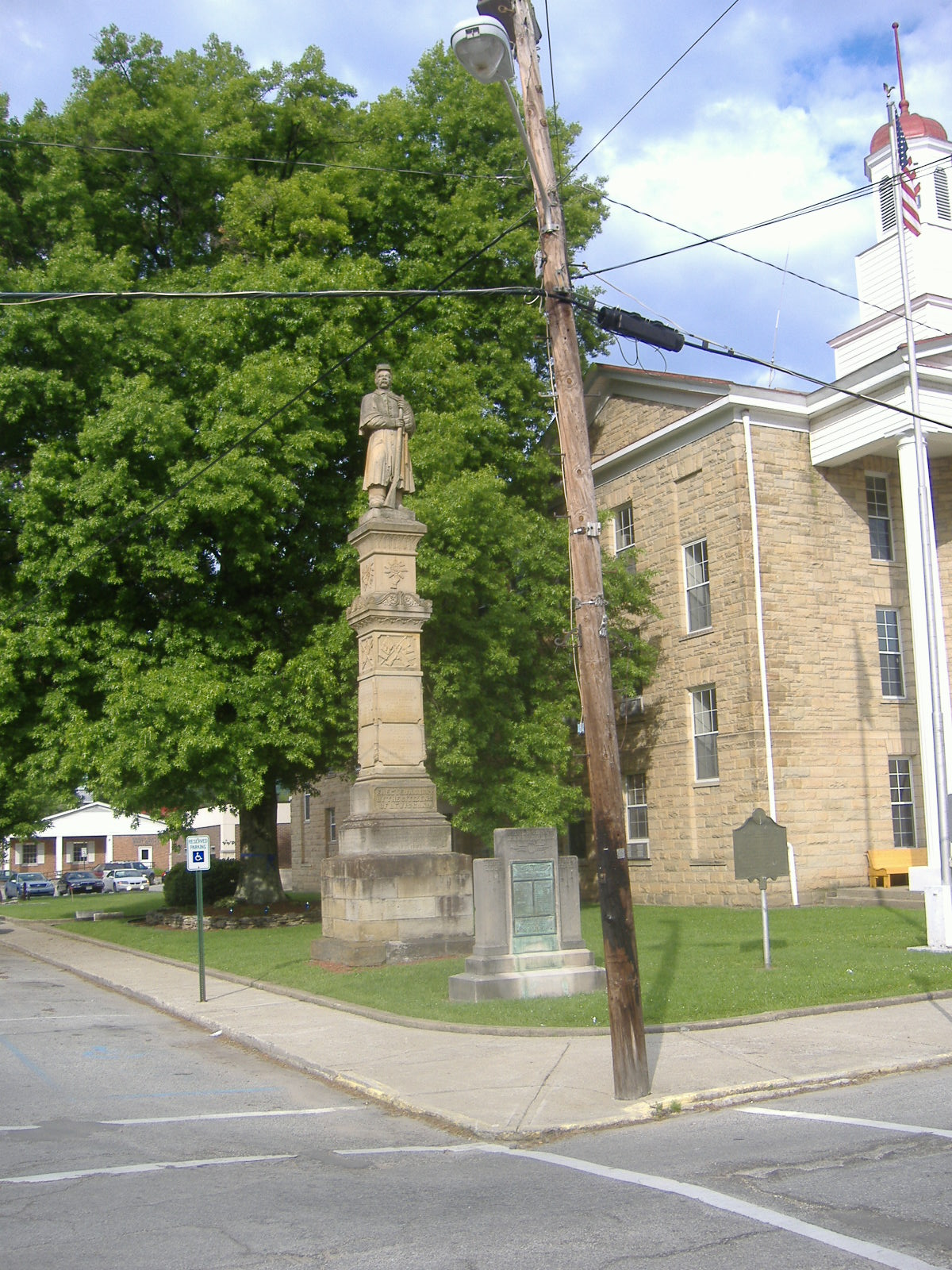
