= East Main Street Bridge (Corbin, Kentucky) =

- U.S. National Register of Historic Places
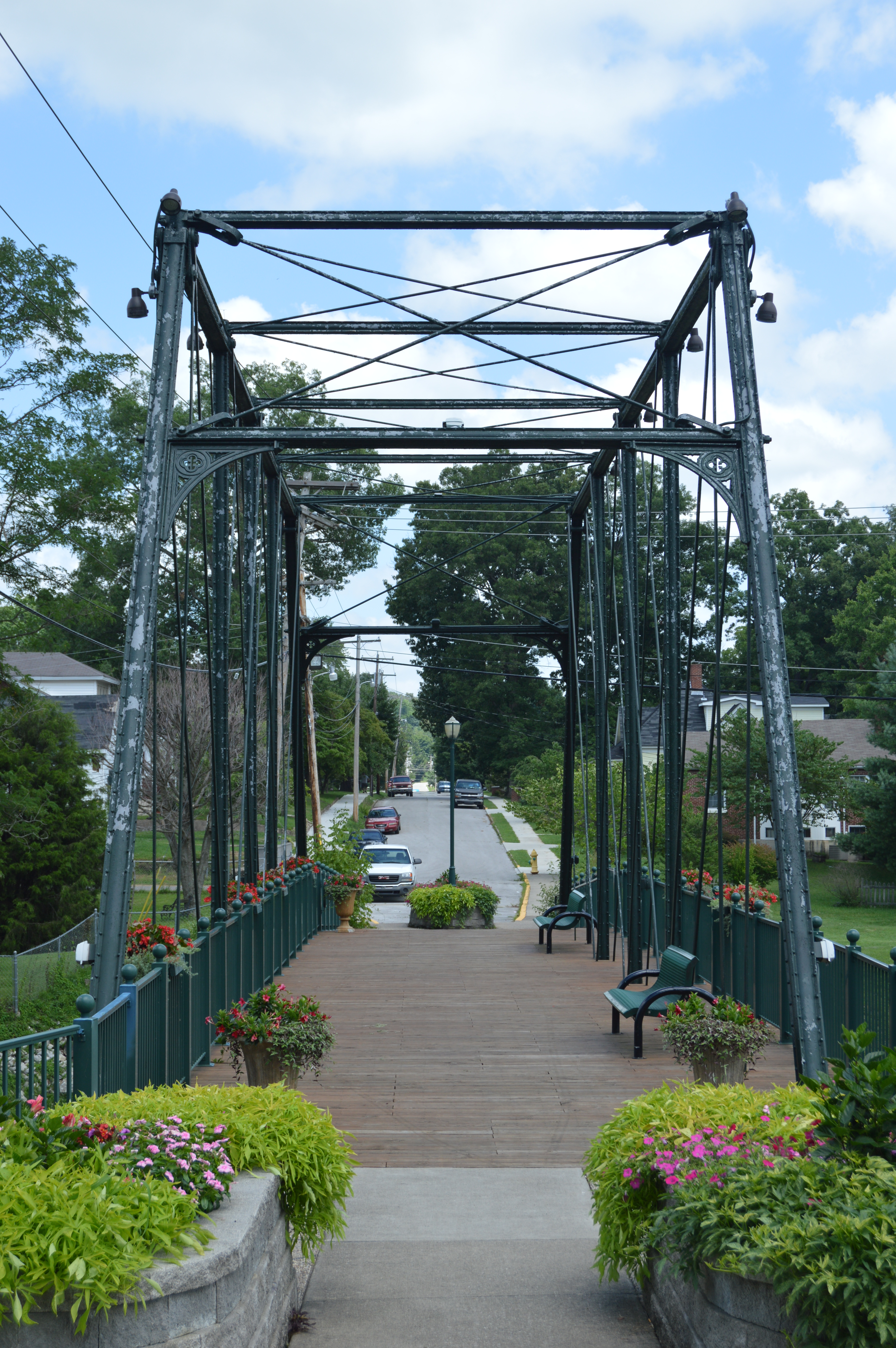

- Location within Kentucky Location within the United States
- Location: Engineers St. and Lynn Camp, Corbin, Kentucky
- Coordinates: 36°57′11″N 84°05′40″W
- Area: 0.1 acres (0.040 ha)
- Built: 1890
- Built by: Louisville Bridge; Et al.
- Architectural style: Pratt through truss
- MPS: Corbin MRA
- NRHP reference No.: 86000605
- Added to NRHP: March 28, 1986

The East Main Street Bridge in Corbin, Kentucky, spanning Lynn Camp Creek between Knox County, Kentucky and Whitley County, Kentucky, was built in 1890. Also known as the Engineers Street Bridge, it was listed on the National Register of Historic Places in 1986.

It is a Pratt truss through truss bridge built by the Louisville Bridge Co. It brings Engineers St. (formerly E. Main St.) across Lynn Camp Creek in Corbin.

It was an old bridge of the Louisville and Nashville Railroad which was offered to the city in 1902. They donated the railroad bridge which was moved into place in 1905 as a road bridge, which was later converted to a pedestrian bridge.
