= Greenup Masonic Lodge =

- U.S. National Register of Historic Places
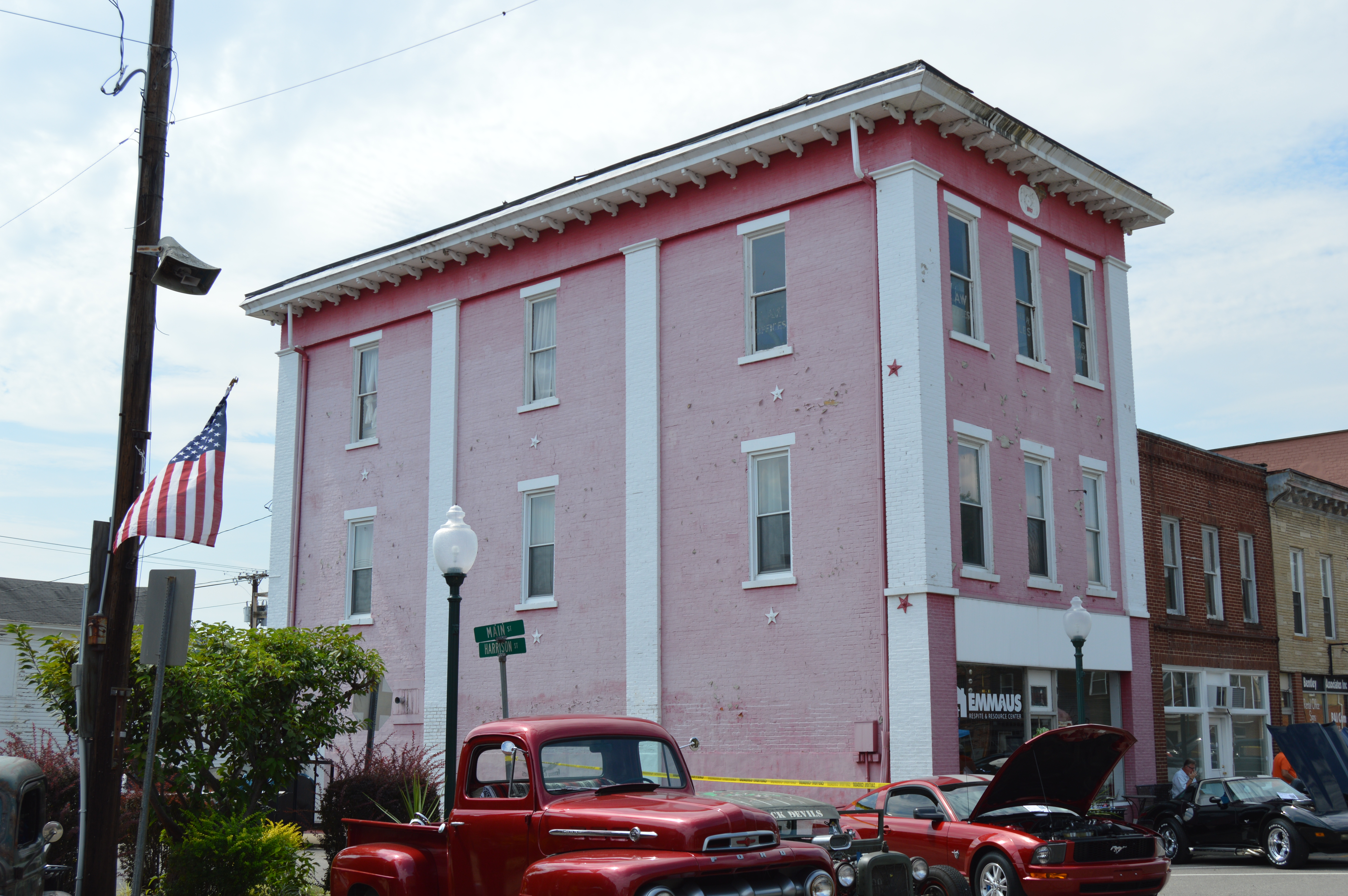
- Location: 314 Main St., Greenup, Kentucky
- Coordinates: 38°34′40″N 82°50′12″W
- Area: 0.1 acres (0.040 ha)
- Built: 1867
- Architectural style: Greek Revival, Italianate
- MPS: Greenup MRA
- NRHP reference No.: 87002447
- Added to NRHP: January 27, 1988

The Greenup Masonic Lodge, located at 314 Main St. in Greenup, Kentucky, is a three-story brick building constructed in 1867. It was listed on the National Register of Historic Places in 1988.

It is a combination Masonic lodge hall and commercial building. It was deemed notable "as Greenup's best exampie of how Greek Revival and Italianate stylistic elements were combined to create impressive commercial buildings after the Civil War." It was built for the Greenup Masonic Lodge, which was organized in 1827. The lodge incorporated in 1868 in order to build the building.

It has also been known as Leslie's Drugstore.
