= Oldtown Covered Bridge =

- U.S. National Register of Historic Places
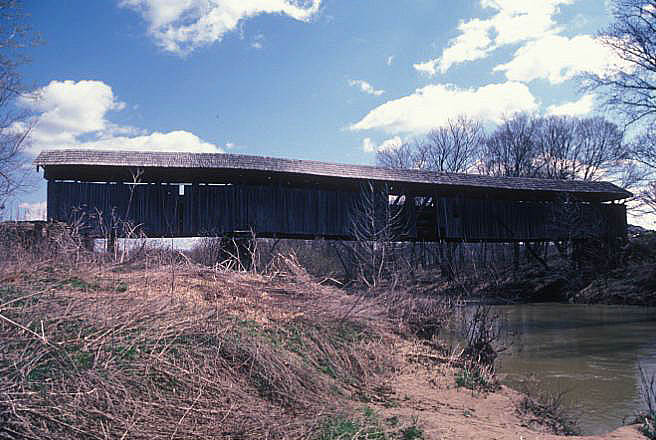

- Location within Kentucky Location within the United States
- Nearest city: Oldtown, Kentucky
- Coordinates: 38°25′53″N 82°53′42″W
- Area: 2 acres (0.81 ha)
- NRHP reference No.: 76000893
- Added to NRHP: March 26, 1976

Oldtown Covered Bridge, near Oldtown, Kentucky, was listed on the National Register of Historic Places in 1976.

It is located east of Kentucky Route 1, south of Oldtown. It brings Frazer Branch Road 750 over the Little Sandy River. It is a two-span Burr truss bridge.

== See also ==
- Bennett's Mill Covered Bridge: also in Greenup County, Kentucky
- National Register of Historic Places listings in Greenup County, Kentucky
