= Switzer Covered Bridge =

- U.S. National Register of Historic Places
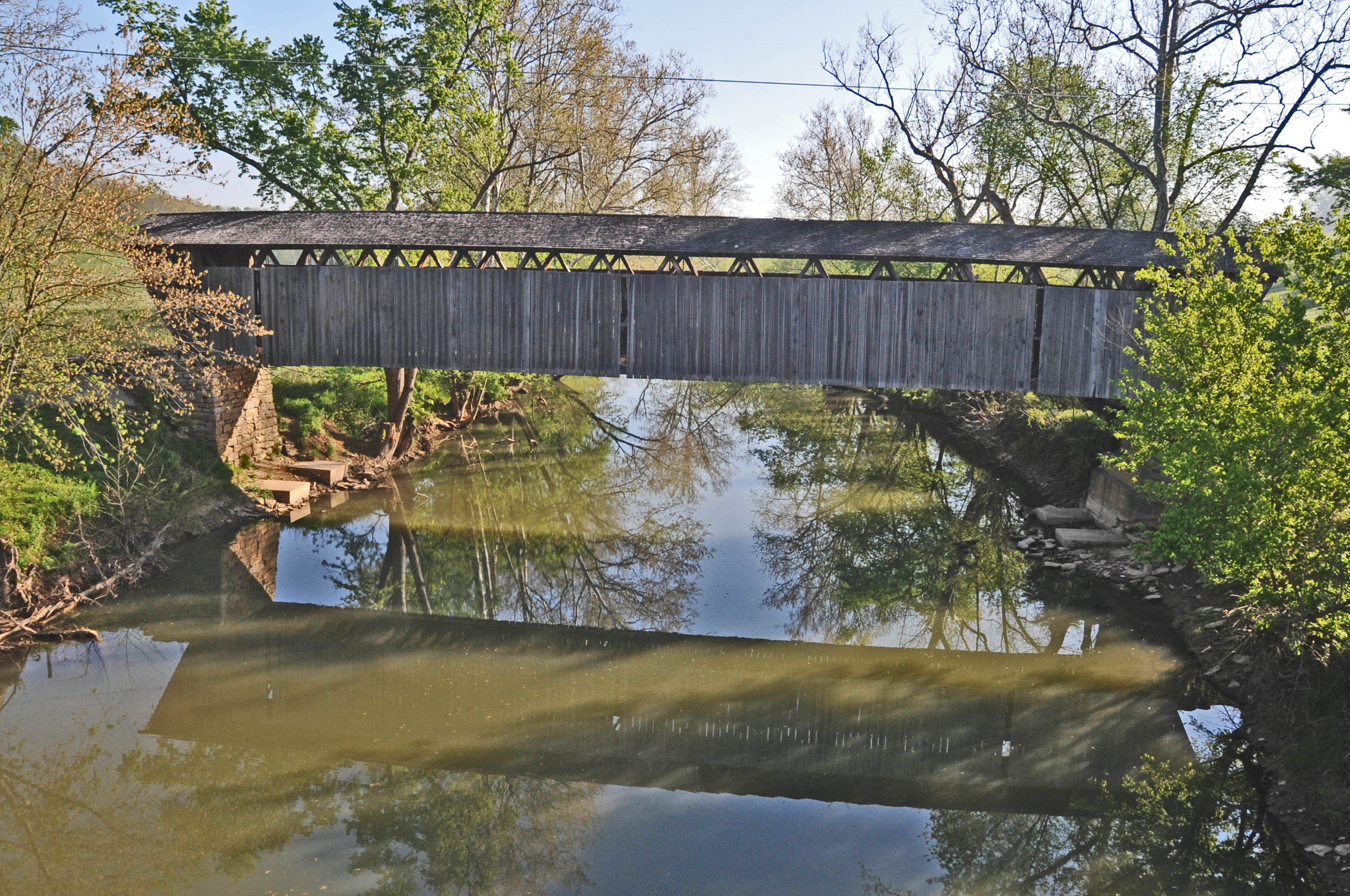

- Location within Kentucky Location within the United States
- Location: Off Rocky Branch Rd., over North Elkhorn Creek, Switzer, Kentucky
- Coordinates: 38°15′14″N 84°45′08″W
- Area: 1 acre (0.40 ha)
- Built: c.1855
- Built by: Hockensmith, George
- NRHP reference No.: 74000875
- Added to NRHP: September 6, 1974

The Switzer Covered Bridge, located off Rocky Branch Rd., over North Elkhorn Creek, in or near Switzer, Kentucky, was built around 1855. It was listed on the National Register of Historic Places in 1974.

It is 126 feet (38 m) long and 11 feet (3.4 m) wide. It was built by George Hockensmith.

The bridge was threatened with destruction in 1953, but was saved. In March 1997, it was knocked from its foundation by high water and was later rebuilt again that year Instead of destroying and replacing this bridge.
