= Johnson Creek Covered Bridge =

- U.S. National Register of Historic Places
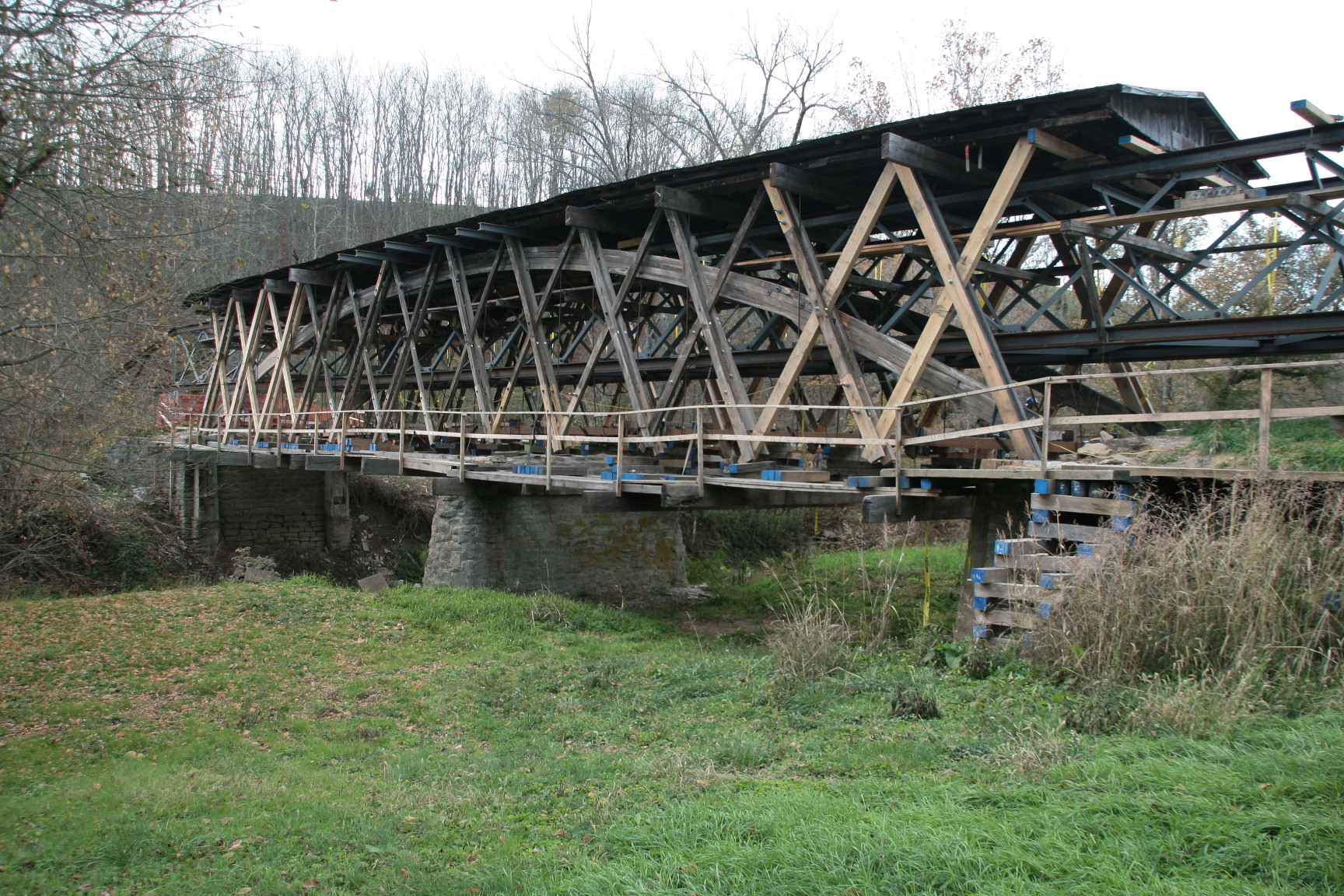
- Under renovation in 2007

- Location within Kentucky Location within the United States
- Location: Covered Bridge Rd., off Kentucky Route 1029 (Old Blue Lick Rd.)
- Coordinates: 38.48190°N 83.97826°W
- Built: 1874
- Architectural style: Smith "Type 3" truss
- NRHP reference No.: 76000941
- Added to NRHP: September 27, 1976

The Johnson Creek Covered Bridge is located four miles north of Blue Licks Battlefield State Park in Robertson County and is currently closed to vehicular traffic. The bridge is important as the only known example of Robert Smith's truss system in Kentucky and the only covered bridge extant known to have been built by Jacob N. Bower (1819–1906).

The bridge was constructed in 1874 and was one of thirteen that remained, now eleven, of more than four hundred covered bridges in Kentucky. Around 1912, Jacob Bower's son, Louis, added an arch on each side to support increased traffic using the bridge. The bridge is 114 feet long and 16 feet wide, according to Louis Bower, grandson of Jacob Bower and a local covered bridge builder.

Later generations have advanced numerous reasons for the construction of covered bridges, but the historical reason for their existence was the maintenance of structural integrity. The cover allowed timbered trusses and braces to season properly and kept water out of the joints, prolonging their lives by seven to eight times that of an uncovered bridge.

It is located on what is now a bypass named Covered Bridge Rd., off Kentucky Route 1029 (Old Blue Lick Rd.), about 6.4 miles southeast of Mt. Olivet, Kentucky by road and about 4.0 miles north of Blue Licks Battlefield State Park. It crosses Johnson Creek, a tributary to the Licking River.
