= Yatesville Covered Bridge =

- U.S. National Register of Historic Places
- Location within Kentucky Location within the United States
- Location: Over Blaine Creek off Kentucky Route 3, south of Fallsburg, Kentucky
- Coordinates: 38°08′41″N 82°41′05″W
- Area: 2 acres (0.81 ha)
- Built: 1907
- Architectural style: Howe Truss
- NRHP reference No.: 76000910
- Added to NRHP: March 26, 1976

The Yatesville Covered Bridge, in Lawrence County, Kentucky near Fallsburg, was built in 1907 and was listed on the National Register of Historic Places in 1976.

It was a 128 feet (39 m) single-span Howe truss bridge over Blaine Creek, located about 1,000 yards (0.91 km) off Yatesville Road, near the Kentucky border. It had board-and-batten siding open at the top under the eaves of the structure, and a corrugated tin roof.

As of the NRHP listing in 1976, there was a "pulleyed steel sedan" about 25 yards (23 m) to the south, and the bridge was closed to vehicular traffic. While there were other beliefs about its function, the cable car system was in fact for U.S. Geological Survey measurement of flow rates of the creek.

The bridge no longer exists.

It was the last-surviving of three known covered bridges in Lawrence County, and was saved from demolition in 1965 by a letter-writing campaign. It was bypassed, repaired, and painted red. However, in May 1986 the bridge collapsed and its remains were removed by the county.
