= Anderson Brothers Department Store =

- U.S. National Register of Historic Places
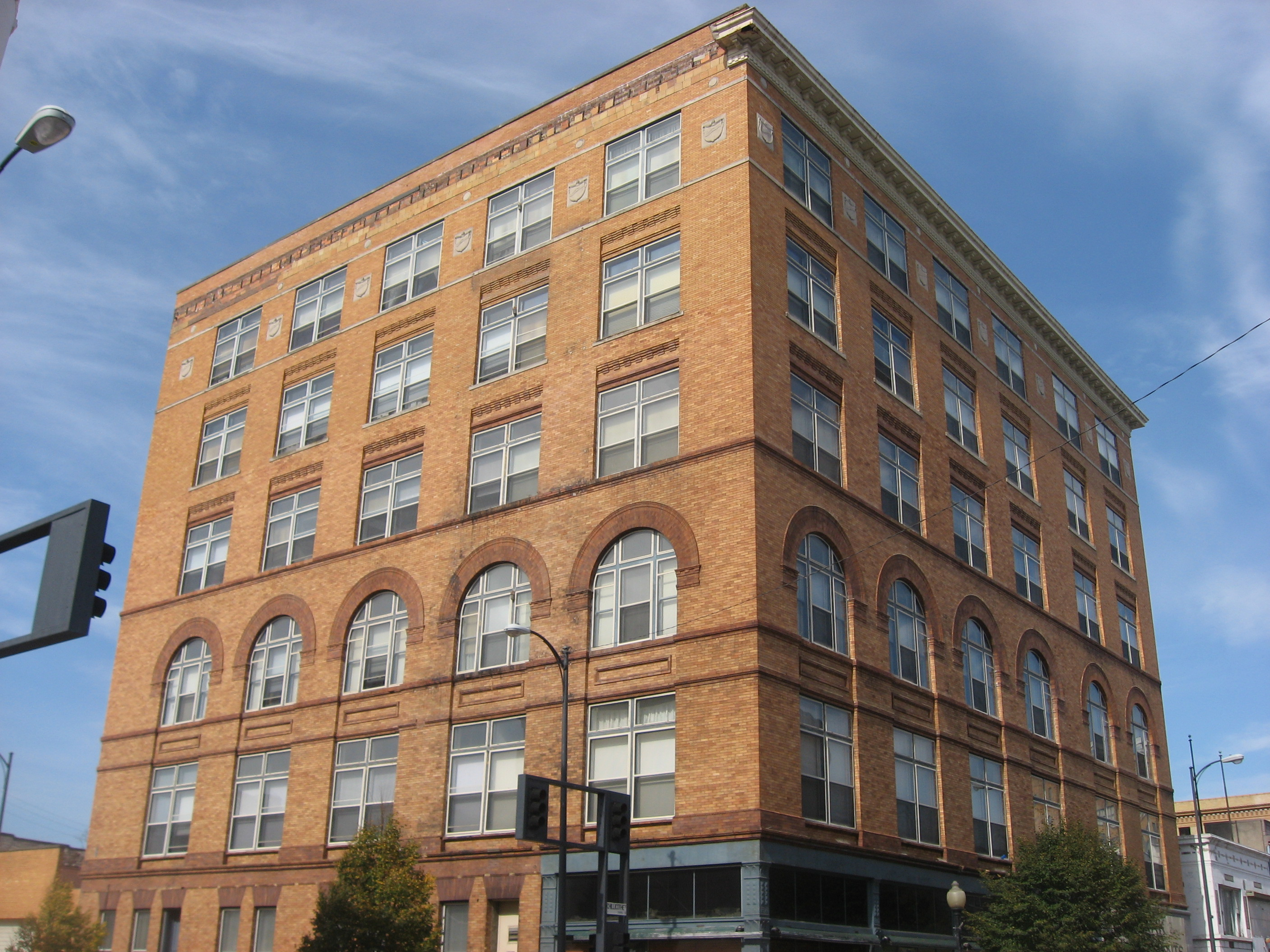
- View from the southeast

- Location within Ohio Location within the United States
- Location: 301-307 Chillicothe St., Portsmouth, Ohio
- Coordinates: 38°43′56″N 82°59′49″W
- Area: Less than 1 acre (0.40 ha)
- Built: 1899
- Architectural style: Renaissance
- MPS: Boneyfiddle MRA
- NRHP reference No.: 01000052
- Added to NRHP: February 2, 2001

Anderson Brothers Department Store is a registered historic building in Portsmouth, Ohio, listed in the National Register on 2001-02-02.

== Historic uses ==
- Specialty Store

== See also ==
- Sears, Roebuck and Company
