= St. Mary of the Annunciation Catholic Church (Portsmouth, Ohio) =

Historic church in Ohio, United States

- St. Mary's Roman Catholic Church
- U.S. National Register of Historic Places
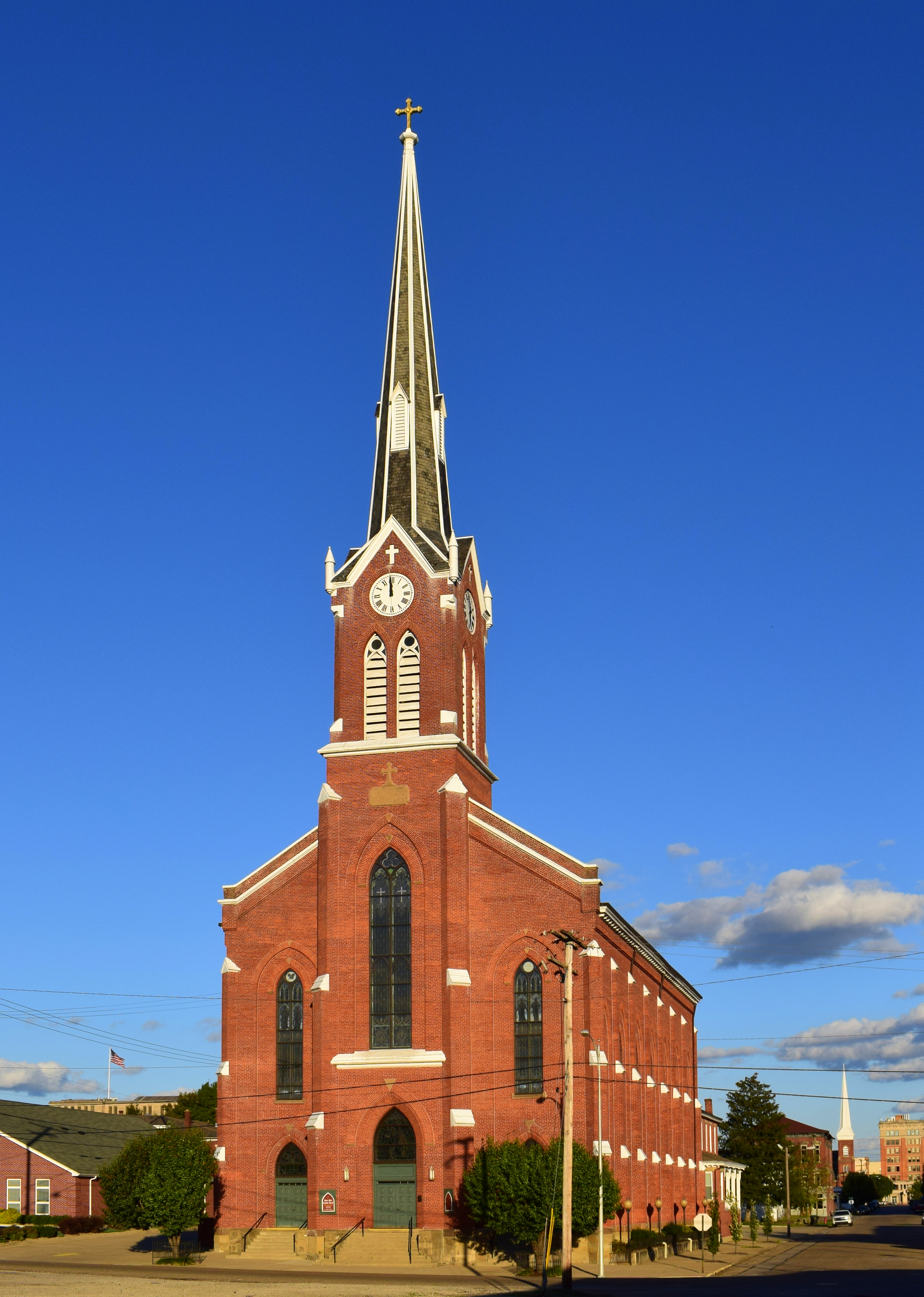

- Location within Ohio Location within the United States
- Location: 5th and Markets Sts, Portsmouth, Ohio
- Coordinates: 38°44′3″N 83°0′8″W
- Area: less than one acre
- Built: 1870
- Architectural style: Germanic Gothic Revival
- NRHP reference No.: 79001940
- Added to NRHP: August 24, 1979

St. Mary of the Annunciation Roman Catholic Church is a historic church of the Roman Catholic Diocese of Columbus in Portsmouth, Ohio. It was built in 1870 and added to the National Register of Historic Places in 1979.

== History ==
The first Church of the Annunciation of Portsmouth was built in 1844 by Father O. Mealy, on Madison and 3rd Street. However, by 1852, the Catholics of the community needed another parish, and the German Catholics of the area retained the Church of the Annunciation, under the leadership of Father Francis Karge. The German community grew such that plans were made to construct a new church. A lot on the corner of Fifth and Market was purchased for $2500 in 1859 and the foundation of the church was built in 1864, in addition to a large schoolhouse, costing $3000. The cornerstone of the current church was blessed by Bishop Sylvester Rosecrans on May 9, 1869. The building was dedicated under the name of "Annunciation" on July 31, 1870, having cost $70,000 and having a capacity to seat around 800 people. In 1877, a large pipe organ was added, and in 1895, a bell tower and chimes were installed.

The church was greatly damaged by the Ohio River flood of 1937, with water reaching 10 feet high in the church and causing more than $20,000 in damage.

St. Mary is a member of the Diocese of Columbus, under the care of Bishop Earl K. Fernandes, Bishop of Columbus, with the Rev. Stephen Smith as pastor.

As of July 1, 2024, St. Mary is a member of the St. John Paul II Scioto Catholic Parish along with Holy Redeemer (Portsmouth), Holy Trinity (Pond Creek, West Portsmouth), and Saint Peter in Chains (Wheelersburg) churches.
