= Cabin Creek Covered Bridge =

- U.S. National Register of Historic Places
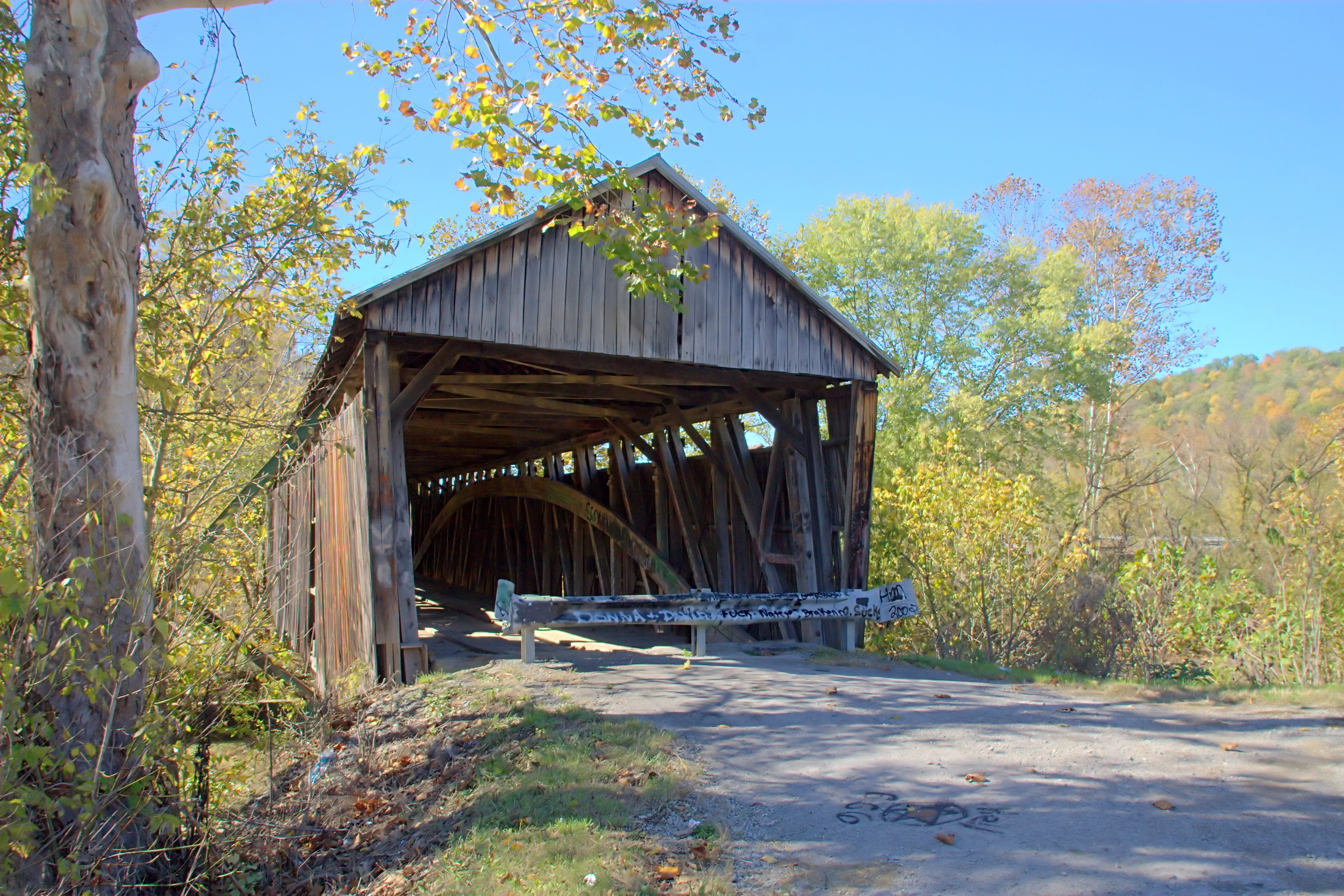
- Cabin Creek Covered Bridge

- Location within Kentucky Location within the United States
- Location: Kentucky Highway 984 4.5 miles northwest of Tollesboro, Kentucky
- Coordinates: 38°37′13″N 83°37′16″W
- Built: c. 1867
- Architectural style: Burr Truss
- NRHP reference No.: 76000912
- Added to NRHP: March 26, 1976

Spanning 114 feet (35 m), the Cabin Creek Covered Bridge crosses Cabin Creek 4.5 miles (7.2 km) northwest of Tollesboro on Kentucky Highway 984 about 12.4 miles from the Lewis-Fleming County line. It is no longer open to vehicular traffic.

The bridge was constructed in 1867 and is one of thirteen remaining in the state. The lack of siding under the eaves creates a clerestory effect along the entire length. Around 1914, Louis Bower reinforced the Burr truss structure by adding an arch on either side, requiring the addition of skew backs where the arch meets the abutments.

A number of reasons have been offered to explain the construction of covered bridges in Kentucky during the 19th century. The protection the cover provided against wood deterioration was likely most important. The cover allowed timbered trusses and braces to season properly and kept water out of the joints, prolonging the life by seven to eight times that of an uncovered bridge.

Numerous dates have been listed over several decades for the construction of the Cabin Creek Bridge. Fiscal Court records quoted by Rev. O. G Ragan in his History of Lewis County, Kentucky. Press of Jennings and Graham, 1912, list 1869 as the date of charter of the Cabin Creek Turnpike; 1870 as the date in which the turnpike company was authorized to cross Cabin Creek "at William Henderson's;" and 1871 as the date of construction of the bridge. The circa 1914 Bower reconstruction has been confirmed through announcement in the Maysville Evening Bulletin to have begun in September, 1907.

The builder of the Cabin Creek Bridge was generally and officially stated as unknown for decades. In recent years it has been attributed to both Jacob Bower and to William Henderson - then owner of adjacent property. The assertion that Henderson constructed the bridge is based upon a letter written in the 1970s to the Vanceburg newspaper disputing a statement made in an article that the bridge was constructed by Mackey Hughes. The author of the letter was Ms. Birdie Henderson, great-great-granddaughter of William Henderson.It has been handed down through several generations of the Henderson family that Mr. Henderson was the builder of the bridge. From Fiscal Court records transcribed in Ragan, the builder of the bridge was "a Mr. Bryant of Ohio." "Mr. Bryant" was in all likelihood Josiah Bryant, a noted covered bridge builder from Mt. Orab, Brown County, Ohio. The structural and empirical details of several Ohio covered bridges confirmed to have been built by Bryant validate this contemporaneous documentation.

Cabin Creek was closed to vehicular traffic in 1983 and was restored by Arnold M. Graton Associates of Ashland, New Hampshire, 2012–2014.
