= Colville Covered Bridge =

- U.S. National Register of Historic Places
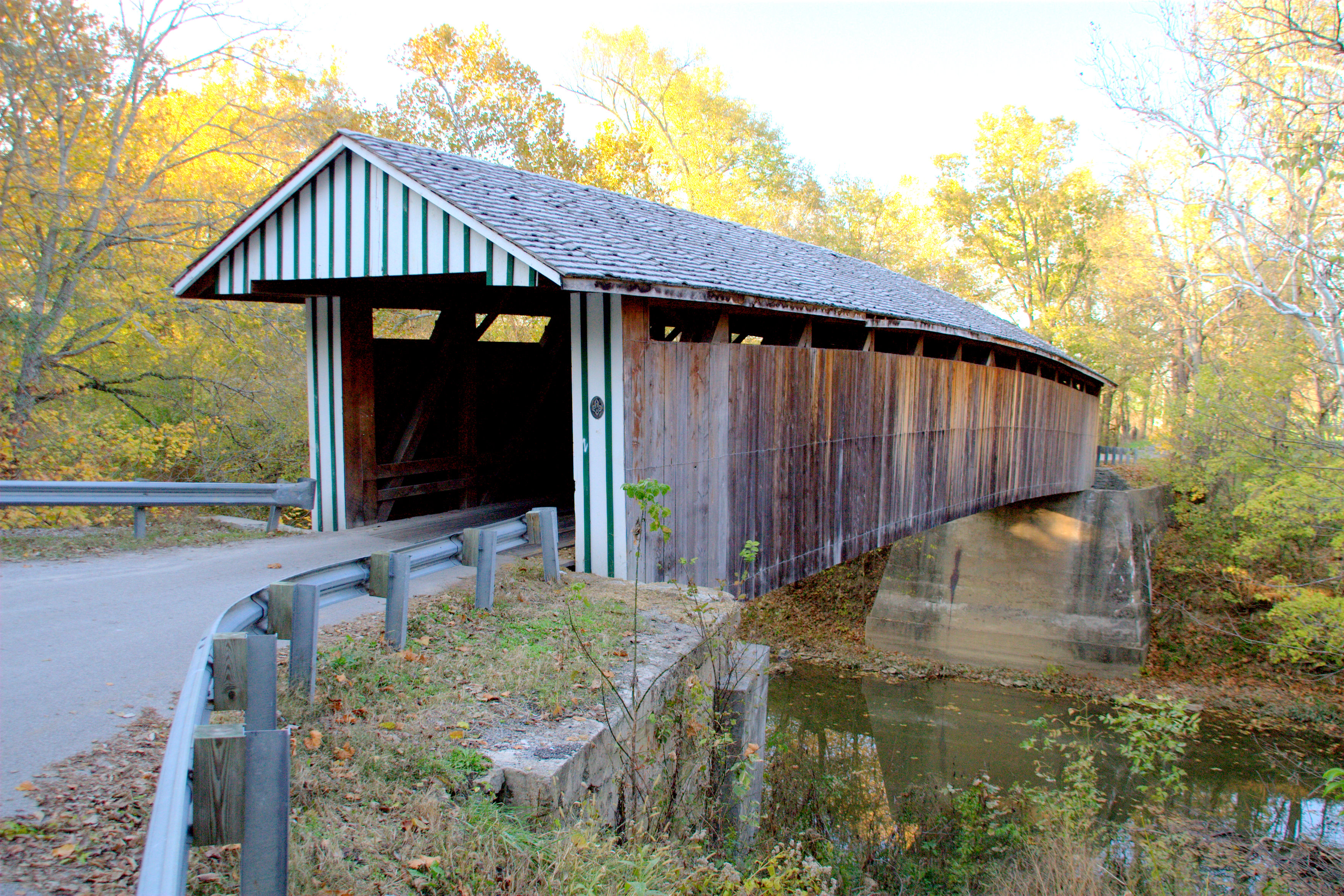
- Colville Covered Bridge

- Location within Kentucky Location within the United States
- Location: Hinkston Creek - four miles northwest of Millersburg, Kentucky
- Coordinates: 38°19′28″N 84°12′12″W
- Built: Early 19th century
- Architectural style: Burr Truss
- NRHP reference No.: 74000850
- Added to NRHP: December 30, 1974

Spanning 124 feet (38 m), the 18 feet (5.5 m) wide Colville Covered Bridge is located along the Colville Pike where it crosses Hinkston Creek about four miles northwest of Millersburg, Kentucky. The bridge is situated 28 feet (8.5 m) above the water level in a rural area where vehicular traffic mainly comprises local residents and farm vehicles.

The bridge was constructed in 1877 and is one of 13 that remain of more than 400 covered bridges in Kentucky. The construction architecture is Burr truss consisting of multiple king-posts with panel posts generally spaced 10 feet apart.

A number of reasons have been offered to explain the construction of covered bridges in Kentucky during the 19th century. The protection the cover provided against wood deterioration was likely most important. The yellow poplar used in the construction was thought - at the time - to be almost indestructible when shielded from the weather. The cover allowed timbered trusses and braces to season properly and kept water out of the joints, prolonging the life by seven to eight times that of an uncovered bridge. A second plausible reason is that the boarded sides and shingled roofs prevented horses from seeing the drop to the water below and becoming "spooked". "
