= Walcott Covered Bridge =

- U.S. National Register of Historic Places
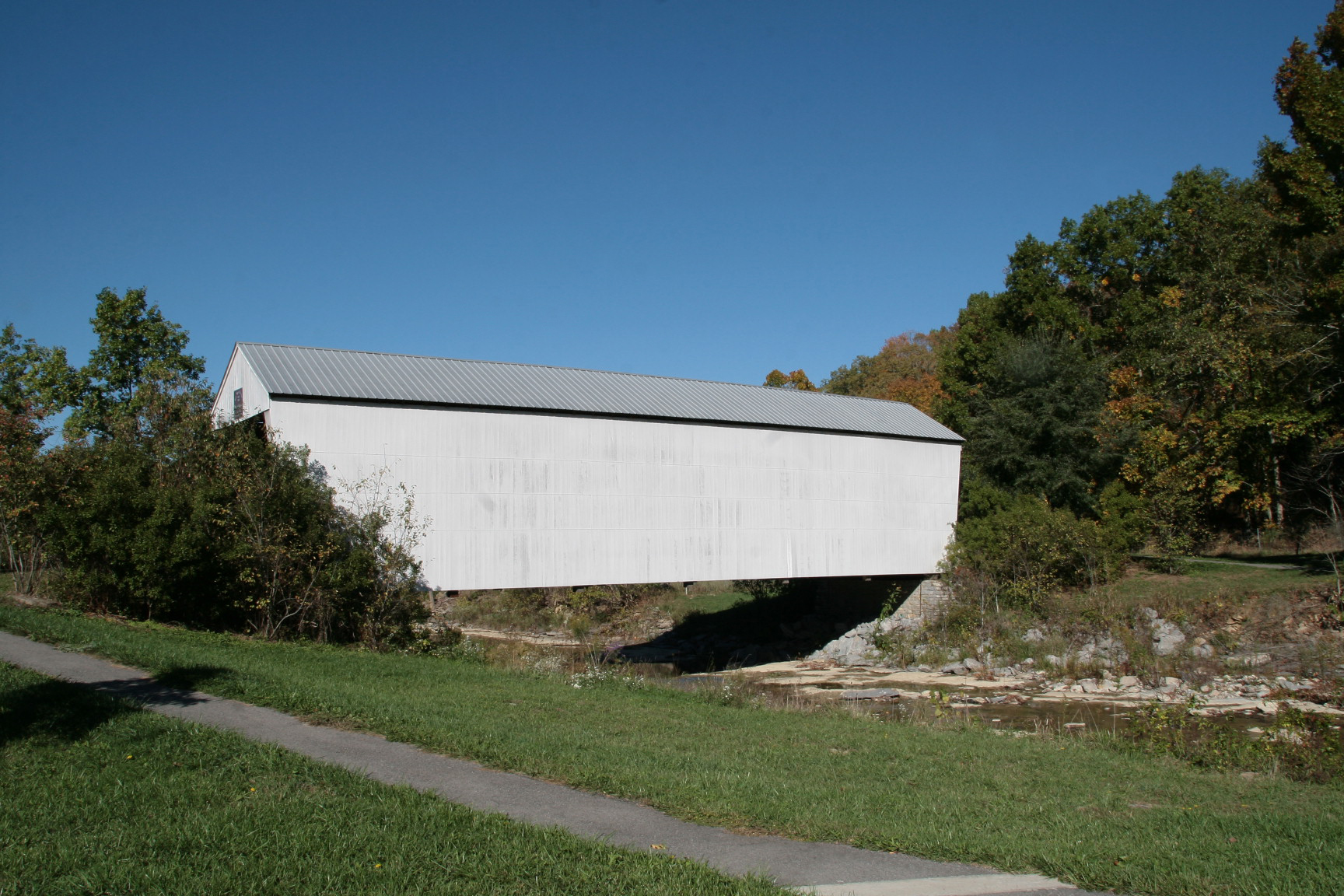
- Walcott Covered Bridge

- Location within Kentucky Location within the United States
- Location: 3.5 miles north of Brooksville, Kentucky on Ky 1159
- Coordinates: 38°44′00″N 84°6′2″W
- Built: 1824
- Architectural style: Combination King post and Queen post design
- NRHP reference No.: 75000738
- Added to NRHP: June 10, 1975

The Walcott Covered Bridge is situated at a point where Kentucky Highway 1159 used to cross Locust Creek in Bracken County, Kentucky. A concrete bridge was constructed in 1954, about 200 feet northwest of the covered bridge and the older structure was then bypassed by highway traffic. The bridge was severely damaged by floods in 1997 and 1998 and engineers determined a location about 400 feet east of the original site would be better for the bridge's chances of survival. The bridge was reconstructed in 2002.

The bridge construction is a combination of Queen post and King post type truss. The sides are completely enclosed and the exterior is painted white. It is 75 feet in length, has a horizontal clearance of 14 feet, and a vertical clearance of 13 feet and six inches. The bridge is built of poplar and rests atop two stone abutments.

There are a number of explanations for covered bridge construction. Most consider that the boarded sides and shingled roof protected the bridge floor and sub-structure from deterioration. It is also said that horses crossed covered bridges more easily without being able to see the streams underneath them.
