= Bennett's Mill Covered Bridge =

- U.S. National Register of Historic Places
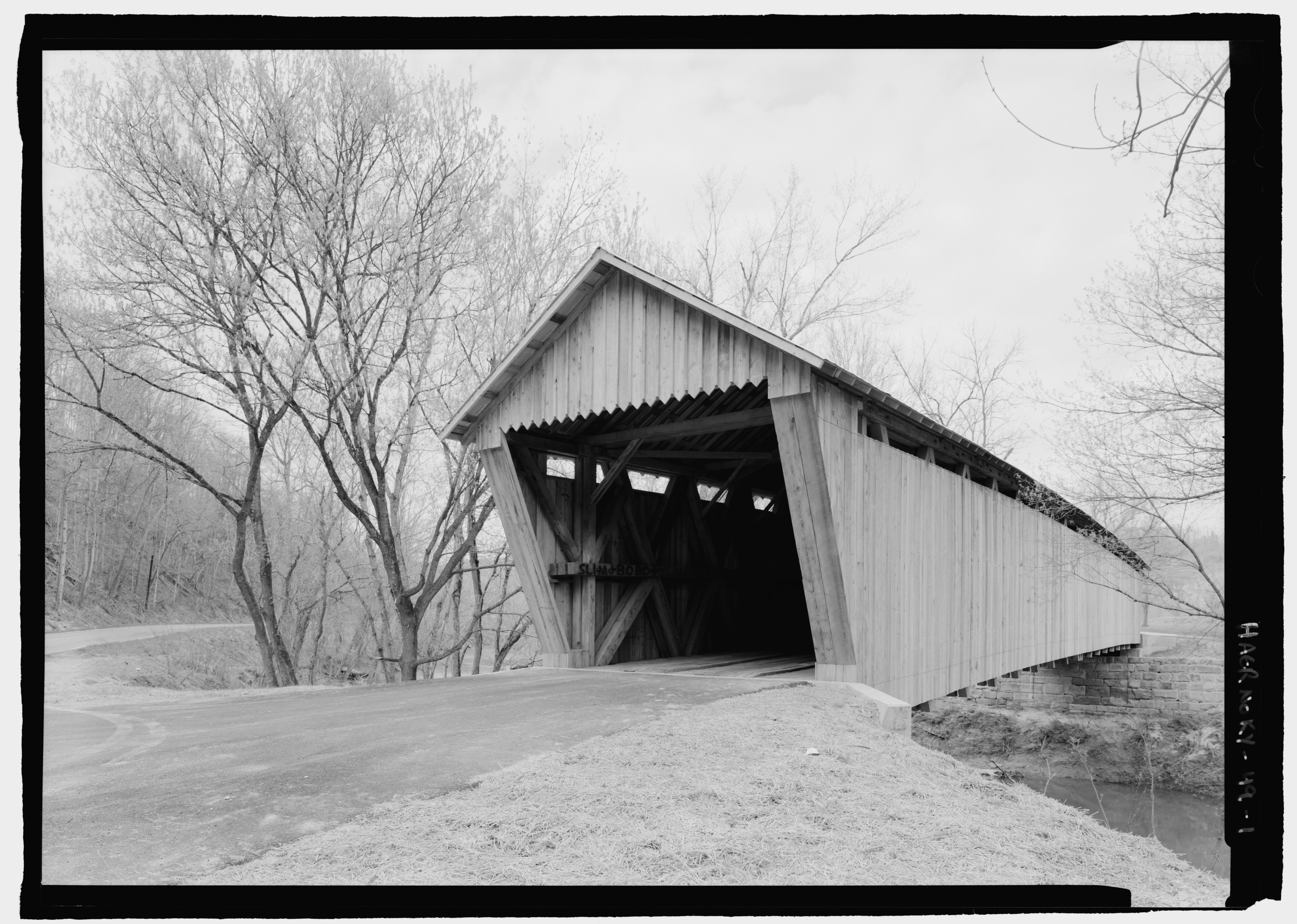

- Location within Kentucky Location within the United States
- Nearest city: Greenup, Kentucky
- Coordinates: 38°37′50″N 82°55′37″W
- Area: 2 acres (0.81 ha)
- Built: 1855
- NRHP reference No.: 76000892
- Added to NRHP: March 26, 1976

Bennett's Mill Covered Bridge, near Greenup, Kentucky, was built in 1855. It was listed on the National Register of Historic Places in 1976.

The bridge carries Brown Covered Bridge Road (County Route 2125) over Tygarts Creek, west of Greenup.

It was defended by two hidden cannons during the American Civil War.

At 195 feet (59 m) long, it is the longest single-span covered bridge in Kentucky.

== See also ==
- Oldtown Covered Bridge: also in Greenup County, Kentucky
- List of bridges documented by the Historic American Engineering Record in Kentucky
- National Register of Historic Places listings in Greenup County, Kentucky
