= Evangelical Church of Christ (Portsmouth, Ohio) =

Historic church in Ohio, United States

- U.S. National Register of Historic Places
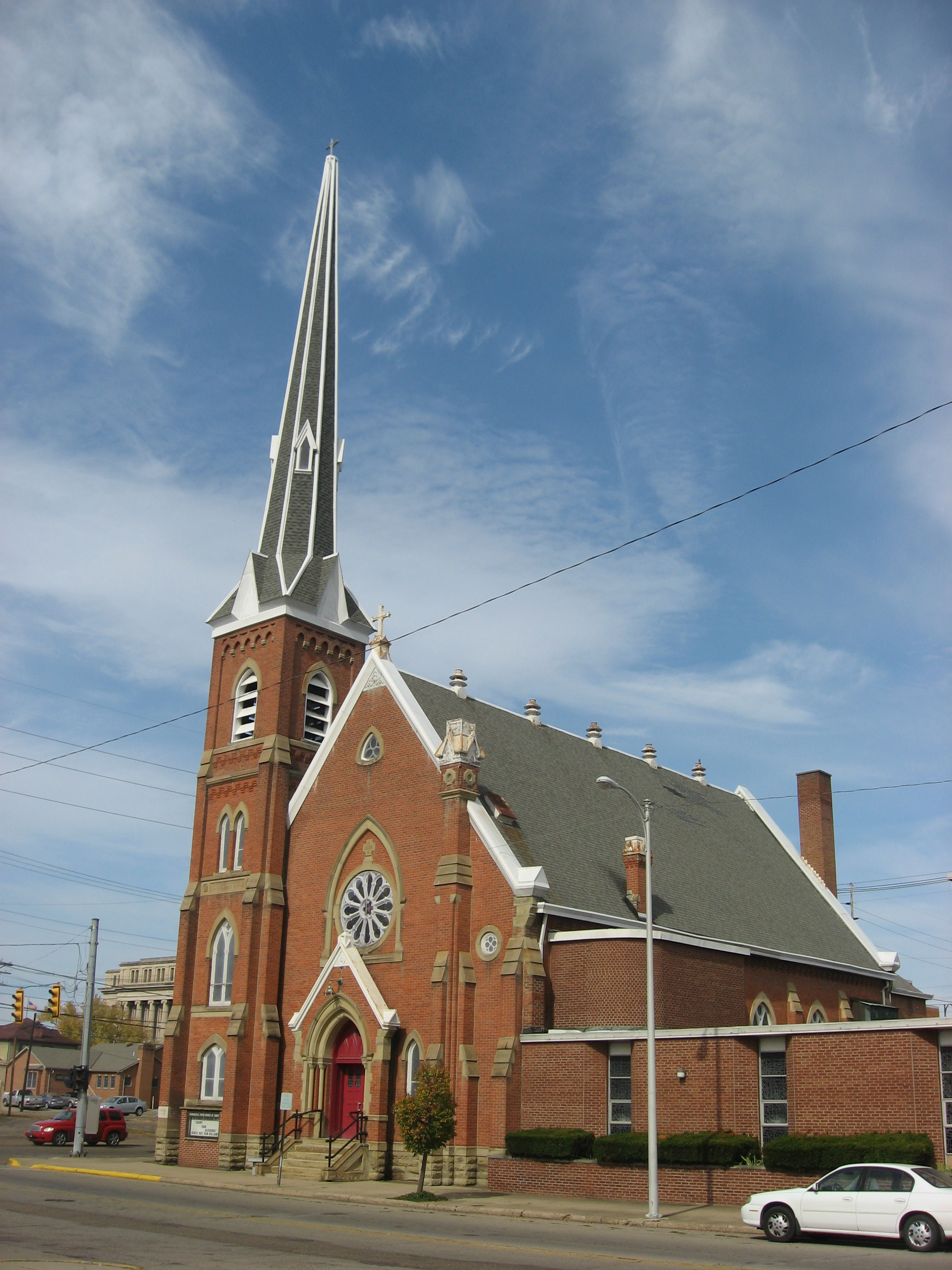
- Front and eastern side

- Location within Ohio Location within the United States
- Location: 701 Fifth St., Portsmouth, Ohio
- Coordinates: 38°44′3″N 82°59′54″W
- Area: Less than 1 acre (0.40 ha)
- Built: 1886
- Architect: Captain Alger
- Architectural style: German Gothic
- MPS: Boneyfiddle MRA
- NRHP reference No.: 87002077
- Added to NRHP: December 8, 1987

Evangelical Church of Christ (German United Evangelical Church) is a historic church at 701 Fifth Street in Portsmouth, Ohio.

It was built in 1886 and added to the National Register in 1987.

On January 11, 2020, strong winds knocked over the church's steeple causing damage to its roof.
