= Valley Pike Covered Bridge =

- U.S. National Register of Historic Places
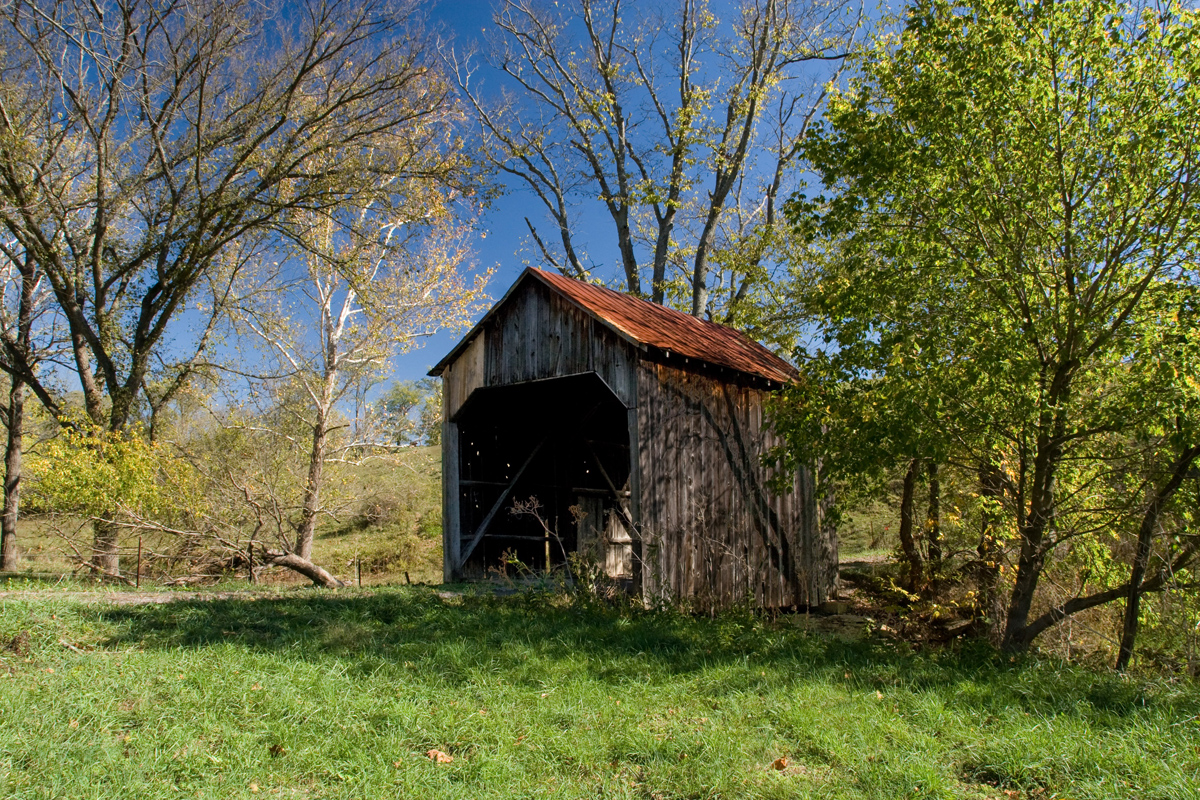

- Location within Kentucky Location within the United States
- Location: On Valley Pike, approximately 1.5 miles from intersection with Kentucky Route 10
- Coordinates: 38°40′27″N 83°52′20″W
- Built: Unknown
- Architectural style: Single kingpost
- NRHP reference No.: 76000924
- Added to NRHP: March 26, 1976

The Valley Pike Covered Bridge was a historic covered bridge located in Mason County, Kentucky, United States. It crossed the Frasure Branch of Lee Creek. It was added to the National Register of Historic Places in 1976. The bridge was dismantled after flood damage on April 27, 2018.

The bridge construction was single kingpost, resting on stone abutments. The span was short – 30 to 35 feet – consistent with the single kingpost system. The structure had tin siding and roofing. It was the only privately owned covered bridge in Kentucky and had provided access to farmland.

A number of reasons have been offered to explain the construction of covered bridges in Kentucky during the 19th century. Roads across the bridges were kept dry and free of snow in winter. The protection the cover provided against wood deterioration was likely most important. The cover allowed timbered trusses and braces to season properly and kept water out of the joints, prolonging the life by seven to eight times that of an uncovered bridge.

== See also ==
- Lee's Creek Covered Bridge: also crosses Lee's Creek in Mason County
- National Register of Historic Places listings in Mason County, Kentucky
