= Lee's Creek Covered Bridge =

- U.S. National Register of Historic Places
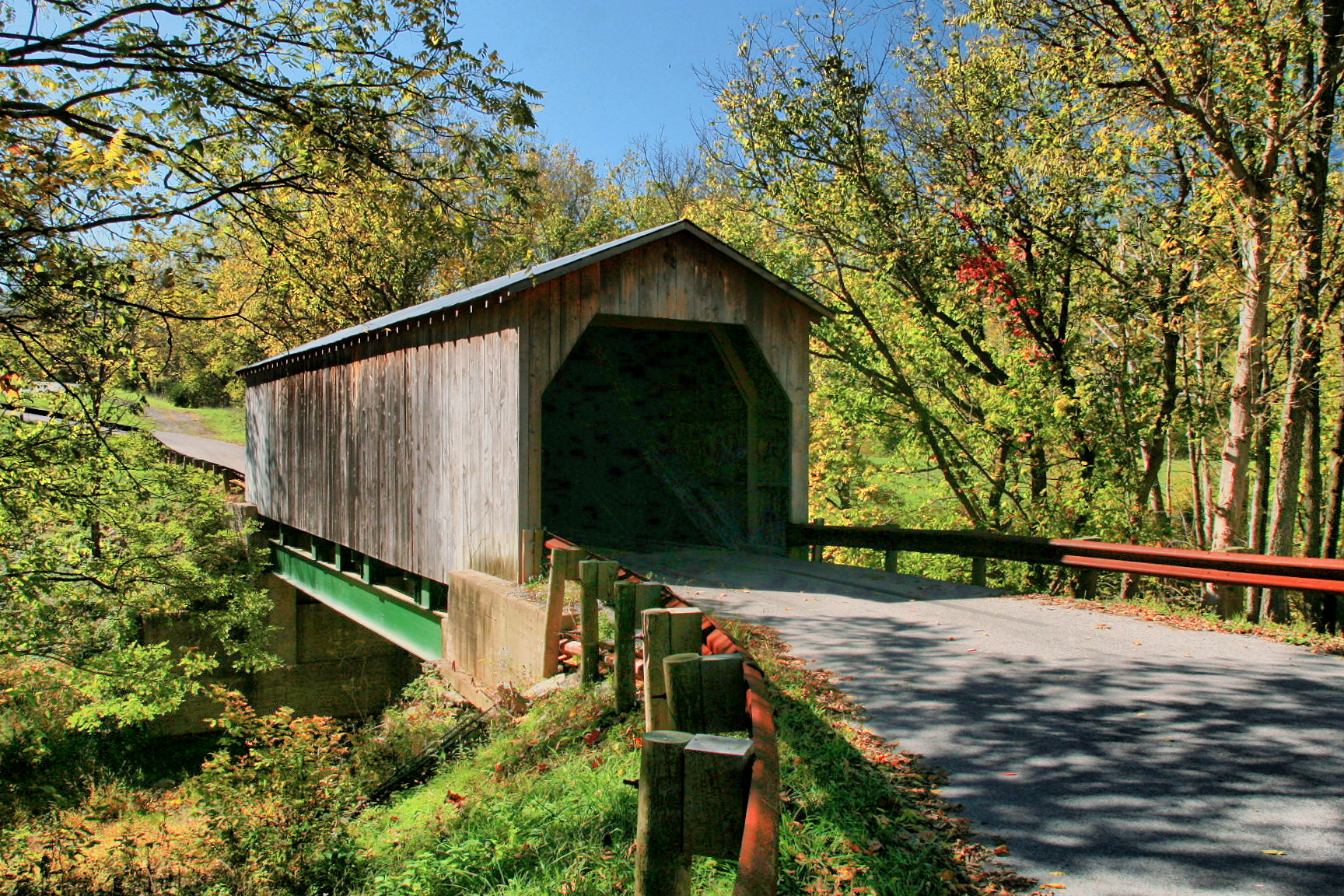
- Lee's Creek Bridge near Dover, KY

- Location within Ohio
- Location: On Lees Creek Road (SSR 3313) over Lees Creek, approximately 0.1 miles south of SR 8 Dover, Kentucky
- Coordinates: 38.749722°N 83.878889°W
- Built: 1835
- Architectural style: Double queenpost arches
- NRHP reference No.: 76000923
- Added to NRHP: March 26, 1976

Lee's Creek Covered Bridge is a historic wooden bridge on Lee's Creek Road 0.1 miles (0.16 km) south of Kentucky Route 8 near Dover, Kentucky. It is 61 feet (19 m) long with a double set of Queen post trusses on each side.

It was built in 1835 as a toll bridge and added to the National Register of Historic Places in 1976. Major renovations were completed in 1926 by the Bower Bridge Company and in 1966 by the Kentucky Highway Department. It was raised to the current height by 15-year-old Stock Bower in 1920. The latest renovation took place in 2001. Iron support beams were added to the bridge during the course of these renovations.

Many reasons have been offered to explain the construction of covered bridges in Kentucky during the 19th century. Roads across the bridges were kept dry and free of snow in winter. The protection the cover provided against wood deterioration was likely most important. The cover allowed timbered trusses and braces to season properly and kept water out of the joints, prolonging the life by seven to eight times that of an uncovered bridge.

The bridge was bypassed in 2005, but remains open to local traffic.

== See also ==
- Valley Pike Covered Bridge: also crossed Lee's Creek in Mason County
- National Register of Historic Places listings in Mason County, Kentucky
