= Ringos Mill Covered Bridge =

- U.S. National Register of Historic Places
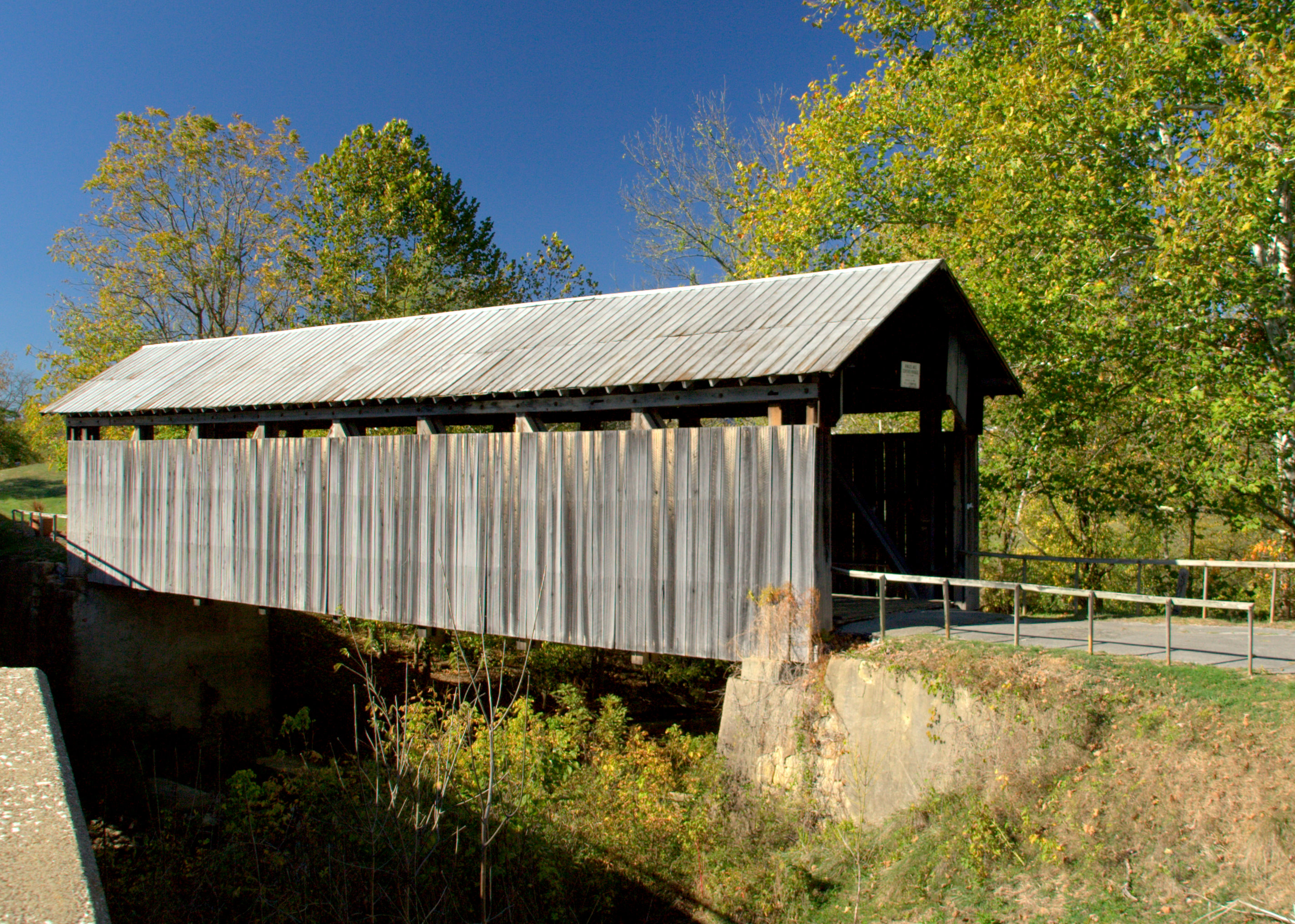
- Ringos Mill Covered Bridge

- Location within Kentucky Location within the United States
- Location: 13.7 miles south of Flemingsburg, Kentucky on Ky 158
- Coordinates: 38°16′06″N 83°36′38″W
- Built: 1867
- Architectural style: Burr truss
- NRHP reference No.: 76000880
- Added to NRHP: March 26, 1976

The Ringos Mill Covered Bridge spans Fox Creek in Fleming County, Kentucky, in a single 90-foot span. It was named for a grist mill situated 50 yards downstream.

The bridge's timbers are of yellow pine. It was probably built by the same contractor who constructed Hillsboro Covered Bridge several miles down Fox Creek. Abutments are of red stone covered with a concrete facing and the walls are double-sided with yellow poplar. Ventilation and light are provided by clerestory openings in the siding. The bridge is a good example of Theodore Burr's 1814 patented truss design that employs multiple kingposts. Patent bridges were the "bread and butter" of early engineers, who typically received one dollar per linear foot of bridge construction for the use of the patented design.

== See also ==
- Goddard Covered Bridge: crosses the Sand Lick Creek in Fleming County, Kentucky
- Hillsboro Covered Bridge: also crosses the Fox Creek in Fleming County, Kentucky
