= Hillsboro Covered Bridge =

- U.S. National Register of Historic Places
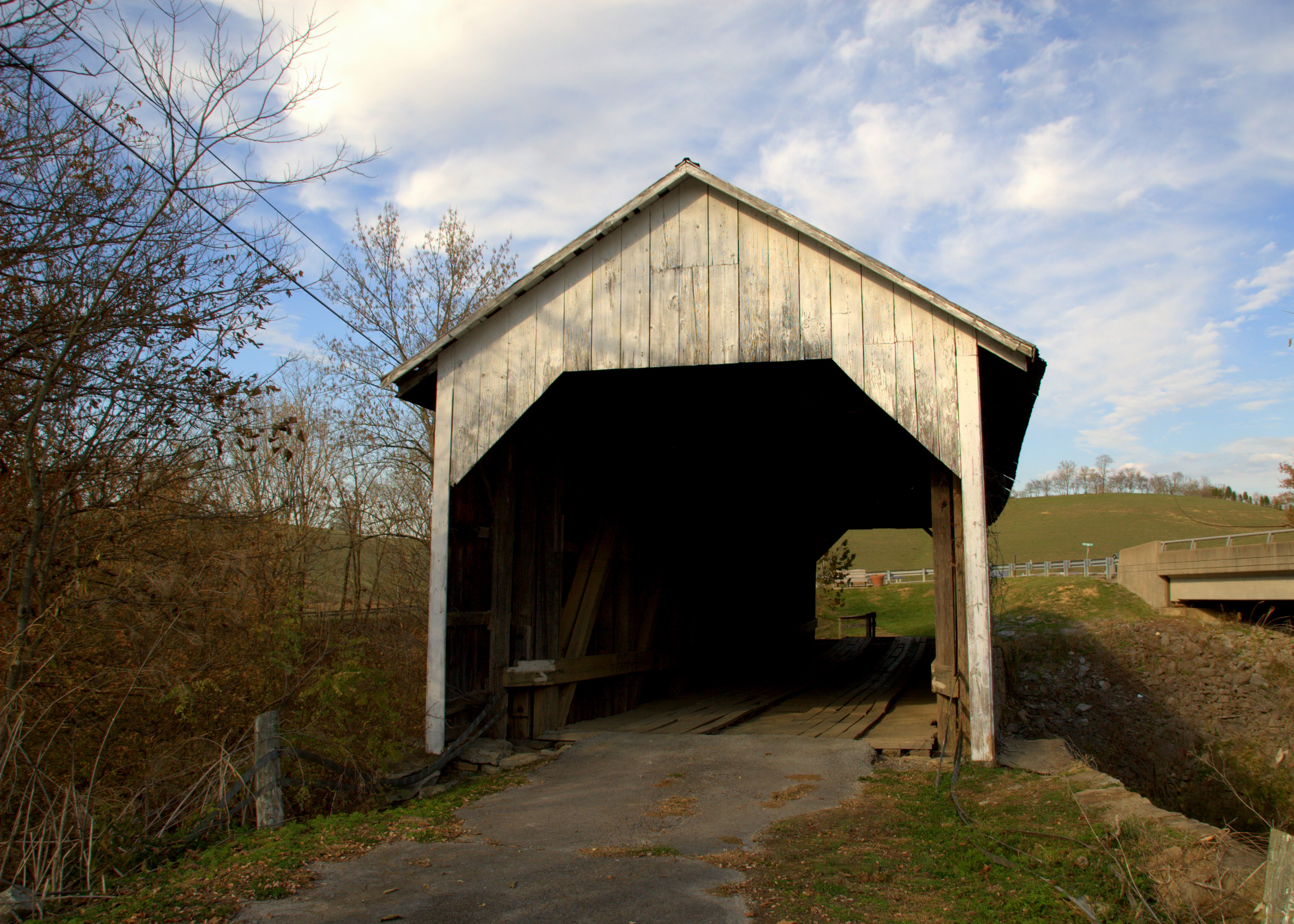
- Hillsboro Covered Bridge

- Location within Kentucky Location within the United States
- Location: Route 32 at Goddard, Fleming County, Kentucky
- Coordinates: 38°15′17″N 83°39′11″W
- Built: Circa 1865-1870
- Architectural style: Burr truss
- NRHP reference No.: 76000881
- Added to NRHP: March 26, 1976

The Hillsboro Covered Bridge, known locally as the "Hillsboro-Grange City Covered Bridge", spans Fox Creek in Fleming County adjacent to Kentucky Route 111, 13.6 miles (21.9 km) southeast of Flemingsburg, Kentucky. Probably built in the late 1860s, it was discontinued in 1968 when it was replaced fifty yards (46 m) upstream by a concrete bridge.

The bridge's timbers are of yellow pine with double shouldered braces. A single 94-foot (29 m) span, it was probably built by the same contractor who constructed Ringos Mill Covered Bridge several miles up Fox Creek. Abutments are of red stone and corrugated sheet metal covers the roof and sides. The bridge was originally double-sided with yellow poplar. The bridge is a good example of Theodore Burr's 1814 patented truss design that employs multiple kingposts. Patent bridges were the "bread and butter" of early engineers who typically received one dollar per linear foot of bridge construction for use of the patented design.

== See also ==
- Goddard Covered Bridge: crosses the Sand Lick Creek in Fleming County, Kentucky
- Ringos Mill Covered Bridge: also crosses the Fox Creek in Fleming County, Kentucky
