= Goddard Bridge =

- U.S. National Register of Historic Places
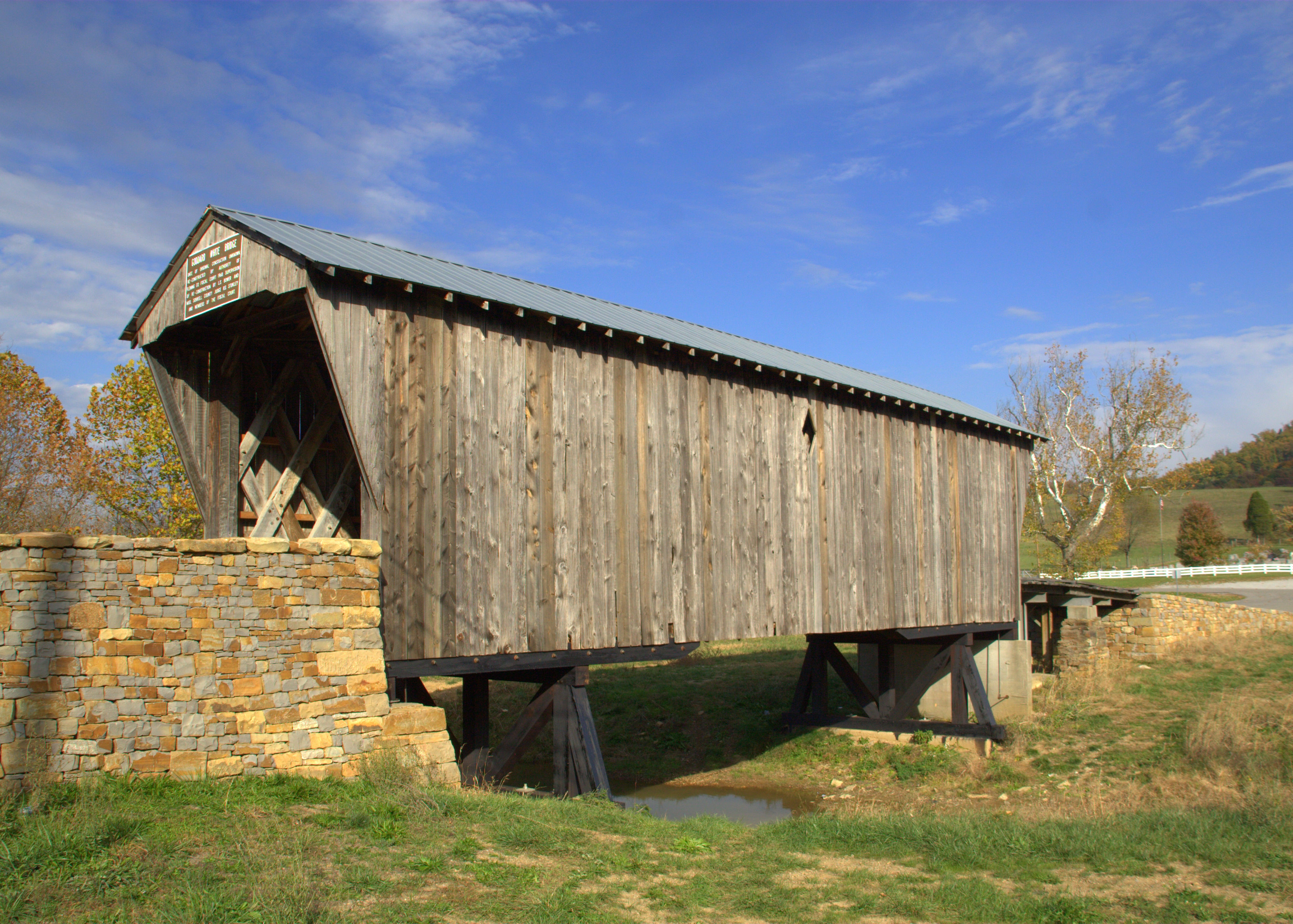
- Goddard Bridge

- Location within Kentucky Location within the United States
- Location: Route 32 at Goddard, Fleming County, Kentucky
- Coordinates: 38°21′44″N 83°36′56″W
- Built: Early 19th century
- Architect: Joseph Goddard
- Architectural style: Town lattice truss
- NRHP reference No.: 75000756
- Added to NRHP: August 22, 1975

Spanning 63 feet (19 m) the Goddard Bridge crosses the Sand Lick Creek just off Kentucky 32, about 8 miles south of Flemingsburg on Covered Bridge Road in Goddard, Kentucky . The Pea Ridge Mountains and an old country church provide a scenic backdrop.

The actual date of construction is unknown, but it is built on the 1820 lattice design of Ithiel Town. The bridge was built by Joseph Goddard. Originally located about one mile south of Goddard, the bridge was moved to its present location in 1933 when Highway 32 was rebuilt. Steel braces sunk into the creek bank near the abutments provide additional support for the span. The bridge is in regular use and is open to traffic with a gross weight under 4 tons. The bridge was restored in 1968 with the replacement of some lateral bracing, siding, roofing and the wooden pins or trunnels used as fasteners instead of nails.

A number of reasons have been offered to explain the construction of covered bridges in Kentucky during the 19th century. Roads across the bridges were kept dry and free of snow in winter. The protection the cover provided against wood deterioration was likely most important. The cover allowed timbered trusses and braces to season properly and kept water out of the joints, prolonging the life by seven to eight times that of an uncovered bridge.

== See also ==
- Hillsboro Covered Bridge: crosses the Fox Creek in Fleming County, Kentucky
- Ringos Mill Covered Bridge: crosses the Fox Creek in Fleming County, Kentucky
