= Switzer, Kentucky =

Unincorporated community in Kentucky, United States

- Unincorporated community
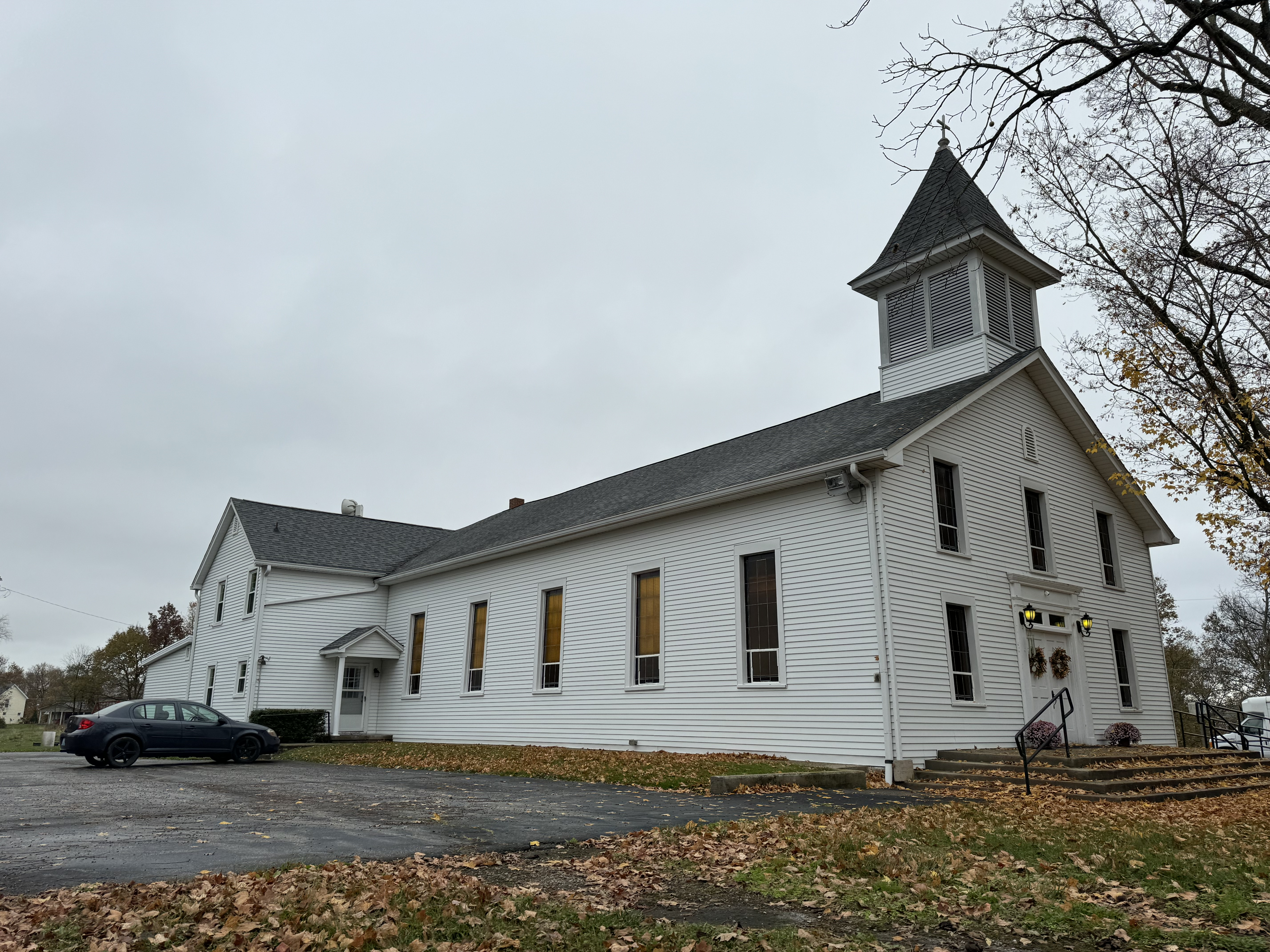
- The historic North Folk Baptist Church, which is a Kentucky State Historic Site.

- Location within the state of Kentucky Switzer (the United States)
- Coordinates: 38°15′15″N 84°45′16″W
- Country: United States
- State: Kentucky
- County: Franklin
- Elevation: 745 ft (227 m)
- Time zone: UTC-5 (Eastern (EST))
  - Summer (DST): UTC-4 (EDT)
- GNIS feature ID: 2369790

Switzer is an unincorporated community within Franklin County, Kentucky, United States. Its post office is closed.
