= Sherburne, Kentucky =

Unincorporated community in Kentucky, United States

- Unincorporated community
- Location within the state of Kentucky
- Coordinates: 38°16′54″N 83°48′10″W
- Country: United States
- State: Kentucky
- County: Fleming
- Elevation: 637 ft (194 m)
- Time zone: UTC-5 (Eastern (EST))
  - Summer (DST): UTC-4 (EDT)
- ZIP code: 41041
- Area code: 606
- GNIS feature ID: 503354

Sherburne is an unincorporated community in Fleming County, Kentucky, in the United States.

== History ==
Sherburne was incorporated in 1847. The post office opened in 1815 under the name Sherburne Mills and was renamed Sherburne in 1879. The Sherburne post office was discontinued in 1958.
