= Goddard, Kentucky =

Unincorporated community in Kentucky, United States

- Unincorporated community
- Location within Kentucky
- Coordinates: 38°21′45″N 83°36′53″W
- Country: United States
- State: Kentucky
- County: Fleming
- Elevation: 709 ft (216 m)
- Time zone: UTC-5 (Eastern (EST))
  - Summer (DST): UTC-4 (EDT)
- Area code: 606
- GNIS feature ID: 512335

Goddard is an unincorporated community in Fleming County, Kentucky, United States. Goddard is located on Kentucky Route 32, 7.7 miles (12.4 km) east-southeast of Flemingsburg. Goddard Bridge, which is listed on the National Register of Historic Places, is located in Goddard.

The post office opened in 1881 as Sandford, but was renamed Goddard in 1902, after Joseph Goddard. The post office was discontinued in 1958.
