= Fallsburg, Kentucky =

Unincorporated community in Kentucky, United States

- Unincorporated community
- Location in Kentucky Location in the United States
- Coordinates: 38°10′30″N 82°40′25″W
- Country: United States
- State: Kentucky
- County: Lawrence
- Elevation: 574 ft (175 m)
- Time zone: UTC-5 (Eastern (EST))
  - Summer (DST): UTC-4 (EDT)
- GNIS feature ID: 491966

Fallsburg is an unincorporated community in Lawrence County, Kentucky, United States.

Fallsburg was once the site of a busy mill.

== Notable people ==
- Paul E. Patton, governor of Kentucky
- K.C. Potter, academic administrator and LGBT rights activist
