= Oldtown, Kentucky =

Unincorporated community in Kentucky, United States

Coordinates: 38.440358°N 82.898224°W

Oldtown is an unincorporated community in Greenup County, in the U.S. state of Kentucky.

== History ==
A post office called Oldtown was established in 1836, and remained in operation until 1992. According to tradition, the community was named for an Indian village at the original town site.
