= Tollesboro, Kentucky =

Unincorporated community in Kentucky, United States

Tollesburg, Kentucky
- Unincorporated community
- Tollesburg
- Location in Kentucky Location in the United States
- Coordinates: 38°33′34″N 83°34′34″W
- Country: United States
- State: Kentucky
- County: Lewis
- Elevation: 807 ft (246 m)
- Time zone: UTC-5 (Eastern (EST))
  - Summer (DST): UTC-4 (EST)
- Area code: 41189
- GNIS feature ID: 505325

Tollesburg is an unincorporated community in Lewis County, Kentucky, United States. It lies on the western edge of the county and borders Mason County. The community is part of the Maysville Micropolitan Statistical Area. It is the birthplace of Lucille P. Markey, a racehorse breeder and philanthropist.

Tollesboro is home to the Hickory Grove Campground, where the Emmanuel Methodist Association of Churches holds its annual camp meeting during the latter part of June.
