= Kentucky Route 57 =

State highway in Kentucky, United States

Kentucky Route 57
- KY 57; mainline in red, business route in blue

Route information
- Maintained by KYTC
- Length: 88.035 mi (141.679 km)

Major junctions
- West end: KY 4 in Lexington
- US 460 in North Middletown; KY 36 in Moorefield; KY 32 in Myers; KY 32 / KY 11 / KY 32 Bus. in Flemingsburg; KY 11 / KY 11 Bus. in Flemingsburg; AA Hwy (KY 9) near Tollesboro; KY 10 in Tollesboro
- East end: KY 8 / KY 3550 in Concord

Location
- Country: United States
- State: Kentucky
- Counties: Fayette, Bourbon, Nicholas, Fleming, Lewis

Highway system
- Kentucky State Highway System; Interstate; US; State; Parkways
← KY 56	→ KY 58

Kentucky Route 57 is an 88.035-mile-long (141.679 km) state highway in the U.S. Commonwealth of Kentucky. The western terminus is at KY 4 (New Circle Road) in eastern Lexington. The eastern terminus is at KY 8 on the banks of the Ohio River in Concord. The road runs generally southwest to northeast.

The road is two-lane for its entire length, except for a short distance near the southwestern terminus, where, as Bryan Station Road, KY 57 is four lanes wide with a center turn lane for a fraction of a mile, then two lanes plus a center turn lane for another fraction of a mile.

== Major intersections ==
County	Location	mi	km	Destinations	Notes
Fayette	Lexington	0.000	0.000	KY 4 (New Circle Road) / Bryan Avenue	Southern terminus; road continues southwest into downtown Lexington as Bryan Avenue
Fayette	Lexington	3.050	4.908	KY 1970 east (Bryan Station Road)	Western terminus of KY 1970
Fayette	Lexington	6.756	10.873	KY 1973 (North Cleveland Road/Muir Station Road)	
Fayette	Lexington	7.800	12.553	KY 2335 north (Houston-Antioch Road)	Southern terminus of KY 2335
Fayette	Lexington	8.078	13.000	KY 859 south (Haley Road) to I-64	Northern terminus of KY 859
Bourbon	Clintonville	11.547	18.583	KY 1658 (Pine Grove Road)	
Bourbon		16.643	26.784	KY 627 (Winchester Road)	
Bourbon	North Middletown	22.530	36.259	US 460 west (Main Street) / KY 3364 (College Street) – Paris	South end of US 460 concurrency; 3364 to the west and north
Bourbon	North Middletown	22.737	36.592	US 460 east (Mt. Sterling Road) – Mt. Sterling	North end of US 460 concurrency
Bourbon	Plum	27.752	44.663	KY 537 west (Cane Ridge Road) – Little Rock, Paris	South end of KY 537 overlap
Bourbon	Plum	27.853	44.825	KY 537 east (Bunker Hill Road) – Bunker Hill	North end of KY 537 overlap
Bourbon		29.283	47.126	KY 1198 east (Sharpsburg Road) – Sharpsburg	Western terminus of KY 1198
Nicholas		35.233	56.702	KY 1285 north (East Union Road) – Carlisle	Southern terminus of KY 1285
Nicholas	Moorefield	38.344	61.709	KY 36 east (Moorefield Road)	South end of KY 36 concurrency
Nicholas	Moorefield	38.722	62.317	KY 36 west (Moorefield Road) – Carlisle	North end of KY 36 concurrency
Nicholas	Sprout	42.161	67.852	KY 3315 north (Upper Lick Road)	Southern terminus of KY 3315
Nicholas		43.061	69.300	KY 928 west (Cane Run Road)	Eastern terminus of KY 928
Nicholas		47.457	76.375	KY 32 west (Myers Road) – Myers, Carlisle	South end of KY 32 concurrency
Fleming		52.481	84.460	KY 681 west (Buchanan Road)	Eastern terminus of KY 681
Fleming		53.186	85.595	KY 560 north (Cowan-Ewing Road) – Ewing	Southern terminus of KY 560
Fleming		56.099	90.283	KY 165 north (Ewing Road) – Ewing	Southern terminus of KY 165
Fleming	Elizaville	56.812	91.430	KY 170	
Fleming	Flemingsburg	60.590	97.510	KY 1325 south (Energy Road)	Northern terminus of KY 1325
Fleming	Flemingsburg	60.784	97.822	KY 11 south / KY 32 east (Bypass Road) / KY 32 Bus. east (Elizaville Avenue) – Sharpsburg, Mt. Sterling, Morehead	North end of KY 32 concurrency; south end of KY 11 concurrency; western terminus of KY 32 business route
Fleming	Flemingsburg	61.917	99.646	KY 559 (Helena Road)	
Fleming	Flemingsburg	62.363	100.364	KY 11 north / KY 11 Bus. south (Maysville Road) – Maysville	North end of KY 11 concurrency; northern terminus of KY 11 business route
Fleming		63.039	101.451	KY 597 (Cherry Grove Road)	
Fleming		64.091	103.144	KY 57 Bus. south (Mt. Carmel Road) – Flemingsburg	Northern terminus of KY 57 business route
Fleming		64.930	104.495	KY 3301 east (Beechtree Pike) – Beechburg	Western terminus of KY 3301
Fleming		65.811	105.913	KY 3299 north (Harn Road)	Southern terminus of KY 3299
Fleming		70.587	113.599	KY 344 east (Foxport Road) – Foxport	Western terminus of KY 344
Lewis		72.933	117.374	KY 1237 south (Burtonville Road) – Burtonville	South end of KY 1237 overlap
Lewis		73.627	118.491	KY 1237 north	North end of KY 1237 overlap
Lewis		76.103	122.476	AA Hwy (KY 9) – Vanceburg, Maysville	
Lewis	Tollesboro	76.675	123.396	KY 10 east – Ribolt, Vanceburg	South end of KY 10 concurrency
Lewis	Tollesboro	76.812	123.617	KY 10 west – Maysville	North end of KY 10 concurrency
Lewis		82.176	132.249	KY 984 east	Western terminus of KY 984
Lewis	Concord	88.035	141.679	KY 8 east / KY 3550 west (Main Street) – Concord	Western terminus of KY 8; eastern terminus of KY 3350
1.000 mi = 1.609 km; 1.000 km = 0.621 mi: Concurrency terminus

== Flemingsburg business route ==
Kentucky Route 57 Business
- Location: Flemingsburg
- Length: 2.753 mi (4.431 km)

Kentucky Route 57 Business (KY 57 Bus.) is an 2.753-mile-long (4.431 km) business route through Flemingsburg.

=== Major intersections ===
The entire route is in Fleming County.

Location	mi	km	Destinations	Notes
Flemingsburg	0.000	0.000	KY 11 / KY 32 / KY 57 (Bypass Road / Elizaville Avenue)	Southern terminus; south end of KY 32 Bus. overlap
Flemingsburg	0.921	1.482	KY 2503 south (Clark Street)	Northern terminus of KY 2503
Flemingsburg	1.165	1.875	KY 11 Bus. / KY 32 Bus. east / KY 559 (Water Street)	North end of KY 32 Bus. overlap
Flemingsburg	1.220	1.963	KY 2504 (Main Street)	
	2.753	4.431	KY 57	Northern terminus
1.000 mi = 1.609 km; 1.000 km = 0.621 mi: Concurrency terminus
