= Elizaville =

Elizaville may refer to:

- Elizaville, Indiana, an unincorporated community in Boone County
- Elizaville, Kentucky, a census-designated place and unincorporated community in Fleming County
  - Elizaville Cemetery, in Elizaville, Kentucky
  - Elizaville Presbyterian Church, a historic church in Kentucky
- Elizaville, New York, a hamlet in Columbia County
