= Kentucky Route 111 =

State highway in Kentucky, United States

Kentucky Route 111
- KY 111 highlighted in red

Route information
- Maintained by KYTC
- Length: 21.205 mi (34.126 km)

Major junctions
- South end: US 60 near Owingsville
- North end: KY 32 near Flemingsburg

Location
- Country: United States
- State: Kentucky
- Counties: Bath, Fleming

Highway system
- Kentucky State Highway System; Interstate; US; State; Parkways
← KY 110	→ KY 112

Kentucky Route 111 (KY 111) is a 21.205-mile-long (34.126 km) state highway in Kentucky. It runs from U.S. Route 60 (US 60) east of Owingsville to KY 32 southeast of Flemingsburg via Hillsboro.

== Major intersections ==
County	Location	mi	km	Destinations	Notes
Bath		0.000	0.000	US 60 (Midland Trail)	Southern terminus
Bath		6.157	9.909	KY 1944 south (White Oak Road)	Northern terminus of KY 1944
Bath		7.060	11.362	KY 1602 west (Oakley-Pebble Road)	Eastern terminus of KY 1602
Fleming		9.752	15.694	KY 1722 south (Colfax Road)	Northern terminus of KY 1722
Fleming	Hillsboro	13.694	22.038	KY 158 (Sunset Road)	
Fleming		15.159	24.396	KY 1515 north (Orchard Road)	Southern terminus of KY 1515
Fleming	Poplar Plains	18.711	30.112	KY 156 (Poplar Plains Road / Mt. Hope Road)	
Fleming		21.205	34.126	KY 32	Northern terminus
1.000 mi = 1.609 km; 1.000 km = 0.621 mi
