= Poplar Plains =

Poplar Plains may refer to a location in the United States:

- Poplar Plains, Connecticut, a census-designated place in the town of Westport
- Poplar Plains, Kentucky, an unincorporated community in Fleming County
