= Headquarters, Kentucky =

Unincorporated community in Kentucky, United States

Headquarters
- Unincorporated community
- Location within the state of Kentucky Headquarters (the United States)
- Coordinates: 38°21′30″N 84°6′52″W
- Country: United States
- State: Kentucky
- County: Nicholas
- Elevation: 958 ft (292 m)
- Time zone: UTC-5 (Eastern (EST))
  - Summer (DST): UTC-4 (EDT)
- GNIS feature ID: 493975

Headquarters is an unincorporated community in Nicholas County, Kentucky, United States. It lies along the concurrent Routes 32 and 36 northwest of the city of Carlisle, the county seat of Nicholas County. Its elevation is 958 feet (292 m).

== History ==
A post office operated in Headquarters from 1848 to 1906. The origins of the place name Headquarters is unclear. Some hold it to be the translation of a Native American word, and others claim its name derives from the site's role as an early trading post, while still others believe the name is a corruption of 'headwaters', for its location between the sources of two waterways, Hooktown Branch and Wilbur Run, in the watershed of the South Fork of the Licking River.
