= Kentucky Route 201 =

State highway in Kentucky, United States

Kentucky Route 201
- KY 201 highlighted in red

Route information
- Maintained by KYTC
- Length: 28.6 mi (46.0 km)

Major junctions
- South end: US 23 north of Paintsville
- KY 1559 in Sitka; KY 1092 near Kerz; KY 32 in Blaine
- North end: KY 1 in Webbville

Location
- Country: United States
- State: Kentucky
- Counties: Johnson, Lawrence

Highway system
- Kentucky State Highway System; Interstate; US; State; Parkways
← KY 200	→ KY 202

Kentucky Route 201 (KY 201) is a 28.6-mile-long (46.0 km) state highway in the U.S. state of Kentucky. The highway connects mostly rural areas of Johnson and Lawrence counties with Blaine.

== Route description ==
=== Johnson County ===
KY 201 begins at an intersection with U.S. Route 23 (US 23) north of Paintsville, within Johnson County. It travels to the northwest and curves to a northerly direction. It begins paralleling Goose Fork and has three crossings of the Fork before It intersects KY 1559. The two highway begin a concurrency at this point. They curve to the south-southwest and enter Sitka. There, they curve to the west and pass a U.S. Post Office before they split. KY 201 crosses over Toms Creek and curves to the north and northeast. It then ends its paralleling of Goose Fork before it curves to the north-northwest. It intersects the eastern terminus of KY 1092 northeast of Kerz. It begins paralleling Hood Creek. It curves to the northeast and crosses the creek twice before it curves to the north-northwest. It crosses over the creek, Fitch, Morning, and Sloane branches and intersects the northern terminus of KY 3387 (Head of Hood). Almost immediately after this intersection, KY 201 enters Lawrence County and Davisville.

=== Lawrence County ===
It crosses over Ramey and Tarkiln branches before entering Blaine. It crosses Muddy Branch before it begins a brief concurrency with KY 32. The two highway travel to the east-southeast and cross over Hood Creek. They immediately curve to the north-northeast and split. KY 201 crosses over Burton Branch, begins paralleling Blaine Creek, and leaves Blaine. It crosses over the creek and travels through Cherokee. The highway crosses over Able, Griffin, and Sawmill branches. Then, it crosses over Cherokee Creek. Just before it curves to the northwest, it crosses over Dry Fork and begins paralleling it. It crosses over Camp, Thompson, Wildlick branches before it crosses over Dry Fork again. It has one final crossing of Dry Fork just before it meets its northern terminus, an intersection with KY 1 in Webbville.

== Major intersections ==
County	Location	mi	km	Destinations	Notes
Johnson		0.0	0.0	US 23 – Paintsville, Louisa	Southern terminus
Johnson		2.7	4.3	KY 1559 east	Southern end of KY 1559 concurrency
Johnson	Sitka	3.3	5.3	KY 1559 west	Northern end of KY 1559 concurrency
Johnson		6.1	9.8	KY 1092 west	Eastern terminus of KY 1092
Johnson		10.3	16.6	KY 3387 south (Head of Hood)	Northern terminus of KY 3387
Lawrence	Blaine	15.3	24.6	KY 32 west – Sandy Hook	Southern end of KY 32 concurrency
Lawrence	Blaine	15.6	25.1	KY 32 east – Louisa	Northern end of KY 32 concurrency
Lawrence	Webbville	28.6	46.0	KY 1 – Louisa, Grayson	Northern terminus
1.000 mi = 1.609 km; 1.000 km = 0.621 mi: Concurrency terminus
