= East Union, Kentucky =

Unincorporated community in Kentucky, United States

East Union
- Unincorporated community
- Location within the state of Kentucky East Union (the United States)
- Coordinates: 38°14′24″N 83°58′50″W
- Country: United States
- State: Kentucky
- County: Nicholas
- Elevation: 853 ft (260 m)
- Time zone: UTC-5 (Eastern (EST))
  - Summer (DST): UTC-4 (EDT)
- GNIS feature ID: 507901

East Union is an unincorporated community in Nicholas County, Kentucky, United States. It lies along Route 57 south, south of the city of Carlisle, the county seat of Nicholas County. Its elevation is 853 feet (260 m).

== History ==
First settled about 1800, the name East Union may have been chosen for the community's location east of the confluence of Somerset and Hinkston creeks. East Union was once known as Bramlett, with a post office. The village had a physician, Dr. Buntin, Class of 1890, Louisville School of Medicine. The only church there is the East Union Christian Church, the second-oldest active Christian church in the United States. There was once a grist mill located along Somerset Creek below the settlement. The cemetery has soldiers from the Civil War from the North and the South. Notables buried there include Peter Hon (1791–1876). Hon was a well known evangelist among the Christian churches. In his life he baptized approximately 5,000 people. East Union is near the Concord Christian Church in Nicholas County and the Cane Ridge Meeting House in Bourbon County.
