= Hillsboro, Kentucky =

Unincorporated community in Kentucky, United States

- Unincorporated community
- Location within Kentucky
- Coordinates: 38°17′36″N 83°39′32″W
- Country: United States
- State: Kentucky
- County: Fleming
- Elevation: 863 ft (263 m)

Population (2024)
  - Total: 4,664
- Time zone: UTC-5 (Eastern (EST))
  - Summer (DST): UTC-4 (EDT)
- ZIP code: 41049
- Area code: 606
- GNIS feature ID: 494271

Hillsboro is an unincorporated community in Fleming County, Kentucky, United States. Hillsboro is located at the junction of Kentucky Route 111 and Kentucky Route 158, 9.8 miles (15.8 km) south-southeast of Flemingsburg. The population was 4,664 in 2024.

== History ==
First called Foudraysville, named after the Foudray family of early settlers, it was renamed Hillsboro when the post office opened in 1833. In 1874, a fire was started by robbers, burning several buildings in the center of town, including E. G. SHIELDS' store, J. W. CRAIN'S store, the wholesale house of J.A.H. KERNS, and the drugstore of L. J. JONES. The buildings, however, were all replaced after the first fire. In 1917, a second fire burned buildings in the same area.

Hillsboro Covered Bridge, which is listed on the National Register of Historic Places, is located in Hillsboro.
