= Concord, Kentucky =

City in Kentucky, United States

- City
- Location in Lewis County, Kentucky
- Coordinates: 38°41′15″N 83°29′29″W
- Country: United States
- State: Kentucky
- County: Lewis

Area
  - Total: 0.073 sq mi (0.19 km^{2})
  - Land: 0.062 sq mi (0.16 km^{2})
  - Water: 0.012 sq mi (0.03 km^{2})
- Elevation: 518 ft (158 m)

Population (2020)
  - Total: 19
  - Density: 307.4/sq mi (118.68/km^{2})
- Time zone: UTC-5 (Eastern (EST))
  - Summer (DST): UTC-4 (EDT)
- ZIP code: 41179
- Area code: 606
- FIPS code: 21-16894
- GNIS feature ID: 2404115

Concord is a home rule-class city in Lewis County, Kentucky, in the United States. The population was 19 at the 2020 census, making it the least populated city in Kentucky after South Park View dissolved in 2023. It is part of the Maysville Micropolitan Statistical Area.

== Geography ==
Concord is located in northwestern Lewis County on the south bank of the Ohio River. Kentucky Route 8 has its western terminus in the city and leads southeast 15 miles (24 km) to Vanceburg, the Lewis county seat. Kentucky Route 57 has its eastern terminus in Concord and leads southwest 11 miles (18 km) to Tollesboro. The nearest crossings of the Ohio River are the Simon Kenton Memorial Bridge, 24 miles (39 km) by road west of Concord at Maysville, and the Carl Perkins Bridge, 34 miles (55 km) east of Concord at South Portsmouth.

According to the United States Census Bureau, the city has a total area of 0.07 square miles (0.19 km^{2}), of which 0.06 square miles (0.16 km^{2}) are land and 0.01 square miles (0.03 km^{2}), or 16.67%, are water.

== Demographics ==
Historical population
Census	Pop.	Note	%±
1870	228		—
1880	178		−21.9%
1890	188		5.6%
1900	200		6.4%
1910	213		6.5%
1920	194		−8.9%
1930	164		−15.5%
1940	160		−2.4%
1950	142		−11.2%
1960	83		−41.5%
1970	108		30.1%
1980	67		−38.0%
1990	65		−3.0%
2000	28		−56.9%
2010	35		25.0%
2020	19		−45.7%
U.S. Decennial Census

As of the census of 2000, there were 28 people, 13 households, and 9 families residing in the city. The population density was 478.4 inhabitants per square mile (184.7/km^{2}). There were 16 housing units at an average density of 273.4 per square mile (105.6/km^{2}). The racial makeup of the city was 96.43% White, and 3.57% from two or more races.

There were 13 households, out of which 23.1% had children under the age of 18 living with them, 53.8% were married couples living together, 7.7% had a female householder with no husband present, and 23.1% were non-families. 15.4% of all households were made up of individuals, and 7.7% had someone living alone who was 65 years of age or older. The average household size was 2.15 and the average family size was 2.30.

In the city, the population was spread out, with 14.3% under the age of 18, 7.1% from 18 to 24, 17.9% from 25 to 44, 50.0% from 45 to 64, and 10.7% who were 65 years of age or older. The median age was 50 years. For every 100 females, there were 115.4 males. For every 100 females age 18 and over, there were 118.2 males.

The median income for a household in the city was $18,125, and the median income for a family was $20,625. Males had a median income of $11,250 versus $0 for females. The per capita income for the city was $7,897. There were no families and 23.3% of the population living below the poverty line, including no under eighteens and none of those over 64.

== See also ==
- List of cities and towns along the Ohio River
