= Moorefield, Kentucky =

Unincorporated community in Kentucky, United States

Moorefield
- Unincorporated community
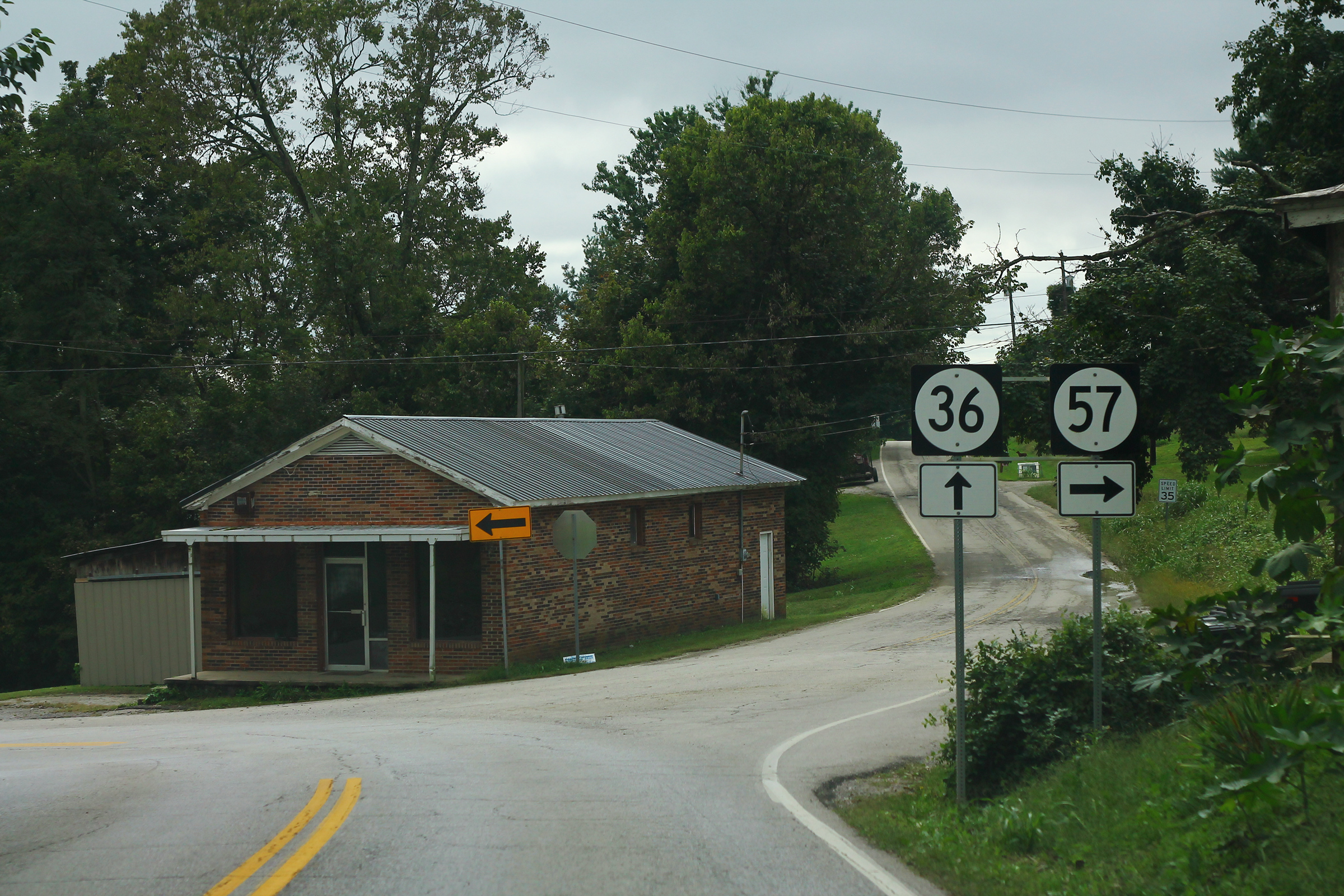

- Location within the state of Kentucky Moorefield (the United States)
- Coordinates: 38°16′23″N 83°55′52″W
- Country: United States
- State: Kentucky
- County: Nicholas
- Elevation: 988 ft (301 m)

Population (2010)
  - Total: 228
- Time zone: UTC-5 (Eastern (EST))
  - Summer (DST): UTC-4 (EDT)
- ZIP codes: 40350
- GNIS feature ID: 498562

Moorefield is an unincorporated community in Nicholas County, Kentucky, United States. It lies along Routes 36 and 57 southeast of the city of Carlisle, the county seat of Nicholas County. Its elevation is 988 feet (301 m). It has a post office with the ZIP code 40350.

== Notable people ==
- Robert M. Talbert, Missouri politician and chaplain
