= Muses Mills, Kentucky =

Unincorporated community in Kentucky, United States

- Unincorporated community
- Location within Kentucky Location within the United States
- Coordinates: 38°21′00″N 83°31′38″W
- Country: United States
- State: Kentucky
- County: Fleming
- Elevation: 715 ft (218 m)
- Time zone: UTC-5 (Eastern (EST))
  - Summer (DST): UTC-4 (EDT)
- ZIP code: 41065
- Area code: 606
- GNIS feature ID: 514171

Muses Mills is an unincorporated community in Fleming County, Kentucky, United States. The community is located along Kentucky Route 1013 12.3 miles (19.8 km) east-southeast of Flemingsburg. Muses Mills has a post office with ZIP code 41065.
