= Wallingford, Kentucky =

Unincorporated community in Kentucky, United States

- Unincorporated community
- Location within Kentucky Location within the United States
- Coordinates: 38°24′18″N 83°36′44″W
- Country: United States
- State: Kentucky
- County: Fleming
- Elevation: 794 ft (242 m)
- Time zone: UTC-5 (Eastern (EST))
  - Summer (DST): UTC-4 (EDT)
- ZIP code: 41093
- Area code: 606
- GNIS feature ID: 506152

Wallingford is an unincorporated community in Fleming County, Kentucky, United States. The community is located along Kentucky Route 559 6.7 miles (10.8 km) east of Flemingsburg. Wallingford has a post office with ZIP code 41093.
