= Buzzard Roost =

Buzzard Roost may refer to:

- Buzzard Roost, Alabama, an unincorporated community in Colbert County, Alabama, United States
- Buzzard Roost Covered Bridge, a historic covered bridge in Colbert County, Alabama, which burned down in 1972
- Buzzard Roost Trail, a hiking trail in Southern Indiana, United States; part of the Hoosier National Forest
- Buzzard Roost, the highest point in the South Mountains range of North Carolina, United States
- Sprout, Kentucky, an unincorporated community in Nicholas County, Kentucky, United States, formerly known as Buzzard Roost
- Buzzardroost Rock Trail, a hiking trail in the Edge of Appalachia Nature Preserve in southern Ohio
