= Talbert =

Talbert is a surname of Germanic origin. It is recorded in Scotland in the 16th century. The name refers to:

- Ansel Talbert (1912–1987), American aviation journalist
- Bill Talbert (1918–1999), American professional tennis player
- Bruce James Talbert (1838–1881), British architect and interior designer
- David E. Talbert (born 1966), American dramatist
- Destin Talbert (born 1999), American football player
- Diron Talbert (born 1944), American professional football player
- Don Talbert (born 1939), American professional football player
- Florence Cole Talbert (1890–1961), American operatic soprano
- Mary Burnett Talbert (1866–1923), American suffragist and reformer
- Michel Talbert, pseudonym of French poet and fantasy writer Michel Bernanos (1923–1964)
- Richard Talbert (born 1947), British-American historian, classicist, and professor
- Robert M. Talbert (1880–1952), American politician
- W. Jasper Talbert (1846–1931), American politician
