= Upper Blue Licks, Kentucky =

Unincorporated community in Kentucky, United States

Upper Blue Licks
- Unincorporated community
- Location within the state of Kentucky Upper Blue Licks (the United States)
- Coordinates: 38°19′55″N 83°51′24″W
- Country: United States
- State: Kentucky
- County: Nicholas
- Elevation: 627 ft (191 m)
- Time zone: UTC-5 (Eastern (EST))
  - Summer (DST): UTC-4 (EDT)
- GNIS feature ID: 509264

Upper Blue Licks is an unincorporated community located in Nicholas County, Kentucky, United States. Its post office closed in 1873.

Area first discovered by Simon (Butler) Kenton and Thomas Williams. March, 1775
