= Ewing, Kentucky =

Ewing
- City
- Location of Ewing in Fleming County, Kentucky.
- Coordinates: 38°25′40″N 83°51′43″W
- Country: United States
- State: Kentucky
- County: Fleming

Area
  - Total: 0.25 sq mi (0.65 km^{2})
  - Land: 0.25 sq mi (0.65 km^{2})
  - Water: 0 sq mi (0.00 km^{2})
- Elevation: 929 ft (283 m)

Population (2020)
  - Total: 228
  - Density: 910.3/sq mi (351.45/km^{2})
- Time zone: UTC-5 (EST)
  - Summer (DST): UTC-4 (EDT)
- ZIP code: 41039
- Area code: 606
- FIPS code: 21-25786
- GNIS feature ID: 2403585

Ewing is a home rule-class city in Fleming County, Kentucky, in the United States. As of the 2020 census, Ewing had a population of 228 inhabitants.

== Geography ==
Ewing is located in western Fleming County. Kentucky Route 165 passes through the community, leading east 2 miles (3 km) to Elizaville and northwest 4.5 miles (7.2 km) to U.S. Route 68. Flemingsburg, the county seat, is 7.5 miles (12.1 km) to the east via Route 165 and Kentucky Route 32.

According to the United States Census Bureau, Ewing has a total area of 0.25 square miles (0.65 km^{2}), all land.

== History ==
In 1871, resident and heir Robert Ewing donated land in order to bring the Maysville and Lexington Railroad to the area. In 1873, the post office was established, with Ewing postmaster, who gave the town his name. The city was formally incorporated by the state assembly in 1979.

== Demographics ==
Historical population
Census	Pop.	Note	%±
1980	144		—
1990	268		86.1%
2000	278		3.7%
2010	264		−5.0%
2020	228		−13.6%
U.S. Decennial Census

As of the census of 2000, there were 278 people, 107 households, and 78 families residing in the city. The population density was 1,098.0 inhabitants per square mile (423.9/km^{2}). There were 119 housing units at an average density of 470.0 per square mile (181.5/km^{2}). The racial makeup of the city was 100.00% White.

There were 107 households, out of which 36.4% had children under the age of 18 living with them, 55.1% were married couples living together, 16.8% had a female householder with no husband present, and 26.2% were non-families. 25.2% of all households were made up of individuals, and 16.8% had someone living alone who was 65 years of age or older. The average household size was 2.60 and the average family size was 3.06.

In the city, the population was spread out, with 27.7% under the age of 18, 6.5% from 18 to 24, 29.1% from 25 to 44, 21.2% from 45 to 64, and 15.5% who were 65 years of age or older. The median age was 35 years. For every 100 females, there were 87.8 males. For every 100 females age 18 and over, there were 79.5 males.

The median income for a household in the city was $32,083, and the median income for a family was $36,250. Males had a median income of $27,292 versus $18,750 for females. The per capita income for the city was $15,991. About 14.0% of families and 17.6% of the population were below the poverty line, including 26.2% of those under the age of eighteen and 8.9% of those 65 or over.

== Notable people ==
- Hobart Freeman, author and charismatic preacher
- Woodie Fryman, former Major League Baseball pitcher; inductee in the Kentucky sports Hall of Fame
