= Kentucky Route 32 =

State highway in Kentucky, United States

Kentucky Route 32
- KY 32; mainline in red, business route in blue

Route information
- Maintained by KYTC
- Length: 174.381 mi (280.639 km)

Major junctions
- West end: US 62 in Georgetown
- US 25 in Georgetown; I-75 near Sadieville; US 25 near Sadieville; US 27 / US 62 in Cynthiana; US 68 near Carlisle; I-64 near Morehead; US 60 in Morehead; US 23 near Louisa
- East end: KY 3 in Louisa

Location
- Country: United States
- State: Kentucky
- Counties: Scott, Harrison, Bourbon, Nicholas, Fleming, Rowan, Elliott, Lawrence

Highway system
- Kentucky State Highway System; Interstate; US; State; Parkways
← US 31W	→ KY 33

Kentucky Route 32 (KY 32) is a 161.773-mile state highway in Kentucky that runs from US 62 in Georgetown to KY 3 in Louisa.

== Major intersections ==
County	Location	mi	km	Destinations	Notes
Scott	Georgetown	0.000	0.000	US 62 (Cherry Blossom Way)	Western terminus
Scott	Georgetown	2.314	3.724	US 25 (Cincinnati Road)	
Scott	Georgetown	3.216	5.176	KY 1143 south (Georgetown Bypass)	Northern terminus of KY 1143
Scott	Stamping Ground	7.934	12.769	KY 1688 west (Sebree Road)	Eastern terminus of KY 1688
Scott	Sadieville	18.930	30.465	KY 1636 south (Indian Creek Road)	Northern terminus of KY 1636
Scott	Sadieville	22.316	35.914	I-75 south	Exit 136 from I-75 south and ramp to I-75 south
Scott	Sadieville	22.723	36.569	I-75 north	Exit 136 from I-75 north and ramp to I-75 north
Scott	Sadieville	23.003	37.020	US 25 south	Southern end of overlap with US 25
Scott	Sadieville	23.259	37.432	US 25 north	Northern end of overlap with US 25
Harrison		30.767	49.515	KY 3044 south (Coppage Road)	Northern terminus of KY 3044
Harrison	Connersville	32.488	52.284	KY 1842 south (Leeslick-Connerville Pike)	Southern end of KY 1842 overlap
Harrison	Connersville	32.744	52.696	KY 1842 north (White Oak Tricum Pike)	Northern end of KY 1842 overlap
Harrison	Cynthiana	34.786	55.983	KY 3018 north (Mill Creek Road)	Southern terminus of KY 3018
Harrison	Cynthiana	37.975	61.115	US 27	Cynthiana bypass
Harrison	Cynthiana	38.352	61.722	US 27 Bus. / US 62 south	Former route of US 27 prior to bypass. Southern end of overlap with US 27Bus/US 62.
Harrison	Cynthiana	38.722	62.317	KY 3016 west	South end of KY 3016 overlap
Harrison	Cynthiana	38.893	62.592	KY 3016 west	North end of KY 3016 overlap
Harrison	Cynthiana	39.520	63.601	US 27 Bus. / US 62 north / KY 36 west (Paris Pike)	Northern end of overlap with US 27-Business/US 62. West end of KY 36 overlap.
Harrison	Cynthiana	40.020	64.406	KY 982 south (South Church Street)	Northern terminus of KY 982
Harrison	Cynthiana	43.052	69.285	KY 1940 south (Ruddells Mill Road)	Northern terminus of KY 1940
Harrison	Cynthiana	44.796	72.092	KY 1771 south (Monson Road)	Northern terminus of KY 1771
Harrison	Cynthiana	45.319	72.934	KY 1298 north	Southern terminus of KY 1298
Bourbon		47.670	76.717	KY 1879 south	Northern terminus of KY 1879
Nicholas		49.413	79.523	KY 1298 west	Eastern terminus of KY 1298
Nicholas	Carlisle	54.318	87.416	US 68 south / KY 36 east (Maysville Road)	Eastern end of KY 36 overlap. South end of overlap with US 68
Nicholas	Carlisle	55.276	88.958	KY 1244 north (Barterville Road)	Southern terminus of KY 1244
Nicholas	Carlisle	55.328	89.042	US 68 north (Maysville Road)	Northern end of US 68 overlap
Nicholas	Carlisle	57.509	92.552	KY 36 west (Concrete Road)	West end of KY 36 overlap
Nicholas	Carlisle	57.915	93.205	KY 3316 south (South Elm Street)	Northern terminus of KY 3316
Nicholas	Carlisle	58.043	93.411	KY 36 east (East Main Street)	East end of KY 36 overlap
Nicholas	Carlisle	58.789	94.612	KY 1455 north (Lake Road)	Southern terminus of KY 1455
Nicholas	Carlisle	60.377	97.167	KY 1658 north (Stoney Creek Road)	Southern terminus of KY 1658
Nicholas	Myers	64.355	103.569	KY 57 south (Cassidy Creek Road)	Northern terminus of KY 57
Fleming	Cowan	68.776	110.684	KY 681 west (Buchanan Road)	Eastern terminus of KY 681
Fleming	Cowan	69.481	111.819	KY 560 north (Cowan-Ewing Road)	Southern terminus of KY 560
Fleming	Ewing	70.202	112.979	KY 165 north (Pike Bluff Road)	Southern terminus of KY 165
Fleming	Elizaville	73.710	118.625	KY 170 (Junction Road)	
Fleming	Flemingsburg	76.488	123.096	KY 1325 south (Energy Road)	Northern terminus of KY 1325
Fleming	Flemingsburg	77.684	125.020	KY 11 north (Bypass Road) / KY 32 Bus. east (Elizaville Avenue)	KY 32 follows the bypass (KY 11) south; 32-Business follows the former route of 32 east into Flemingsburg.
Fleming	Flemingsburg	81.413	131.022	KY 11 south (Mt. Sterling Road) / KY 11 Bus. north (Mt. Sterling Avenue)	End of overlap with KY 11; KY 11 continues south; KY 11 Business follows former route of KY 11 into Flemingsburg.
Fleming	Flemingsburg	83.475	134.340	KY 697 south (Fleming Road)	Northern terminus of KY 697
Fleming	Flemingsburg	83.696	134.696	KY 32 Bus. west (Mockingbird Hill)	Eastern terminus of 32 Business route (former KY 32 prior to bypass being built)
Fleming	Flemingsburg	84.564	136.093	KY 111 south (Hillsboro Road)	Northern terminus of KY 111
Fleming	Bluebank	87.800	141.300	KY 156 west (Mt. Hope Road)	Eastern terminus of KY 156
Fleming	Plummers Landing	93.710	150.812	KY 1013 south (Hillsboro-Plummers Landing Road)	West end of KY 1013 overlap
Fleming	Plummers Mill	94.714	152.427	KY 1013 north (Plummers Landing Road)	East end of KY 1013 overlap
Fleming	Plummers Mill	95.259	153.305	KY 3303 west (Plummers Mill Road)	Eastern terminus of KY 3303
Fleming	Vanceburg	99.625	160.331	KY 1895 west (Maxxy Flats Road)	Eastern terminus of KY 1895
Rowan	Morehead	100.683	162.034	KY 158 west (Sharkey Road)	Eastern terminus of KY 158
Rowan	Morehead	102.305	164.644	KY 785 north (Big Brushy Road)	Southern terminus of KY 785
Rowan	Morehead	104.132	167.584	KY 377 north (Cranston Road)	
Rowan	Morehead	104.453	168.101	KY 3531 (Viking Drive)	Rowan County Senior High School
Rowan	Morehead	105.160	169.239	I-64 west – Lexington	Exit 136 from I-64 West and ramp to I-64 West
Rowan	Morehead	105.299	169.462	I-64 east – Ashland	Exit 136 from I-64 East and ramp to I-64 East
Rowan	Morehead	105.616	169.972	KY 3319 south (Forest Hills Drive)	Northern terminus of KY 3319
Rowan	Morehead	108.080	173.938	US 60 west (West Wilkinson Boulevard)	South end of overlap with US 60
Rowan	Morehead	108.841	175.163	Morehead State University (University Boulevard)	
Rowan	Rodburn	110.149	177.268	US 60 east (Highway 60)	North end of overlap with US 60
Rowan		116.367	187.275	KY 3318 north (Open Fork Road)	Southern terminus of KY 3318
Rowan	Elliottville	118.013	189.924	KY 3317 west (CCC Trail)	Eastern terminus of KY 3317
Rowan	Elliottville	118.419	190.577	KY 504 north	Southern terminus of KY 504
Rowan		119.597	192.473	KY 173 south	Northern terminus of KY 173
Elliott	Newfoundland	132.092	212.581	KY 7 north	Northern end of overlap with KY 7
Elliott	Sandy Hook	133.642	215.076	KY 557 west	Milepoint for KY 7. Eastern terminus of KY 557
Elliott	Sandy Hook	135.828	218.594	KY 7 south (Main Street)	Southern end of overlap with KY 7
Elliott		138.631	223.105	KY 719 south	Northern terminus of KY 719
Elliott	Isonville	141.181	227.209	KY 706 south	West end of brief overlap of KY 706
Elliott	Isonville	141.297	227.395	KY 706 north	East end of brief overlap of KY 706
Elliott	Isonville	141.926	228.408	KY 486 north	Southern terminus of KY 486
Lawrence	Martha	151.069	243.122	KY 469 south	Northern terminus of KY 469
Lawrence	Blaine	155.058	249.542	KY 3394 north (Cains Creek Road)	Southern terminus of KY 3394
Lawrence	Blaine	155.269	249.881	KY 2562 north (Blaine School Road)	Southern terminus of KY 2562
Lawrence	Blaine	155.977	251.021	KY 201 south	South end of short overlap of KY 201
Lawrence	Blaine	156.184	251.354	KY 201 north	North end of short overlap of KY 201
Lawrence		166.248	267.550	KY 1760 south	Northern terminus of KY 1760
Lawrence		168.252	270.775	KY 3215 north – Yatesville Lake State Park	Southern terminus of KY 3215
Lawrence	Louisa	170.223	273.947	KY 3395 east (Isaac Branch Road) to US 23	Western terminus of KY 3395
Lawrence	Louisa	172.239	277.192	KY 3396 north (Five Forks-Twomile Creek Road)	Southern terminus of KY 3396
Lawrence	Louisa	172.824	278.133	KY 32 Conn. to US 23 (Louisa Bypass)	Connector to US 23
Lawrence	Louisa	173.685	279.519	KY 2565 south	South end of brief overlap with KY 2565
Lawrence	Louisa	174.029	280.073	KY 2565 north	North end of KY 2565 overlap
Lawrence	Louisa	174.381	280.639	KY 3	Eastern terminus
1.000 mi = 1.609 km; 1.000 km = 0.621 mi: Concurrency terminus

== Flemingsburg business route ==
Kentucky Route 32 Business
- Location: Flemingsburg

Kentucky Route 32 Business (KY 32 Bus.) is a 2.7-mile-long (4.3 km) business route through Flemingsburg.

=== Major intersections ===
The entire route is in Fleming County.

Location	mi	km	Destinations	Notes
Flemingsburg	0.000	0.000	KY 11 / KY 32 / KY 57 (Bypass Road / Elizaville Avenue)	Western terminus; west end of KY 57 Bus. overlap
Flemingsburg	0.921	1.482	KY 2503 south (Clark Street)	Northern terminus of KY 2503
Flemingsburg	1.165	1.875	KY 11 Bus. north / KY 559 west (West Water Street) / KY 57 Bus. east (North Main Cross Street)	East end of KY 57 Bus. overlap; west end of KY 11 Bus. / KY 559 overlap
Flemingsburg	1.300	2.092	KY 11 Bus. south (Mt. Sterling Avenue) / KY 559 east (Fox Spring Avenue)	East end of KY 11 Bus. / KY 559 overlap
Flemingsburg	1.719	2.766	KY 2507 north (Rucker Street)	Southern terminus of KY 2507
Flemingsburg	1.762	2.836	KY 2506 north (Foster Street)	Southern terminus of KY 2506
	3.682	5.926	KY 32 / Coskery Pike	Eastern terminus; continues as Coskery Pike beyond KY 32
1.000 mi = 1.609 km; 1.000 km = 0.621 mi: Concurrency terminus

0.135
