= Hooktown, Kentucky =

Unincorporated community in Kentucky, United States

Hooktown
- Unincorporated community
- Location within the state of Kentucky Hooktown (the United States)
- Coordinates: 38°21′16″N 84°9′6″W
- Country: United States
- State: Kentucky
- County: Nicholas
- Elevation: 794 ft (242 m)
- Time zone: UTC-5 (Eastern (EST))
  - Summer (DST): UTC-4 (EDT)
- GNIS feature ID: 508274

Hooktown is an unincorporated community in Nicholas County, Kentucky, United States. It lies along the concurrent Routes 32 and 36 northwest of Nicholas County. Its elevation is 794 feet (242 m).
