= Ryan, Kentucky =

Unincorporated community in Kentucky, United States

- Unincorporated community
- Location within the state of Kentucky
- Coordinates: 38°22′12″N 83°28′58″W
- Country: United States
- State: Kentucky
- County: Fleming
- Elevation: 814 ft (248 m)
- Time zone: UTC-5 (Eastern (EST))
  - Summer (DST): UTC-4 (EDT)
- ZIP code: 41093
- Area code: 606
- GNIS feature ID: 515152

Ryan is an unincorporated community in Fleming County, Kentucky, United States.
