= Kentucky Route 165 =

State highway in Kentucky

Kentucky Route 165

Route information
- Maintained by KYTC
- Length: 36.247 mi (58.334 km)

Major junctions
- West end: KY 32 / Pike Bluff Road near Ewing
- US 68 in rural Fleming Co; US 62 in Mount Olivet
- East end: KY 19 near Brooksville

Location
- Country: United States
- State: Kentucky
- Counties: Fleming, Robertson

Highway system
- Kentucky State Highway System; Interstate; US; State; Parkways
← I-165	→ KY 166

Kentucky Route 165 (KY 165) is a 36.247-mile-long (58.334 km) state highway in Kentucky. It runs from KY 32 and Pike Bluff Road southeast of Ewing to KY 19 southwest of Brooksville via Ewing and Mount Olivet.

== Major intersections ==
County	Location	mi	km	Destinations	Notes
Fleming		0.000	0.000	KY 32 / Pike Bluff Road	Southern terminus; continues beyond KY 32 as Pike Bluff Road
Fleming	Ewing	1.794	2.887	KY 560 north (Metcalf Mill Road)	South end of KY 560 overlap
Fleming	Ewing	2.004	3.225	KY 560 south (Cowan-Ewing Road)	North end of KY 560 overlap
Fleming		6.239	10.041	US 68 east	South end of US 68 overlap
Fleming		8.067	12.983	KY 2505 north (Mount Pleasant Road) / Willow Road	Southern terminus of KY 2505
Robertson		9.646	15.524	US 68 west	North end of US 68 overlap
Robertson		10.977	17.666	KY 1029 north (Old Blue Lick Road)	Southern terminus of KY 1029
Robertson		14.465	23.279	KY 617 west (Piqua-Kentontown Road) / Piqua Lane	Eastern terminus of KY 617
Robertson		16.554	26.641	KY 1476 west (Thomas Pike)	Eastern terminus of KY 1476
Robertson	Mount Olivet	19.189	30.882	US 62 east (North Main Street)	South end of US 62 overlap
Robertson	Mount Olivet	19.442	31.289	US 62 west (West Walnut Street)	North end of US 62 overlap
Robertson		21.67	34.87	KY 875 north	Southern terminus of KY 875
Bracken		29.733	47.851	KY 19	Northern terminus
1.000 mi = 1.609 km; 1.000 km = 0.621 mi
