= Daniel Boone Cabin =

Coordinates: 38.3305°N 84.0627°W

Daniel Boone Cabin in Carlisle, Kentucky

Daniel Boone Cabin is a historic log cabin at 3750 Maysville Road in Carlisle, Kentucky, where frontiersman Daniel Boone and Rebecca Boone lived with their family from 1795 to 1799 on land owned by his son Daniel Morgan Boone before the family moved to Missouri. It was Boone's last log cabin in Kentucky, and possibly his only surviving log cabin in the state.

Daniel Boone lived on the 57-acre property where he had large vegetable gardens and enjoyed hunting for game in the area. It was his last cabin in Kentucky. While at this cabin, he worked as a surveyor and attempted to win a contract to improve the Wilderness Road. Boone also travelled regularly to Blue Licks to make salt used for food preservation. In the early 1900s the whole building and chimney were moved about 500 yards from the nearby Brushy Creek on the property. During this move workers found a letter from pioneer Simon Kenton in a log behind the fireplace mantel. Clapboards had protected the exterior of the logs helping preserve the building, but those clapboards have been removed. Henry Ford attempted to purchase the museum for $10,000 to move it to Greenfield Village in Michigan but the offer was rejected, so that it could remain at the original site. The cabin is now a free museum and currently sits adjacent to Wendts Wildlife Adventures.

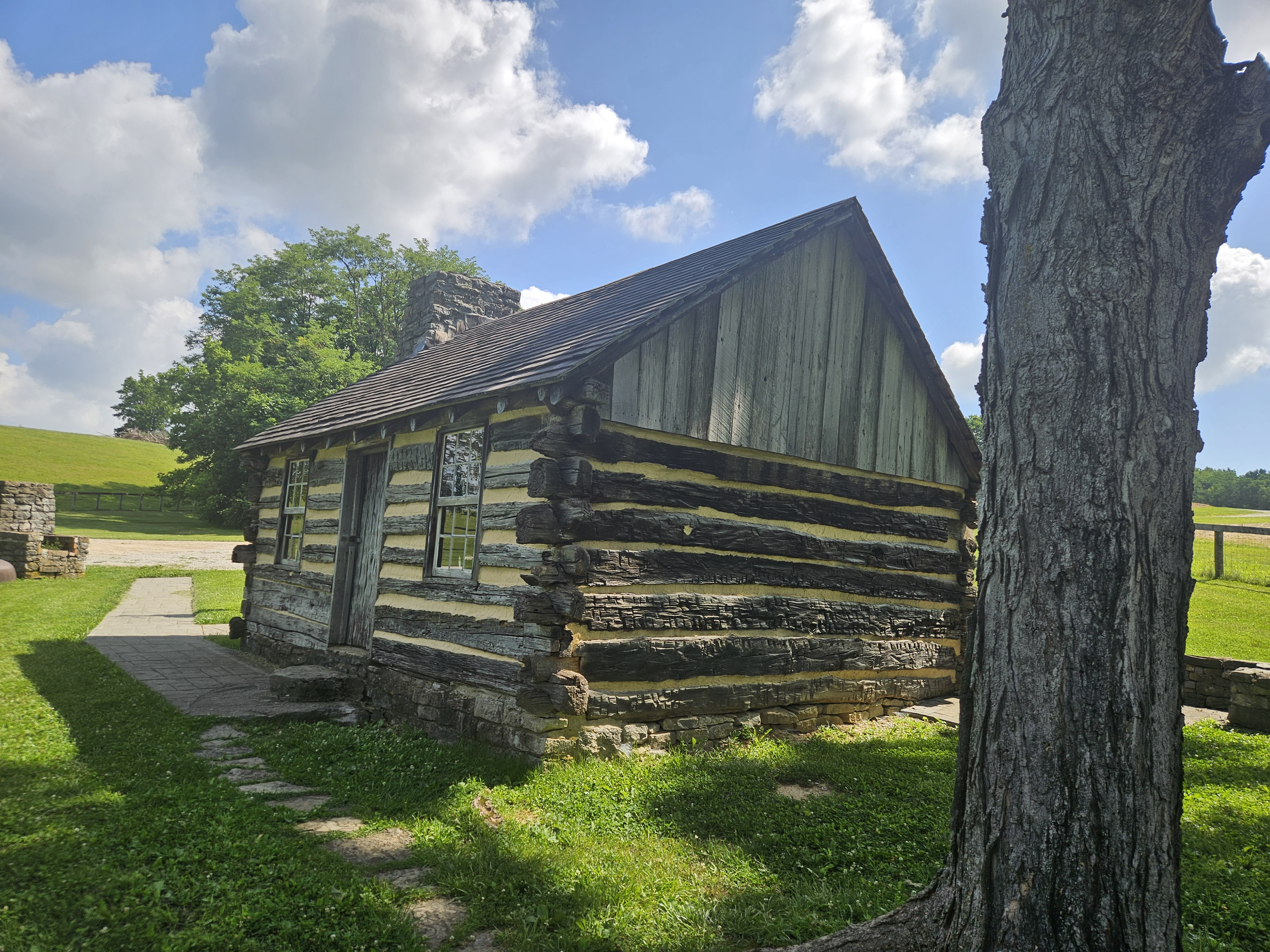
Exterior rear of cabin

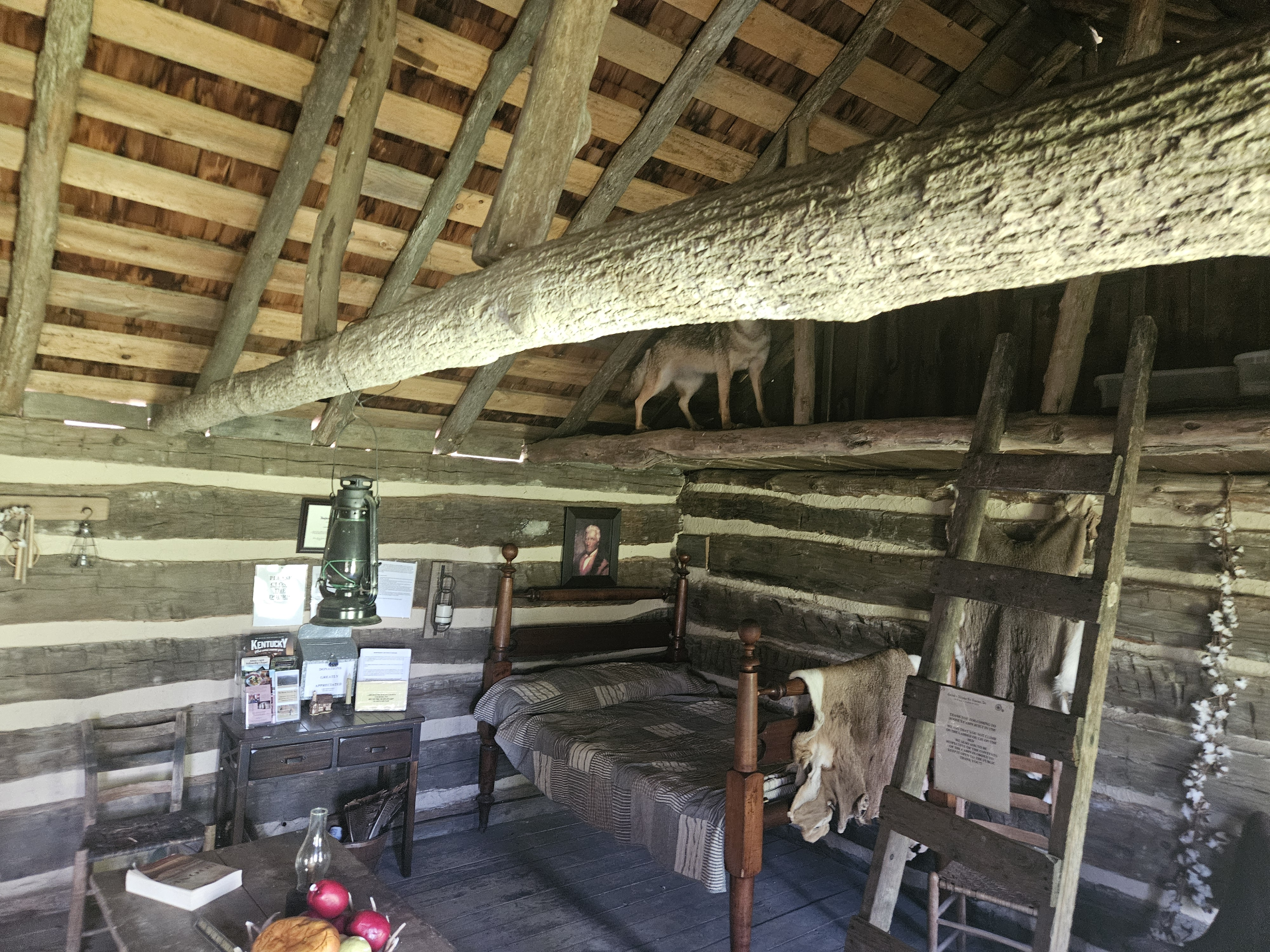
Interior of cabin

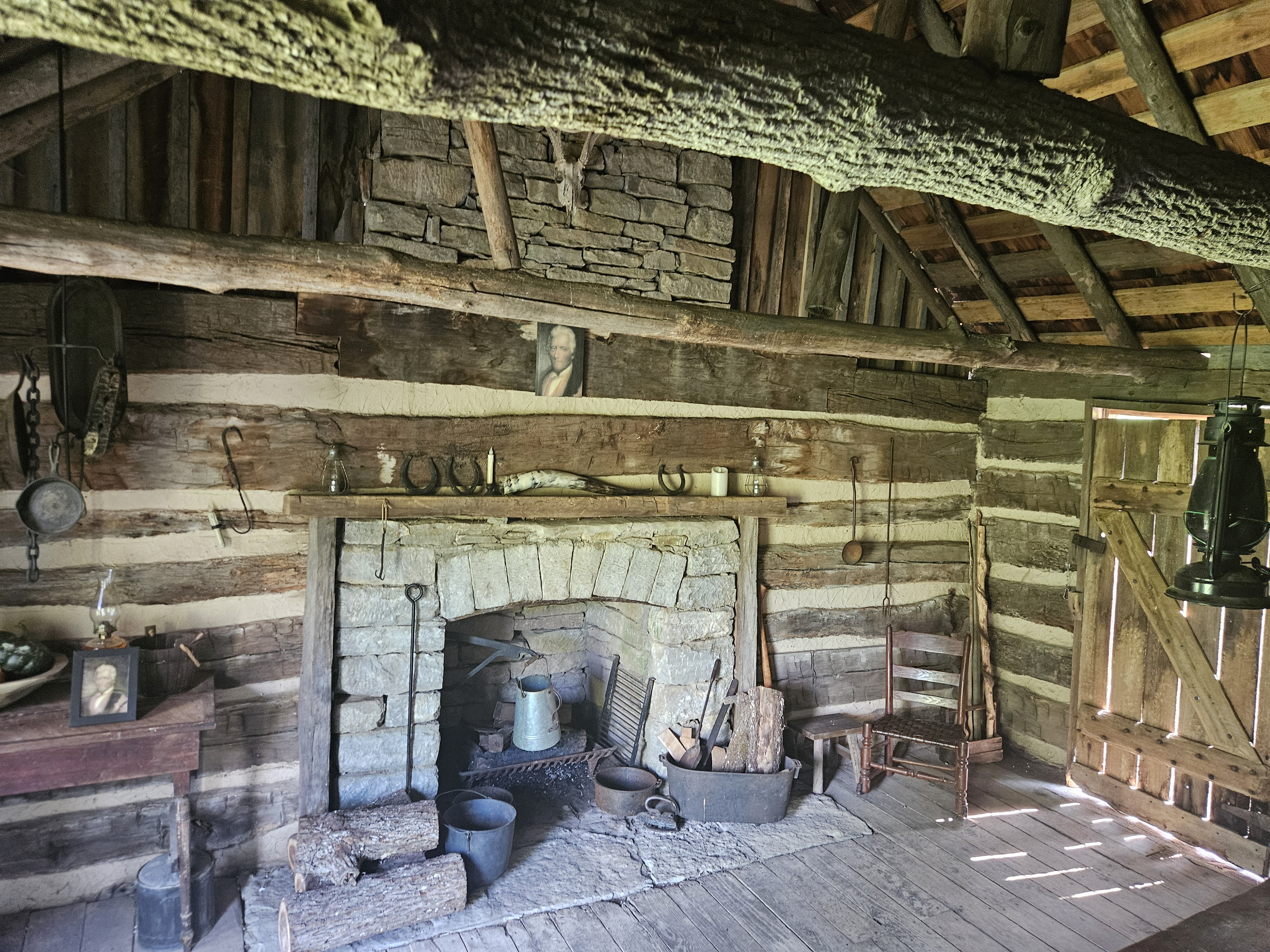
Interior of cabin

== Exterior links ==
- Official website
