= William F. Spurgin =

US Army brigadier general 1838–1904

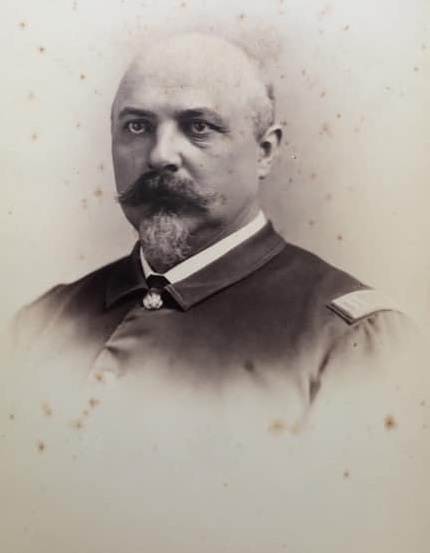
- Spurgin as a captain, c. 1885
- Born: October 18, 1838; Carlisle, Kentucky, US
- Died: August 6, 1904 (aged 65); Carlisle, Kentucky, US
- Burial place: West Point Cemetery
- Alma mater: DePauw University (attended); United States Military Academy (attended)
- Spouse: Martha Lucia Hair (m. 1861–1904)
- Children: 4
- Military career
- Allegiance: Union (American Civil War); United States
- Service: Union Army; United States Army
- Service years: 1862–1864 (Union Army); 1866–1902 (US Army)
- Rank: Brigadier General
- Commands: 4th Infantry Regiment; Department of Texas
- Wars: American Civil War; American Indian Wars; Spanish–American War; Philippine–American War

William F. Spurgin (October 18, 1838 – August 6, 1904) was a career officer in the United States Army. A veteran of the American Civil War, American Indian Wars, Spanish–American War, and Philippine–American War, he served in the Union Army from 1862 to 1864, and the US Army from 1866 until retiring a few months before reaching the mandatory retirement age of 64. He attained the rank of brigadier general in May 1902, and retired later that month.

== Early life ==
William Fletcher Spurgin was born in Carlisle, Kentucky on 18 October 1838, a son of David McKendree Spurgin and Amanda (Secrest) Spurgin. David Spurgin moved his jewelry and photography business to Greencastle, Indiana in the early 1850s, where Spurgin was raised and educated. He attended Asbury University (now DePauw University) from 1854 to 1857. (Note: In 1890, DePauw awarded Spurgin the honorary degree of Master of Arts.) In 1858, he obtained an appointment to the United States Military Academy from U.S. Representative John G. Davis.

Spurgin attended West Point from May 1858 until July 1861, when he left because he intended to join the Union Army during the American Civil War. In December 1861, he married Martha Lucia Hair. They were the parents of four children; David, William, Margaretta, and Horace. In June 1862, he was commissioned as a first lieutenant and assigned as adjutant of the 54th Indiana Infantry Regiment. In September, he was promoted to captain.

In April 1864, Spurgin was assigned to the 15th United States Colored Infantry Regiment. In June, he was transferred to the 100th U.S. Colored Infantry. Spurgin was discharged from the volunteers in December 1864 and received a brevet promotion to major to recognize his heroism at the November 1864 Battle of Johnsonville and December 1864 Battle of Nashville. During 1865 and part of 1866, Spurgin was superintendent of the Freedman's Employment Agency in Washington, D.C.

== Continued career ==
In July 1866, Spurgin returned to military service when he was commissioned as a first lieutenant in the 38th Infantry Regiment, a unit of black soldiers and white officers. In June 1876, he was promoted to captain in the 21st Infantry Regiment. He received promotion to major in the 23rd Infantry in December 1897, and lieutenant colonel in the 16th Infantry in May 1899. In March 1901, Spurgin was promoted to colonel and assigned to command the 4th Infantry Regiment.

Spurgin was a veteran of the 1877 Nez Perce War and the 1878 Bannock War. He served as the treasurer of the United States Military Academy from September 1881 to April 1898. He was the academy's quartermaster from May 1898 to May 1899, which included preparing soldiers and recent graduates for overseas service during the Spanish–American War. From September 1899 to October 1900, Spurgin performed Philippine–American War duty as collector of customs for the Philippines. In April 1902, he was assigned to command the Department of Texas, the position he held at the time of his retirement. On 16 May 1902, Spurgin was promoted to brigadier general. He requested retirement on 29 May, a few months before he would have reached the mandatory retirement age of 64.

In retirement, Spurgin resided first in Brooklyn, New York and later in Washington, D.C. He was a member of the Sons of the Revolution and Military Order of the Loyal Legion of the United States. He died in Carlisle, Kentucky on 6 August 1904 while he was there to visit relatives. Spurgin was buried at West Point Cemetery.
