= Plummers Landing, Kentucky =

- Unincorporated community
- Location within Kentucky Location within the United States
- Coordinates: 38°19′08″N 83°33′40″W
- Country: United States
- State: Kentucky
- County: Fleming
- Elevation: 659 ft (201 m)
- Time zone: UTC-5 (Eastern (EST))
  - Summer (DST): UTC-4 (EDT)
- ZIP code: 41081
- Area code: 606
- GNIS feature ID: 514665

Plummers Landing is an unincorporated community in Fleming County, Kentucky, United States. The community is 8 miles (13 km) southeast of Flemingsburg. Plummers Landing has a post office with ZIP code 41081.
