= Elizaville Presbyterian Church =

Historic church in Kentucky, United States

- U.S. National Register of Historic Places
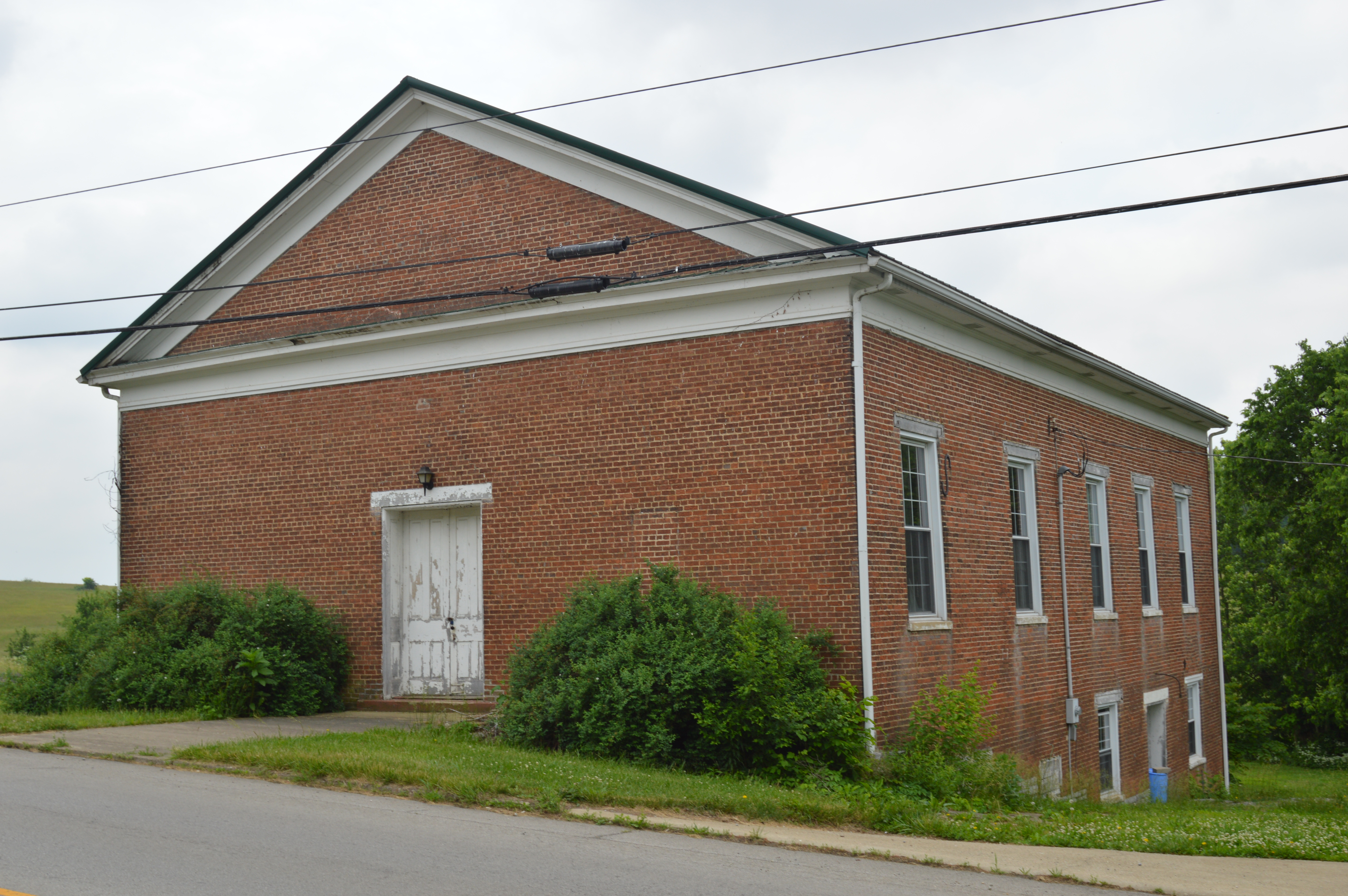
- Front and western side; no tower apparent

- Location within Kentucky Location within the United States
- Location: KY 32, Elizaville, Kentucky
- Coordinates: 38°25′10″N 83°49′27″W
- Area: less than one acre
- Built: 1861
- Architectural style: Greek Revival
- NRHP reference No.: 77000616
- Added to NRHP: June 17, 1977

Elizaville Presbyterian Church is a historic church on Kentucky Route 32 in Elizaville, Kentucky. It was built in 1861 and added to the National Register of Historic Places in 1977.

It is a Flemish-bond brick front-gabled building which had an octagonal tower and spire over its entrance.

== See also ==
- National Register of Historic Places listings in Kentucky
