= Mary Eulalie Shannon =

American poet

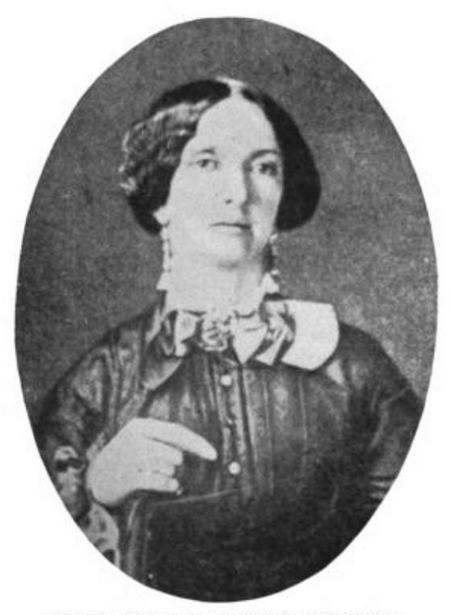
- Born: Mary Eulalie Fee; February 9, 1824; Flemingsburg, Kentucky, U.S.
- Died: December 26, 1855 (aged 31); Auburn, California, U.S.
- Occupations: poet, short story writer
- Spouse: John Shannon (m. 1854)
- Relatives: John Carver
- Writing career
- Pen name: "Eulalie"
- Notable works: Buds, Blossoms, and Leaves

Mary Eulalie Shannon (née, Fee; pen name, Eulalie; February 9, 1824 – December 26, 1855) was an American poet and short story writer. Born in Kentucky and raised in Ohio, she removed to California after she married. In that state, she was the first woman to have a volume of her poems published. She was also one of California's first short story writers.

== Early life and education ==
Mary Eulalie Fee was born at Flemingsburg, Kentucky, February 9, 1824. She was the third child of William Robert Fee and Elizabeth Dutton (Carver) Fee. William Fee, a native of Scott County, Kentucky, was born in the pioneer days of 1793. Shannon was thus one of the first few women poets of Southern birth, although she was not included in Lucian Lamar Knight's biographical dictionary of Southern literary people in the Library of Southern Literature. Shannon was a descendant, on her father's side, from the family to which John Philpot Curran belonged. Shannon's mother, Elizabeth Fee, born at Castleton, Vermont, in 1795. She was the seventh generation from John Carver, a Pilgrim pioneer who came to the United States in the Mayflower and served as first Governor of Plymouth, Massachusetts. The mother and her parents crossed the Allegheny Mountains in covered wagons and settled at Marietta, Ohio, in 1812, where, at seventeen, she became a school teacher, and is said to have been a "great student of history, Shakespeare and the Bible".

Shannon's parents were married at Marietta, Ohio, on October 26, 1817. Shannon's childhood home "Dove Cottage" was built by her father at New Richmond, Ohio. Her father died when she was eleven years old. Her mother was left in poor financial circumstances, but was obliged nonetheless to provide for, and educate her family, until her two sons were old enough to assist. Yet Shannon was well-educated by the best private tutors in Cincinnati, not only in the branches of learning ordinary for young women, but was given the best opportunities for musical culture which the city afforded. Among her intimates there were Joseph Anguel Augustin Tosso, the violinist of the Middle West of the period; and Henry Warrels, the guitarist; as well as Alice and Phoebe Cary.

== Career ==
When still quite young, Shannon wrote verses which her friends found pleasing. Later, she became a contributor to The Columbian, Great West, Cincinnati Daily Times, Arthur's Home Magazine, and other periodicals. She wrote with great ease, and was very reluctant to revise.

At New Richmond, Ohio, on January 31, 1854, she married John Shannon (1817–1860), then editor of a newspaper at Auburn, California. In February, she accompanied her husband to his home, looking forward to new literary opportunities in California. She arrived in the state as early as April 10, 1854. They made this home at the Junction House, in the Sierras, a stage station 2 miles (3.2 km) from Auburn, where branched in the 1850s the stagecoach line from Sacramento to Dutch Flat and Yankee Jims, one of the largest and liveliest mining camps in the state. Shannon was the object of pride, love and interest by hundreds of young mining adventurers whọ daily passed the station, and she became widely-famous in the mines.

Depending upon the definition of the term, it may be said that Shannon was hardly a California poet, although she called herself "a Californian" in her correspondence with Eastern newspapers. She contributed a series, "Travel Scenes", written for the Cincinnati Daily Times, after her arrival in California, beginning in April, 1854, and extending to December, 1854, the last date a few weeks before her death. There were at least nine columns by her entitled "Leaves From the Diary of a Californian", published by Dollar Times. She wrote the story, "Frank Waterford, a Tale of the Mines", for the Placer Democrat, published at Auburn by her husband. A three-column story, "A Lost Waif, Mining, in California", dated Auburn, October, 1854, was written for the Dollar Times. All this was among the first California story writing. In addition, the Daily Democratic State Journal published an announcement of a lecture by her on "Home", delivered at McNulty Music Hall in Old Sacramento.

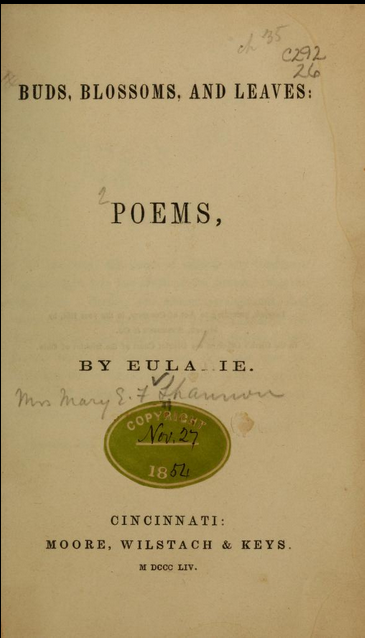
Buds, Blossoms, and Leaves

Shannon sent her poetry collection to Cincinnati for publication because California lacked a publishing house in 1854. Buds, Blossoms, and Leaves was published in August of that year by Moore, Wilstach, Keys & Co., Cincinnati, as a duodecimo of 194 pages. If there were no other evidence, the book's preface, dated June, 1854, indicates she was a resident of California when the book left the press. None of the poems show a California influence, and all were probably written before her departure from Ohio. One is entitled "To Frank-In California". "Lines" was "suggested by the death of James D. Turner, who died in Nevada City, California, August 4th, 1851", according to a note. "The Desert Burial" resulted from the receipt of a letter on the death in the desert of an immigrant to California. The poems must have had a considerable circulation in California as they were often found in the state's used bookstores during the later half of the 19th century.

== Death and legacy ==
Shannon's health, which had never been robust, rapidly declined after arriving in California, and she died in childbirth, in Auburn, on December 26, 1855. Among the papers, returned from California to her friends in Cincinnati, was a poem containing a painful foreboding that she would never return to the east:—

There's a storied vale romantic
Beyond the wide Atlantic,
Where the red June rose is blushing
'Neath the melody outgushing
From each embowering grove.
Shall my feet again be roaming,
In the evening's pleasant gloaming,
Where they were wont to rove?
The fitful winds are sighing o'er and o'er,
And my heart-chords low replying, nevermore.

Shannon's obituary in The Auburn Whig said, "she was generally known in this State as 'Eulalie'". Her headstone was found at one time in an abandoned cemetery in Auburn, now known as Sierra Park, with nothing inscribed on it but the word, "Eulalie". The headstone was moved to the Odd Fellows Cemetery. Her grave is believed to be on the site of the Auburn Veterans Memorial Hall.
