= Kentucky Route 859 =

State highway in Kentucky, United States

Kentucky Route 859
- Haley Road
- KY 859 highlighted in red

Route information
- Maintained by KYTC
- Length: 3.184 mi (5.124 km)

Major junctions
- South end: US 60
- I-64
- North end: KY 57

Location
- Country: United States
- State: Kentucky
- Counties: Fayette

Highway system
- Kentucky State Highway System; Interstate; US; State; Parkways
| ← KY 858 | → KY 860 |

Kentucky Route 859 (KY 859) is a 3.184-mile-long (5.124 km), rural, secondary state highway located entirely in Fayette County in east-central Kentucky. It is locally known as Haley Road, and mainly traverses the eastern portions of the county.

== Route description ==
KY 859 originates with a junction with U.S. Route 60 (US 60) east of the Lexington area. It provides access to Interstate 64 (I-64) before it ends at an intersection with KY 57 (Briar Hill Road).

== Major intersections ==
The entire route is in Fayette County.

| Location | mi | km | Destinations | Notes |
|---|---|---|---|---|
| | 0.000 | 0.000 | US 60 (Winchester Road) to I-75 – Lexington, Winchester | Southern terminus |
| | 1.431 | 2.303 | I-64 east – Ashland | Exit 87 off I-64 EB and On-ramps to I-64 EB |
| | 1.481 | 2.383 | I-64 west – Lexington | Exit 87 off I-64 WB and On-ramps to I-64 WB |
| | 3.184 | 5.124 | KY 57 (Briar Hill Road) | Northern terminus |
1.000 mi = 1.609 km; 1.000 km = 0.621 mi
