= Blaine, Kentucky =

- Unincorporated community
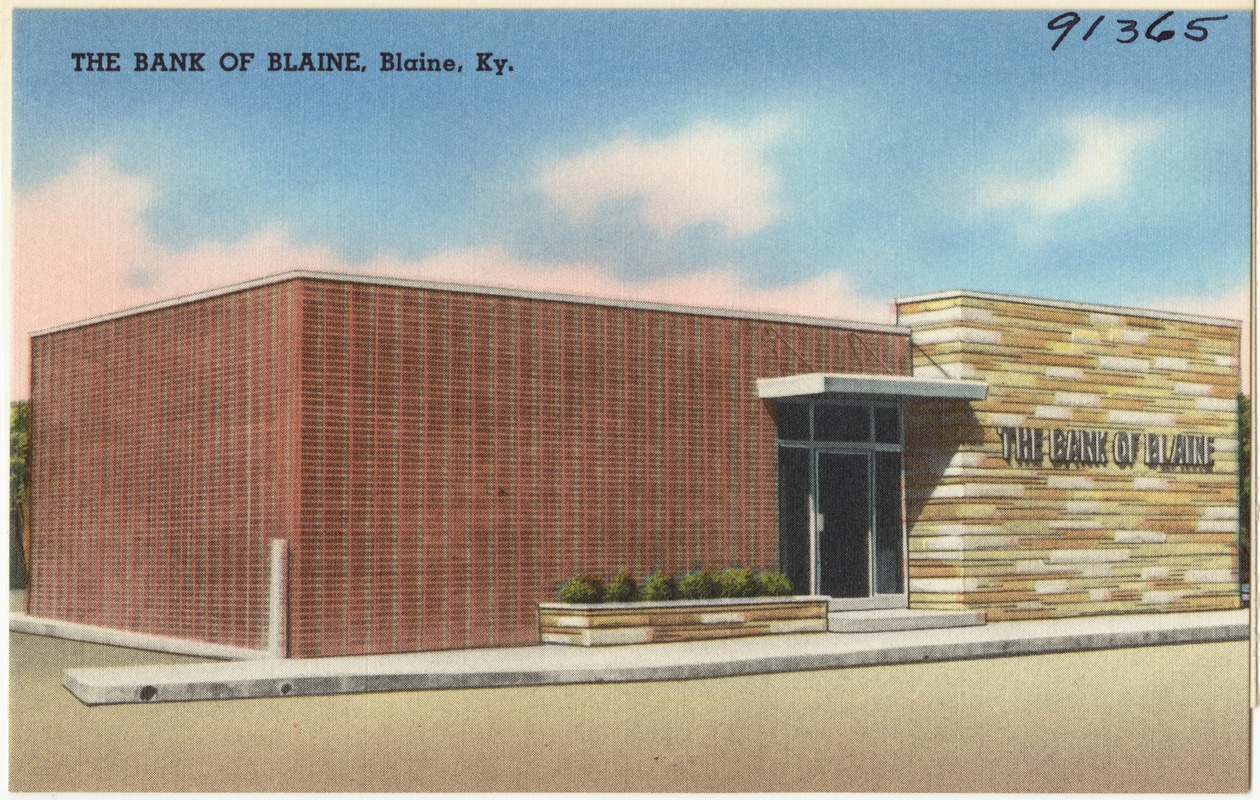
- Bank of Blaine, c. 1930-45

- Location in Lawrence County, Kentucky
- Coordinates: 38°01′38″N 82°50′29″W
- Country: United States
- State: Kentucky
- County: Lawrence
- Incorporated: March 10, 1886
- Dissolved: April 20, 2022

Government
  - Type: City Commission (former)

Area
  - Total: 0.29 sq mi (0.74 km^{2})
  - Land: 0.28 sq mi (0.73 km^{2})
  - Water: 0 sq mi (0.00 km^{2})
- Elevation: 646 ft (197 m)

Population (2020)
  - Total: 66
  - Density: 230/sq mi (90/km^{2})
- Time zone: UTC-5 (Eastern (EST))
  - Summer (DST): UTC-4 (EDT)
- ZIP code: 41124
- Area code: 606
- FIPS code: 21-07264
- GNIS feature ID: 2403873

Blaine is an unincorporated community in Lawrence County, Kentucky, United States. The population was 66 at the 2020 census. Blaine was a former home rule-class city and dissolved its government in 2022.

== History ==
Blaine was originally settled c. 1800 and established as a local trade center by 1882. The post office has been in operation since at least May 10, 1828 (Neri Swetnam, postmaster). Although the city was incorporated as "Blaine" on March 10, 1886, it was alternatively known as "Blainetown" or "Mouth of Hood" for the remainder of the 19th century.

The Blaine city government was officially dissolved on April 20, 2022, by circuit judge John David Preston. The last mayor was Geneva Wheeler, who remained in office until 2014. No one had stood for election to the four person city commission since 2010, and no one served on the commission after 2012.

== Geography ==
Blaine is located in western Lawrence County in the valley of Blaine Creek, a northeast-flowing tributary of the Big Sandy River. Hood Creek joins Blaine Creek from the south at Blaine.

Kentucky Route 32 passes through Blaine, leading east 18 miles (29 km) to Louisa and west 20 miles (32 km) to Sandy Hook. Kentucky Route 201 passes through the center of Blaine with KY 32 but leads north 13 miles (21 km) to Webbville and south 18 miles (29 km) to Staffordsville.

According to the United States Census Bureau, the city has a total area of 0.29 square miles (0.74 km^{2}), of which 0.43 acres (1,757 m^{2}), or 0.24%, are water.

=== Climate ===
The climate in this area is characterized by relatively high temperatures and evenly distributed precipitation throughout the year. According to the Köppen Climate Classification system, Blaine has a Humid subtropical climate, abbreviated "Cfa" on climate maps.

Climate data for Blaine, Kentucky
Month	Jan	Feb	Mar	Apr	May	Jun	Jul	Aug	Sep	Oct	Nov	Dec	Year
Mean daily maximum °C (°F)	6 (42)	8 (46)	13 (56)	21 (69)	25 (77)	28 (83)	30 (86)	30 (86)	27 (80)	21 (70)	14 (57)	8 (47)	19 (67)
Mean daily minimum °C (°F)	−8 (18)	−7 (20)	−2 (28)	3 (37)	8 (47)	13 (56)	16 (61)	16 (60)	12 (53)	4 (39)	−1 (30)	−5 (23)	4 (39)
Average precipitation mm (inches)	86 (3.4)	74 (2.9)	100 (4)	100 (4)	110 (4.2)	89 (3.5)	130 (5.3)	79 (3.1)	89 (3.5)	64 (2.5)	79 (3.1)	91 (3.6)	1,100 (43)
Source: Weatherbase

== Demographics ==
Historical population
Census	Pop.	Note	%±
1900	134		—
1910	136		1.5%
1920	103		−24.3%
1930	144		39.8%
1940	124		−13.9%
1970	168		—
1980	358		113.1%
1990	271		−24.3%
2000	245		−9.6%
2010	47		−80.8%
2020	66		40.4%
U.S. Decennial Census

At the 2000 census, there were 245 people, 95 households and 74 families residing in the city. The population density was 74.9 inhabitants per square mile (28.9/km^{2}). There were 113 housing units at an average density of 34.6 per square mile (13.4/km^{2}). The racial makeup of the city was 99.18% White, and 0.82% from two or more races.

There were 95 households, of which 34.7% had children under the age of 18 living with them, 58.9% were married couples living together, 13.7% had a female householder with no husband present, and 21.1% were non-families. 20.0% of all households were made up of individuals, and 10.5% had someone living alone who was 65 years of age or older. The average household size was 2.58 and the average family size was 2.89.

Age distribution was 25.3% under the age of 18, 8.2% from 18 to 24, 26.9% from 25 to 44, 25.7% from 45 to 64, and 13.9% who were 65 years of age or older. The median age was 33 years. For every 100 females, there were 105.9 males. For every 100 females age 18 and over, there were 96.8 males.

The median household income was $16,250, and the median family income was $24,000. Males had a median income of $26,250 versus $9,688 for females. The per capita income for the city was $9,740. About 29.4% of families and 39.0% of the population were below the poverty line, including 51.8% of those under the age of eighteen and 21.2% of those 65 or over.

== Education ==
Blaine Elementary School is a K–8 school which services the surrounding area. For the 2024–25 academic year, the school had 149 students enrolled. Following the eighth grade, students attend Lawrence County High School in the county seat of Louisa.
