= Myers, Kentucky =

Unincorporated community in Kentucky, United States

Myers
- Unincorporated community
- Location within the state of Kentucky Myers (the United States)
- Coordinates: 38°21′3″N 83°57′12″W
- Country: United States
- State: Kentucky
- County: Nicholas
- Elevation: 627 ft (191 m)
- Time zone: UTC-5 (Eastern (EST))
  - Summer (DST): UTC-4 (EDT)
- GNIS feature ID: 499146

Myers is an unincorporated community in Nicholas County, Kentucky, United States. It lies along Route 32 northeast of the city of Carlisle, the county seat of Nicholas County. Its elevation is 627 feet (191 m).
