= Sprout, Kentucky =

Unincorporated community in Kentucky, United States

Sprout
- Unincorporated community
- Location within the state of Kentucky Sprout (the United States)
- Coordinates: 38°18′7″N 83°53′12″W
- Country: United States
- State: Kentucky
- County: Nicholas
- Elevation: 751 ft (229 m)
- Time zone: UTC-6 (Central (CST))
  - Summer (DST): UTC-5 (CST)
- GNIS feature ID: 509114

Sprout is an unincorporated community in Nicholas County, Kentucky, United States. It was also known as Buzzard Roost or The Roost. The Sprout Post Office closed in 1907. Of note, the Buzzard Roost Post Office, closed in 1861.

The community was named after the local Shrout family (a transcription error accounts for the error in spelling, which was never corrected).
