= Sitka, Kentucky =

Unincorporated community in Kentucky, United States

- Unincorporated community
- Location within Kentucky Location within the United States
- Coordinates: 37°52′50″N 82°50′18″W
- Country: United States
- State: Kentucky
- County: Johnson
- Elevation: 712 ft (217 m)
- Time zone: UTC-5 (Eastern (EST))
  - Summer (DST): UTC-4 (EDT)
- ZIP codes: 41255
- GNIS feature ID: 509066

Sitka is an unincorporated community with U.S. Post Office centered on KY Route 201, in Johnson County, Kentucky, United States. It is located at an elevation of 712 feet (217 m). Sitka's ZIP code is 41255.
