= Elizaville Cemetery =

Cemetery in Fleming County, Kentucky

Coordinates: 38°24′57″N 83°49′33″W

- Interactive map of Elizaville Cemetery

Details
- Location: Elizaville, Kentucky

The Elizaville Cemetery is located in Elizaville, Kentucky.

== Notable burials ==
- Woodie Fryman (1940–2011), Major League Baseball left-handed pitcher (1966–83)
- Franklin Sousley (1925–1945), one of six U.S. Marines to raise the American flag on Mount Suribachi during the Battle of Iwo Jima in 1945.
