= Kerz, Kentucky =

Unincorporated community in Kentucky, United States

- Unincorporated community
- Location within Kentucky Location within the United States
- Coordinates: 37°55′00″N 82°50′23″W
- Country: United States
- State: Kentucky
- County: Johnson
- Elevation: 843 ft (257 m)
- Time zone: UTC-5 (Eastern (EST))
  - Summer (DST): UTC-4 (EDT)
- ZIP codes: 41255
- GNIS feature ID: 508383

Kerz is an unincorporated community in Johnson County, Kentucky, United States. It is located at an elevation of 843 feet (257 m). Its ZIP code is 41255.
