= Robert M. Talbert =

American politician (1880–1952)

Robert Macey Talbert

Member of the Missouri House of Representatives from the Cape Girardeau County district
- In office 1933–1939

Personal details
- Born: September 23, 1880 Moorefield, Kentucky
- Died: January 31, 1952 Sikeston, Missouri
- Party: Democratic
- Spouse: Edith Frances Harris
- Children: 2 (1 son, 1 daughter)
- Education: Transylvania University
- Occupation: politician, minister, lawyer

Robert Macey Talbert (September 23, 1880 – January 31, 1952) was an American politician from Cape Girardeau County, Missouri, in the United States, who served in the Missouri House of Representatives. He was a chaplain for the National Guard, the Missouri state senate in 1925, and the Missouri Constitutional Convention of 1922. He later served as a lieutenant colonel and chaplain for the 35th Division of the U.S. Army just before the United States entered World War II.
