= Herman Chittison =

American jazz pianist (1908–1967)

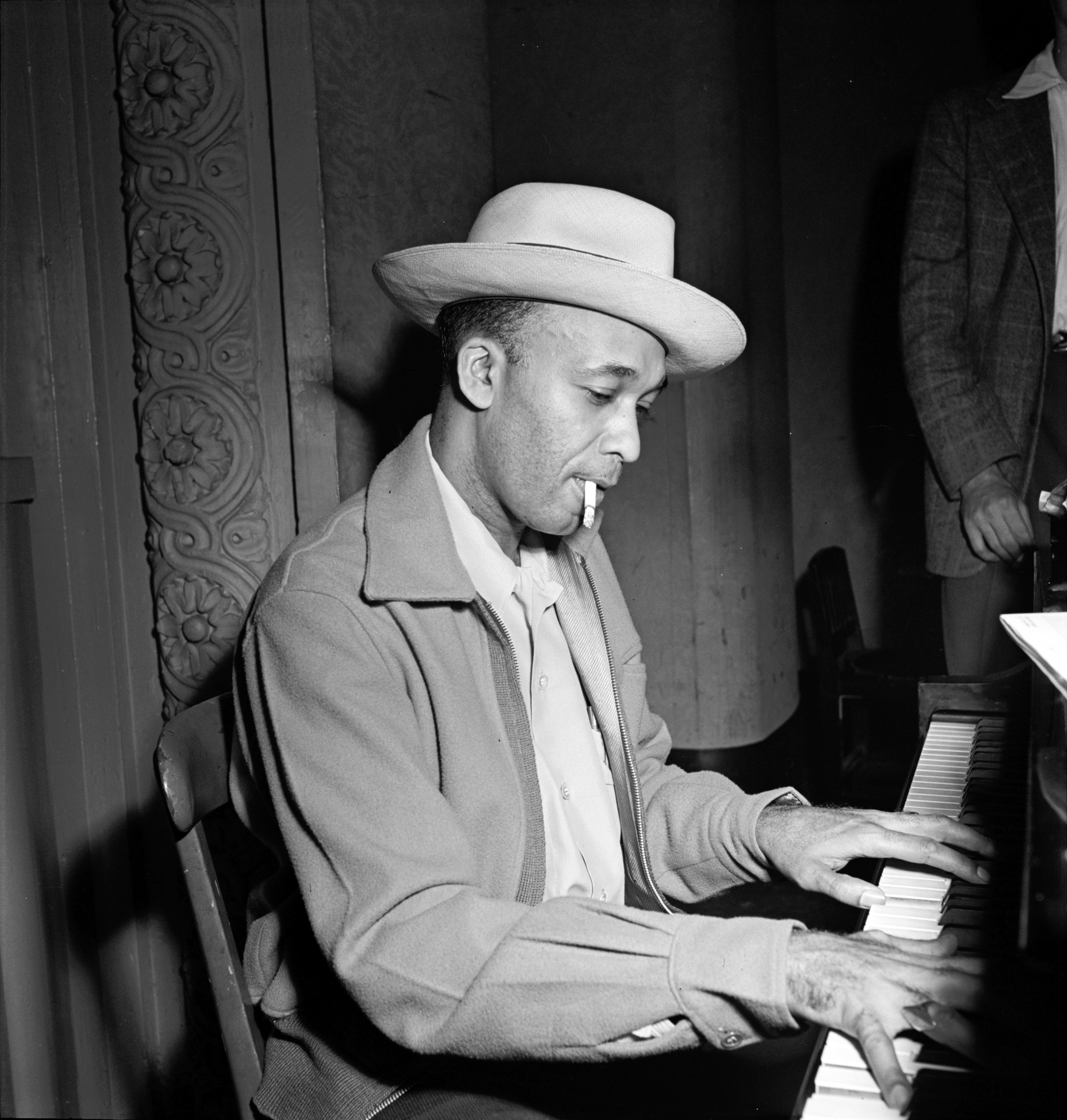
- Chittison, c. October 1946, photographed by William P. Gottlieb

Background information
- Born: October 15, 1908; Flemingsburg, Kentucky, U.S.
- Died: March 8, 1967 (aged 58) Cleveland, Ohio, U.S.
- Genres: Jazz
- Occupation: Musician
- Instrument: Piano

Herman "Ivory" Chittison (October 15, 1908 – March 8, 1967) was an American jazz pianist.

== Biography ==
Born in Flemingsburg, Kentucky, he began his career in 1928 as a member of Zack Whyte's territory band in Ohio. Chittison moved to New York in the early 1930s and found work as an accompanist to Ethel Waters, Adelaide Hall, and Clarence Williams. He also visited Boston for the first time with a traveling show headlined by comic actor Stepin Fetchit. In late 1933, he toured Europe with the Willie Lewis Orchestra; the following year, he recorded with Louis Armstrong in Paris. He and trumpeter Bill Coleman led the Harlem Rhythm Makers. Chittison and Coleman left Lewis' group in 1938 and formed a band that worked extensively in Cairo, Egypt, and traveled as far east as India. After the Italian invasion of Egypt in 1940, Chittison's escape was facilitated by Stepin Fetchit, to whom he was then indebted; the documentary filmmaker and jazz aficionado Jean Bach, who was invited backstage by Fetchit after one of his performances at the Cotton Club, recounted: "[Fetchit] had this fabulous jazz pianist, Herman Chittison, playing in his dressing room between shows ... Step helped Chittison get back to America, in return of which he became a slave of Step's ... About that time, there was a radio program called, 'Flashgun Casey, Crime Photographer' ... you'd always hear this tinkling piano in the background. It was Chittison... probably trying to earn enough money to escape the clutches of Stepin Fetchit."

In 1950 Chittison recorded his first album for Columbia Records, called Keyboard Capers. The following year, the label released an album that Chittison cut with guitarist Everett Barksdale and bassist Abie Baker as the Herman Chittison Trio.

In October 1959, Chittison arrived in Boston and was employed as the resident pianist at the Red Garter bar in the Lenox Hotel. He then moved to the Mayfair Lounge in Bay Village. His stay in Boston lasted two years in total. He also had a reoccurring role as the piano player in the Blue Note Bar on the radio series, Casey, Crime Photographer.

Chittison died in Cleveland in March 1967, at the age of 58.
