= Poplar Plains, Connecticut =

Census-designated place in Connecticut, United States

- Census-designated place
- Location within Connecticut Location within the United States
- Coordinates: 41°10′7″N 73°22′41″W
- Country: United States
- State: Connecticut
- County: Fairfield
- Town: Westport

Area
  - Total: 1.07 sq mi (2.78 km^{2})
  - Land: 1.07 sq mi (2.77 km^{2})
  - Water: 0.0039 sq mi (0.01 km^{2})
- Elevation: 100 ft (30 m)
- Time zone: UTC-5 (Eastern (EST))
  - Summer (DST): UTC-4 (EDT)
- ZIP Code: 06880 (Westport)
- Area codes: 203/475
- FIPS code: 09-61555
- GNIS feature ID: 2805091

Poplar Plains is a census-designated place (CDP) in the town of Westport, Fairfield County, Connecticut, United States. It occupies the northwest corner of the town and is bordered to the southwest by the city of Norwalk, to the northwest by the town of Wilton, to the northeast by the town of Weston, to the east by the Saugatuck River, and to the south by the Merritt Parkway.

As of the 2020 census, Poplar Plains had a population of 1,322.

Poplar Plains was first listed as a CDP prior to the 2020 census.

== Demographics ==
=== 2020 census ===
As of the 2020 census, Poplar Plains had a population of 1,322. The median age was 43.5 years. 28.5% of residents were under the age of 18 and 16.4% of residents were 65 years of age or older. For every 100 females there were 100.6 males, and for every 100 females age 18 and over there were 97.7 males age 18 and over.

100.0% of residents lived in urban areas, while 0.0% lived in rural areas.

There were 428 households in Poplar Plains, of which 44.4% had children under the age of 18 living in them. Of all households, 71.0% were married-couple households, 9.1% were households with a male householder and no spouse or partner present, and 16.1% were households with a female householder and no spouse or partner present. About 15.4% of all households were made up of individuals and 9.6% had someone living alone who was 65 years of age or older.

There were 451 housing units, of which 5.1% were vacant. The homeowner vacancy rate was 0.5% and the rental vacancy rate was 2.8%.

Racial composition as of the 2020 census
Race	Number	Percent
White	1,106	83.7%
Black or African American	7	0.5%
American Indian and Alaska Native	0	0.0%
Asian	97	7.3%
Native Hawaiian and Other Pacific Islander	0	0.0%
Some other race	6	0.5%
Two or more races	106	8.0%
Hispanic or Latino (of any race)	69	5.2%
