= South Park View, Kentucky =

- Unincorporated community
- Location of South Park View in Jefferson County, Kentucky

- Location within the state of Kentucky South Park View (the United States)
- Coordinates: 38°07′06″N 85°43′12″W
- Country: United States
- State: Kentucky
- County: Jefferson

Area
  - Total: 0.12 sq mi (0.32 km^{2})
  - Land: 0.12 sq mi (0.32 km^{2})
  - Water: 0 sq mi (0.00 km^{2})
- Elevation: 495 ft (151 m)

Population (2020)
  - Total: 0
  - Density: 0/sq mi (0/km^{2})
- Time zone: UTC-5 (Eastern (EST))
  - Summer (DST): UTC-4 (EDT)
- ZIP Code: 40219
- FIPS code: 21-72138
- GNIS feature ID: 2405492

South Park View is a former home rule-class city in Jefferson County, Kentucky, United States. The population was 0 at the 2020 census. The community was named for its location near South Park Hill, elevation 902 feet (275 m), the highest point in Jefferson County. It was the smallest incorporated city in the commonwealth of Kentucky and one of nine incorporated places in the U.S. that had no recorded population.

== History ==
South Park View incorporated as a city of the 6th class in April 1961. The city was a residential suburb until the expansion of the Louisville International Airport realigned runways and created noise levels that the Federal Aviation Administration considered "significant." During the 2000s, residents were relocated and an enterprise zone industrial park replaced much of the housing, resulting in a population loss for the city from 196 to 7 between the 2000 and 2010 censuses. The official population fell to 0 by the 2020 census. The city was dissolved in 2023.

== Geography ==
South Park View is located in southern Jefferson County. It is 11 miles (18 km) south of downtown Louisville and 4 miles (6 km) south of Louisville International Airport.

According to the United States Census Bureau, South Park View has a total area of 0.1 square mile (0.3 km^{2}), all land.

== Demographics ==
Historical population
Census	Pop.	Note	%±
1970	287		—
1980	248		−13.6%
1990	214		−13.7%
2000	196		−8.4%
2010	7		−96.4%
2020	0		−100.0%
U.S. Decennial Census

As of the census of 2000, there were 196 people, 67 households, and 56 families residing in the city. The population density was 1,734.7 inhabitants per square mile (669.8/km^{2}). There were 71 housing units at an average density of 628.4 per square mile (242.6/km^{2}). The racial makeup of the city was 100.00% White.

There were 67 households, out of which 32.8% had children under the age of 18 living with them, 70.1% were married couples living together, 7.5% had a female householder with no husband present, and 16.4% were non-families. 14.9% of all households were made up of individuals, and 10.4% had someone living alone who was 65 years of age or older. The average household size was 2.93 and the average family size was 3.18.

In the city, the population was spread out, with 24.0% under the age of 18, 8.2% from 18 to 24, 30.1% from 25 to 44, 26.0% from 45 to 64, and 11.7% who were 65 years of age or older. The median age was 39 years. For every 100 females, there were 98.0 males. For every 100 females age 18 and over, there were 96.1 males.

The median income for a household in the city was $51,563, and the median income for a family was $59,583. Males had a median income of $34,583 versus $23,250 for females. The per capita income for the city was $19,482. None of the families and 4.0% of the population were living below the poverty line.
