= Poplar Plains, Kentucky =

Unincorporated community in Kentucky, United States

- Unincorporated community
- Location within the state of Kentucky
- Coordinates: 38°21′39″N 83°40′28″W
- Country: United States
- State: Kentucky
- County: Fleming
- Elevation: 909 ft (277 m)
- Time zone: UTC-5 (Eastern (EST))
  - Summer (DST): UTC-4 (EDT)
- ZIP code: 41041
- Area code: 606
- GNIS feature ID: 501127

Poplar Plains is an unincorporated community in Fleming County, Kentucky, in the United States.

== History ==
A post office was established at Poplar Plains in 1823, and remained in operation until it was discontinued in 1926. Poplar Plains was incorporated in 1831.
