= Elizaville, Kentucky =

Census-designated place in Kentucky, United States

- Census-designated place
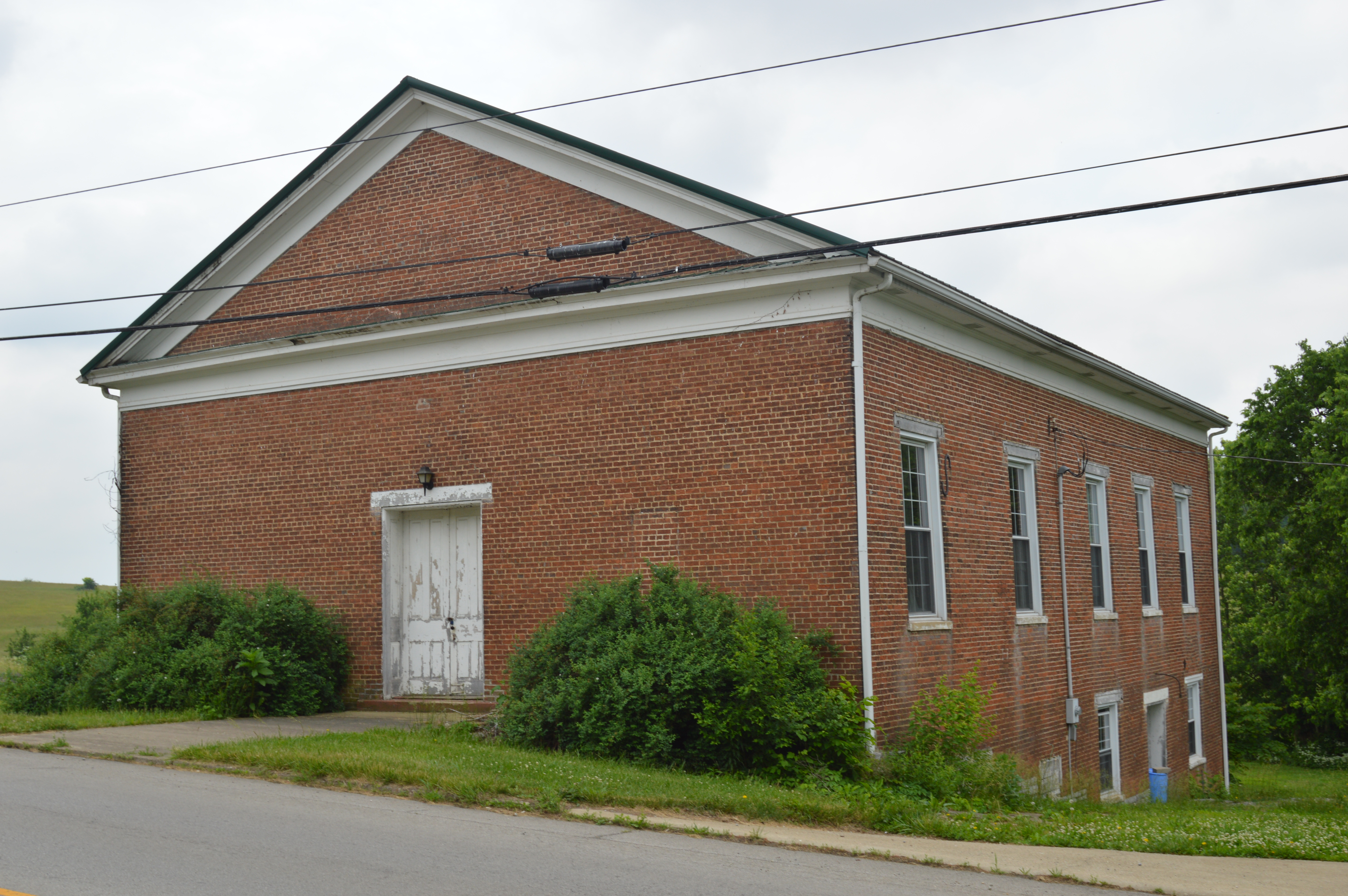
- The former Elizaville Presbyterian Church

- Location within Kentucky
- Coordinates: 38°25′00″N 83°49′27″W
- Country: United States
- State: Kentucky
- County: Fleming

Area
  - Total: 1.03 sq mi (2.66 km^{2})
  - Land: 1.03 sq mi (2.66 km^{2})
  - Water: 0.0039 sq mi (0.01 km^{2})
- Elevation: 922 ft (281 m)

Population (2020)
  - Total: 190
  - Density: 185.2/sq mi (71.49/km^{2})
- Time zone: UTC-5 (Eastern (EST))
  - Summer (DST): UTC-4 (EDT)
- ZIP code: 41037
- Area code: 606
- GNIS feature ID: 2629608

Elizaville is a census-designated place and unincorporated community in Fleming County, Kentucky, United States. As of the 2020 census, Elizaville had a population of 190. Elizaville is located at the junction of Kentucky Route 32 and Kentucky Route 170, 5 miles (8.0 km) west of Flemingsburg. Elizaville has a post office with ZIP code 41037.

== History ==
A post office was established in Elizaville in 1819. The community has the name of a daughter of an early citizen.

Historic sites in Elizaville include the Elizaville Presbyterian Church and Elizaville Cemetery.

== Demographics ==
Historical population
Census	Pop.	Note	%±
2020	190		—
U.S. Decennial Census
