= Nicholas County, Kentucky =

County in Kentucky, United States

- County
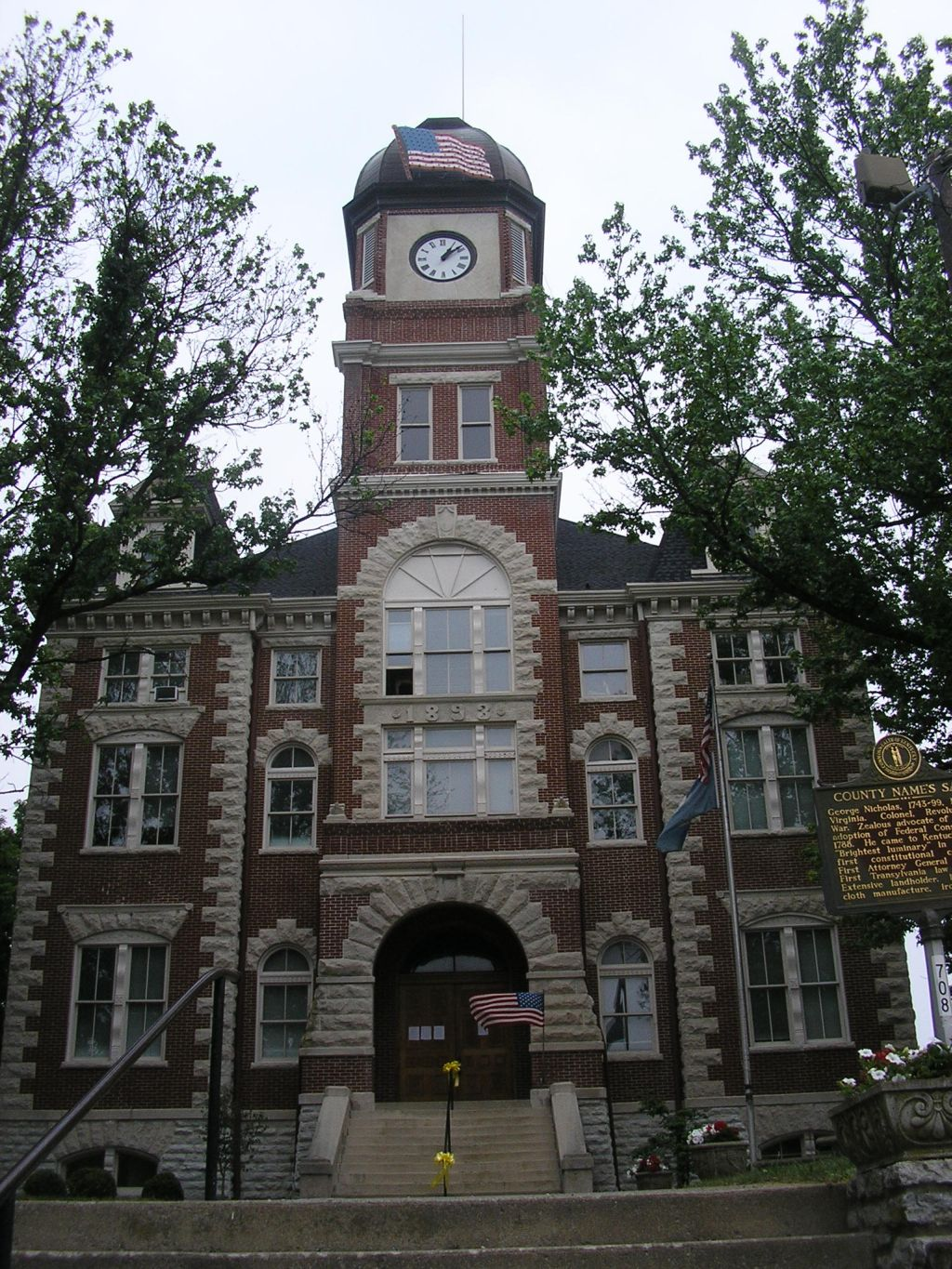
- Nicholas County courthouse in Carlisle

- Location within the U.S. state of Kentucky
- Coordinates: 38°20′N 84°01′W
- Country: United States
- State: Kentucky
- Founded: 1799
- Seat: Carlisle
- Largest city: Carlisle

Government
  - Judge/Executive: Steve Hamilton (D)

Area
  - Total: 197 sq mi (510 km^{2})
  - Land: 195 sq mi (510 km^{2})
  - Water: 1.7 sq mi (4.4 km^{2}) 0.8%

Population (2020)
  - Total: 7,537
  - Estimate (2025): 7,949 ▲
  - Density: 40.8/sq mi (15.8/km^{2})
- Time zone: UTC−5 (Eastern)
  - Summer (DST): UTC−4 (EDT)
- Congressional district: 6th
- Website: nicholascounty.ky.gov

Nicholas County is a county located in the U.S. state of Kentucky. As of the 2020 census, the population was 7,537. Its county seat is Carlisle, which is also the only incorporated community in the county. Founded in 1799, the county is named for Col. George Nicholas, the "Father of the Kentucky Constitution."

== History ==
Nicholas County was established in 1799 from land given by Bourbon and Mason counties. Nicholas was the 42nd Kentucky county in order of formation. The general region is known for its scenery, history, horse farms and hospitality. Nicholas County has a rural character and its countryside is typical of the Bluegrass belt with farms, wooded glades and small villages. Nicholas County is home to Forest Retreat, listed on the National Historic register as a historic district, built in 1814 by Thomas Metcalf the 10th Governor of Kentucky. The 1954 Kentucky Derby Winner “Determine” was bred and born in Nicholas County on the Forest Retreat Farm. Daniel Boone's last Kentucky home place is also located in Nicholas County, the Historic marker is located on US HWY 68 just past the traffic islands heading north. Built by Boone in 1795, Boone and his family resided in the one room cabin until 1799. Blue Licks Battlefield State Resort Park is a park located near Mount Olivet, Kentucky in Robertson and Nicholas counties. The park encompasses 148 acres (60 ha) and features a monument commemorating the August 19, 1782 Battle of Blue Licks. The battle was regarded as the final battle of the American Revolutionary War.

== Geography ==
According to the U.S. Census Bureau, the county has a total area of 197 square miles (510 km^{2}), of which 195 square miles (510 km^{2}) is land and 1.7 square miles (4.4 km^{2}) (0.8%) is water.

=== Adjacent counties ===
- Robertson County (north)
- Fleming County (northeast)
- Bath County (southeast)
- Bourbon County (southwest)
- Harrison County (northwest)

== Demographics ==
Historical population
Census	Pop.	Note	%±
1810	4,898		—
1820	7,973		62.8%
1830	8,834		10.8%
1840	8,745		−1.0%
1850	10,361		18.5%
1860	11,030		6.5%
1870	9,129		−17.2%
1880	11,869		30.0%
1890	10,764		−9.3%
1900	11,952		11.0%
1910	10,601		−11.3%
1920	9,894		−6.7%
1930	8,571		−13.4%
1940	8,617		0.5%
1950	7,532		−12.6%
1960	6,677		−11.4%
1970	6,508		−2.5%
1980	7,157		10.0%
1990	6,725		−6.0%
2000	6,813		1.3%
2010	7,135		4.7%
2020	7,537		5.6%
2025 (est.)	7,949	▲	5.5%
U.S. Decennial Census; 1790-1960 1900–90; 1990-2000 2010–20 2025

=== 2020 census ===
As of the 2020 census, the county had a population of 7,537. The median age was 41.9 years. 24.6% of residents were under the age of 18 and 18.7% of residents were 65 years of age or older. For every 100 females there were 97.7 males, and for every 100 females age 18 and over there were 96.2 males age 18 and over.

The racial makeup of the county was 95.2% White, 0.5% Black or African American, 0.2% American Indian and Alaska Native, 0.1% Asian, 0.0% Native Hawaiian and Pacific Islander, 0.9% from some other race, and 3.0% from two or more races. Hispanic or Latino residents of any race comprised 2.0% of the population.

0.0% of residents lived in urban areas, while 100.0% lived in rural areas.

There were 2,954 households in the county, of which 32.0% had children under the age of 18 living with them and 24.2% had a female householder with no spouse or partner present. About 27.9% of all households were made up of individuals and 13.2% had someone living alone who was 65 years of age or older.

There were 3,316 housing units, of which 10.9% were vacant. Among occupied housing units, 71.6% were owner-occupied and 28.4% were renter-occupied. The homeowner vacancy rate was 1.5% and the rental vacancy rate was 4.7%.

=== 2010 census ===
As of the census of 2010, there were 7,135 people, 2,809 households, and 1,956 families residing in the county. The population density was 35 per square mile (14/km^{2}). There were 3,261 housing units at an average density of 16 per square mile (6.2/km^{2}). The racial makeup of the county was 97.9% White, 0.6% Black or African American, 0.1% Native American, 0.2% Asian, 0.5% from other races, and 0.7% from two or more races. 1.4% of the population were Hispanic or Latino of any race.

There were 2,809 households, out of which 29.20% had children under the age of 18 living with them, 52.60% were married couples living together, 11.10% had a female householder with no husband present, 5.9% had a male householder with no wife present, and 30.40% were non-families. 25.60% of all households were made up of individuals, and 11.30% had someone living alone who was 65 years of age or older. The average household size was 2.51 and the average family size was 2.97.

In the county, the population was spread out, with 26.40% under the age of 19, 4.8% from 20 to 24, 25.50% from 25 to 44, 27.8% from 45 to 64, and 15.60% who were 65 years of age or older. The median age was 40.5 years. For every 100 females there were 93.70 males. For every 100 females age 18 and over, there were 89.30 males.

The median income for a household in the county was $40,259, and the median income for a family was $43,410. The per capita income for the county was $18,452. About 9.70% of families and 13.20% of the population were below the poverty line, including 14.20% of those under age 18 and 16.80% of those age 65 or over.

== Politics ==
United States presidential election results for Nicholas County, Kentucky
Year	Republican		Democratic		Third party(ies)	
Year	No.	%	No.	%	No.	%
1912	700	26.95%	1,611	62.03%	286	11.01%
1916	964	34.09%	1,829	64.67%	35	1.24%
1920	1,496	33.29%	2,953	65.71%	45	1.00%
1924	1,348	37.19%	2,235	61.66%	42	1.16%
1928	1,867	50.36%	1,836	49.53%	4	0.11%
1932	1,219	30.57%	2,728	68.41%	41	1.03%
1936	1,277	35.28%	2,325	64.23%	18	0.50%
1940	1,207	36.08%	2,124	63.50%	14	0.42%
1944	1,059	36.71%	1,813	62.84%	13	0.45%
1948	815	29.27%	1,885	67.71%	84	3.02%
1952	1,156	38.80%	1,819	61.06%	4	0.13%
1956	999	37.07%	1,667	61.86%	29	1.08%
1960	1,058	42.10%	1,455	57.90%	0	0.00%
1964	621	26.11%	1,742	73.25%	15	0.63%
1968	725	35.16%	911	44.18%	426	20.66%
1972	1,076	56.22%	804	42.01%	34	1.78%
1976	738	31.03%	1,582	66.53%	58	2.44%
1980	915	38.92%	1,349	57.38%	87	3.70%
1984	1,535	57.38%	1,107	41.38%	33	1.23%
1988	1,271	49.67%	1,242	48.53%	46	1.80%
1992	894	32.05%	1,341	48.08%	554	19.86%
1996	950	41.11%	1,092	47.25%	269	11.64%
2000	1,613	60.34%	994	37.19%	66	2.47%
2004	1,700	55.57%	1,332	43.54%	27	0.88%
2008	1,634	55.02%	1,272	42.83%	64	2.15%
2012	1,583	61.33%	948	36.73%	50	1.94%
2016	1,957	68.88%	787	27.70%	97	3.41%
2020	2,408	70.91%	955	28.12%	33	0.97%
2024	2,451	73.85%	824	24.83%	44	1.33%

The county voted "No" on 2022 Kentucky Amendment 2, an anti-abortion ballot measure, by 60% to 40%, and backed Donald Trump with 71% of the vote to Joe Biden's 28% in the 2020 presidential election.

=== Elected officials ===
Elected officials as of January 3, 2025
U.S. House	Andy Barr (R)	KY 6
Ky. Senate	Stephen West (R)	27
Ky. House	Matthew Koch (R)	72

== Communities ==
=== Cities ===
- Carlisle (county seat)

=== Unincorporated communities ===
- East Union
- Headquarters
- Hooktown
- Moorefield
- Myers

== Notable residents ==
- Barton Stone Alexander, born in Nicholas County, brigadier general in the American Civil War, designer of Fort McPherson
- Daniel Boone, moved to Nicholas County in 1795 after living in the Kanawha Valley, Virginia. Circa 1798, Boone moved to the mouth of the Little Sandy River at the site of present-day Greenup, Kentucky. Boone left Kentucky with his extended family for Missouri in 1799. While in Nicholas County, Boone lived on the Brushy Fork of Hinkston Creek in a cabin owned by his son Daniel Morgan Boone.
- Thomas Metcalfe (March 20, 1780 – August 18, 1855), also known as Thomas Metcalf or as "Stonehammer", was a U.S. Representative, Senator, and the tenth Governor of Kentucky. Following his political career, he retired to "Forest Retreat", his estate in Nicholas County, where he died of cholera in 1855. Metcalfe County, Kentucky was named in his honor.
- Author Barbara Kingsolver was raised in Carlisle, Nicholas County.
- Joseph Drake was born in Nicholas County. Drake was a lawyer, plantation owner, and Colonel in the Confederate States Army during the Civil War.
- David Rice Atchison (1807–1886) lived for a brief period in Nicholas County and holds the distinction of (possibly) being President of the United States for one day.

== See also ==
- National Register of Historic Places listings in Nicholas County, Kentucky
