= Fleming County, Kentucky =

County in Kentucky, United States

- County
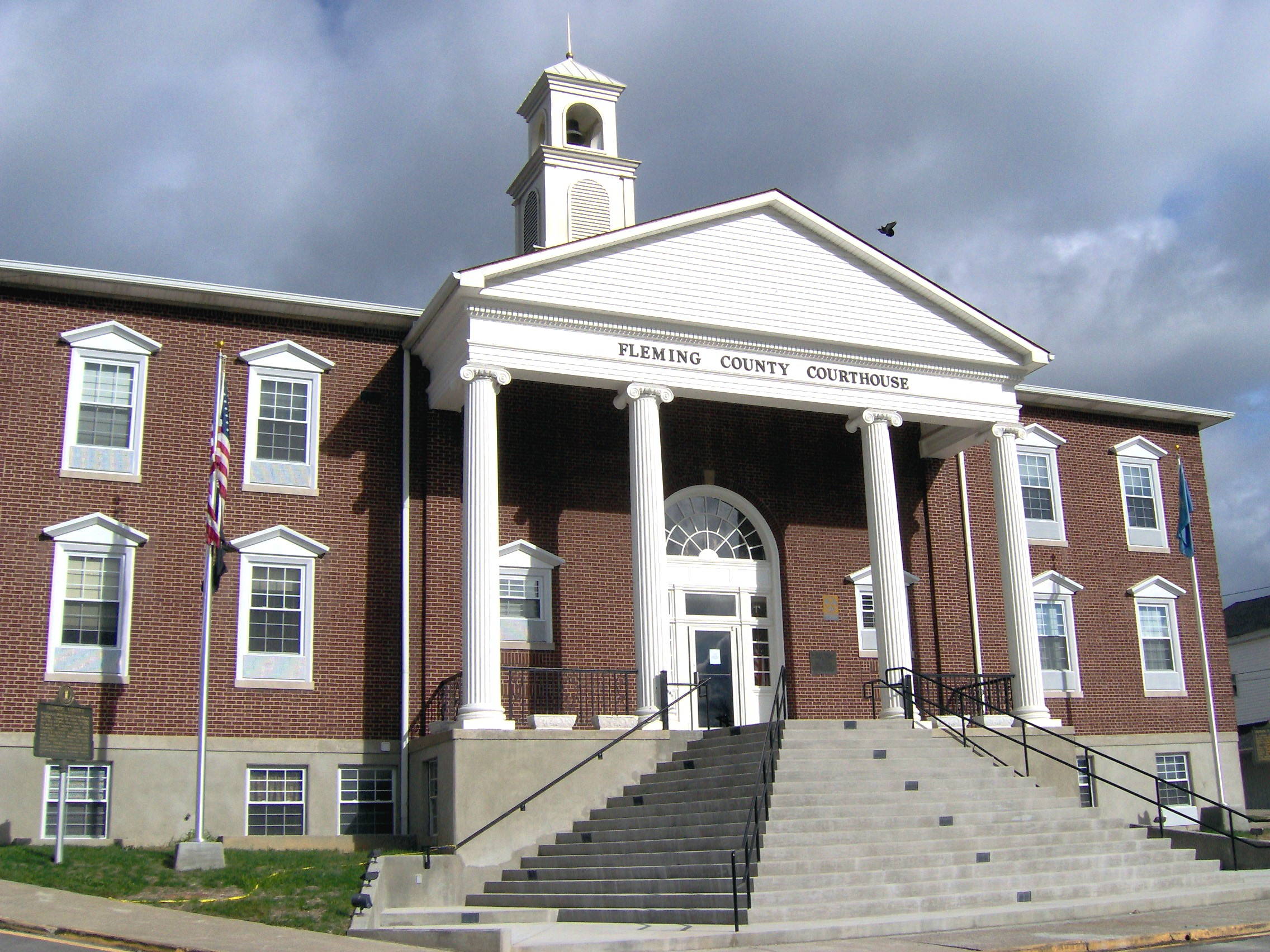
- Fleming County courthouse in Flemingsburg

- Location within the U.S. state of Kentucky
- Coordinates: 38°22′N 83°41′W
- Country: United States
- State: Kentucky
- Founded: 1798
- Named for: John Fleming (1735–1791), early settler of Kentucky
- Seat: Flemingsburg
- Largest city: Flemingsburg

Government
  - Judge/Executive: John Sims Jr. (R)

Area
  - Total: 351 sq mi (910 km^{2})
  - Land: 349 sq mi (900 km^{2})
  - Water: 2.8 sq mi (7.3 km^{2}) 0.8%

Population (2020)
  - Total: 15,082
  - Estimate (2025): 15,787 ▲
  - Density: 45.2/sq mi (17.5/km^{2})
- Time zone: UTC−5 (Eastern)
  - Summer (DST): UTC−4 (EDT)
- Congressional district: 6th
- Website: www.flemingkychamber.com

Fleming County is a county located in the U.S. state of Kentucky. As of the 2020 census, the population was 15,082. Its county seat is Flemingsburg. The county was formed in 1798 and named for Colonel John Fleming, an Indian fighter and early settler. It is a moist county. In 1998, the Kentucky General Assembly designated Fleming County as the Covered Bridge Capital of Kentucky.

== History ==
Fleming County was established in 1798 from land given by Mason County. The first courthouse, possibly built of logs, was replaced in 1830 and again in 1952.

== Geography ==
According to the United States Census Bureau, the county has a total area of 351 square miles (910 km^{2}), of which 349 square miles (900 km^{2}) is land and 2.8 square miles (7.3 km^{2}) (0.8%) is water.

=== Adjacent counties ===
- Mason County (north)
- Lewis County (northeast)
- Rowan County (southeast)
- Bath County (south)
- Nicholas County (west)
- Robertson County (northwest)

== Demographics ==
Historical population
Census	Pop.	Note	%±
1800	5,016		—
1810	8,947		78.4%
1820	12,186		36.2%
1830	13,499		10.8%
1840	13,268		−1.7%
1850	13,914		4.9%
1860	12,489		−10.2%
1870	13,398		7.3%
1880	15,221		13.6%
1890	16,078		5.6%
1900	17,074		6.2%
1910	16,066		−5.9%
1920	15,614		−2.8%
1930	12,931		−17.2%
1940	13,327		3.1%
1950	11,962		−10.2%
1960	10,890		−9.0%
1970	11,366		4.4%
1980	12,323		8.4%
1990	12,292		−0.3%
2000	13,792		12.2%
2010	14,348		4.0%
2020	15,082		5.1%
2025 (est.)	15,787	▲	4.7%

=== 2020 census ===
As of the 2020 census, the county had a population of 15,082. The median age was 41.5 years. 24.0% of residents were under the age of 18 and 18.6% of residents were 65 years of age or older. For every 100 females there were 98.4 males, and for every 100 females age 18 and over there were 97.2 males age 18 and over.

The racial makeup of the county was 95.4% White, 1.0% Black or African American, 0.2% American Indian and Alaska Native, 0.1% Asian, 0.0% Native Hawaiian and Pacific Islander, 0.8% from some other race, and 2.5% from two or more races. Hispanic or Latino residents of any race comprised 1.4% of the population.

0.0% of residents lived in urban areas, while 100.0% lived in rural areas.

There were 5,936 households in the county, of which 32.0% had children under the age of 18 living with them and 23.7% had a female householder with no spouse or partner present. About 26.9% of all households were made up of individuals and 13.2% had someone living alone who was 65 years of age or older.

There were 6,732 housing units, of which 11.8% were vacant. Among occupied housing units, 75.7% were owner-occupied and 24.3% were renter-occupied. The homeowner vacancy rate was 1.5% and the rental vacancy rate was 5.8%.

=== 2000 census ===
As of the census of 2000, there were 13,792 people, 5,367 households, and 3,966 families residing in the county. The population density was 39 people per square mile (15 people/km^{2}). There were 6,120 housing units at an average density of 17 per square mile (6.6/km^{2}). The racial makeup of the county was 97.33% White, 1.41% Black or African American, 0.14% Native American, 0.17% Asian, 0.28% from other races, and 0.67% from two or more races. 0.75% of the population were Hispanic or Latino of any race.

There were 5,367 households, out of which 34.80% had children under the age of 18 living with them, 60.30% were married couples living together, 9.60% had a female householder with no husband present, and 26.10% were non-families. 23.30% of all households were made up of individuals, and 11.00% had someone living alone who was 65 years of age or older. The average household size was 2.55 and the average family size was 2.99.

In the county, the population was spread out, with 25.40% under the age of 18, 8.40% from 18 to 24, 29.00% from 25 to 44, 23.90% from 45 to 64, and 13.40% who were 65 years of age or older. The median age was 36 years. For every 100 females there were 96.00 males. For every 100 females age 18 and over, there were 93.20 males.

The median income for a household in the county was $27,990, and the median income for a family was $33,300. Males had a median income of $26,463 versus $19,895 for females. The per capita income for the county was $14,214. About 14.80% of families and 18.60% of the population were below the poverty line, including 24.90% of those under age 18 and 20.10% of those age 65 or over.

== Politics ==
United States presidential election results for Fleming County, Kentucky
Year	Republican		Democratic		Third party(ies)	
Year	No.	%	No.	%	No.	%
1912	1,400	36.77%	1,915	50.30%	492	12.92%
1916	1,836	44.60%	2,240	54.41%	41	1.00%
1920	2,960	45.72%	3,488	53.88%	26	0.40%
1924	2,572	49.38%	2,590	49.72%	47	0.90%
1928	3,798	64.50%	2,086	35.43%	4	0.07%
1932	2,638	43.08%	3,442	56.21%	44	0.72%
1936	2,749	48.66%	2,879	50.96%	21	0.37%
1940	2,855	48.65%	2,999	51.11%	14	0.24%
1944	2,666	50.38%	2,612	49.36%	14	0.26%
1948	2,088	42.66%	2,722	55.62%	84	1.72%
1952	2,592	51.33%	2,446	48.44%	12	0.24%
1956	2,744	51.97%	2,519	47.71%	17	0.32%
1960	2,777	55.62%	2,216	44.38%	0	0.00%
1964	1,668	38.33%	2,678	61.53%	6	0.14%
1968	2,220	53.28%	1,406	33.74%	541	12.98%
1972	2,484	62.38%	1,455	36.54%	43	1.08%
1976	1,647	41.35%	2,317	58.17%	19	0.48%
1980	2,189	50.73%	2,051	47.53%	75	1.74%
1984	2,824	63.33%	1,616	36.24%	19	0.43%
1988	2,409	53.27%	2,086	46.13%	27	0.60%
1992	2,045	39.82%	2,257	43.95%	833	16.22%
1996	2,313	48.55%	1,913	40.16%	538	11.29%
2000	3,282	63.37%	1,813	35.01%	84	1.62%
2004	3,749	60.44%	2,406	38.79%	48	0.77%
2008	3,432	58.85%	2,279	39.08%	121	2.07%
2012	3,780	65.38%	1,911	33.05%	91	1.57%
2016	4,722	75.43%	1,348	21.53%	190	3.04%
2020	5,534	78.30%	1,474	20.85%	60	0.85%
2024	5,578	79.69%	1,334	19.06%	88	1.26%

=== Elected officials ===
Elected officials as of January 3, 2025
U.S. House	Andy Barr (R)	KY 6
Ky. Senate	Stephen West (R)	27
Ky. House	Matthew Koch (R)	72

== Communities ==
=== Cities ===
- Ewing
- Flemingsburg

=== Census-designated place ===
- Elizaville

=== Unincorporated communities ===
- Bald Hill
- Beechburg
- Blue Bank
- Colfax
- Concord
- Cowan
- Craintown
- Dalesburg
- Fairview
- Foxport
- Fox Valley
- Goddard
- Grange City
- Hillsboro
- Hilltop
- Johnson Junction
- Mount Carmel
- Muses Mills
- Nepton
- Pleasureville
- Plummers Landing
- Poplar Grove
- Poplar Plains
- Ringos Mills
- Sherburne
- Tilton
- Wallingford

== Notable residents ==
- Herman Chittison, jazz pianist
- Edward Alvin Clary, US Navy Medal Of Honor Recipient, March 23, 1910
- Willis A. Gorman, Union Army general during the American Civil War, member of U.S. House of Representatives for Indiana, and territorial governor of Minnesota
- Claiborne Fox Jackson, Pro-Confederate Missouri governor during the early part of the Civil War
- Woodie Fryman, former Major League Baseball pitcher, 2x All-Star, and member of the Montreal Expos Hall of Fame
- Alvin Saunders, United States senator from Nebraska
- Franklin Sousley, Iwo Jima flagraiser
- Andrew T. Wood, lawyer and politician

== See also ==
- Moist county
- National Register of Historic Places listings in Fleming County, Kentucky
