= Carlisle, Kentucky =

- City
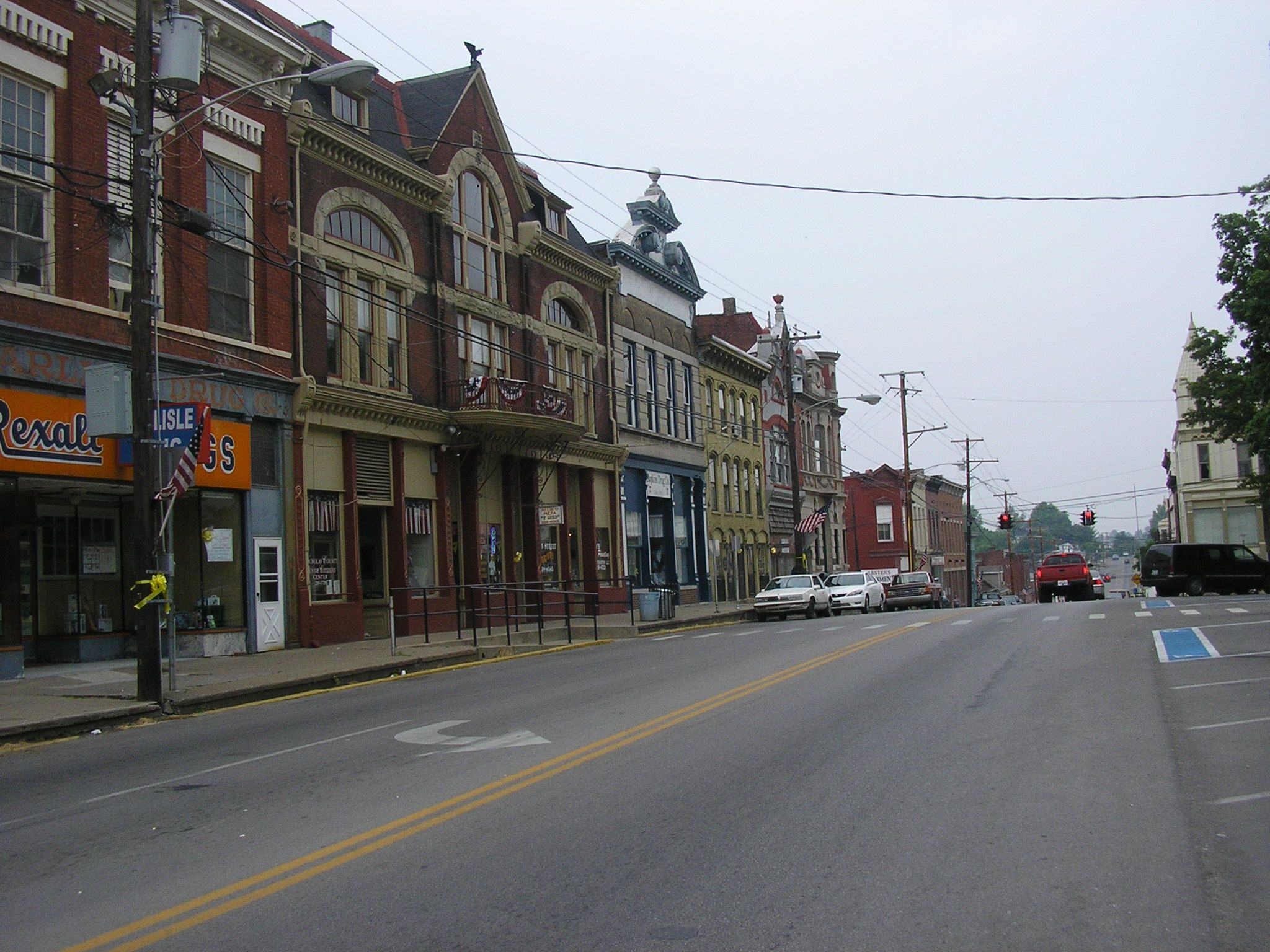
- Main Street in Carlisle

- Location of Carlisle in Nicholas County, Kentucky.
- Coordinates: 38°18′59″N 84°02′00″W
- Country: United States
- State: Kentucky
- County: Nicholas

Area
  - Total: 1.34 sq mi (3.46 km^{2})
  - Land: 1.33 sq mi (3.45 km^{2})
  - Water: 0.0039 sq mi (0.01 km^{2})
- Elevation: 906 ft (276 m)

Population (2020)
  - Total: 2,093
  - Estimate (2022): 2,148
  - Density: 1,571.7/sq mi (606.84/km^{2})
- Time zone: UTC-5 (Eastern (EST))
  - Summer (DST): UTC-4 (EDT)
- ZIP codes: 40311, 40350
- Area code: 859
- FIPS code: 21-12898
- GNIS feature ID: 2403995
- Website: carlisle.ky.gov

Carlisle is a home rule-class city in Nicholas County, Kentucky, United States. As of the 2020 census, Carlisle had a population of 2,093. It is the county seat of Nicholas County. It is located at the junction of Kentucky Route 32 and Kentucky Route 36, about halfway between Lexington and Maysville.

== History ==
Carlisle was founded in 1816 when John Kincart donated land to facilitate the relocation of the county seat from Ellisville, 5 miles (8.0 km) to the north. The Daniel Boone Cabin, ca. 1790s, is located in the town where Boone lived from 1795 to 1799.

== Geography ==
According to the United States Census Bureau, Carlisle has a total area of 1.3 square miles (3.4 km^{2}), all land.

== Demographics ==
Historical population
Census	Pop.	Note	%±
1860	360		—
1870	606		68.3%
1880	909		50.0%
1890	1,081		18.9%
1900	1,377		27.4%
1910	1,293		−6.1%
1920	1,569		21.3%
1930	1,469		−6.4%
1940	1,414		−3.7%
1950	1,524		7.8%
1960	1,601		5.1%
1970	1,579		−1.4%
1980	1,757		11.3%
1990	1,639		−6.7%
2000	1,917		17.0%
2010	2,010		4.9%
2020	2,093		4.1%
2022 (est.)	2,148		2.6%
U.S. Decennial Census

=== 2020 census ===
As of the 2020 census, Carlisle had a population of 2,093. The median age was 45.7 years. 20.5% of residents were under the age of 18 and 25.0% of residents were 65 years of age or older. For every 100 females there were 86.7 males, and for every 100 females age 18 and over there were 84.8 males age 18 and over.

0.0% of residents lived in urban areas, while 100.0% lived in rural areas.

There were 874 households in Carlisle, of which 30.4% had children under the age of 18 living in them. Of all households, 36.7% were married-couple households, 19.7% were households with a male householder and no spouse or partner present, and 34.3% were households with a female householder and no spouse or partner present. About 33.4% of all households were made up of individuals and 17.7% had someone living alone who was 65 years of age or older.

There were 958 housing units, of which 8.8% were vacant. The homeowner vacancy rate was 1.3% and the rental vacancy rate was 6.0%.

Racial composition as of the 2020 census
Race	Number	Percent
White	1,967	94.0%
Black or African American	35	1.7%
American Indian and Alaska Native	6	0.3%
Asian	0	0.0%
Native Hawaiian and Other Pacific Islander	0	0.0%
Some other race	25	1.2%
Two or more races	60	2.9%
Hispanic or Latino (of any race)	40	1.9%

=== 2010 census ===
As of the census of 2010, there were 2,010 people, 892 households, and 546 families residing in the city. The population density was 1,499.7 inhabitants per square mile (579.0/km^{2}). There were 1,040 housing units at an average density of 768.2 per square mile (296.6/km^{2}). The racial makeup of the city was 97.10% White, 0.8% African American, 0.3% Asian, 0.3% from other races, and 1.4% from two or more races. Hispanic or Latino of any race were 1.3% of the population.

There were 892 households, out of which 25.7% had children under the age of 18 living with them, 42.3% were married couples living together, 13.2% had a female householder with no husband present, and 38.8% were non-families. 35% of all households were made up of individuals, and 37.2% had someone living alone who was 65 years of age or older. The average household size was 2.25 and the average family size was 2.88.

In the city, the population was spread out, with 24.4% under the age of 19, 5.0% from 20 to 24, 24.3% from 25 to 44, 25.5% from 45 to 64, and 20.8% who were 65 years of age or older. The median age was 42.3 years. For every 100 females, there were 81.9 males. For every 100 females age 18 and over, there were 79.2 males.

=== Income and poverty ===
The median income for a household in the city was $34,112, and the median income for a family was $42,664.

== Education ==
Public Schools:

• Nicholas County Elementary School

• Nicholas County Middle School

• Nicholas County High School

Private Schools:

• New Beginnings Christian Academy

Public Library:

Carlisle has a lending library, a branch of the Nicholas County Public Library.

== Notable people ==
- Betty Blake, Steamboat preservationist.
- Daniel Boone, pioneer, folk hero
- Gatewood Galbraith, political activist
- Bela M. Hughes, pioneer
- Barbara Kingsolver, writer
- Robert T. McCowan, Ashland Oil Vice Chairman and UK Board Director
- Thomas Metcalfe, moved to a farm in Carlisle
- William F. Spurgin, US Army brigadier general, born in Carlisle
