= Flemingsburg, Kentucky =

- City
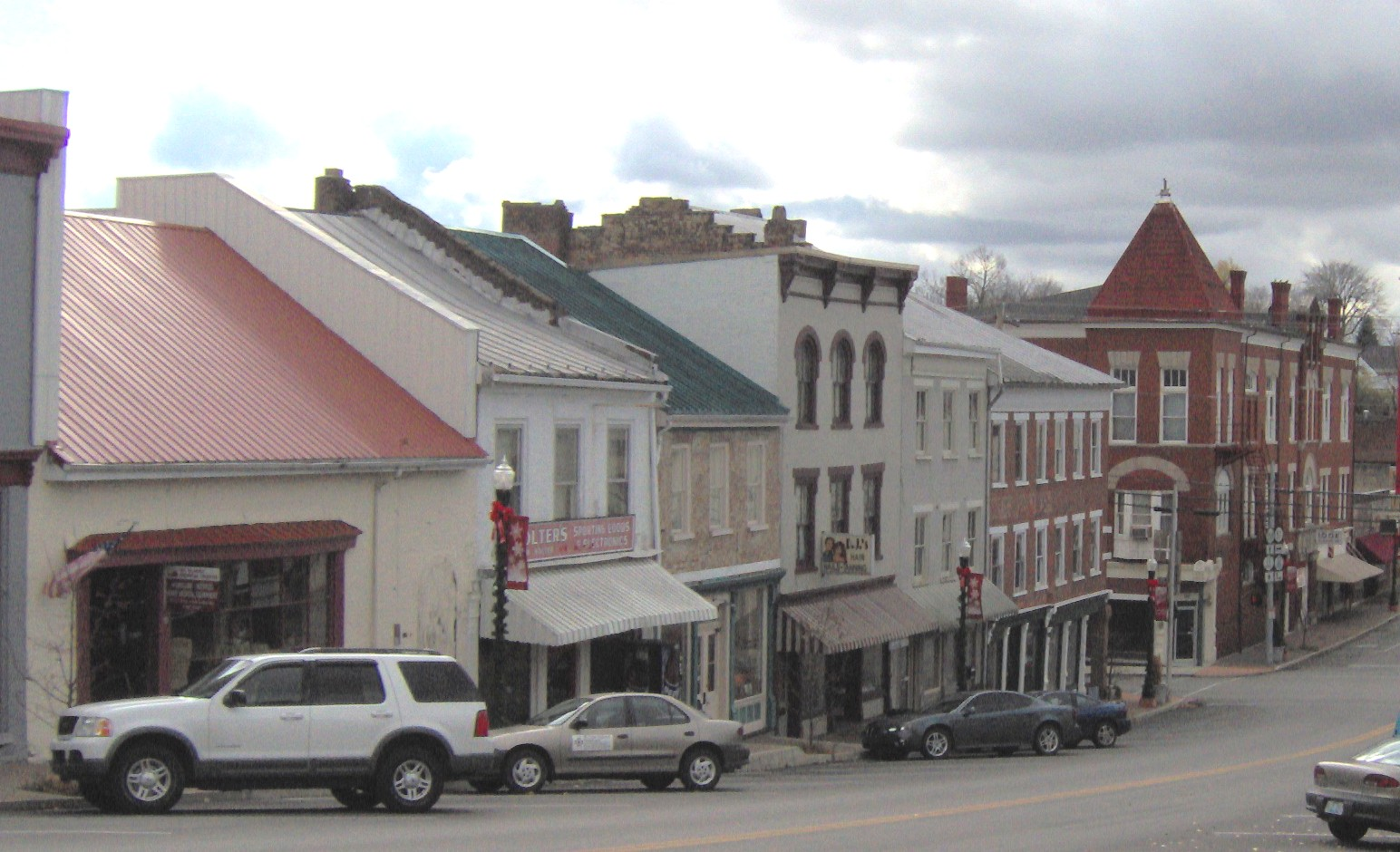
- Motto: "The friendly town that hospitality built"
- Location of Flemingsburg in Fleming County, Kentucky.
- Coordinates: 38°25′20″N 83°44′50″W
- Country: United States
- State: Kentucky
- County: Fleming

Area
  - Total: 2.70 sq mi (7.00 km^{2})
  - Land: 2.69 sq mi (6.97 km^{2})
  - Water: 0.012 sq mi (0.03 km^{2})
- Elevation: 814 ft (248 m)

Population (2020)
  - Total: 2,953
  - Estimate (2022): 2,969
  - Density: 1,097.3/sq mi (423.67/km^{2})
- Time zone: UTC-5 (Eastern (EST))
  - Summer (DST): UTC-4 (EDT)
- ZIP code: 41041
- Area code: 606
- FIPS code: 21-27856
- GNIS feature ID: 2403616
- Website: www.flemingsburgky.org

Flemingsburg is a home rule-class city in Fleming County, Kentucky, in the United States. The population was 2,953 at the 2020 census, up from 2,658 at the 2010 census. It is the county seat of Fleming County.

== Geography ==
Flemingsburg is located northwest of the center of Fleming County in northeastern Kentucky, 17 miles (27 km) south of Maysville, 31 miles (50 km) northeast of Mt. Sterling, and 38 miles (61 km) northeast of Paris.

According to the United States Census Bureau, Flemingsburg has a total area of 2.0 square miles (5.3 km^{2}), of which 0.01 square miles (0.02 km^{2}), or 0.33%, is water.

=== Climate ===
The climate in this area is characterized by hot, humid summers and generally mild to cool winters. According to the Köppen Climate Classification system, Flemingsburg has a humid subtropical climate, abbreviated "Cfa" on climate maps.

== History ==
Flemingsburg was founded in 1797 by George S. Stockton, a native Virginian, who named the town and county after his half-brother Colonel John Fleming. It has been the seat of Fleming County since its formation and was formally incorporated by the state assembly in 1812.

== Demographics ==
Historical population
Census	Pop.	Note	%±
1800	123		—
1830	648		—
1840	591		−8.8%
1850	759		28.4%
1870	425		—
1880	811		90.8%
1890	1,172		44.5%
1900	1,268		8.2%
1910	1,219		−3.9%
1920	1,562		28.1%
1930	1,265		−19.0%
1940	1,542		21.9%
1950	1,502		−2.6%
1960	2,067		37.6%
1970	2,483		20.1%
1980	2,835		14.2%
1990	3,071		8.3%
2000	3,010		−2.0%
2010	2,658		−11.7%
2020	2,953		11.1%
2022 (est.)	2,969		0.5%
U.S. Decennial Census

=== 2020 census ===
As of the 2020 census, Flemingsburg had a population of 2,953. The median age was 41.7 years. 22.3% of residents were under the age of 18 and 22.4% of residents were 65 years of age or older. For every 100 females there were 85.6 males, and for every 100 females age 18 and over there were 79.9 males age 18 and over.

0.0% of residents lived in urban areas, while 100.0% lived in rural areas.

There were 1,297 households in Flemingsburg, of which 30.8% had children under the age of 18 living in them. Of all households, 35.1% were married-couple households, 17.9% were households with a male householder and no spouse or partner present, and 38.7% were households with a female householder and no spouse or partner present. About 38.6% of all households were made up of individuals and 19.0% had someone living alone who was 65 years of age or older.

There were 1,478 housing units, of which 12.2% were vacant. The homeowner vacancy rate was 3.7% and the rental vacancy rate was 8.2%.

Racial composition as of the 2020 census
Race	Number	Percent
White	2,686	91.0%
Black or African American	100	3.4%
American Indian and Alaska Native	5	0.2%
Asian	4	0.1%
Native Hawaiian and Other Pacific Islander	3	0.1%
Some other race	54	1.8%
Two or more races	101	3.4%
Hispanic or Latino (of any race)	94	3.2%

=== 2000 census ===
As of the 2000 census, there were 3,010 people, 1,294 households, and 821 families residing in the city. The population density was 1,178.2 inhabitants per square mile (454.9/km^{2}). There were 1,434 housing units at an average density of 561.3 per square mile (216.7/km^{2}). The racial makeup of the city was 92.72% White, 5.05% African American, 0.10% Native American, 0.40% Asian, 0.43% from other races, and 1.30% from two or more races. Hispanic or Latino of any race were 1.03% of the population.

There were 1,294 households, out of which 29.3% had children under the age of 18 living with them, 45.5% were married couples living together, 14.8% had a female householder with no husband present, and 36.5% were non-families. 33.9% of all households were made up of individuals, and 18.2% had someone living alone who was 65 years of age or older. The average household size was 2.25 and the average family size was 2.87.

In the city, the population was spread out, with 23.3% under the age of 18, 7.9% from 18 to 24, 25.2% from 25 to 44, 23.2% from 45 to 64, and 20.5% who were 65 years of age or older. The median age was 41 years. For every 100 females, there were 81.3 males. For every 100 females age 18 and over, there were 74.1 males.

The median income for a household in the city was $23,708, and the median income for a family was $33,365. Males had a median income of $26,550 versus $21,165 for females. The per capita income for the city was $14,914. About 15.0% of families and 19.0% of the population were below the poverty line, including 23.5% of those under age 18 and 26.8% of those age 65 or over.

== Education ==
Flemingsburg has a lending library, the Fleming County Public Library.

== Notable people ==
- James J. Andrews, Civil War spy for the Union Army
- Landaff Andrews, United States Representative
- Herman Chittison, jazz musician
- Leander Cox, congressman from Kentucky
- Willis A. Gorman, Union Army general during the American Civil War, member of U.S. House of Representatives for Indiana, and territorial governor of Minnesota
- Joseph J. Reynolds, Union Army general
- Alvin Saunders, United States senator from Nebraska
- Mary Eulalie Fee Shannon (1824–1855), poet
- Franklin R. Sousley, one of six men who raised the second American flag on Mount Suribachi during the Battle of Iwo Jima
- Nelson Stacy, NASCAR and ARCA driver
- Lawrence S. Trimble, U.S. congressman from Kentucky
