= National Register of Historic Places listings in Mason County, Kentucky =

Location of Mason County in Kentucky

This is a list of the National Register of Historic Places listings in Mason County, Kentucky.

This is intended to be a complete list of the properties and districts on the National Register of Historic Places in Mason County, Kentucky, United States. The locations of National Register properties and districts for which the latitude and longitude coordinates are included below, may be seen in a map.

There are 41 properties and districts listed on the National Register in the county.

This National Park Service list is complete through NPS recent listings posted September 26, 2025.

== Current listings ==
	Name on the Register	Image	Date listed	Location	City or town	Description
1	Armstrong Row	Armstrong Row	March 1, 1984 (#84001818)	207-227 W. 2nd St. 38°38′59″N 83°46′08″W	Maysville	Within the larger Maysville Downtown Historic District
2	Bracken Baptist Church	Bracken Baptist Church	April 28, 1983 (#83002821)	County Road 1235; 38°42′22″N 83°55′08″W	Minerva	
3	Courthouse Square and Mechanics' Row Historic District	Courthouse Square and Mechanics' Row Historic District	May 12, 1975 (#75000803)	W. 3rd St. between Market and Sutton Sts. 38°38′50″N 83°45′59″W	Maysville	Within the larger Maysville Downtown Historic District
4	Cox-Hord House	Cox-Hord House	July 14, 1978 (#78001382)	128 E. 3rd St. 38°38′42″N 83°45′44″W	Maysville	
5	The Cox Building	The Cox Building	August 18, 2011 (#11000538)	2-8 E. 3rd St. 38°38′48″N 83°45′54″W	Maysville	
6	Richard Durrett House		March 5, 2018 (#100002158)	804 Clarks Run Rd. 38°37′37″N 83°49′30″W	Maysville	
7	Tom Forman House		January 8, 1987 (#87000170)	Off U.S. Route 62; 38°36′29″N 83°48′59″W	Washington	
8	Fox Farm		May 9, 1983 (#83002822)	Western side of Lees Creek, halfway between Mays Lick and the Licking River; 38°32′45″N 83°50′09″W	Mays Lick	
9	GAR Monument	GAR Monument	March 5, 2018 (#100002159)	Maysville-Mason County Cemetery, 1521 Forest Ave. 38°38′18″N 83°43′53″W	Maysville	
10	Gillespie Site (15MS50)		December 21, 1985 (#85003180)	Address Restricted	Mays Lick	
11	Helena United Methodist Church		February 3, 2010 (#09001311)	6479 Helena Rd. 38°29′50″N 83°45′51″W	Helena	
12	Lee House	Lee House	December 20, 1977 (#77000634)	Front and Sutton Sts. 38°38′56″N 83°45′59″W	Maysville	
13	Lee's Creek Covered Bridge	Lee's Creek Covered Bridge	March 26, 1976 (#76000923)	South of Dover on Tuckahoe Rd. off Kentucky Route 8; 38°45′01″N 83°52′44″W	Dover	
14	Mays Lick Consolidated School	Mays Lick Consolidated School	April 29, 1982 (#82002733)	U.S. Route 68 and Kentucky Route 324; 38°31′22″N 83°50′13″W	Mays Lick	
15	May's Lick Negro School	May's Lick Negro School	March 5, 2018 (#100002160)	5003 Raymond Rd. 38°31′05″N 83°50′19″W	Mays Lick	Rosenwald School which served black students from 1921 to 1960, when school segregation was ended
16	Maysville Downtown Historic District	Maysville Downtown Historic District	March 1, 1982 (#82002734)	Roughly bounded by McDonald Parkway, Front, Wall, Limestone and 3rd Sts.; also W. 2nd, Sutton, Market, Limestone, W. 4th & E. 4th Sts. 38°38′50″N 83°45′55″W	Maysville	Second set of addresses represent a boundary increase approved March 13, 2017
17	Maysville-Aberdeen Bridge	Maysville-Aberdeen Bridge	June 30, 1983 (#83002823)	Spans the Ohio River between Maysville and Aberdeen, Ohio; 38°39′19″N 83°45′27″W	Maysville	Extends into Brown County, Ohio
18	Milton Mills	Milton Mills	January 8, 1987 (#87000148)	7191 Taylor Mill Rd. 38°34′27″N 83°44′04″W	Orangeburg	
19	Ben Moran House	Ben Moran House	January 8, 1987 (#87000161)	Intersection of Kentucky Routes 8 and 10; 38°40′21″N 83°49′29″W	Moranburg	
20	Newdigate-Reed House	Newdigate-Reed House	October 10, 1975 (#75000804)	West of Maysville at the junction of Old U.S. Route 68 with U.S. Route 62; 38°38′43″N 83°46′37″W	Maysville	
21	Old Library Building	Old Library Building	August 30, 1974 (#74000895)	221 Sutton St. 38°38′54″N 83°46′01″W	Maysville	
22	Henry Perviance Peers House	Henry Perviance Peers House	December 21, 1998 (#98001486)	325 W. 3rd St. 38°38′58″N 83°46′15″W	Maysville	
23	Phillips' Folly	Phillips' Folly	August 10, 1978 (#78001383)	227 Sutton St. 38°38′51″N 83°46′03″W	Maysville	
24	Poague House	Poague House	January 8, 1987 (#87000210)	Parker Ln. 38°31′39″N 83°49′09″W	Mays Lick	Dry stone house built by future Kentucky Governor Thomas Metcalf
25	Pogue House	Pogue House	November 25, 2005 (#05001322)	716 W. 2nd St. 38°39′44″N 83°46′48″W	Maysville	
26	Point Au View	Point Au View	January 4, 1985 (#85000015)	721 Hillcrest Rd. 38°38′52″N 83°46′37″W	Maysville	
27	Pyles Site (15MS28)		April 5, 1984 (#84001821)	Address Restricted	Mays Lick	
28	John Brett Richeson House	John Brett Richeson House	July 22, 1994 (#94000733)	331 W. 3rd St. 38°39′03″N 83°46′20″W	Maysville	
29	Russell Theatre	Russell Theatre	March 31, 2006 (#06000216)	9 E. 3rd St. 38°38′48″N 83°45′53″W	Maysville	
30	Rust House		February 23, 1978 (#78001384)	South of Maysville on Kentucky Route 11; 38°32′24″N 83°45′10″W	Maysville	
31	Spring House at Flat Fork		October 6, 1987 (#87002051)	Kentucky Route 161; 38°29′48″N 83°49′43″W	Flat Fork	
32	Springhouse in Mays Lick	Springhouse in Mays Lick	October 6, 1987 (#87002052)	Off Kentucky Route 324; 38°31′04″N 83°50′11″W	Mays Lick	
33	Sroufe House	Sroufe House	February 12, 2016 (#16000010)	2471 Mary Ingles Hwy. 38°44′56″N 83°51′55″W	Dover	
34	Stone Barn on Lee's Creek	Stone Barn on Lee's Creek	January 8, 1987 (#87000200)	U.S. Route 68; 38°31′56″N 83°49′46″W	Mays Lick	
35	Valley Pike Covered Bridge	Valley Pike Covered Bridge	March 26, 1976 (#76000924)	West of Maysville off Kentucky Route 8; 38°40′27″N 83°52′20″W	Maysville	
36	Van Meter Site		December 5, 1985 (#85003040)	Address Restricted	Mays Lick	
37	Washington Historic District	Washington Historic District	January 21, 1970 (#70000253)	Roughly bounded by Hoppe St., Bartlett Lane, and city limits on the east and the west; also extending north and south along U.S. Routes 62 and 68; 38°36′50″N 83°48′28″W	Washington	Boundaries along U.S. Routes 62 and 68 represent a boundary increase
38	Washington Opera House	Washington Opera House	June 11, 1975 (#75000805)	116 W. 2nd St. 38°38′54″N 83°46′02″W	Maysville	
39	West Second Street District	West Second Street District	August 7, 2017 (#100001425)	W. 2nd, Rosemary Clooney & Short Sts., Rosemary, Shultz & unnamed Alleys. 38°39′04″N 83°46′16″W	Maysville	
40	West Fourth Street District	West Fourth Street District	November 7, 1974 (#74000896)	24, 29, 31, 32, 33 W. 4th St. 38°38′46″N 83°46′02″W	Maysville	Within the larger Maysville Downtown Historic District
41	Woodlawn		November 24, 1978 (#78001385)	South of Maysville on Kentucky Route 11; 38°35′23″N 83°45′58″W	Maysville	

== See also ==
- List of National Historic Landmarks in Kentucky
- National Register of Historic Places listings in Kentucky
