= Moran House =

Moran House may refer to:

== Places ==
=== Australia ===
- Moran House, a facility at St. Augustine's College (New South Wales), Brookvale, New South Wales

=== England ===
- House of Baron Moran, of Manton in the County of Wiltshire

=== United States ===
(by state)

- Ben Moran House, Moranburg, Kentucky, National Register of Historic Places listings in Mason County, Kentucky
- Thomas Moran House, East Hampton, New York, NRHP-listed home of painter Thomas Moran
- Knight-Moran House, near Franklin, Tennessee, NRHP-listed
- Moran-Moore House, Wharton, Texas, listed on the NRHP in Wharton County, Texas
- Moran Building, listed on the NRHP in Washington, D.C.
- Moran House (Washington, D.C.), built 1908, now Embassy of Pakistan, designed by George Oakley Totten Jr.
- Moran's Saloon, Beloit, Wisconsin, listed on the NRHP in Rock County, Wisconsin
- Moran Bay Patrol Cabin, Moose, Wyoming, NRHP-listed

== Businesses ==
- Mycroft & Moran, an imprint of Arkham House publisher
