= Milton Mills =

Milton Mills may refer to the following places in the United States:

- Milton Mills, New Hampshire, census-designated place
- Milton Mills (Orangeburg, Kentucky), listed on the National Register of Historic Places
- Milton Mills (vegan physician)
