= Mays Lick Consolidated School =

Historical school building in Kentucky

- U.S. National Register of Historic Places
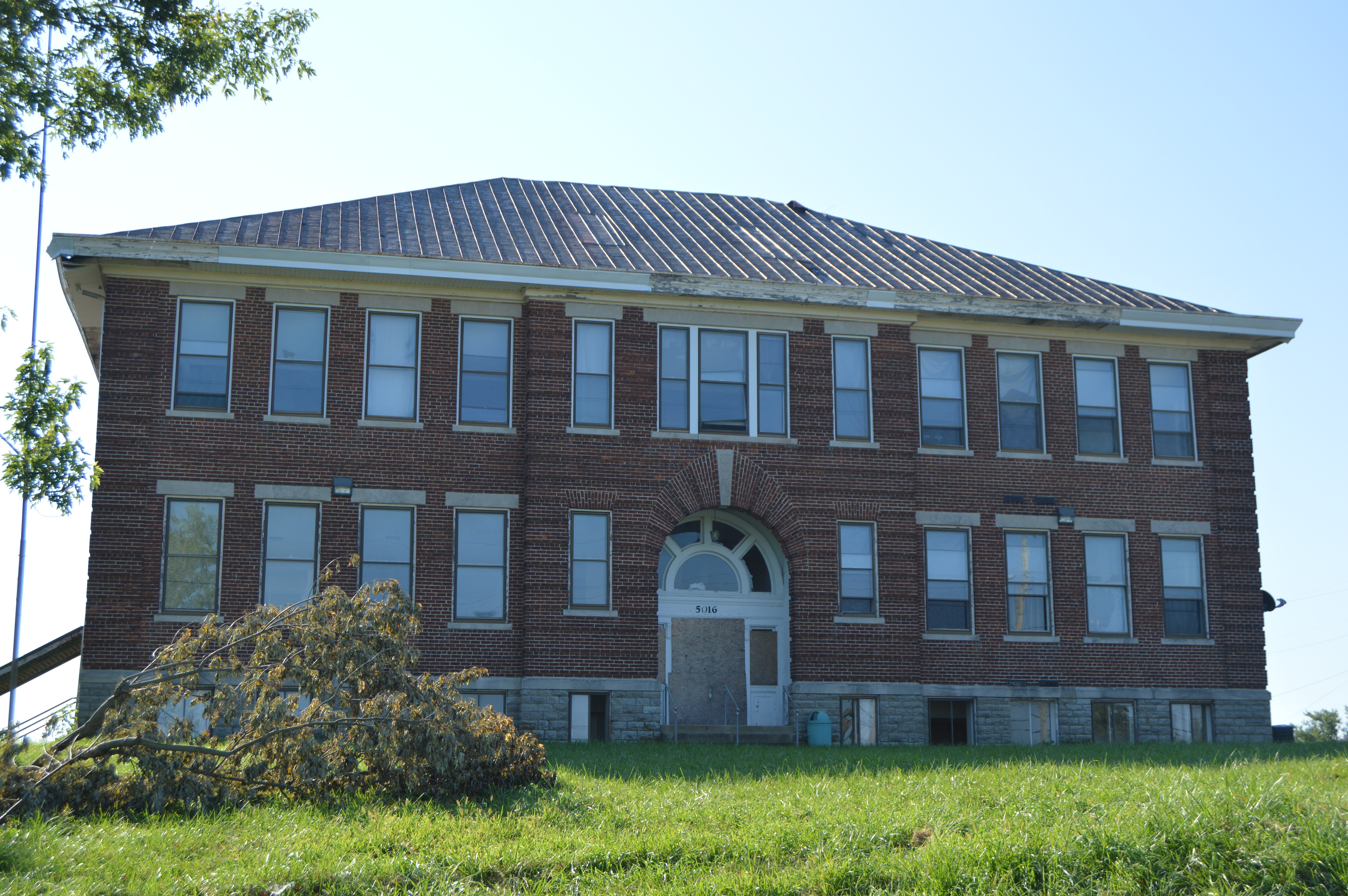

- Location within Kentucky Location within the United States
- Location: U.S. Route 68 and Kentucky Route 324, Mays Lick, Kentucky
- Coordinates: 38.522778°N 83.836806°W
- Area: 0.6 acres (0.24 ha)
- Built: 1909
- Built by: McCowell, Douglas
- Architect: Weber Bros.
- NRHP reference No.: 82002733
- Added to NRHP: April 29, 1982

The Mays Lick Consolidated School was the first high school in Mason County, Kentucky. It was built in May's Lick, Kentucky to serve students from seven separate lower schools.

It is an 88 by 63 feet (27 m × 19 m) two-story brick building facing northwest. It was listed on the National Register of Historic Places in 1982.

It was designed by Weber Bros. architects and was built by Douglas McCowell.

It served as a high school until 1960, after which only grades one through eight were offered. It served those grades until it was closed in 1981. It was then sold.

When listed on the National Register, the school building was being converted into apartments. An adjacent gymnasium building, built in the 1950s, was deemed non-contributing.

The school's main building was in fact remodeled, in 1981, into fifteen apartments, and the gymnasium became a post office. The apartment building was closed in 2013, when a sewage plant failed. The sewage plant had served the apartments, the post office, a gas station, and a doctor's office; it failed due to lack of routine maintenance and was discharging raw sewage into a creek.

In 2017 the vacant building was acquired by William Lawrence, of Lawrence Development and Rental Properties. In 2018, a first phase of renovations of the building, creating eight apartments, was completed.

It is located off U.S. Route 68 on 2517, which was the old U.S. Route 68 and also is or was Kentucky Route 324.

== See also ==
- Mays Lick Negro School, listed on the National Register in 2017
- National Register of Historic Places listings in Mason County, Kentucky
