= Old Library Building =

Old Library or Old Library Building may refer to:

== Ireland ==
- The Old Library building, which forms part of the Library of Trinity College Dublin

== United Kingdom ==
- Old Library, Bristol, a historic library building dating from 1740
- Old Library, Cardiff, previously the main public library for Cardiff, 1882–1988
- The Old Library, Liverpool, a former Andrew Carnegie library
- Old Library Building, one of the Newcastle University buildings at Newcastle University, Newcastle upon Tyne
- Old Library, Wrexham, Wrexham's former library from 1907

== United States ==
- Old Library Building (Tucson, Arizona), listed on the NRHP in Pima County, Arizona
- Old Library Building (Maysville, Kentucky), listed on the NRHP in Kentucky
- Old Library (Bryn Mawr College), formerly known as the M. Carey Thomas Library
- Old Library, West Chester, Pennsylvania, dating from 1902
- Old Library Building (Chattanooga, Tennessee), listed on the NRHP in Tennessee
- The Old Library, an alternative name for Battle Hall at the University of Texas at Austin
