= Charles D. Drake =

American politician (1811–1892)

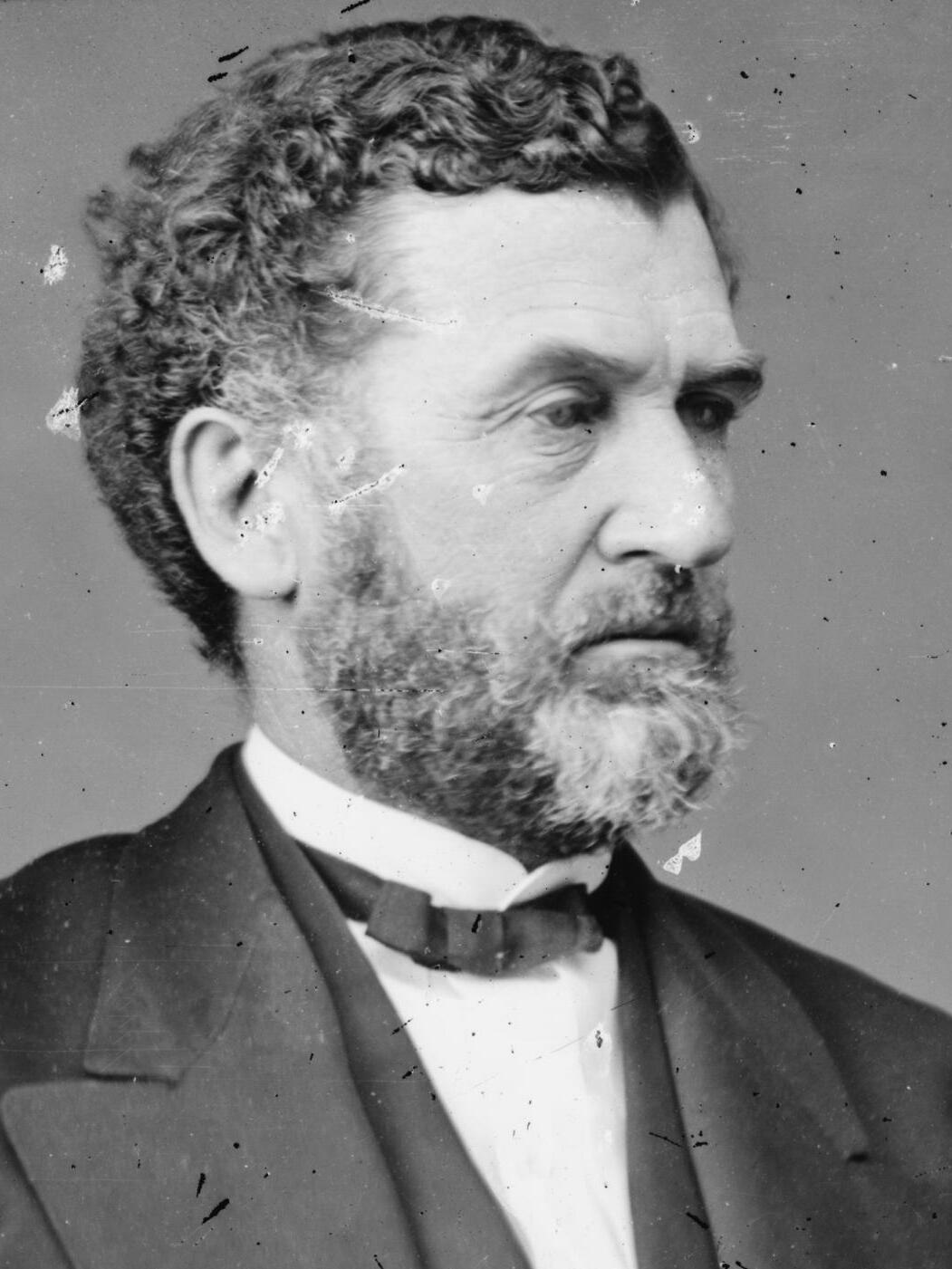

Chief Justice of the Court of Claims
- In office December 12, 1870 – December 12, 1885
- Appointed by: Ulysses S. Grant
- Preceded by: Joseph Casey
- Succeeded by: William Adams Richardson

United States Senator from Missouri
- In office March 4, 1867 – December 19, 1870
- Preceded by: Benjamin Gratz Brown
- Succeeded by: Daniel T. Jewett

Personal details
- Born: Charles Daniel Drake; April 11, 1811 Cincinnati, Ohio, U.S.
- Died: April 1, 1892 (aged 80) Washington, D.C., U.S.
- Resting place: Bellefontaine Cemetery; St. Louis, Missouri
- Party: Republican
- Parent: Daniel Drake (father)
- Relatives: Benjamin Drake (uncle)
- Education: St. Joseph's College; Partridge's Military Academy read law

Charles Daniel Drake (April 11, 1811 – April 1, 1892) was a United States senator from Missouri and Chief Justice of the Court of Claims.

Charles Drake was successively a Whig, a Know Nothing, and a Democrat.

== Education and career ==
Born on April 11, 1811, in Cincinnati, Ohio, Drake attended St. Joseph's College in Bardstown, Kentucky in 1823 and 1824, and Partridge's Military Academy in Middletown, Connecticut in 1824 to 1825. He was a midshipman in the United States Navy from 1827 to 1830. He read law with Benjamin Drake in Cincinnati. He entered private practice in Cincinnati from 1833 to 1834. He continued private practice in St. Louis, Missouri from 1834 to 1847, then returned to Cincinnati from 1847 to 1849. He was treasurer of the Board of Foreign Missions of the Presbyterian Church in 1849. He resumed private practice in St. Louis from 1850 to 1867. He was a member of the Missouri House of Representatives from 1859 to 1860. He was a delegate and Vice President of the Missouri constitutional convention in 1865.

== Leader of Radical Republicans ==
During the American Civil War, Drake became a fierce opponent of slavery, and a leader of the Radical Republicans. From 1861 to 1863, he proposed without success the immediate and uncompensated emancipation of slaves. He was defeated by the conservative Republicans led by Governor Hamilton Rowan Gamble and supported by President Abraham Lincoln. By 1863, Drake had organized his Radical faction and called for immediate emancipation, a new constitution, and a system of disfranchisement of all Confederate sympathizers in Missouri. He served as vice president of the 1865 state constitutional convention, where he stood out as the most active leader. Missouri German leader Carl Schurz commented about him, "in politics he was inexorable ... most of the members of his party, especially in the country districts, stood much in awe of him." The new Constitution was adopted and became known as the "Drake constitution." The Radicals maintained absolute control of the state from 1865 to 1871, with Drake as their leader. To maintain power, Drake and the Radical Republicans disfranchised every man who had supported the Confederacy, even indirectly. They made an 81-point checklists of actions. The United States Supreme Court reversed the imposition of the oath on ministers, and became a highly controversial political issue across the state. The German Republicans in particular were angry. To further bolster his voting base, he secured the franchise for all black men in Missouri, despite qualms held by many Republicans.

== Congressional service ==
Drake was elected as a Republican to the United States Senate and served from March 4, 1867, to December 19, 1870, when he resigned to accept a federal judicial position. He served as Chairman of the United States Senate Committee on Education for the 41st United States Congress.

== Federal judicial service ==
Drake was nominated by President Ulysses S. Grant on December 12, 1870, to the Chief Justice seat on the Court of Claims (later the United States Court of Claims) vacated by Chief Justice Joseph Casey. He was confirmed by the United States Senate on December 12, 1870, and received his commission the same day. His service terminated on December 12, 1885, due to his resignation.

== Later career and death ==
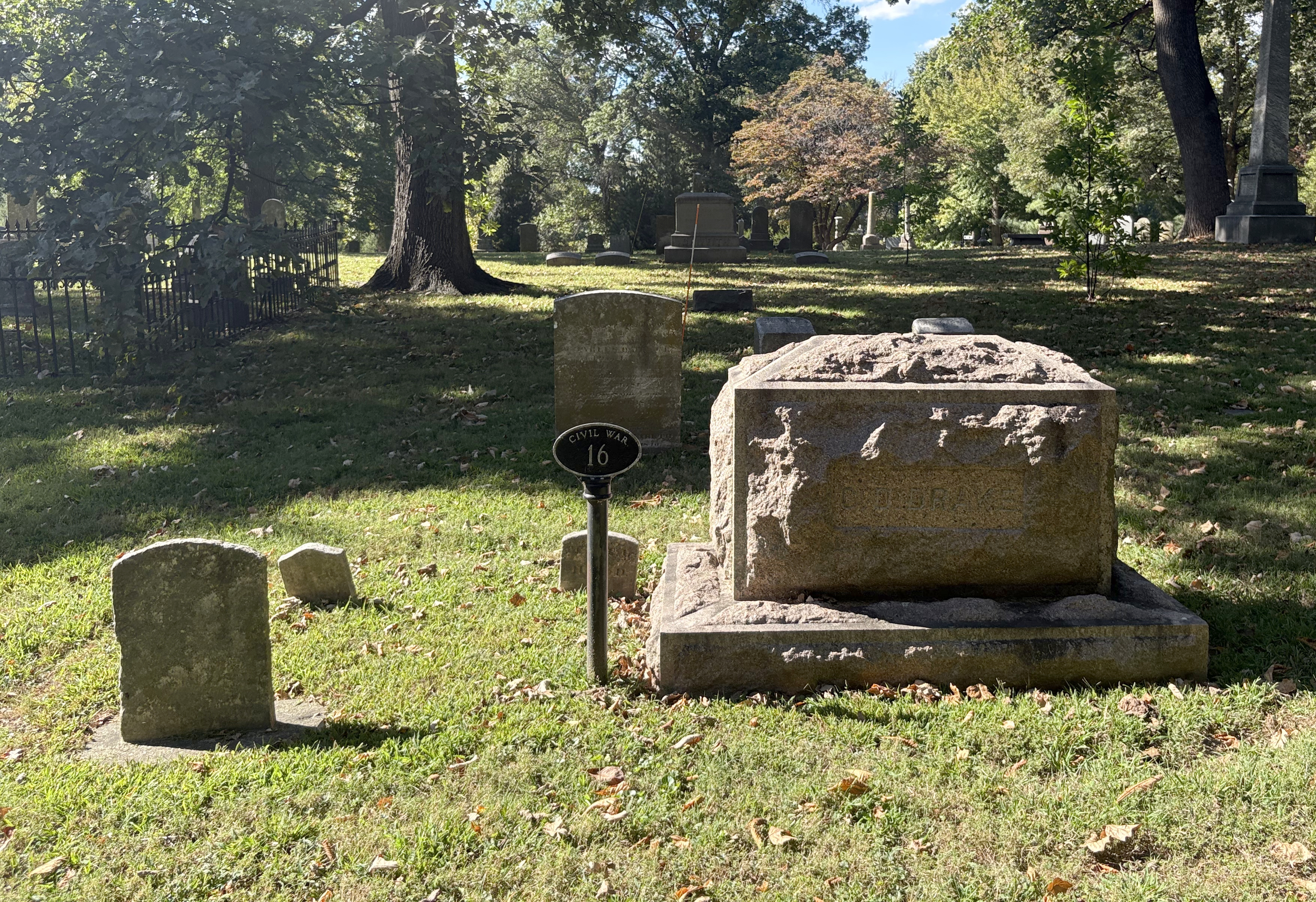
Drake's grave at Bellefontaine Cemetery

Following his resignation from the federal bench, Drake resumed private practice in Washington, D.C. from 1885 to 1892. He died on April 1, 1892, in Washington, D.C. His remains were cremated and the ashes interred in Bellefontaine Cemetery in St. Louis.

== Family ==
Drake's father, Daniel Drake (1785–1852), was an American physician and author. His uncle, Benjamin Drake (1795–1841), was an American historian, editor, and writer.

== Works ==
- Drake, Charles D. (1891). Treatise on the Law of Suits by Attachment in the United States (7th ed.). Boston: Little, Brown and Co. LCCN 14016517.
- Drake, Charles D. (1864). Union and Anti-Slavery Speeches. Cincinnati: Applegate & Co. LCCN 77083961.

U.S. Senate
Preceded by Benjamin Gratz Brown	U.S. senator (Class 3) from Missouri; 1867–1870; Served alongside: John B. Henderson, Carl Schurz	Succeeded by Daniel T. Jewett
Legal offices
Preceded by Joseph Casey	Chief Justice of the Court of Claims; 1870–1885	Succeeded by William Adams Richardson
