= Mays Lick, Kentucky =

Census-designated place in Kentucky, United States

- Census-designated place
- Location within Kentucky Location within the United States
- Coordinates: 38°31′01″N 83°50′42″W
- Country: United States
- State: Kentucky
- County: Mason
- Established: 1788

Area
  - Total: 0.64 sq mi (1.66 km^{2})
  - Land: 0.64 sq mi (1.65 km^{2})
  - Water: 0.0039 sq mi (0.01 km^{2})
- Elevation: 869 ft (265 m)

Population (2020)
  - Total: 252
  - Density: 394.8/sq mi (152.42/km^{2})
- Time zone: UTC-5 (Eastern (EST))
  - Summer (DST): UTC-4 (EDT)
- ZIP code: 41055
- Area code: 606
- FIPS code: 21-51006
- GNIS feature ID: 2629649
- Other names: Mayslick; Mays Spring; New Jersey Colony; William Mays Settlement

Mays Lick (a.k.a. Mayslick, originally known as May's Lick) is a census-designated place and unincorporated community in Mason County, Kentucky, United States. As of the 2020 census, it had a population of 252.

== History ==
May's Lick was founded in 1788 by six families from Scotch Plains, New Jersey:

1. Abraham Drake (1751–1805)
2. Cornelius Drake (1754–1833)
3. Isaac Drake (1756–1832), father of (i) Daniel Drake (1785–1852), American physician and author, and (ii) Benjamin Drake (1795–1841), American historian, editor, and writer; Daniel Drake's son, Charles Daniel Drake (1811–1892), was a United States Senator from Missouri and an anti-slavery politician
4. David Morris (1746–1798) and wife, Mary née Shotwell (1748–1806)
5. John Shotwell (1753–1826) and wife, Abigail née Shipman (1754–1835)

Abraham, Cornelius, and Isaac Drake were brothers, and John and Mary Shotwell were siblings.

The group purchased 1,400 acres (570 ha) of land from William May (for whom the community was named) near the salt lick in southern Mason County and began to build a community. The Mays Lick Post Office opened in 1800. Kentucky's first consolidated school and first school transportation – consisting of a horse and wagon – was founded in Mays Lick.

When May's Lick was founded (1788), Kentucky was part of the Commonwealth of Virginia. That same year, the Commonwealth of Virginia established Mason County. May's Lick became the name of the town after first being called May's Spring.

== Geography ==
Mays Lick is in southern Mason County, 12 miles (19 km) southwest of downtown Maysville. U.S. Route 68 runs along the eastern edge of the community, leading north to Maysville and to Ohio, and southwest 54 miles (87 km) to Lexington.

According to the U.S. Census Bureau, the Mays Lick CDP has a total area of 0.64 square miles (1.66 km^{2}), of which 0.002 square miles (0.005 km^{2}), or 0.31%, are water. The community is drained by several small streams that flow north to Lees Creek, a north-flowing tributary of the North Fork of the Licking River, which joins the Ohio River at Covington.

== Demographics ==
Historical population
Census	Pop.	Note	%±
2020	252		—
U.S. Decennial Census

== Mays Lick Consolidated School ==
The Mays Lick Consolidated School was constructed in 1909–1910 for $32,500 The building was the first high school in Mason County and until 1960, was the only public high school to serve the Mays Lick District. In 1982, the building was added to the National Register of Historic Places.

Also see: May's Lick Negro School

== The May family ==
The same May family for whom the Mason County Seat (Maysville) is named is also the namesake for May's Lick.

- Mays Lick is named after John's brother, William May.
- Maysville is named after John May ( –1790).

The May brothers

- George May ( –1795), a surveyor
- William May
- Charles May
- John May ( –1790)
- Gabriel May (1751–1813), married to Sallie Stokes (Susannah May Stokes, 1759–1815), niece of Ethan Allen (1738–1789), the hero of Ticonderoga and Crown Point

== Notable residents ==
- Joseph Desha (1768–1842), a congressman and the ninth governor of Kentucky
- Benjamin Drake (1795–1841), historian, editor, and writer
- Daniel Drake (1785–1852), physician, author
- John McLean (1785–1861), Associate Justice of the US Supreme Court from 1830 to 1861
- William McLean (1794–1839), Ohio legislator
- Charles Young (1864–1922), third African-American graduate of West Point, first black U.S. national park superintendent, first black man to achieve the rank of colonel in the US Army

== See also ==
- Fox Farm site (Mays Lick, Kentucky)
