= William Maclay Awl =

American politician

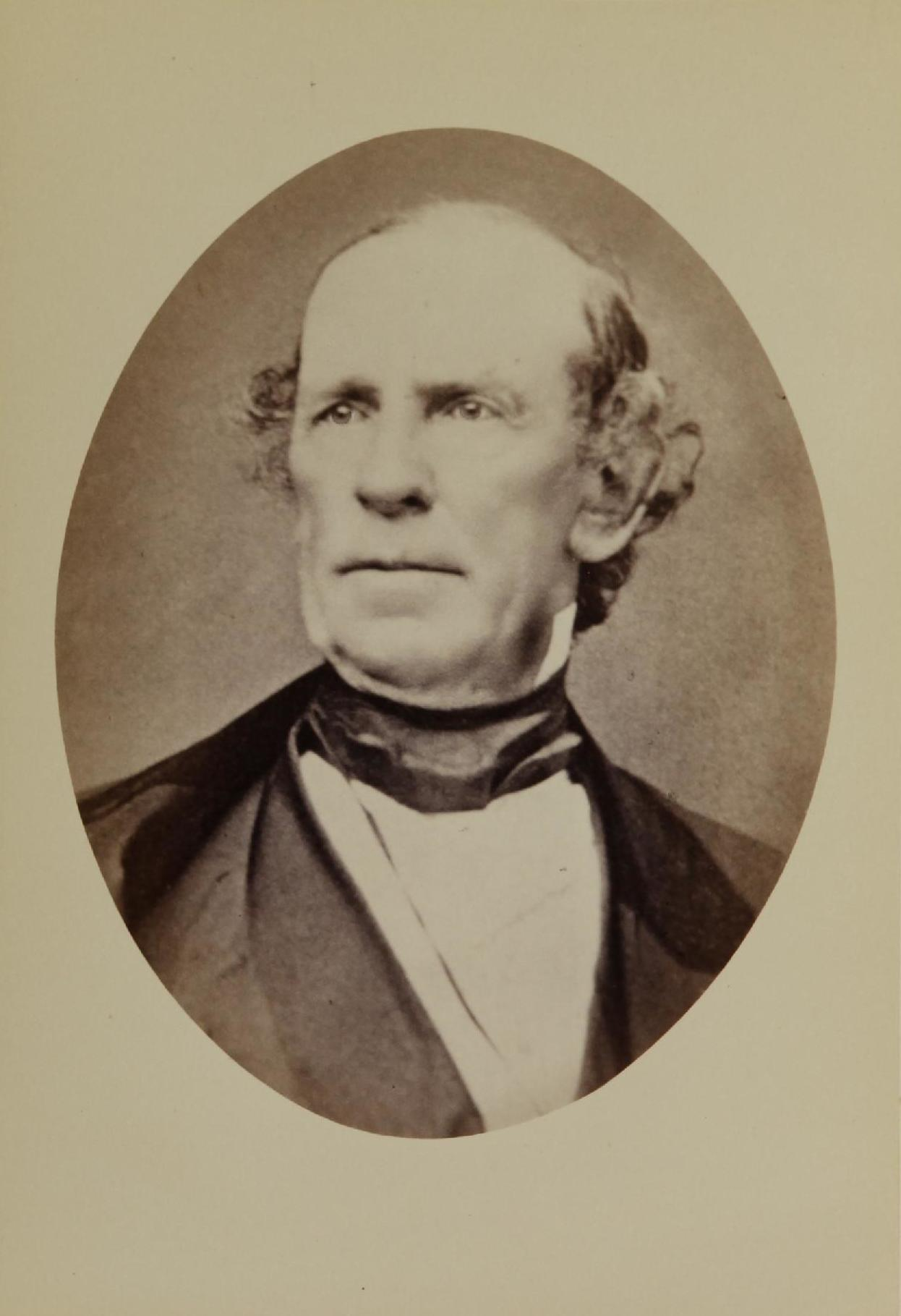
- Born: May 24, 1799; Harrisburg
- Died: November 19, 1876; Columbus

William Maclay Awl (May 24, 1799 – November 19, 1876) was a psychiatrist, a politician and a mental health hospital administrator.

== Biography ==
He was born in Harrisburg, Pennsylvania, to Mary (Maclay) Awl and lawyer and State Senator Samuel Awl. He studied basic medical concepts under a local physician. At age 20 he entered the medical department of the University of Pennsylvania. Failing to graduate, he began a temporary practice in his hometown, specializing in anatomy and surgery, but later accompanied a knapsacker to Lancaster, Ohio, in 1826. In 1830 he married Rebecca Loughey. He then practiced his profession in many towns within Ohio, but finally settled in Columbus, Ohio, in 1833 where he stayed for the rest of his life. He was the first surgeon west of the Allegheny Mountains to tie the left Common carotid artery.

In Columbus he quickly specialized in treating mental disorders and management of people suffering from insanity. He was once stated that if he could fix his eyes on those of even the most violent lunatic he could control him without difficulty, an accomplishment which he succeeded in doing several times. He was a common witness in court to cases of doubtful insanity. Both he and Marmaduke B. Wright were members of the Ohio General Assembly. Together they promoted a bill which later became law in 1835 in which Ohio insanity cases would come under the care of the state.

William Maclay Awl then was acting superintendent of the "State Hospital", which opened in 1838. Also in 1838 he was president of the Association of Superintendents of Asylums for the Insane of the United States and Canada. He held this position until 1851. He headed a bill which founded schools for the education of the blind and feeble-minded in Ohio. In addition, in 1846, he, Daniel Drake, and other leading members of his field to establish the Ohio State Medical Society.
