= Mays Lick Negro School =

- U.S. National Register of Historic Places
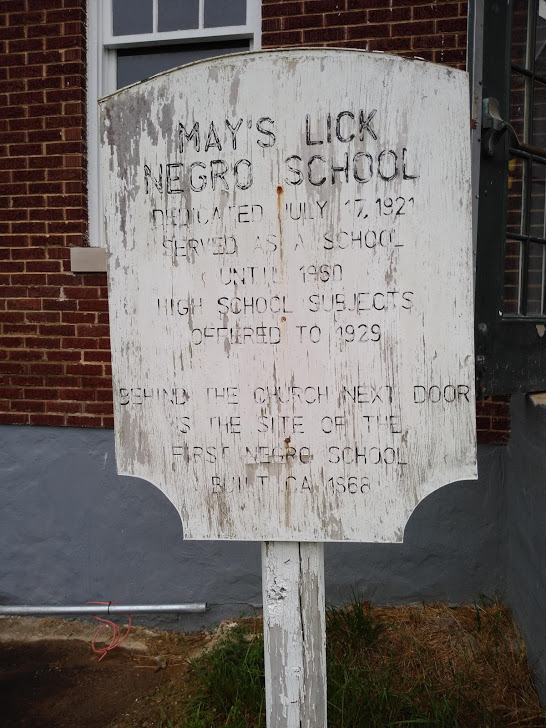
- Historical marker in front of schoolhouse

- Location within Kentucky
- Location: 5003 Raymond Rd. Mays Lick, Kentucky
- Coordinates: 38.51817°N 83.83848°W
- Area: 2 acres (0.81 ha)
- Built: 1921
- NRHP reference No.: 100002160
- Added to NRHP: 2018-03-05

Mays Lick Negro School is a former black school in May's Lick, Kentucky. The schoolhouse, which dates to the 1920s, has been declared a historic landmark. It was a Rosenwald School.

== History ==
After the American Civil War, the Freeman's Bureau was tasked with educating the newly freed black children. The Freeman's Bureau opened a school for black children in the May's Lick community ca. 1868. The location was behind the Second Baptist Church, near US 68 and Nicholas Street. A new schoolhouse was dedicated July 17, 1921. This school was constructed with help of the Rosenwald Fund. The school remained in operation until the early 1960s.

The square brick building with long windows has been added to the National Register of Historic Places in 2018. As of 2019, fund-raising efforts are being made to restore this building.

Its National Register nomination states baldly:

Mays Lick Negro School operated as a consolidated school for African Americans in Mason County Kentucky from the year it was built, 1920-1921, until Mason County ceased to segregate education racially, in 1960. It is significant all the years from 1920-1960 in the history of local education for showing the interest of the county's white citizens in keeping children in school from interacting racially.

The school's name appears in some official publications without the apostrophe as "Mays Lick".

== See also ==
- Mays Lick Consolidated School
- National Register of Historic Places listings in Mason County, Kentucky
