= Henry Perviance Peers House =

Historic house in Kentucky, United States

- U.S. National Register of Historic Places
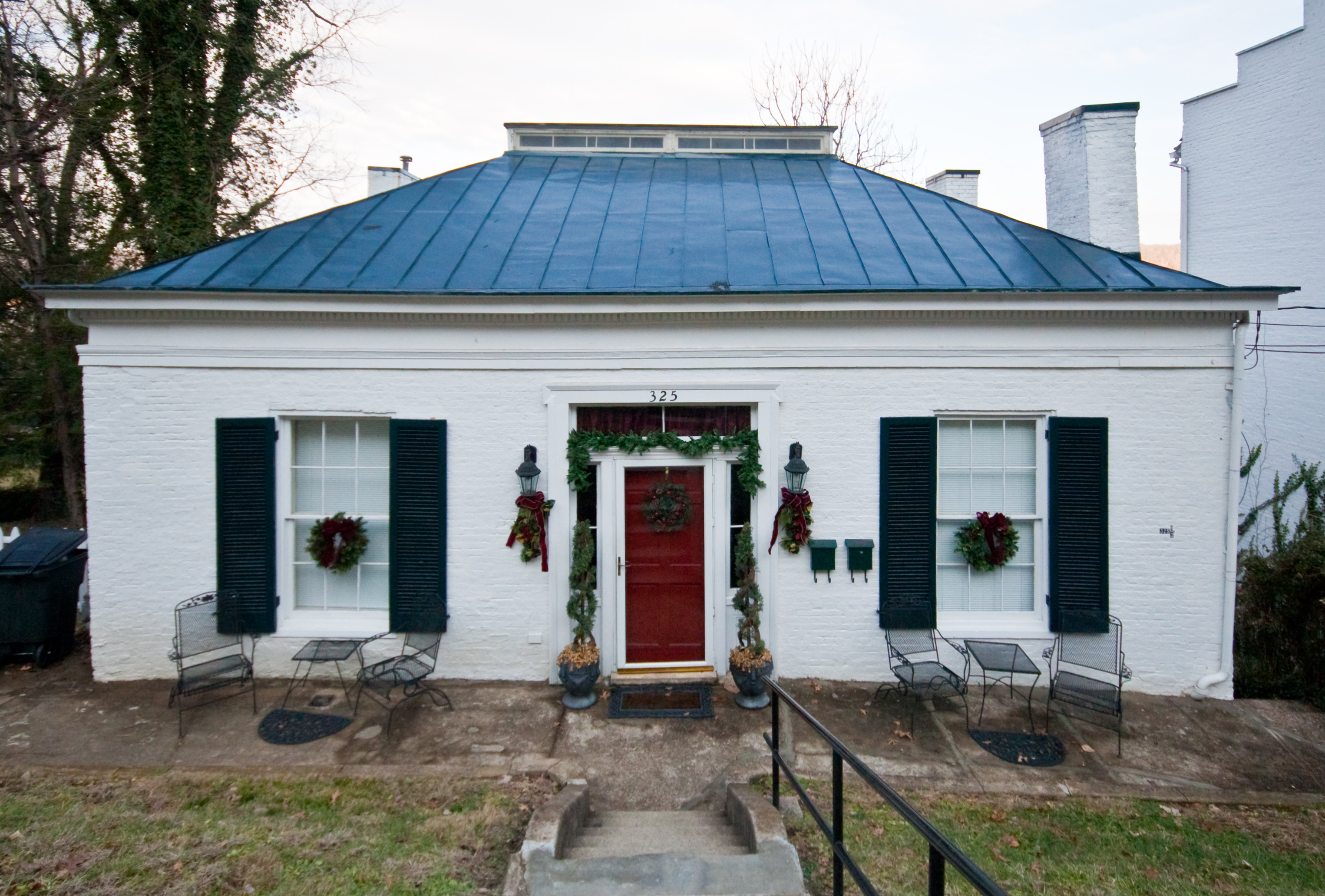

- Location within Kentucky Location within the United States
- Location: 325 W. 3rd St., Maysville, Kentucky
- Coordinates: 38°38′58″N 83°46′15″W
- Built: 1841
- Architectural style: Greek Revival
- NRHP reference No.: 98001486
- Added to NRHP: December 21, 1998

The Henry Perviance Peers House is a rectangular, two-story painted brick house in Maysville, Kentucky overlooking the Ohio River. The structure has a moderately pitched standing-seam hipped roof with a flat center section. There are four chimneys extending from the roof line, and the flat portion of the hipped roof has an unusual framed clerestory window that provides ventilation and natural light to the attic room. It is built into the hillside such that the northern face is two-story while the southern face is single-story.

Henry Peers (1807–1846) was employed during the early 1840s as a general agent for the Maysville Eagle Newspaper, traveling to the larger towns in Kentucky to expand the subscription base and gather news. He began taking notes on the Kentucky history he gathered in the course of his work with the intent to author a Gazetteer for the state but died in March 1846 before publishing it. He left a 250-page manuscript of narrative and statistics that was used by his employer and brother-in-law, Lewis Collins, as the basis for a history of Kentucky.

Peers was the son of Major Valentine Peers, born in Ireland and a veteran of the American Revolution. Major Peers moved to Maysville in 1803 and became one of the area's most successful pioneer industrialists.
