= Newdigate-Reed House =

Historic house in Kentucky, United States

- U.S. National Register of Historic Places
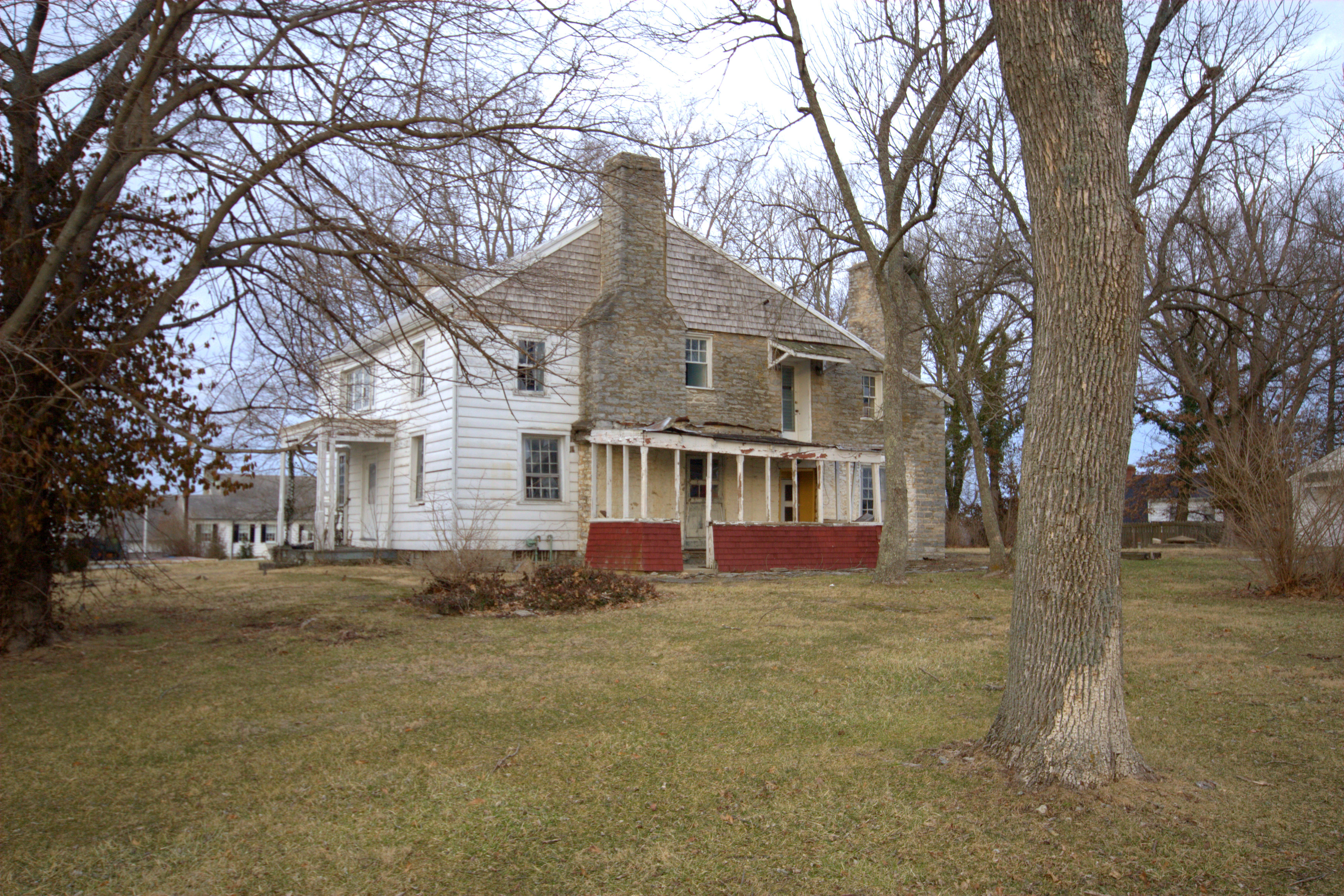

- Location within Kentucky Location within the United States
- Location: West of Maysville at the junction of old KY 68 and U.S. Route 62
- Nearest city: Maysville, Ky
- Coordinates: 38°38′43″N 83°46′37″W
- Built: Unknown
- Architectural style: Log cabin
- NRHP reference No.: 75000804
- Added to NRHP: October 10, 1975

The Newdigate-Reed House is a two-story log house built by the Newdigate family at the top of the hill near the Lexington-Maysville Turnpike. John Newdigate, a farmer, is listed as the landowner in 1854. Situated at the top of a steep hill leading out of Maysville, the house served as a convenient rest stop for merchants and wagon masters hauling goods from the docks at Maysville to points south.

Siding was applied to the log structure in the 1930s. The structure is asymmetrical with four windows on the upper story left side, one on the right side, and one to the right of the first floor entrance. The doorway with a one-story portico is slightly off-center. Stone chimneys on either end of the house are original.

The building was purchased by the Bierbower family in the late 19th century and sold to Stanley Forman Reed in 1910, Reed having just completed his law studies at a number of universities, including Yale University, the University of Virginia, Columbia University and the University of Paris.

The future supreme court justice began the practice of law in Maysville in 1910 with the law firm of Worthington, Browning and Reed. Reed served as a Kentucky state representative between 1912 and 1916, sponsoring child labor and workman's compensation bills that were enacted in the face of significant opposition.

Although a Democrat, Reed was appointed by President Herbert Hoover to serve as general counsel of the Federal Farm Board in 1929. In 1935, President Franklin D. Roosevelt appointed Reed Solicitor General of the United States to defend the New Deal laws whose constitutionality had been challenged. Reed was successful in doing so. In 1938, Reed was nominated to fill the U.S. Supreme Court vacancy caused by the retirement of Justice George Sutherland. Reed was widely considered the best lawyer in government service and his nomination was unanimously confirmed by the Senate.
