= Pogue House =

Historic house in Kentucky, United States

- U.S. National Register of Historic Places
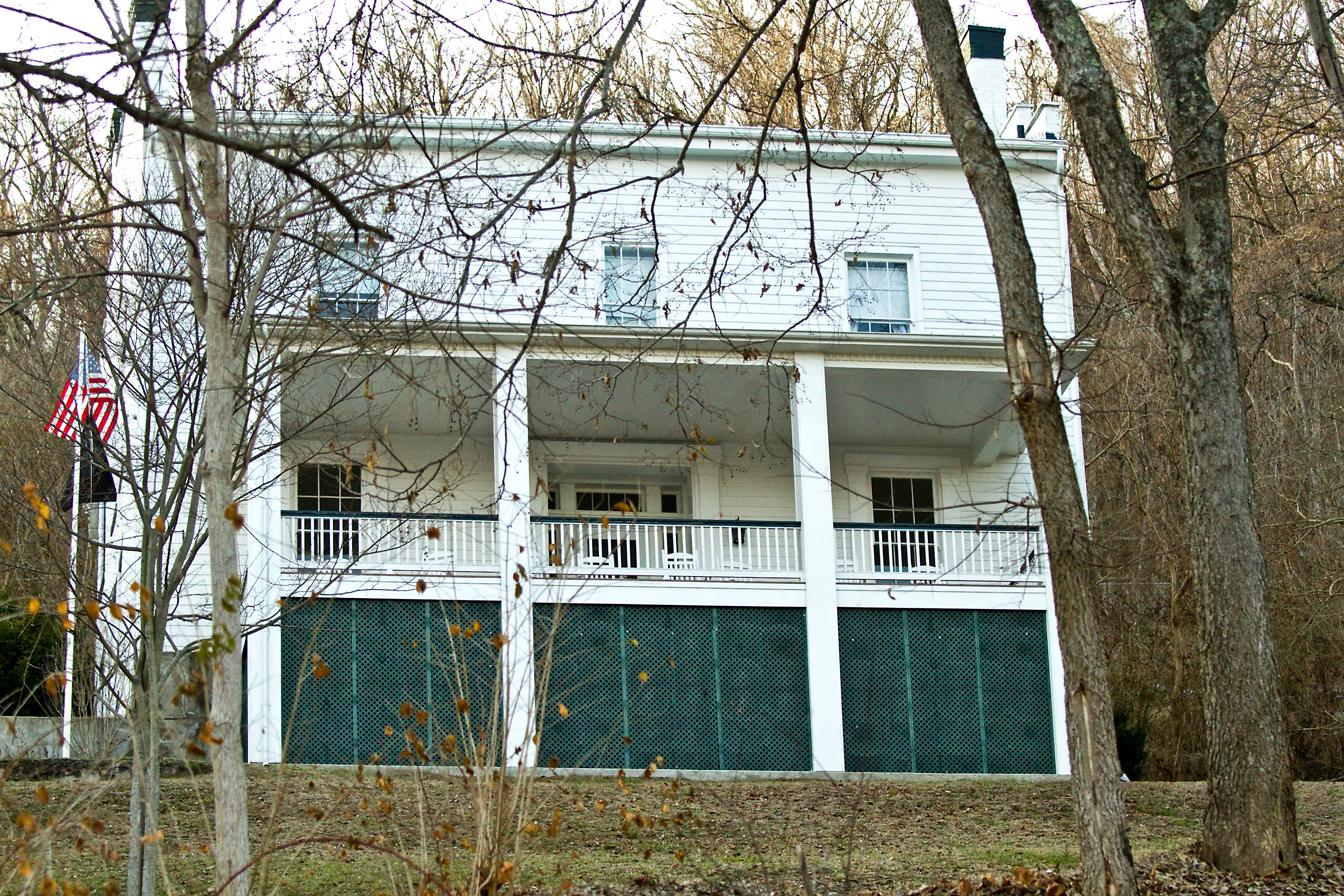

- Location within Kentucky Location within the United States
- Location: 716 W. 2nd St., Maysville, Kentucky
- Coordinates: 38°39′42″N 83°46′47″W
- Area: 3.0 acres (1.2 ha)
- Built: 1845
- Architectural style: Greek Revival
- NRHP reference No.: 05001322
- Added to NRHP: November 25, 2005

The Pogue House is a historic house in Maysville, Kentucky. It was built in 1845 on a fifteen-acre lot for industrialist Michael Ryan. The property was named "Riverside" by Ryan since it sits on a hillside with a sweeping ten-mile (16 km) vista of the Ohio River. The property was subdivided in 1955 and the historic portion currently comprises three acres. The Greek Revival floor plan includes three stories of living space two rooms wide and two rooms deep with a center hall plus a partial basement. The brick structure with an ashlar limestone foundation was one of the largest Kentucky residences in 1845 with 4,850 square feet (451 m^{2}) of living space.

The residence was purchased by Henry E. Pogue II and significantly upgraded circa 1890. Improvements included the installation of three sets of pocket doors and quarter sawn flooring on the first level. One of the first bathrooms in Mason County was installed on the second floor. The porch was replaced by a 42 ft (13 m). x 18 ft. roofed stone and tile terrace. The terrace deteriorated over time and was eventually demolished.

Henry Pogue was a distiller who opened the H. E. Pogue Distillery in 1876 near the residence his son would later purchase. The distillery was a large scale operation which could produce up to 2,000 gallons of whiskey per day and carried a normal inventory of 15,000 barrels of aging whiskey. At its peak, distillery employment was more than 100. Popular brands around the start of the 20th century included "Old Time" Sour Mash Pure Whiskey and "Belle of Maysville" Fire Copper Whiskey. Henry E. Pogue II ran the distillery until his death in 1918 in a distillery accident.
