= Phillips' Folly =

Historic house in Kentucky, United States

- U.S. National Register of Historic Places
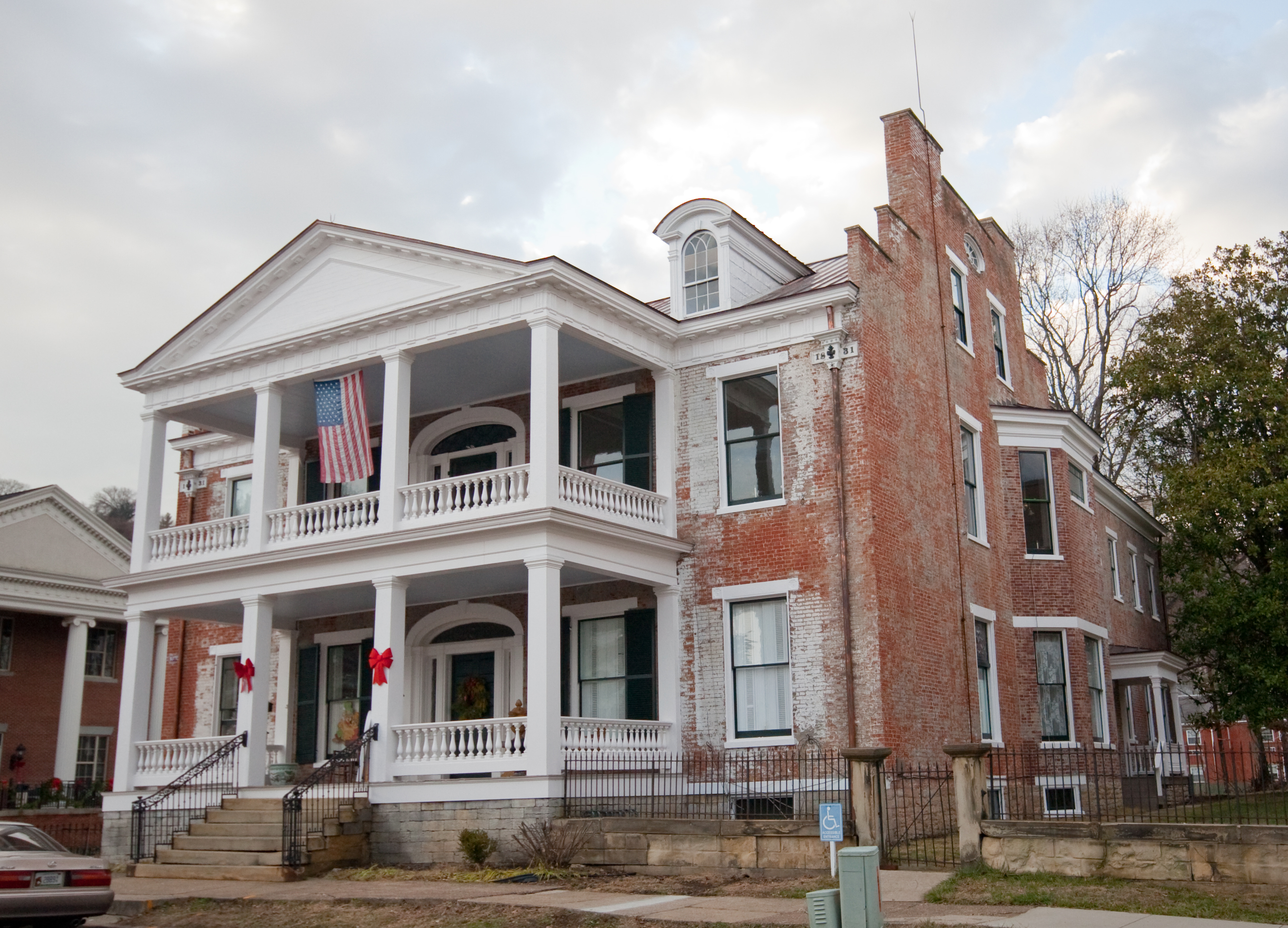

- Location within Kentucky Location within the United States
- Location: 227 Sutton St., Maysville, Kentucky
- Coordinates: 38°38′51″N 83°46′3″W
- Built: 1825–1831
- Architectural style: Greek Revival, Federal, Georgian
- NRHP reference No.: 78001383
- Added to NRHP: August 10, 1978

Phillips' Folly is an historic three-story brick residence in Maysville, Kentucky. The home's Antebellum architecture displays a blend of styles which may be explained, in part, by the home's speculative six-year construction period, which ended with its completion in 1831. The Sutton Street entrances are Federal, windows are typical Greek Revival in their size and character, and the two-tiered portico and the segmental dormers reflect a Georgian influence. The portico and Doric frieze are similar to Drayton Hall (1738–42) near Charleston, South Carolina. The stepped parapets on the end walls are peculiar to the Ohio River Valley and are "associated with the 'Dutch' character of Cincinnati, Ohio and the surrounding area." The home also possesses an artful and unique dry stacked foundation that is set without mortar. Phillips' Folly was added to the National Register of Historic Places on August 10, 1978. Phillips' Folly is a private residence.

== Construction and early history ==
William B. Phillips was Maysville's second mayor and was among those who welcomed General Lafayette during his 1825 Maysville visit. Phillips is listed as serving as Mason County's state legislator in 1820. Phillips' residence earned the term "folly" because the mansion's construction began as early as 1825, but was halted for up to six years due to lack of funding. According to a 1973 magazine article, "leaving the house unfinished, the owner disappeared for two years, during which time he won enough money [in New Orleans] at gambling to complete the structure".

Phillips sold his "folly" to wealthy businessman John Armstrong in 1838. Armstrong was instrumental in the early development of the Commonwealth of Kentucky and Maysville, Kentucky, in particular. Armstrong was the first to sign a petition to move the county seat from Washington to Maysville. Armstrong was a member of the company responsible for building the Maysville and Lexington Turnpike, which was the subject of the significant historical decision involving U.S. President Andrew Jackson, Secretary of State Martin Van Buren and Congressman Henry Clay referred to as the Maysville Road veto. The Maysville Road veto served as one of President Jackson's first acts in aligning the federal government with the principles of what would later be known as Jacksonian democracy. Armstrong established the first bank in Kentucky in 1818. Armstrong died in the home in 1851. After John Armstrong's death, the home was willed to Armstrong's son, Francis Woodland Armstrong, who served as a noted abolitionist.

The Reed family owned the home from 1894 to 1904. Dr. John Reed maintained a medical practice in the basement of the residence for about 10 years. Also during this period, the residence was the adolescent home of U.S. Associate Supreme Court Justice, Stanley Forman Reed. Justice Reed spent formative years in the home until leaving for college. Reed would go on to serve in the Kentucky House of Representatives and as U.S. Solicitor General, where he defended the constitutionality of several New Deal policies. President Franklin D. Roosevelt nominated Reed to the Supreme Court in 1938. Justice Reed served the nation's highest court until his retirement in 1957. Justice Reed wrote the majority opinion for the cases Smith v. Allwright, Gorin v. United States, and Adamson v. California. He authored dissenting opinions for the cases Illinois ex rel. McCollum v. Board of Education. Reed was the final pivotal vote for the unanimity of the U.S. Supreme Court landmark decision in Brown v. Board of Education.

According to oral history, during the ownership of Francis Woodland Armstrong, the mansion served as an important post along the Underground Railroad. During this time corresponding with the American Civil War, runaway slaves were held in a wooden jail cell that dates to the home's original 1831 construction. Runaway slaves would be housed in the basement jail cell until it was deemed safe for them to continue their journey to the nearby free state of Ohio. It is believed that slaves were kept in the jail to foil slave hunters who were likely to search the home. A tunnel leading to a secret room once used by slaves to escape to the Ohio River can still be seen in the home's basement. The basement jail cell is still intact today and is thought to have also served as an early town jail during the ownership of Mayor Phillips.

== Folklore ==
In March 2011, Ghost Adventures from the Travel Channel filmed at Phillips' Folly. The episode aired on Friday, May 13, 2011. It featured former resident and Underground Railroad historian, Jerry Gore. The home is said to be the residence of several spirits, including John Armstrong and his Newfoundland dog; by John Pearce who died in the home around 1890 either by fighting a duel in the home's back parlor or by suicide in the home's back parlor (dueling was outlawed at the time, therefore death by suicide may have been the manner of death officially recorded); and by former slaves who were chained in the basement prior to the home's abolitionist history. The home's backyard is directly adjacent to one of the oldest known cemeteries in Kentucky (circa 1800–1850) referred to locally as the Maysville Pioneer Graveyard, which was established on land acquired by city trustee Jacob Boone, close friend, business partner, and cousin to Daniel Boone. Jacob Boone and his family are buried in the Maysville Pioneer Graveyard in a plot notating Jacob's militia service during the American Revolutionary War.
