= Fox Farm site (Mays Lick, Kentucky) =

Archaeological site in Kentucky, U.S.

- Fox Farm Site
- U.S. National Register of Historic Places
- Nearest city: Mays Lick
- Area: 40 acres (16 ha)
- NRHP reference No.: 83002822
- Added to NRHP: May 9, 1983

The Fox Farm Site is a Middle Fort Ancient culture Manion Phase (1200 to 1400 CE) archaeological site located near Mays Lick in Mason County, Kentucky. The site consists of a large village complex on a ridge 2.5 kilometres (1.6 mi) south of the Licking River and 10 kilometres (6.2 mi) south of the Ohio River. The site covers 10-16 hectares and has midden areas up to 80 centimetres (31 in) thick. It was added to the National Register of Historic Places on May 9, 1983.
