= Benjamin Drake =

American historian (1794–1841)

Benjamin Drake (November 28, 1794, May's Lick, Kentucky – April 1, 1841, Cincinnati) was a historian, editor, and writer born to Isaac Drake (1756–1832) and Elizabeth Shotwell (maiden; 1761–1821). His elder brother was the medical doctor and author Daniel Drake. Benjamin co-founded and for seven years was the editor of the Cincinnati Chronicle.

== Literary work ==
- Cincinnati in 1826. 1827
- The life and adventures of Black Hawk: with sketches of Keokuk, The Sac and Fox Indians, and the late Black Hawk War. 1838
- Tales and sketches, from the Queen City 1838
- Sketches of the civil and military services of William Henry Harrison 1840
- Life of Tecumseh: and of his brother The Prophet; with a historical sketch of the Shawanoe Indians. 1852

== Family ==
Benjamin married Maria Ogden on December 19, 1818, they had seven children: Francis, Elizabeth, Jane, Benjamin, Marie, James Fitch, and George.
