= Point Au View =

Historic house in Kentucky, United States

- U.S. National Register of Historic Places
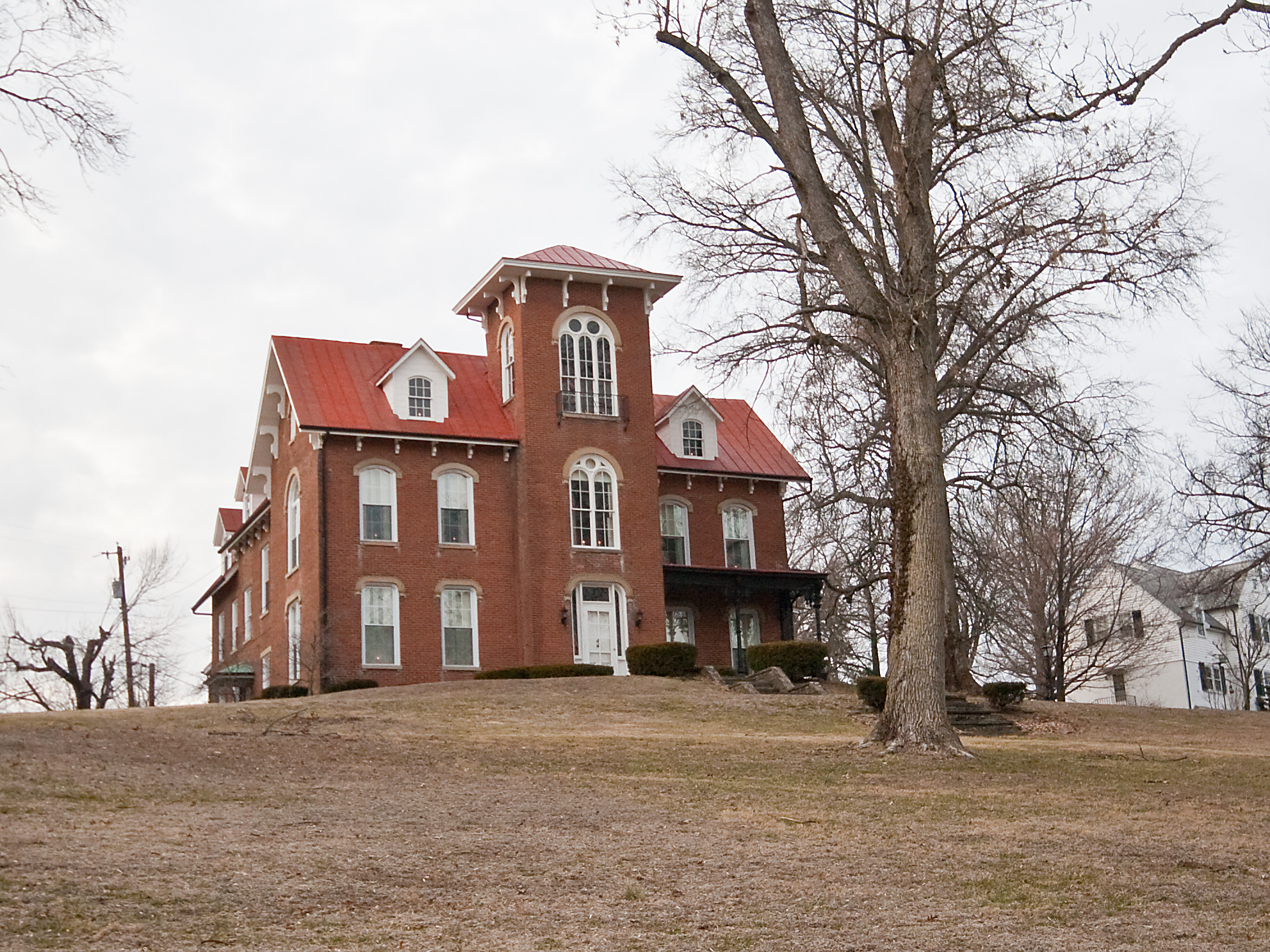

- Location within Kentucky Location within the United States
- Location: 721 Hillcrest Road, Maysville, Kentucky
- Coordinates: 38°38′55.46″N 83°46′36.45″W
- Built: 1854–1860
- Architectural style: Italian villa
- NRHP reference No.: 85000015
- Added to NRHP: January 4, 1985

Point Au View is an Italian villa architecture house located in Mason County, Kentucky. It was built in the 1850s for Judge Emory C. Whitaker, a prominent Maysville lawyer. Whitaker was born in New Hampshire in 1816 and moved to Kentucky in 1841. In 1849, he was elected to represent Mason County in the lower house of the Kentucky state legislature. He was elected Mason County Judge in 1853 and served for eight years.

Construction of the house on the Whitaker farm began in 1854 and continued for a number of years. Bricks used for construction of the 13-inch-thick walls were made on site. Completion was accelerated and the family occupied the house in 1860 based on a rumor that the unfinished structure was about to be confiscated to serve as a base hospital during the Civil War.

The Whitaker family occupied the property until about 1900 when it was sold to a prominent horseman named Langhorn Anderson. Horses from the farm were shown every year at the Germantown Fair. Stone pillars from the farm's show rings still stand on the grounds.

The farm was sold in the 1930s and subdivided into building lots. The house stood empty for several years and deteriorated from lack of maintenance. Robert Buckley bought the house in 1946 and restored many of its original features as well as adding a modern kitchen and three-car garage.
