= Washington Opera House =

- U.S. National Register of Historic Places
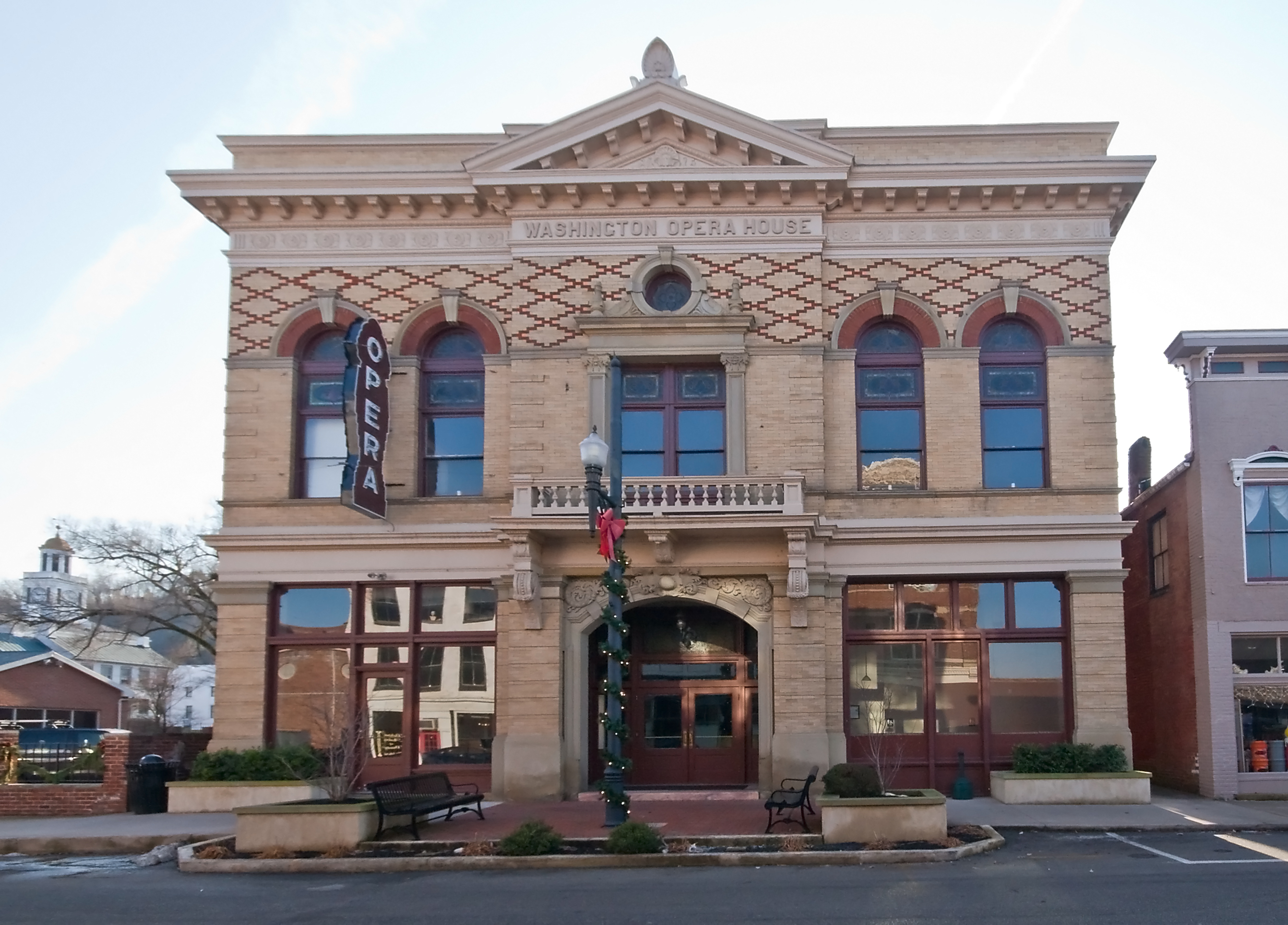
- Front of the building in 2010

- Location within Kentucky Location within the United States
- Location: 116 W. 2nd St., Maysville, Kentucky
- Coordinates: 38°38′55″N 83°46′02″W
- Area: less than one acre
- Built: 1898
- Architectural style: Beaux Arts
- NRHP reference No.: 75000805
- Added to NRHP: June 11, 1975

The Washington Opera House is a 2 and 1/2 story structure near the western end of the main downtown shopping district of Maysville, Kentucky.

The sides and rear of the theater are of red brick while the façade is of buff brick trimmed with red brick, stone, and cast iron.

== History ==
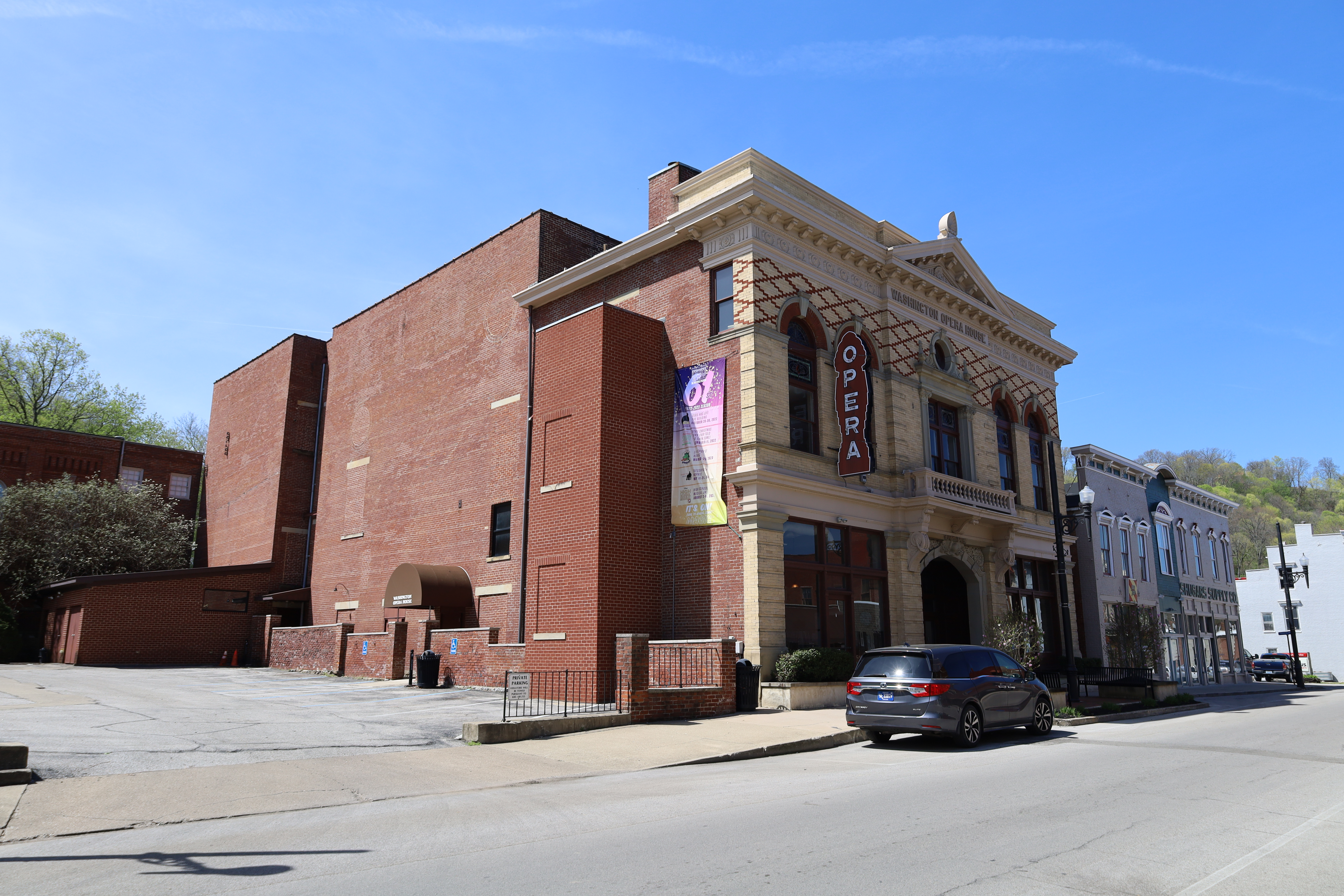
Side of the building in 2023

The tradition of theater in Mason County dates back to at least 1797 according to the Washington, Kentucky newspaper, The Mirror. The performance at the "Court House" is the first record of a stage performance west of the Alleghenies to disclose play titles, performance dates and prices. By 1817, there was a theater in Limestone (Maysville) at the corner of 2nd Street and Fish Street (now Wall Street).

A disastrous fire destroyed a significant amount of property on West Second Street in April 1850 including the Presbyterian Church, then known as the Old Blue Church. The church congregation decided to rebuild on Third Street, leaving the Second Street lot vacant. In 1851, two fire companies were formed to prevent a repeat of the town fire and an elegant theater, "The Opera House", was built on the site of the Old Blue Church.

In 1898, fire struck again and "The Opera House" was destroyed. Perhaps from remorse, the Washington Fire Company, organized at the time the theater was built - nearly five decades before, decided to rebuild it at a cost of $24,000 and the new structure was thereafter known as the "Washington Opera House".

A number of famous artists and actors performed here including Marguerite Clark, Tom Mix, John L. Sullivan, and John Philip Sousa and his band. The Washington Opera continues as a theater and is currently home to the Maysville Players.
