= Armstrong Row =

Historic house in Kentucky, United States

- U.S. National Register of Historic Places
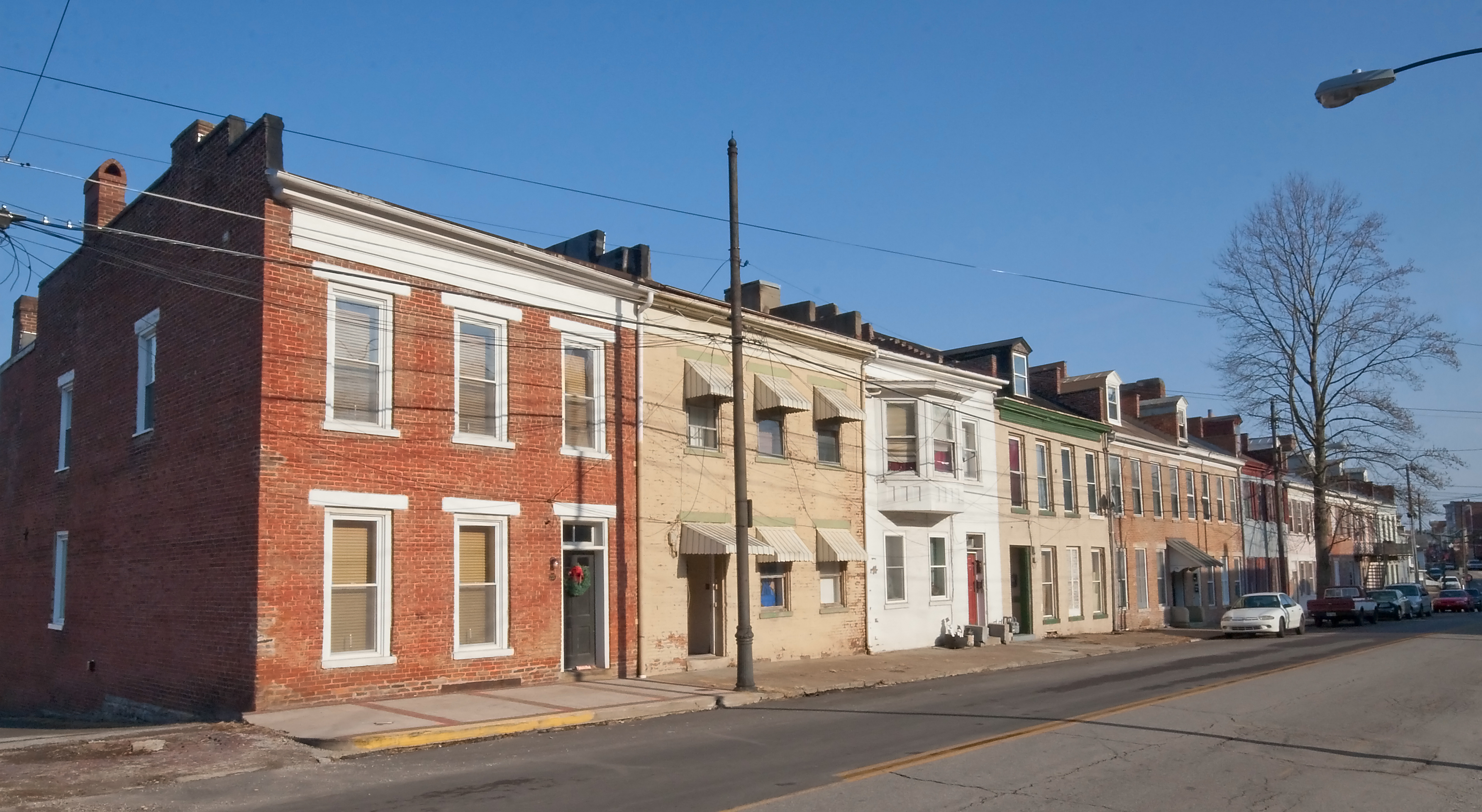
- The buildings of the district in 2010

- Location within Kentucky Location within the United States
- Location: 207–227 W. 2nd St., Maysville, Kentucky
- Coordinates: 38°38′59″N 83°46′8″W
- Built: 1820–1833
- Architectural style: Federal and Greek Revival
- NRHP reference No.: 84001818
- Added to NRHP: March 1, 1984

Armstrong Row is a series of 11 brick row houses in Maysville, Kentucky built between 1820 and 1833 by John Armstrong, a local industrialist, entrepreneur and real estate developer. The district became part of the larger Maysville Downtown Historic District when the latter was expanded in 2017.

== Architecture ==
The Armstrong Row houses are two story brick with gable roofs and stepped parapet walls in both Federal and Greek Revival style. The facade is Flemish bond and sides are common bond. Although similar in construction, the gable roofs vary in pitch suggesting the buildings were constructed either by more than one builder or over a period of time.

== History ==
Vacant lots were purchased by an Armstrong owned company that operated the Maysville cotton mill. The company continued to operate as the January & Wood Company until 2003. Armstrong also developed a number of other row house projects in Maysville including the Federal style row houses on Limestone Street, Mechanic's Row, and the "Allen Block".

John Armstrong was born in Ireland in 1779 and emigrated to America with his family circa 1790. He bought his first Maysville property in 1800 from Jacob Boone, a first cousin of Daniel Boone. He later operated several wholesale houses on front street becoming wealthy in the process.

Armstrong was instrumental in the early development of the city and was the first to sign a petition to move the county seat from Washington to Maysville. He was a member of the company responsible for building the Maysville and Lexington Turnpike, he established the first bank in Kentucky in Maysville in 1818, and was a member of the committee that welcomed General Lafayette to Maysville in an 1825 visit.

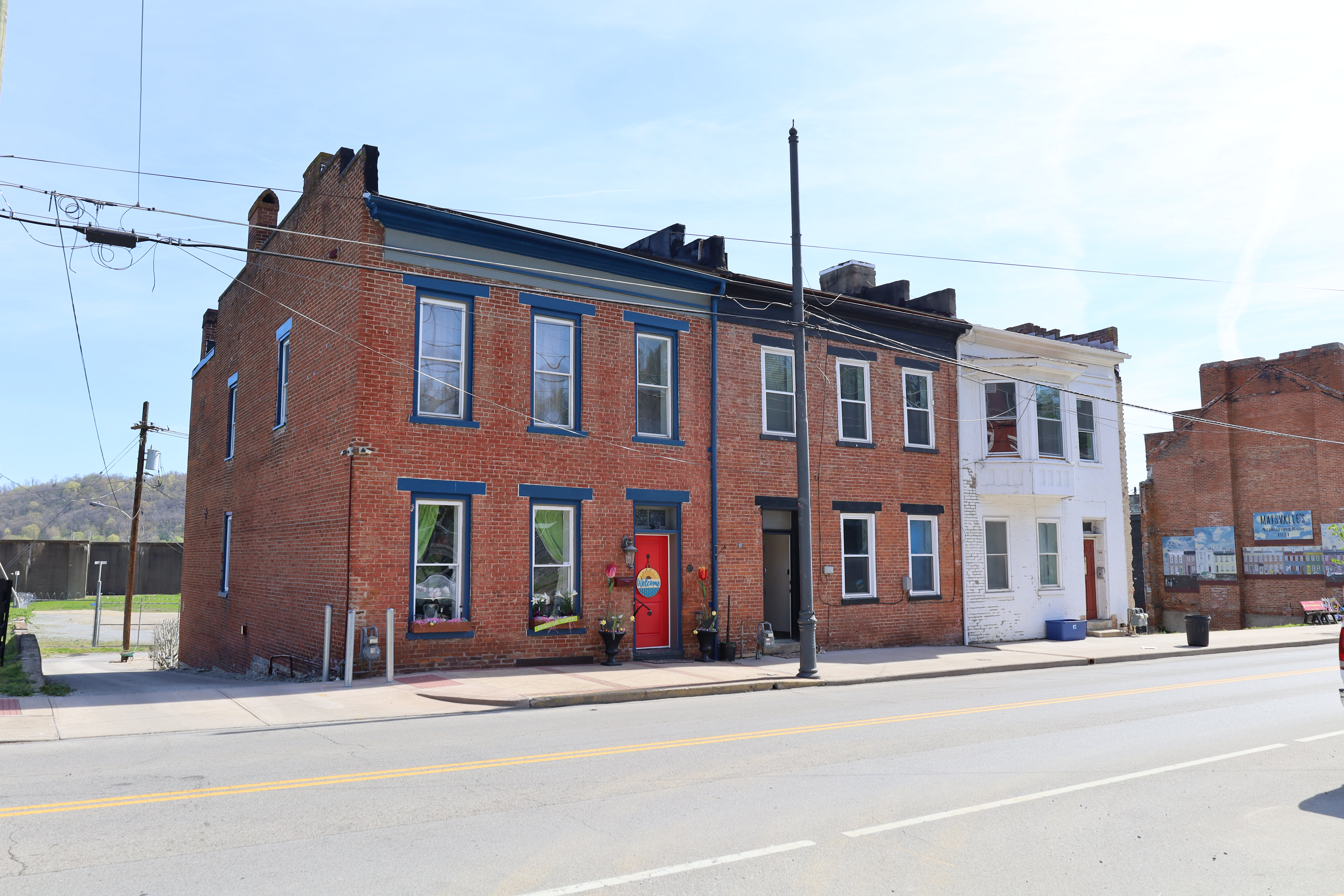
The western part of the district in 2023; the gap at right is the site of the destroyed units

Three of the units were damaged in a fire in 2016, and were demolished the following year.
