= Maysville Downtown Historic District =

Historic district in Kentucky, United States

- U.S. National Register of Historic Places
- U.S. Historic district
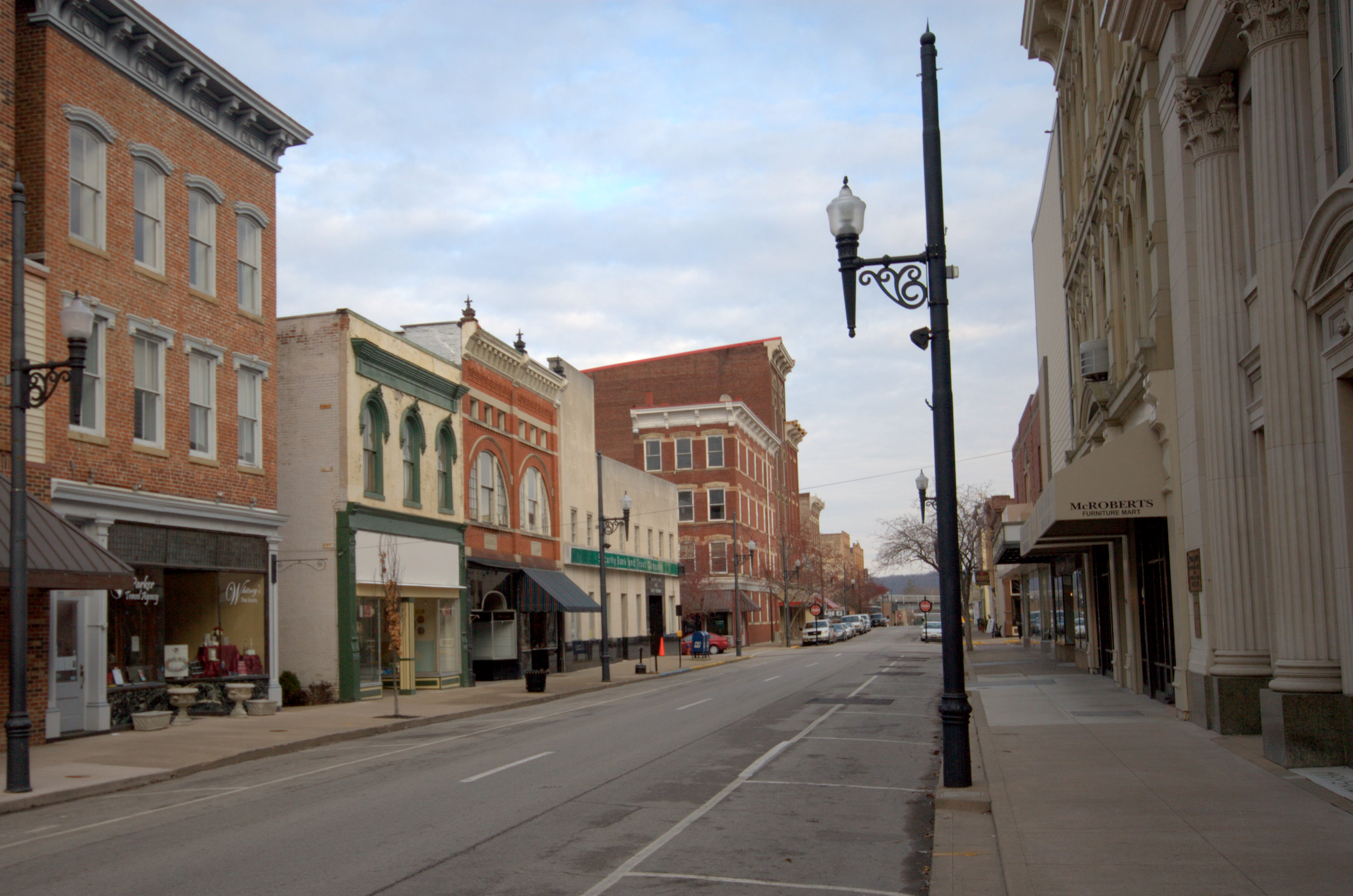
- Buildings in the district in 2011

- Location within Kentucky Location within the United States
- Location: Maysville, Kentucky
- Coordinates: 38.64729°N 83.76485°W
- NRHP reference No.: 82002734 (original); 16000502 (increase)

Significant dates
- Added to NRHP: March 1, 1982
- Boundary increase: March 13, 2017

The Maysville Downtown Historic District is a historic district in Maysville, Kentucky. It was created in 1982 and expanded in 2017. It has absorbed three smaller listed historic districts: the Courthouse Square and Mechanics' Row Historic District, Armstrong Row, and the West Fourth Street Historic District, and contains many individually listed historic structures.

== Description ==
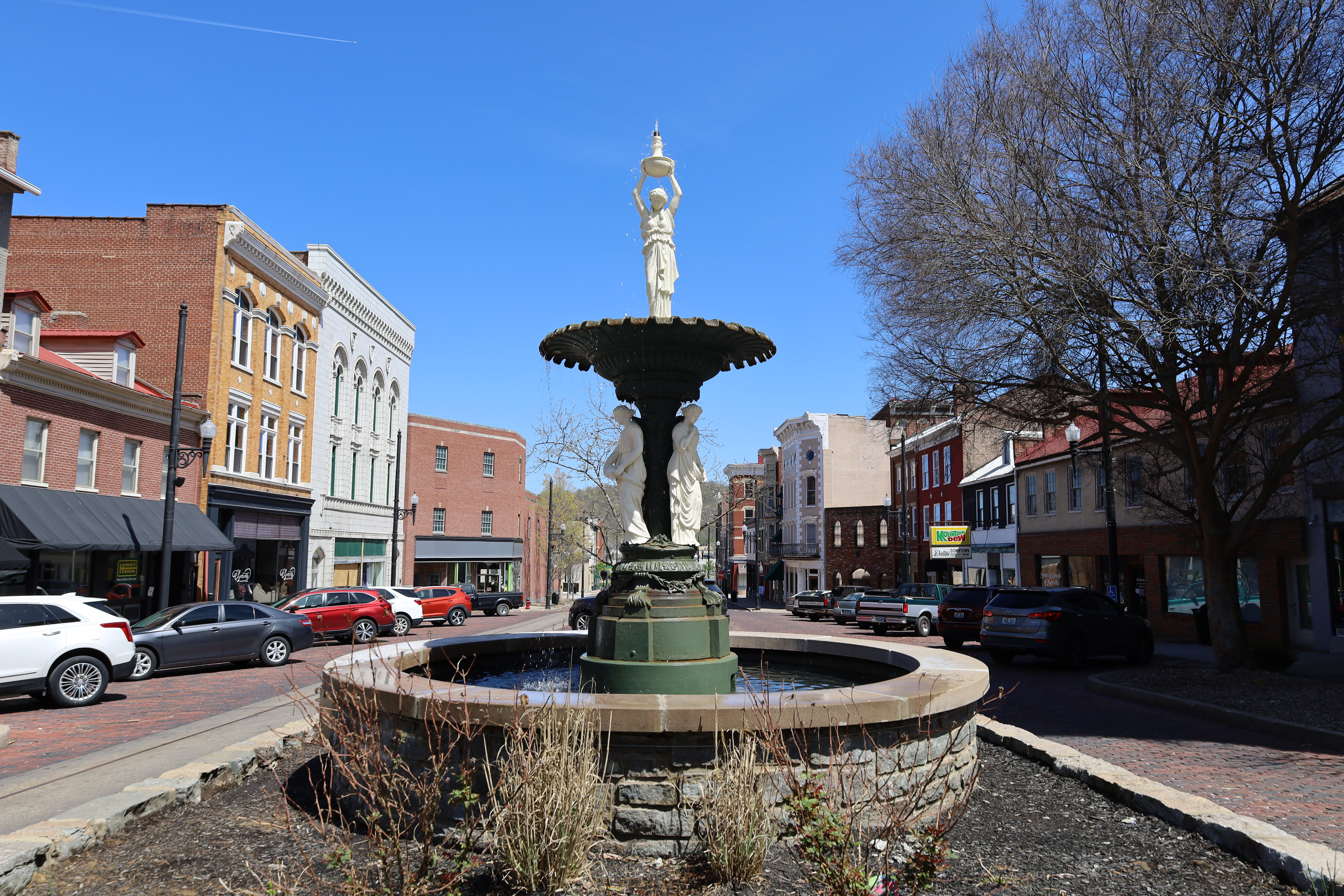
Fountain in the district in 2023

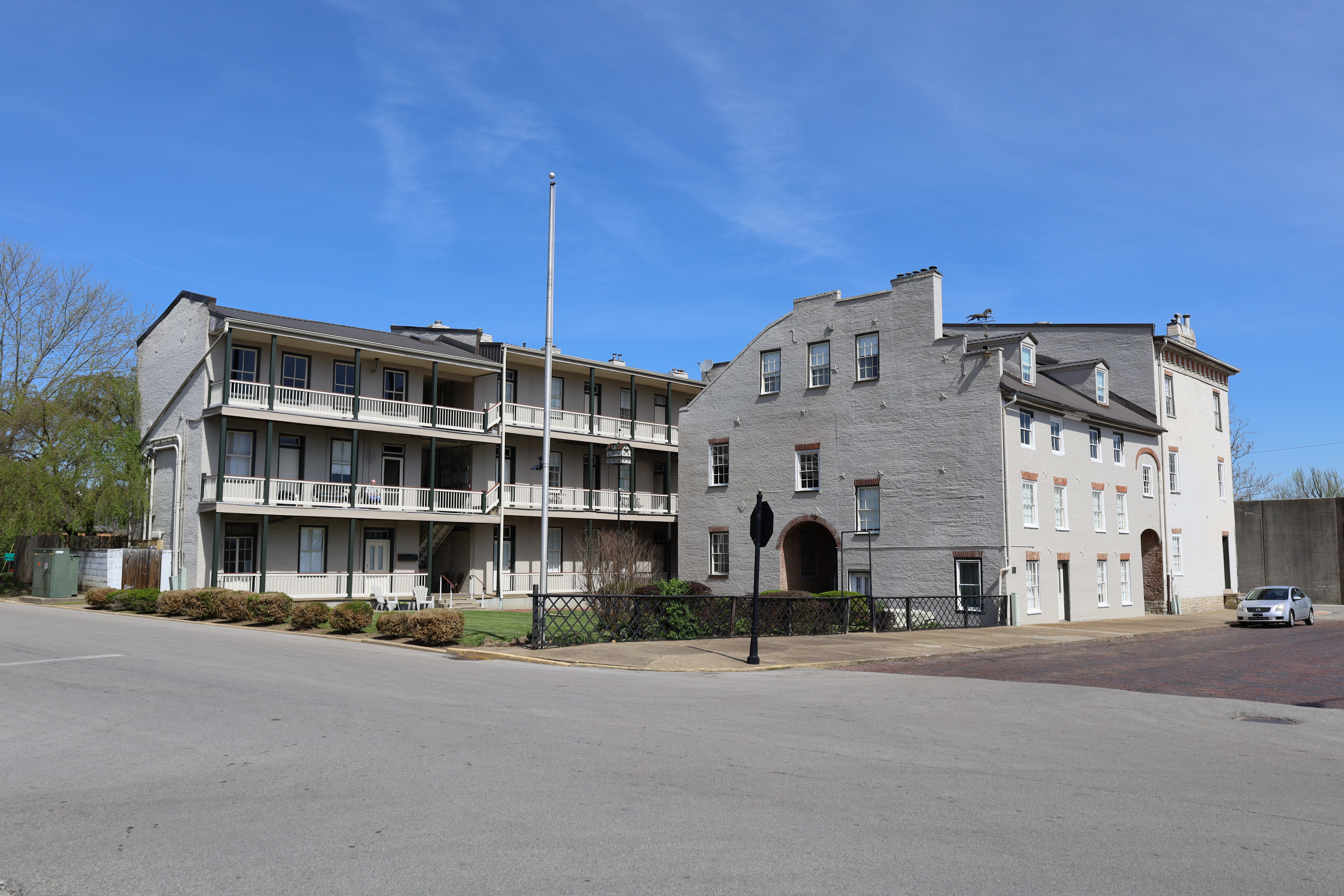
The historic Lee House Inn in 2023

Situated in the western part of Maysville, it is the area first settled and developed in the city. The downtown is defined by a grid of streets laid out parallel to the northwest–southeast curve of the Ohio River. The area is essentially rectangular, four and a half blocks long and two to two and a half blocks wide. Its western edge is marked by Wall Street and its northern extent by West Front Street and McDonald Parkway. Its eastern and southern boundaries generally conform to the rear property lines of buildings on the east side of Limestone Street and the south side of Third Street respectively.

In 1982, when the National Register application was completed, the Maysville downtown contained 155 buildings, as well as one cemetery and notable street sculpture. The buildings served a variety of functions. About 62% or 96 of the buildings were devoted primarily to commercial use, while 28% or 43 were residential. The district also included five churches, two theaters, one high school complex, one library, one museum and five governmental buildings, including the county courthouse and jail. All buildings were structurally sound and together achieved a first floor occupancy rate of 98%.

Of the 155 buildings in the district, 135 or 87% were constructed prior to 1930 and 92% are of brick. Two building types may be identified which characterize the Maysville downtown. The first appeared in the early 19th century, generally between 1825 and 1850, The two-to three-story brick residential building of this era display trabeated openings, crow-stepped gable ends and a simplicity of exterior detail. Such structures often share bearing walls as components of residential "rows." The second type, a three to six story brick commercial building type was constructed in Maysville from about 1875 to the First World War. The key elements of the type are the bracketed cornice, arched window cap and pilasters.
