= West Fourth Street Historic District (Maysville, Kentucky) =

Historic district in Kentucky, United States

- West Fourth Street District
- U.S. National Register of Historic Places
- U.S. Historic district
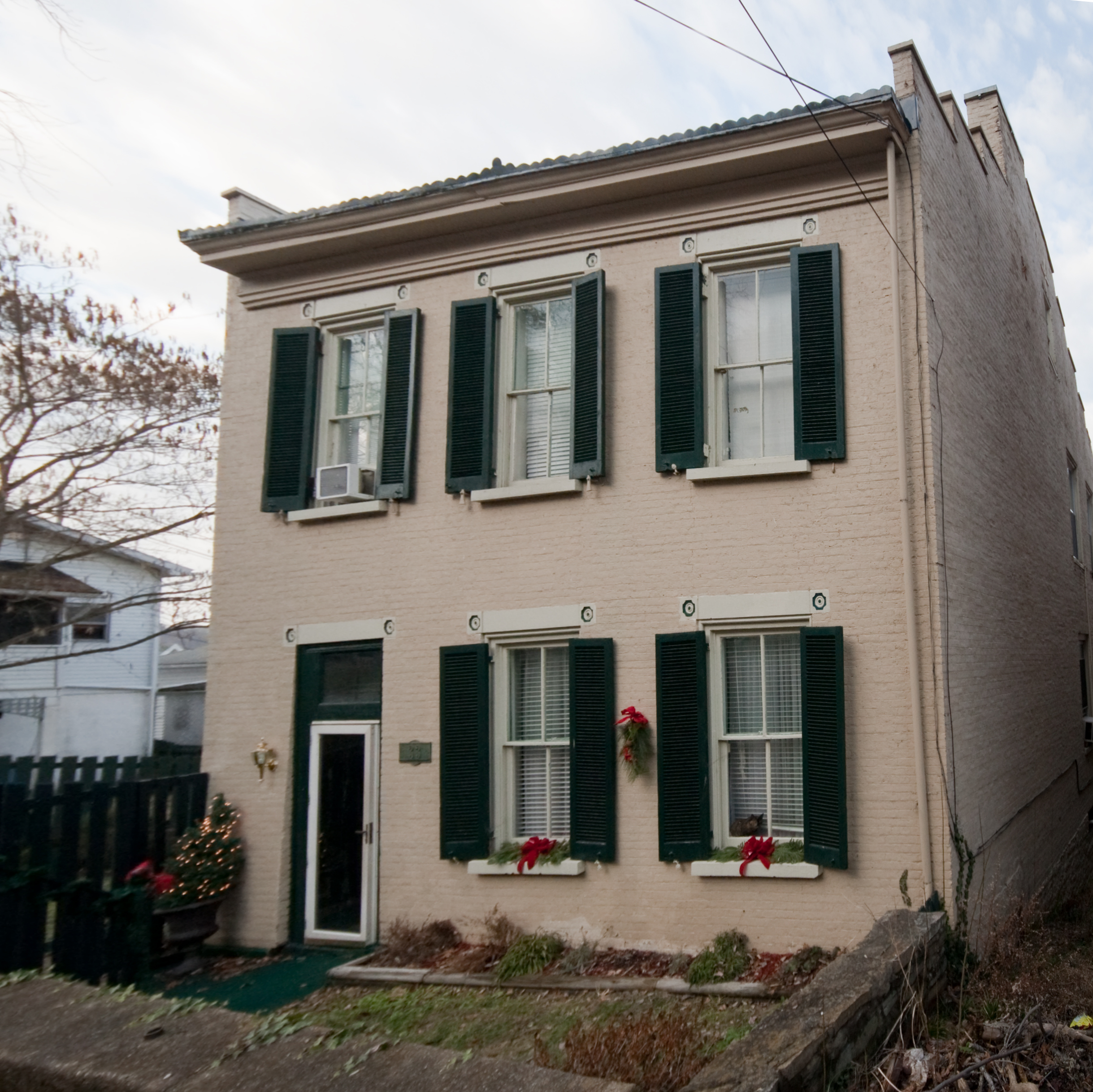
- Residence at 33 W. Fourth Street

- Location within Kentucky Location within the United States
- Location: 24, 29, 31, 32, 33 W. 4th St. Maysville, Kentucky
- Built: 1840, 1847, 1849
- Architect: Multiple
- Architectural style: various
- NRHP reference No.: 74000896
- Added to NRHP: November 7, 1974

The West Fourth Street District is an historic district in Maysville, Kentucky comprising five residences. The district became part of the larger Maysville Downtown Historic District when the latter was expanded in 2017.

The structures are situated on Fourth Street between Market and Sutton Streets. Construction is brick in the Greek Revival style with little exterior ornamentation. Parapets and stepped gables - reflecting the influence of German immigrants - are characteristic of river towns but unusual elsewhere in Kentucky.

The five houses were constructed between 1840 and 1849. Both Ficklin House and Bierbower houses were built circa 1840. 33 and 31 West Fourth Street are row houses and a deed provides validation that 33 was in existence by 1847. 29 West Fourth Street was constructed in 1849.
