= Courthouse Square and Mechanics' Row Historic District =

Historic district in Kentucky, United States

- U.S. National Register of Historic Places
- U.S. Historic district
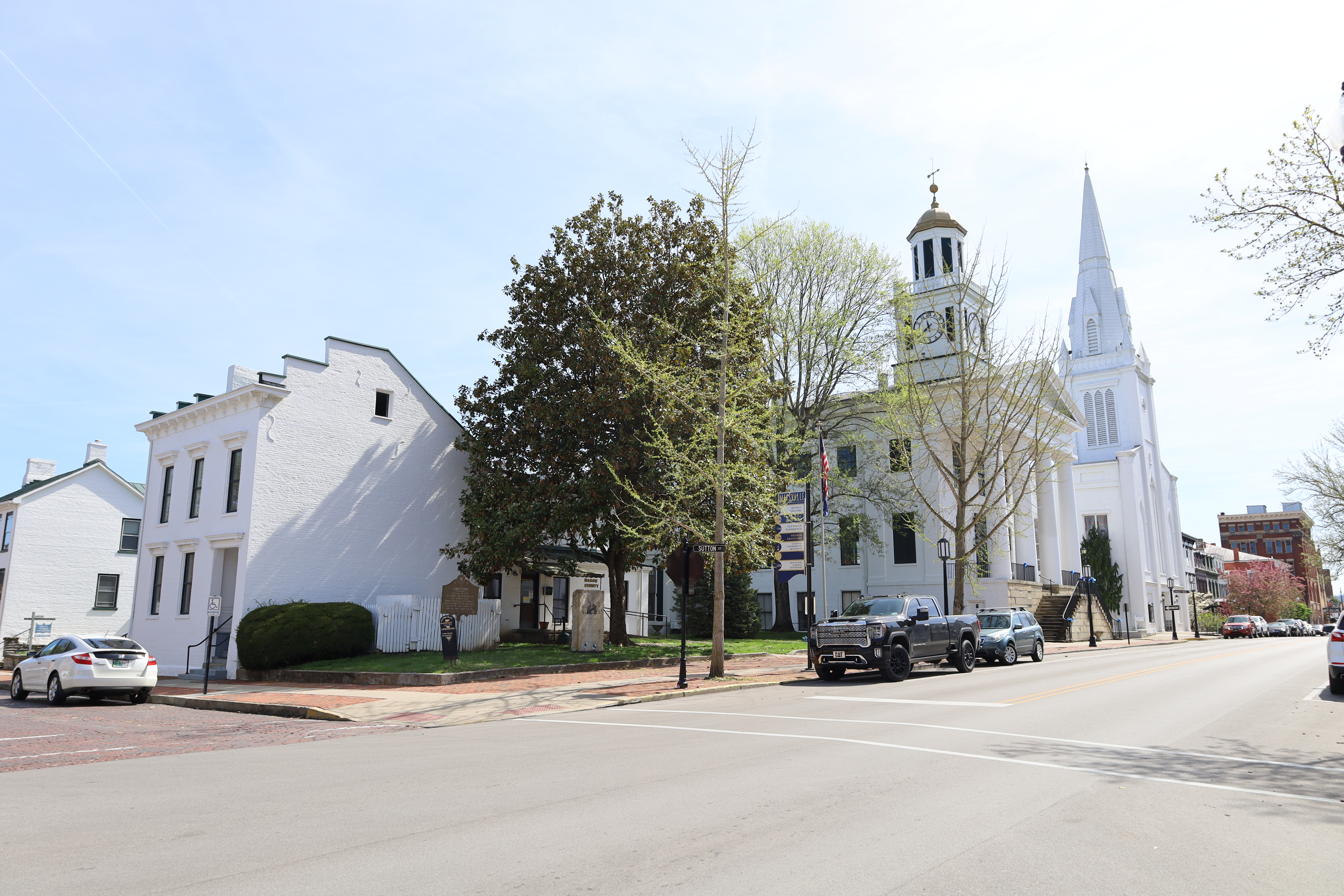
- Buildings of the district, including the Old Courthouse and Presbyterian Church in 2023

- Location within Kentucky Location within the United States
- Location: Maysville, Kentucky
- Coordinates: 38.64732°N 83.7663°W
- Architect: Multiple
- Architectural style: various
- NRHP reference No.: 75000803
- Added to NRHP: May 12, 1975

The Courthouse Square and Mechanics' Row Historic District is a historic district in Maysville, Kentucky, USA. The district structures are situated on Third Street between Market and Sutton Streets. The district became part of the larger Maysville Downtown Historic District when the latter was formed in 1982.

The district includes the Old Mason County, Kentucky Courthouse, the Sheriff's office and the Presbyterian Church as well as residences known as Mechanic's Row and Doctor's Row. The district comprises 15 houses, three offices and one church. The original Mechanic's Row houses are believed to have had separate kitchen outbuildings behind them that were later connected.

== History ==
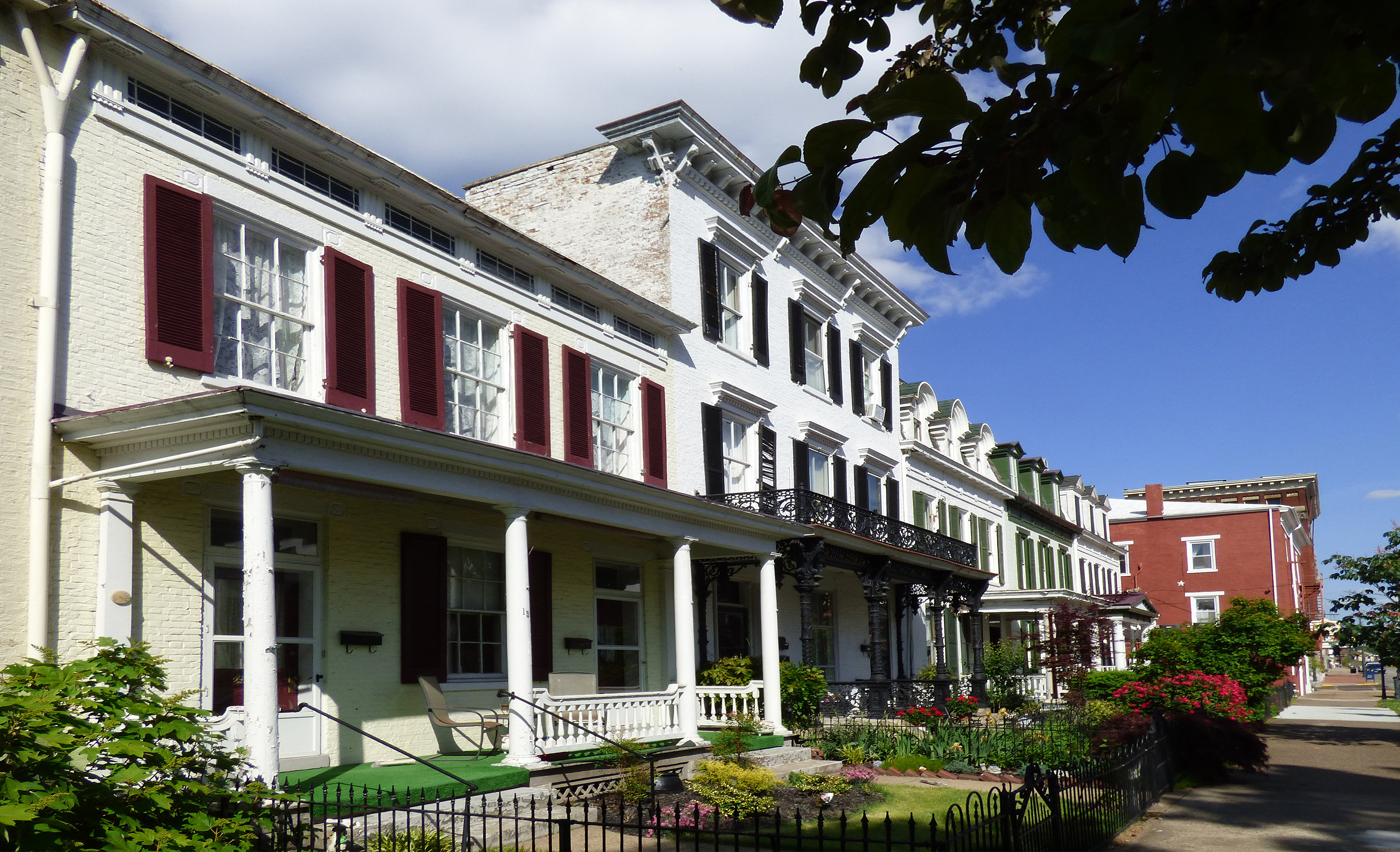
Mechanics' Row in 2014

The Greek Revival Mason County Courthouse was built in 1844. It is treated as a temple with a continuous cornice or entablature. The adjacent Presbyterian Church was built in Gothic style in 1850 following the destruction of an earlier Second Street church by fire.

John Armstrong, a local developer and industrialist, built the Mechanic's Row houses circa 1816. They are considered among the finest examples of New Orleans-inspired architecture in Kentucky. The land on which Mechanics' Row sits once belonged to Edmund Martin who purchased the property in 1797 from John May. The name stems from the residents who were merchants and skilled craftsmen. An earlier name for the row houses was "Tub Row" owing to the tubs of ornamental shrubs that appeared on the porches each spring.
