= Daniel Drake =

American journalist (1785–1852)

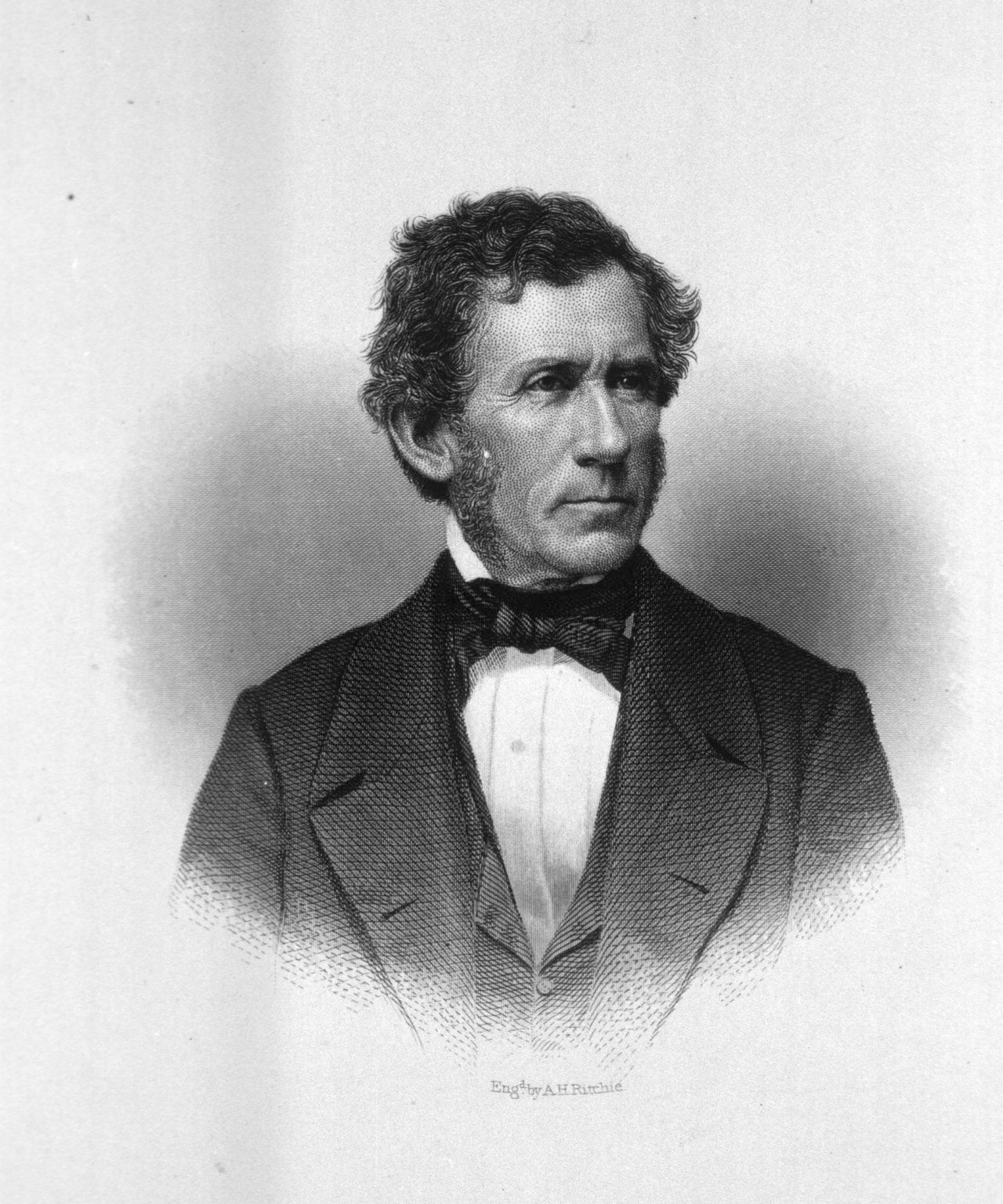
- Born: October 20, 1785; Plainfield, New Jersey, US
- Died: November 5, 1852 (aged 67); Cincinnati, Ohio, US
- Resting place: Spring Grove Cemetery
- Education: University of Pennsylvania
- Children: Charles Daniel Drake

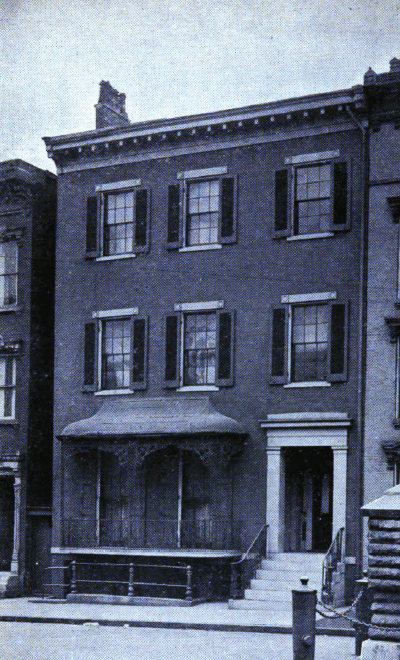
Daniel Drake's house in 1902

Daniel Drake (October 20, 1785 – November 5, 1852) was a pioneering American medical doctor and prolific writer.

== Early life ==
Drake was born in Plainfield, New Jersey, to Isaac Drake and Elizabeth Shotwell. He was the elder brother of Benjamin Drake, author of Life of Tecumseh. Daniel Drake "was predestined for the medical profession by his father. The latter, we are told by those who knew him, was a gentleman by nature and a Christian from convictions produced by a simple and unaffected study of the Word of God. His poverty he regretted, his ignorance he deplored."

== Career ==
Drake studied under William Goforth in Cincinnati from 1800 to 1805, and received the first medical diploma west of the Allegheny Mountains. Daniel graduated from the medical school of the University of Pennsylvania and established a medical practice in Cincinnati, Ohio, in 1807.

He mainly worked on the field of medicine but also advocated social reforms and contributed to geology, botany, and meteorology, and medical geology. He is considered a relevant figure in the history of medicine in the United States. He has been called "a heroic figure in American medicine" whose fame is due to his writings, where he also tried to improve medical education and scientific research.

In 1818 Drake was elected a member of the American Antiquarian Society and the American Philosophical Society. The library of the AAS holds original copies of around thirty texts written by Drake. He was elected a Fellow of the American Academy of Arts and Sciences in 1819.

In 1819 he helped organize the Medical College of Ohio in Cincinnati which later became the University of Cincinnati Academic Health Center, where he served as a president. He secured a state appropriation for its support and that of a hospital.

In 1827 Drake and Guy W. Wright M.D. founded The Western Medical and Physical Journal, of which they were editors. Then in 1828 he founded another journal, with a similar name, The Western Journal of the Medical and Physical Sciences, of which Drake was sole editor. He continued to edit this journal until 1848. In 1846 he, William Maclay Awl and other members of the Ohio medical profession established the Ohio State Medical Society. He was a founding member of the Commercial Hospital and Lunatic Asylum in Ohio, and a fellow of the College of Physicians of Philadelphia. He was connected, either as a lecturer or professor, at different times, at the University of Louisville (Louisville, Kentucky) and Jefferson Medical College (Philadelphia, Pennsylvania). He was Professor of Theory and Practice of Medicine at Transylvania University. In 1852, he rejoined the faculty at the Medical College of Ohio but died a few days after receiving his appointment. He is buried at Spring Grove Cemetery.

== Personal life ==
He was the father of Charles Daniel Drake. Drake's home was located at 429 East Third Street in Cincinnati.

A religious man, he was a founding Member of Christ Church in Cincinnati, and he advocated the combination of Christian feelings and literature.

He is the namesake of Cincinnati's Daniel Drake Park and the Daniel Drake Rehabilitation Center at the University of Cincinnati Medical Center.

William Osler was a great admirer of Drake:

"It was his custom when he met anyone from Cincinnati to ask if a statue to Daniel Drake had been erected, for he had made a vow never to visit that city until Drake had been accorded the honour which was his due."

== Works ==
- Notices Concerning Cincinnati (1810; 1908)
- Natural and statistical view; or picture of Cincinnati and the Miami country (1815)
- An account of the epidemic cholera: as it appeared in Cincinnati (1832)
- Practical treatise on the history, prevention, and treatment of epidemic cholera (1832)
- Practical Essays on Medical Education (1832)
- An introductory lecture on the means of promoting the intellectual improvement of the students and physicians of the valley of the Mississippi (1844)
- Systematic Treatise on the Principal Diseases of the Interior Valley of North America, (1850–54)
- Pioneer Life in Kentucky: A series of reminiscential letters from Daniel Drake ... to his children (1870); edited by his son Charles D. Drake
