= Old Library Building (Maysville, Kentucky) =

- U.S. National Register of Historic Places
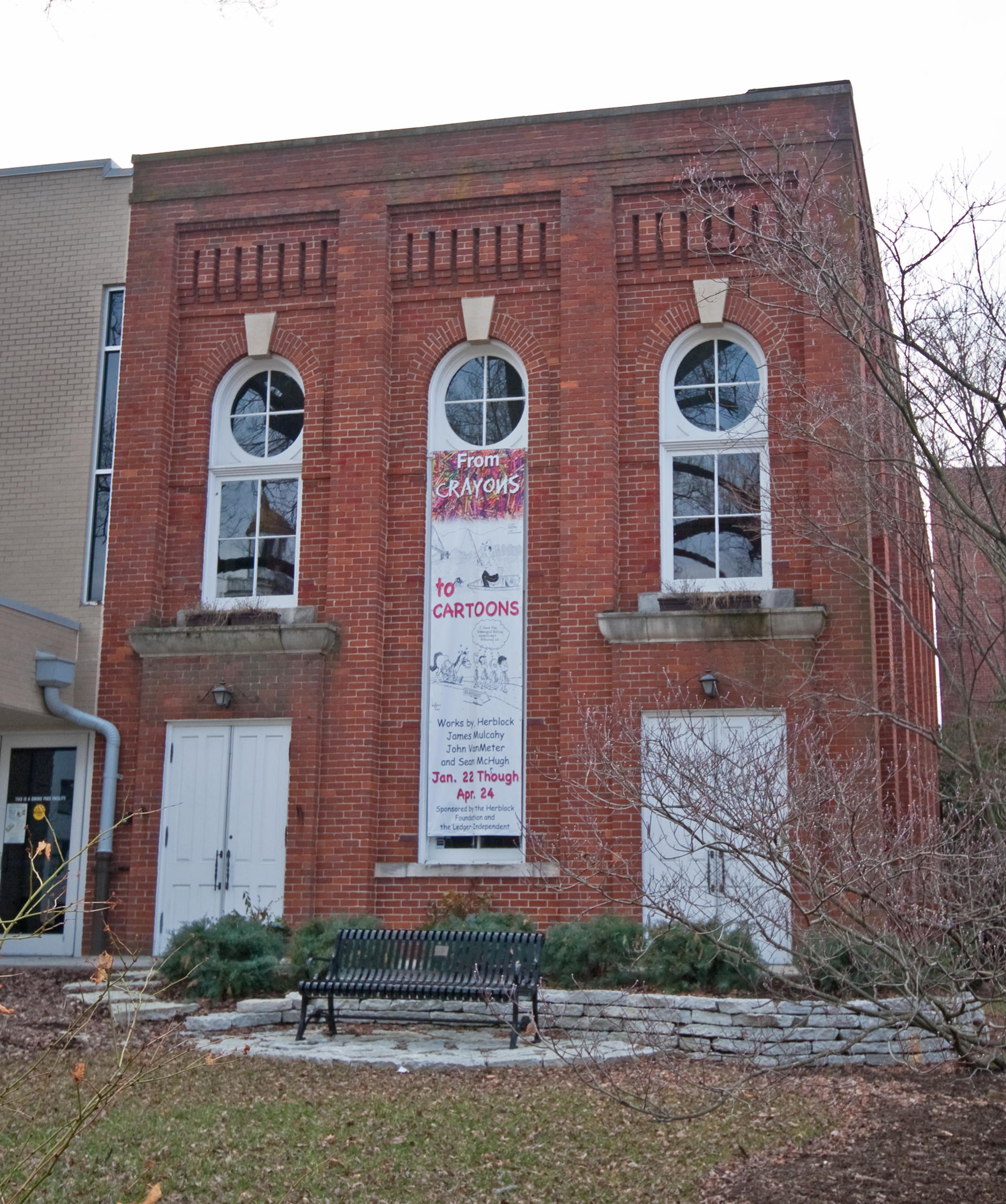

- Location within Kentucky Location within the United States
- Location: 221 Sutton St., Maysville, Kentucky
- Coordinates: 38°38′54″N 83°46′3″W
- Built: 1878–1880
- Architectural style: Italianate
- NRHP reference No.: 74000895
- Added to NRHP: August 30, 1974

The Old Library Building was chartered by the Maysville and Mason County Library, Historic and Scientific Association in 1878 and built between 1878 and 1880. It is the last of four libraries established in Maysville, Kentucky in the nineteenth century. It was preceded by the Maysville Lyceum – chartered in 1839, the Maysville Athenaeum – 1840, and the Maysville Library - date unknown, but no longer in existence by 1859.

The brick structure is long and narrow, set perpendicular to the street. The original front of the building facing Sutton Street was a bare brick wall. In 1973, a new wing was added with windows matching the original side elevation with the insertion of plain double doors into the end bays.

Structurally, there are tall narrow brick piers between which the actual wall is recessed, but most of the wall consists of the apparent frames of the tall, narrow two-story windows, which seem to occupy most of the surface. The deepest windows have round arches at the top with prominent stone keystones. Circular windows, framed in wood, are inserted within the arch. Above the keystones and within the vertical panels are corbelled brick features with narrow slits that suggest machicolation. Apparently, there has never been an ornamental cornice.

The scale of the two-story windows is non-residential and the form suggests a mid-19th-century Italianate style often applied to semi-public buildings such as fire stations, banks, Masonic meeting halls, and libraries. The interior originally consisted of a single long hall with gallery above. It is now reached by a staircase at the far end that splits above a central landing to lead up to the gallery on either side. The gallery is supported turned columns above newel posts.
