= Ben Moran House =

Heritage listed building in Kentucky

- U.S. National Register of Historic Places
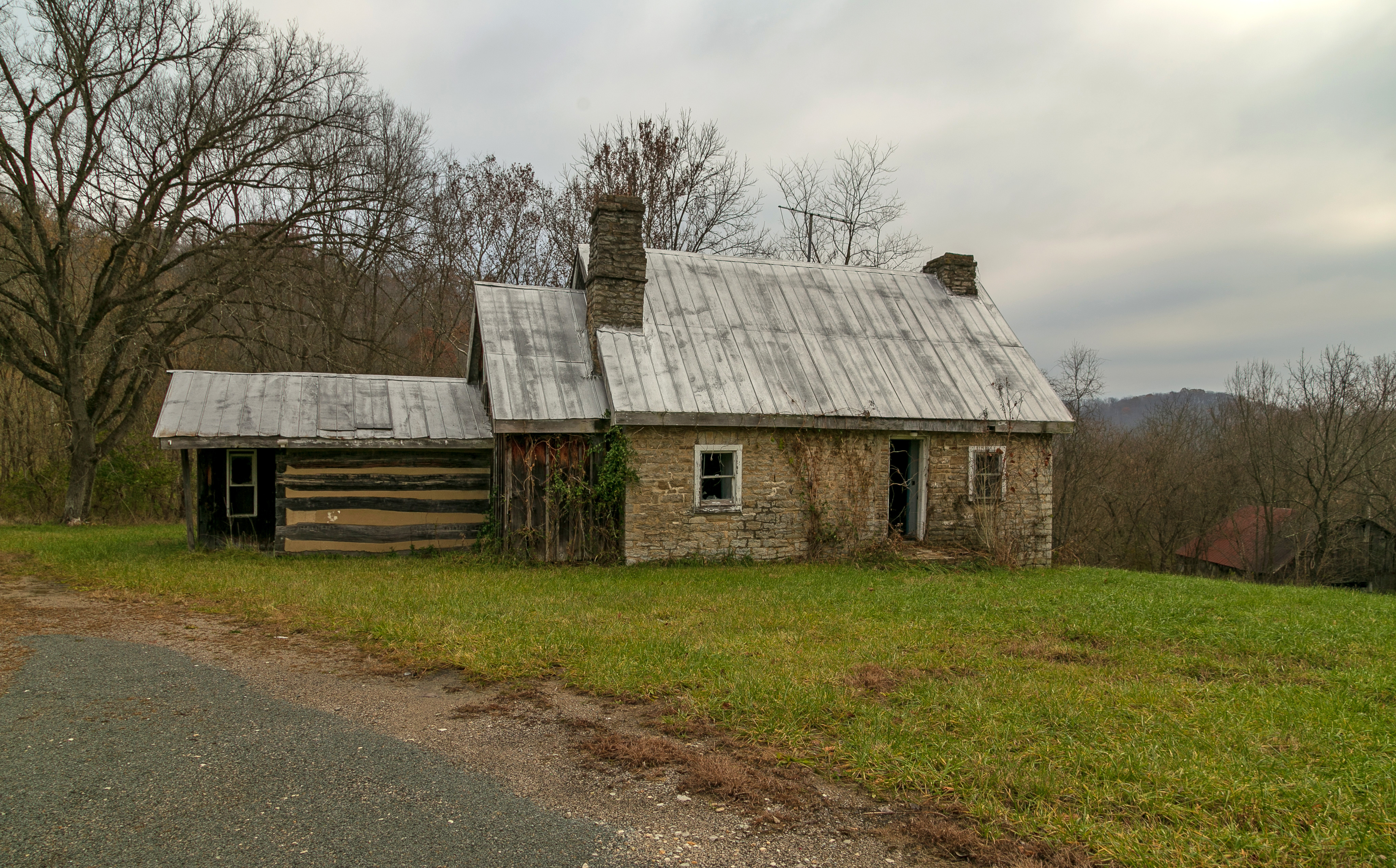

- Location within Kentucky Location within the United States
- Nearest city: Moranburg, Kentucky
- Coordinates: 38.672500°N 83.824722°W
- Area: 29 acres (12 ha)
- Built: 1818
- Architectural style: Federal
- MPS: Early Stone Buildings of Kentucky Outer Bluegrass and Pennyrile TR
- NRHP reference No.: 87000161
- Added to NRHP: January 8, 1987

Ben Moran House, is a historical residence in Mason County, Kentucky, which was built in 1818. The building was listed on the National Register of Historic Places in 1987, as part of a study of early stone houses in Kentucky.

It is located on the north-east corner of the intersection of Kentucky Route 8 and 10, about 0.5 miles (0.80 km) west of Moranburg, a hamlet, in Mason County, named for the Moran family.

It is a one and a half storey three-bay dry-stone house about 32 by 18 feet (9.8 m × 5.5 m) in plan, and is primarily Federal in style. It was in "good" condition in 1984. Its roof was replaced by a higher one in the 1880s either to make more space or to follow the then-current Gothic Revival fashion. The house had a rear ell which was damaged in a 1981 fire and was removed or replaced.

It was asserted to be "unique for its very primitive off-center fenestration reflecting the plan. It is not as sophisticated as the similarly sized Streube House (BK-23) in neighboring Bracken County. This one and the McGee House (ME-178 N.R.) in Mercer County are the most non-symmetrical of the early stone houses in Kentucky. This house was enlarged by steepening the roof in the Gothic period, either to add space or because of a change in fashion."

== See also ==
- John McGee House, Cornishville
