= Washington, Kentucky =

Village and neighborhood of Maysville, Kentucky, United States

Coordinates: 38°36′57″N 83°48′31″W

Washington is a neighborhood of the city of Maysville located near the Ohio River in Mason County in the U.S. state of Kentucky. It is one of the earliest settlements in Kentucky and also one of the earliest American settlements west of the Appalachian Mountains. It played a significant role in the lead-up to the Civil War, producing two civil war generals (one Union and one Confederate) and an escaped slave whose legal case established Canada as a safe haven for escaping slaves. It also provided the site where Harriet Beecher Stowe witnessed a slave auction. It has since been annexed by Maysville, and is sometimes now referred to as Old Washington. The community is in Area 606 served by the 759 exchange.

== History ==
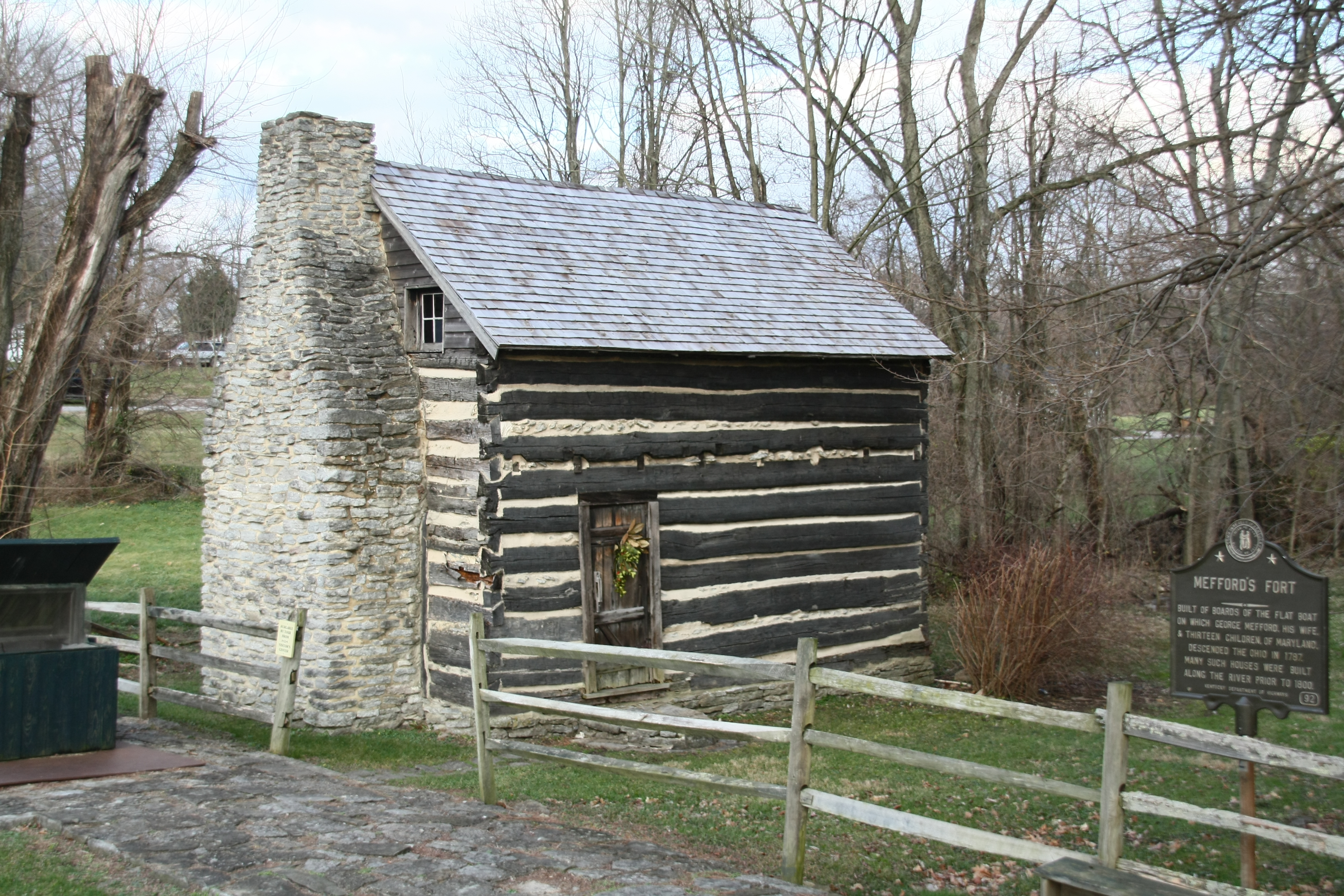
Log cabin built from "flat boat" lumber

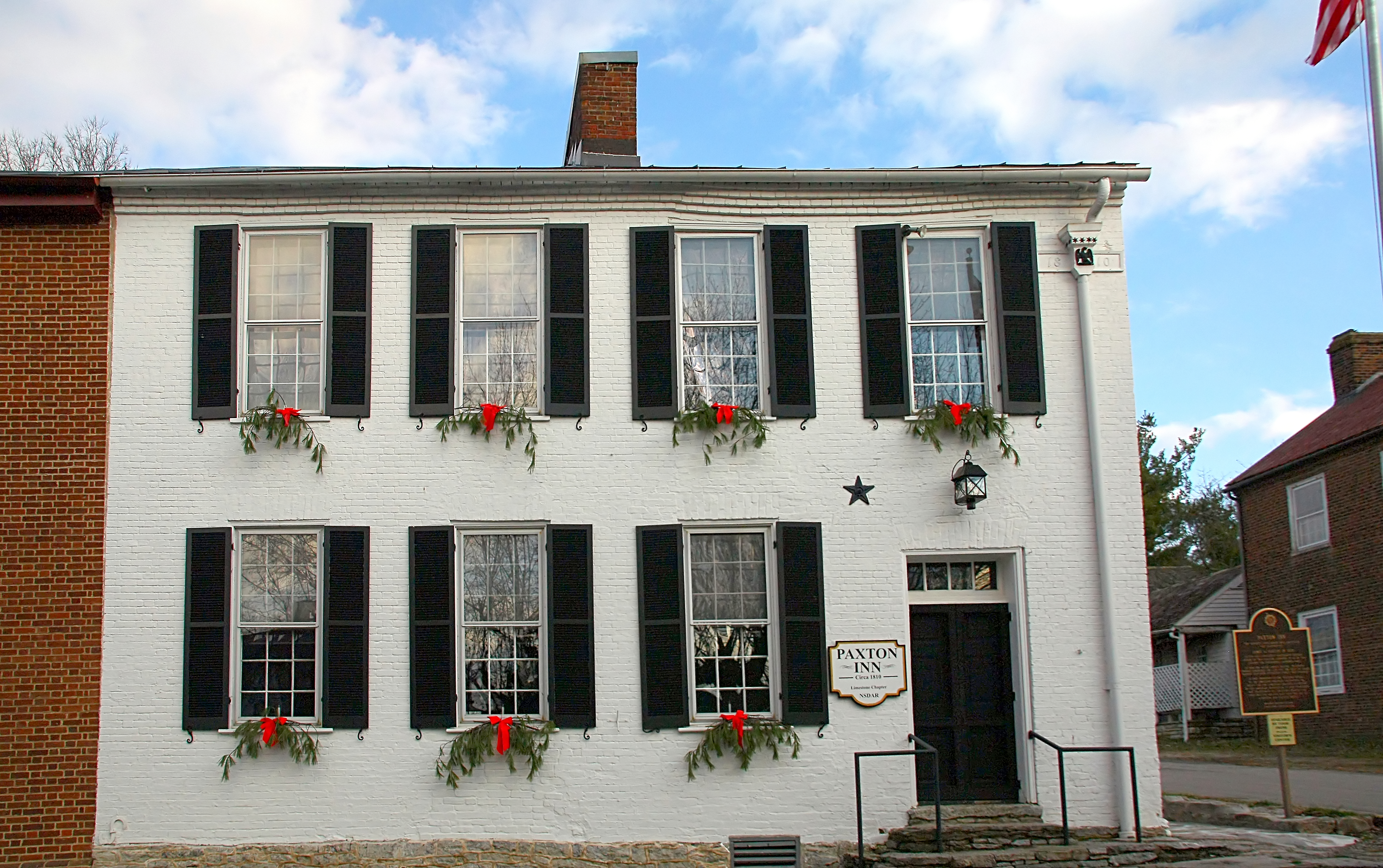
Paxton Inn

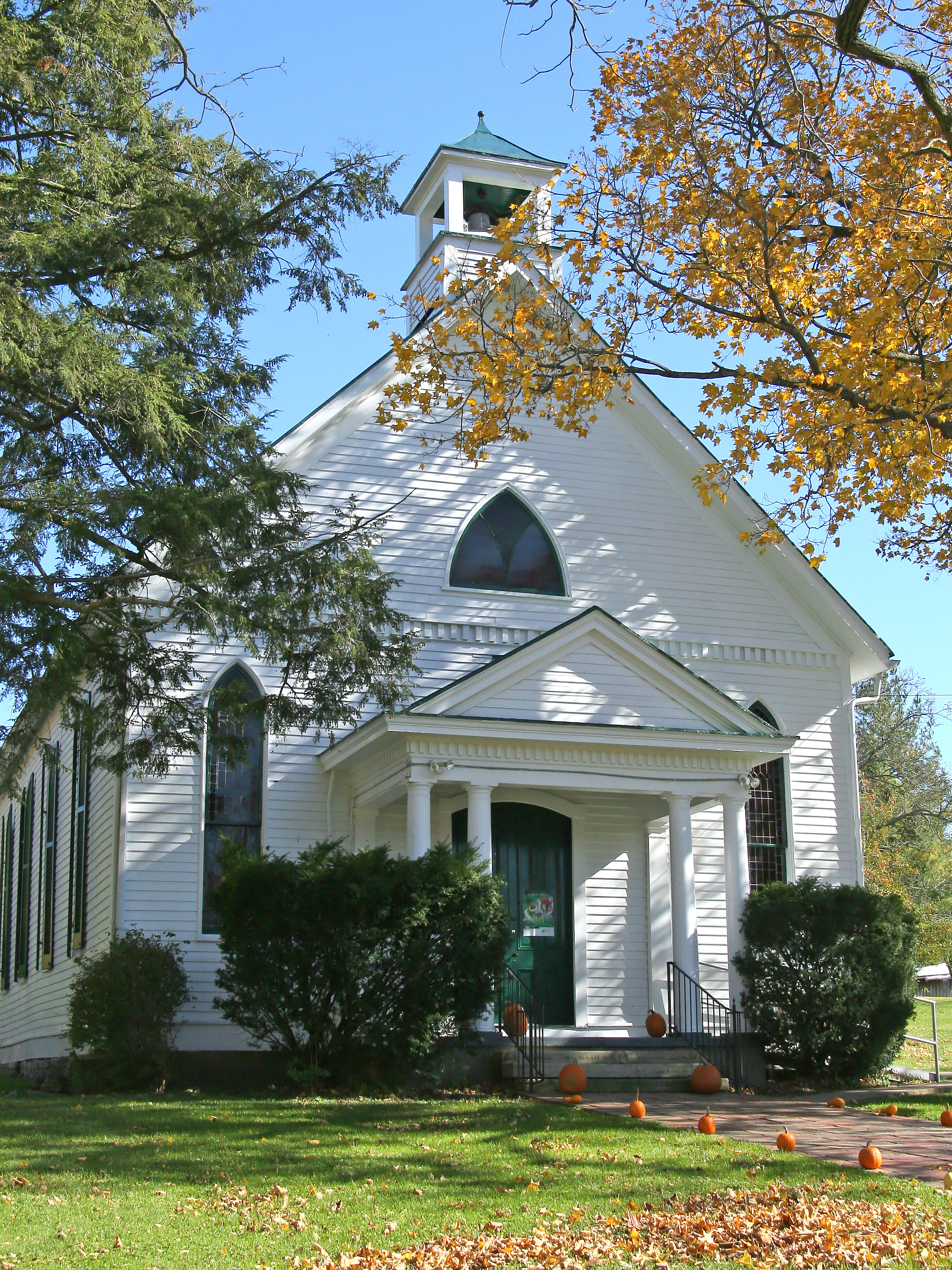
Washington Presbyterian Church built in 1870

Washington was founded in 1786 by Arthur Fox, a Revolutionary War soldier from Virginia, and William Wood, a Baptist preacher, also from Virginia. The first trustees included Daniel Boone. The land on which it was laid out was purchased by Fox and Wood from Simon Kenton, the original explorer and settler of the area who at that time lived close by. The town was founded as Washington, Virginia, since in 1786 Kentucky did not yet exist as a separate state. It is believed that Washington is the first settlement named for George Washington.

Many of the original settlers were revolutionary war veterans, and 17 such veterans are known to be buried in Washington. The 1790 Census listed 462 residents, including 21 slaves, thus the town was the second largest in the future state of Kentucky. Only Lexington was larger. One of the early settlers was Captain Thomas Marshall, a revolutionary war soldier and brother of John Marshall, who later became Chief Justice. Captain Marshall's father and mother later joined him in Washington and they all lived and eventually died at the Marshall Home, which is still standing on Green Street.

The first post office in the region was established in Washington in 1789. This post office initially served the whole Northwest Territory including Ohio, Indiana, Illinois, Wisconsin, and Minnesota. The third postmaster was William Murphy, who built a large house which is still standing (the Murphy-Lashbrooke-Wood-Moose House) on Old Main Street. The original post office was in the front yard but was torn down in 1948.

Thornton Blackburn was a slave of William Murphy and lived in his house between 1815 and 1824. He later moved to Hardinsburg, Kentucky and then Louisville, from which he escaped with his wife to Detroit. In Detroit, he was arrested as a fugitive slave but after a riot he and his wife escaped to Canada, across the Detroit River. While Canada did not accept slavery, it did return criminals to the US. His owners tried to get him back from Canada by arguing in a Canadian court that he was a criminal for having escaped and participated in the Detroit Riot. However, they lost this case which also established the precedent that it would be very difficult to show that escaped slaves charged as criminals in the US had done sufficiently serious crimes for them to be returned to the US as slaves. Thus Thornton's case confirmed that escaped slaves were free and safe once they got to Canada and that it was a safe terminus for the underground railroad. Also this was the first piece of refugee law ever established on Canadian soil and is foundational to Canadian extradition law today. After confirming his freedom in Canada, Thornton moved to Toronto, where he set up the first horse-drawn taxi service and was moderately affluent. Even today the Toronto City Public Transport uses the colors, yellow and red, that Thornton established for his taxi service.

Washington achieved national attention in 1830 when on May 27 President Andrew Jackson vetoed a bill passed by Congress which would have allowed the Federal Government to purchase stock in the Maysville-Washington-Lexington Turnpike Road Company. (This is the so-called Maysville Road Veto.) This road would have connected Lexington with Washington and the Ohio River at Maysville and would have been part of the national Cumberland Road System. However, President Jackson saw it purely as an intrastate road benefiting the state of his rival, Henry Clay, and vetoed it.

In 1833, Washington had a visitor who would become famous, Harriet Beecher, who after her marriage was known as Harriet Beecher Stowe. At the time of her visit, she was still Harriet Beecher and teaching at the Western Female Institute in Cincinnati. She came to Washington to visit a student, Elizabeth Key, and saw a slave auction in front of the old courthouse in Washington. This auction and her other experiences with slavery led her to write Uncle Tom's Cabin, which has a number of references to Washington. The character of Topsy in Uncle Tom's Cabin is thought to be modeled on a woman who lived in Washington, initially as a slave and then as a free person, Jane Anderson. The Key House where Harriet Beecher Stowe stayed is on Main Street in Washington and now contains a museum named the Harriet Beecher Stowe Slavery to Freedom Museum.

In 1803, Albert Sidney Johnston was born in Washington, probably its most famous native. His father, Dr. John Johnston, was a physician and a native of Salisbury, Conn while his mother was from the Washington area. Johnston was educated at West Point. He served in the US Army 1826–1834 and then resigned and went first to Kentucky and then Texas. He served in the Army of the Republic of Texas from 1836 to 1840, rising to be senior brigadier general in command of the Army of Texas in 1837 and then Secretary of War for Texas in 1838. He later returned to the US Army serving in the Mexican–American War and the Utah War before taking command of the US Army Department of the Pacific in California. In 1861 he resigned from the US Army to join the Confederacy and was appointed commander of the Western Department. He died at the Battle of Shiloh on April 6, 1862. His house in Washington is largely unchanged from when he lived there and is now a museum.

Following largely in the footsteps of General Johnston was General William "Bull" Nelson. His father, Dr. Thomas Nelson, was also a doctor in Washington; he lived in the same house in Washington that Johnston had lived in and attended the same church (Washington Presbyterian). Nelson also went to West Point but when the war broke out he sided with the Union. He was on the opposite side at the Battle of Shiloh when Johnston was killed and was himself shot and killed by a fellow Union Officer later in 1862.

Charles William Forman (1821–1894), the founder of Forman Christian College University in Lahore, Pakistan (now known as FCCU), was also a native of Washington. He went to Princeton Theological School and then was sent in 1847 by the Washington Presbyterian Church and the Ebenezer Presbytery to be a missionary in India. He ended up in the Punjab where he established the first English-speaking school which developed into one of Pakistan's leading universities. Among its graduates are two Presidents of Pakistan (Farooq Ahmed Leghari and Pervez Musharraf) and one prime minister of Pakistan (Chaudhry Shujaat Hussain) and one of India (Inder Kumar Gujral). He also had 10 children by two wives, of whom five were missionaries to India. The ruins of the old Forman Home are still visible on a golf course in Washington. The Washington Presbyterian Church, which sponsored Charles Forman, still exists although the current building dates from 1871.

Other noteworthy people who lived in Washington during the first half of the 1800s include Lorrin Andrews, who taught school in Washington, married a local girl, Mary Wilson, and went on to found what became the University of Hawaii. Also, Zachary Taylor was briefly a military recruiter in Washington before going on to his successful military career and becoming the 12th President of the United States.

The importance of Washington began to diminish in the 1840s as Maysville, which was on the Ohio River, replaced it as the largest town and in 1848 replaced it as the county seat of Mason County. The town has grown little since the 1840s. Much of the old part of Washington remains as it did in the late 18th century and early 19th century, with many log cabins remaining. There are five museums including the Albert Sidney Johnson/Bull Nelson House, the Marshall Key House where Harriet Beecher Stowe stayed when she saw the slave auction and a 1787 log cabin called Mefford's Fort. Washington has a historic district listed on the National Register of Historic Places.

Washington was annexed by the City of Maysville in 1990.

== Notable people ==
- Thornton Blackburn (1812–1890), escaped slave whose case confirmed Canada as a safe haven for escaping slaves
- David Horace Clift (1907–-1972), notable librarian and chief executive of the American Library Association
- Charles William Forman (1821–1894), missionary and founder of Forman Christian College University (FCCU) in Lahore, Pakistan
- Albert Sidney Johnston (1803–1862), Commander of the Army of the Republic of Texas, Secretary of War for Texas, Commander of the Western Department for the Confederacy. Died at the Battle of Shiloh
