= S. Azmat Hassan =

Pakistani diplomat and academic (1944–2020)

Syed Azmat Hassan
- Born: 7 August 1944
- Died: 13 January 2020
- Education: BA, University of the Punjab (1963); MA, University of Cambridge (1966); MSc, Quaid-i-Azam University (1984)
- Occupations: Diplomat; academic
- Employers: Pakistani Foreign Ministry; School of Diplomacy and International Relations, Seton Hall University; Lahore University of Management Sciences
- Known for: Ambassadorships to Malaysia, Syria, and Morocco; academic work in Middle Eastern studies

Syed Azmat Hassan (Urdu: سید عزمت حسن; 7 August 1944 – 13 January 2020) was a Pakistani diplomat and academic. He served as Ambassador of Pakistan to Malaysia, Syria, and Morocco during a 33-year career in the Pakistani Foreign Service, and subsequently taught at the School of Diplomacy and International Relations at Seton Hall University and the Lahore University of Management Sciences (LUMS). He was the second son of Syed Fida Hassan, a Pakistani bureaucrat who served as chairman of the Pakistan Cricket Board between 1963 and 1969.

== Education ==
Hassan attended St. Anthony's High School in Lahore. In 1963 he was awarded a BA in economics, political science, and history by the University of the Punjab. In 1966 he obtained an MA in economics from the University of Cambridge. He later gained an MSc in strategic studies from Quaid-i-Azam University, Islamabad, in 1984.

== Diplomatic career ==
Hassan joined the Foreign Service of Pakistan as a career diplomat in 1966. His 33-year diplomatic career included ambassadorships to Malaysia, Syria (with concurrent responsibility for Lebanon), and Morocco, as well as service as Deputy Permanent Representative of Pakistan to the United Nations in New York from 1979 to 1980. At the Pakistani Foreign Ministry he served as Additional Secretary for foreign affairs and defence, head of the Middle East desk, and director-general of the Afghanistan Division. He also served as Additional Secretary in the Prime Minister's Secretariat during the tenures of both Nawaz Sharif and Benazir Bhutto.

At the 1991 Food and Agriculture Organization conference in Rome, Hassan represented Pakistan as Additional Secretary. In 1994 he was elected a joint vice-chairman at a conference convened by the International Atomic Energy Agency to adopt the Convention on Nuclear Safety.

== Academic career ==
Following his retirement from the foreign service, Hassan taught at several universities in the United States, including Seton Hall University, Columbia University, Rutgers University, and Caldwell College, as well as at LUMS in Lahore. He joined the School of Diplomacy and International Relations at Seton Hall in autumn 2000 as an adjunct professor, teaching courses on the modern Middle East and Afghanistan and representing the school at conferences. From 2006 he was associated with LUMS, initially as an adjunct faculty member and subsequently as full-time visiting faculty.

== Role in the Lawyers' Movement ==
In 2008, Hassan was one of 26 former Pakistani ambassadors who were co-signatories to a letter addressed to the newly formed federal government demanding the immediate restoration of judges who had been deposed during the Lawyers' Movement. The signatories expressed regret at the delay in abiding by the Murree Declaration and argued that restoration of the judges need not be linked to constitutional amendments to reform the judiciary.

== Other affiliations ==
Hassan served as Senior Adviser on the Board of Sponsors of the Center for War/Peace Studies. He was also affiliated with the Global Peace Foundation and served on the boards of the New Jersey Division of UNA-USA and the Center for UN Reform Education.

== Publications and presentations ==
Hassan contributed articles on international affairs to HuffPost. He also contributed to the Daily Record (New Jersey), the Star-Ledger (New Jersey), and Dawn (Pakistan). He was also a commentator on international affairs for television and radio.

Selected publications and presentations include:

- "The United Nations in an Era of Globalisation", essay in Multilateral Diplomacy and the United Nations Today, edited by James P. Muldoon Jr. et al., 2nd ed., Westview Press, 2005.
- "Some Reflections on Pakistan", keynote essay in Home and the World: South Asia in Transition, Cambridge Scholars Press. (Written in response to Shashi Tharoor's opening keynote at the 2005 Conference on South Asia at Rutgers University.)
- "Progress of the United States–Pakistani Coalition Against Terrorism", guest lecture at the Guarini Center for Governmental Affairs, Pope Lecture Hall, Saint Peter's University, 23 September 2004.
- "Mourning the Loss of Life at One of the World's Largest Bases", HuffPost, November 2009.
- "Countering Violent Extremism: The Fate of the Tamil Tigers", EastWest Institute, New York, 14 May 2009.
- "Diplomacy in the Syrian Civil War", HuffPost, November 2013.
- "Saudi Arabia Spurns Its UN Security Council Seat", HuffPost, October 2013.
- "Faith and Diversity: Toward a Global Ethic for Inclusive and Moderate Societies", presentation at the Global Peace Convention, Kuala Lumpur, Malaysia, 6 December 2013.
- "UN Conference on Syria", HuffPost, January 2014.
- "General Sisi of Egypt to Contest Presidential Elections", HuffPost, March 2014.
- "Saudi Arabia Versus Iran", HuffPost, June 2014.
- "ISIS' Military Successes in Iraq", HuffPost, June 2014.
- "Electing Afghanistan's New President", HuffPost, July 2014.
- "ISIS and U.S.–Iran Relations", HuffPost, October 2014.
- "Cracking the ISIS Conundrum: Obama and the Arab World", HuffPost, December 2014.
- "Nuclear Negotiations Between the West and Iran", HuffPost, November 2014.
- "P5 Plus 1 – Iran Nuclear Accord", HuffPost, April 2015.
- "Islamic State of Iraq and Levant (ISIS)", presentation, 22 October 2014.
- "Faith and Action at the Crossroads: The Role of Faith Leaders in the Public Square Today", lecture at the Global Peace Leadership Conference, Washington, D.C., September 2013.
