= Charles William Forman =

American minister and missionary (1821–1894)

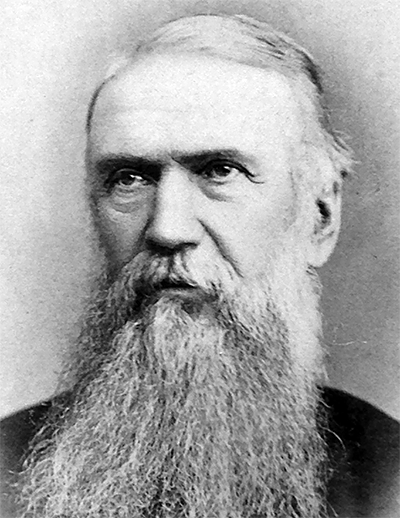
Charles William Forman

Charles William Forman (1821–1894) was an American Presbyterian minister, missionary and the founder of Forman Christian College, a private university in then Lahore, colonial India (now in Pakistan).

== Early life ==
Charles William Forman was born on March 3, 1821, in Washington, Kentucky, United States. After entering the family business manufacturing hemp, he was converted at a revival meeting when he was twenty years old. He felt burdened for the salvation of slaves on Kentucky plantations and tried to establish a ministry for them, but without success. He attended Centre College in Kentucky and then Princeton Theological Seminary in New Jersey. He was ordained as a Presbyterian minister on July 7, 1847, and on the same day started his journey to India as a missionary under the Presbyterian Foreign Mission Board.

== Settling in Lahore ==
Charles William Forman arrived in India in 1847 and two years later settled in Lahore in north India (now Pakistan). He was the founder of the Rang Mahal School in Lahore, the first Anglo-vernacular school in the northern British India province of Punjab. This school added a college department in 1865, which was later known as Forman Christian College. Forman was very influential in developing the educational system of the Punjab area. He served on nearly every committee on education appointed by the Punjab government during his lifetime.

== Preaching Christianity ==
According to the Biographical Dictionary of Christian Missions, Forman was theologically conservative, but "favored adaptation of Christianity to Indian custom on matters such as polygamy and he wrote appreciatively of the Sikhs and their founder. He was a friend of all, walking the streets to and from school and talking with the people daily for forty years." Charles William Forman's first wife was Margaret Newton, with whom he had seven children, including Henry Forman. Following the death of Margaret, Charles married Georgina Lockhart, with whom he had three children, two surviving. Charles' children Henry, John, Charles, Mary, and Emily all became Presbyterian missionaries to India.

== Death ==
Charles died on August 27, 1894, in Lahore.
