= Rang Mahal School =

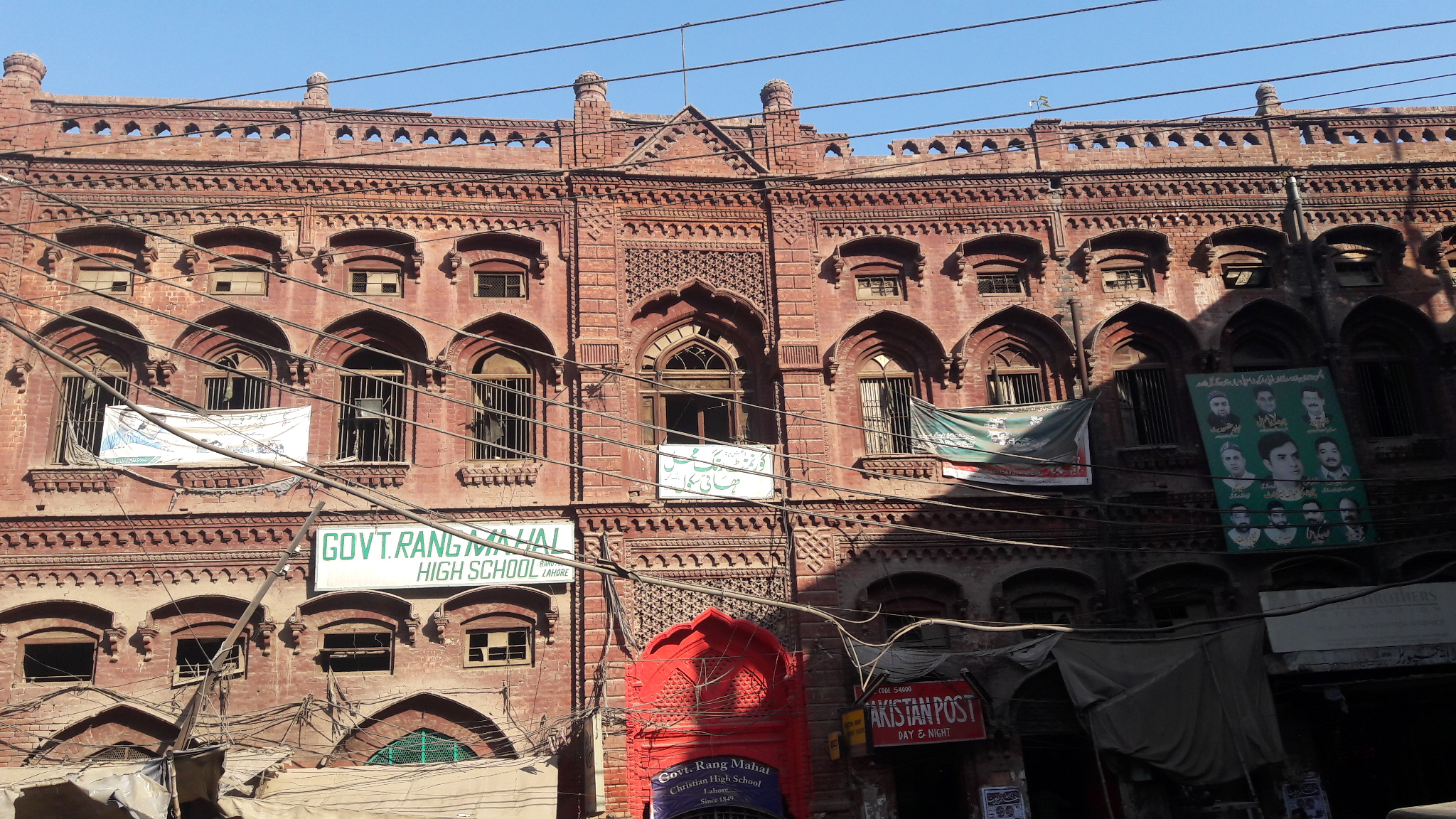

Location
- Shah Alam Rd, Qadimi Shehr, Lahore; Pakistan
- Coordinates: 31°34′56″N 74°19′08″E

Information
- Former name: Lahore Mission School
- Type: Public
- Religious affiliation(s): Presbyterian (formerly)
- Established: 19 December 1849
- Founders: Charles William Forman; John Newton

Rang Mahal School, officially known as Government Rang Mahal High School, formerly known as Rang Mahal Mission School, is a government school located in Lahore, Punjab, Pakistan.

== History ==
Rang Mahal School was founded by Charles William Forman and John Newton on 19 December 1849 as Lahore Mission School. It was the first English-medium school in northern India at the time of its establishment. Initially, the classes of the school were started under a tree with three students of Kashmiri ancestry. The school was later shifted to Rang Mahal in 1852, a mahal that was previously owned by Saadullah Khan, a grand wazir of Emperor Shah Jahan, but was acquired by the mission to establish a school.

The school was nationalized by the Government of Pakistan in 1972. Formerly, it was under the administration of Presbyterian Education Trust.

== Alumni ==
- Syed Fida Hassan
- Kailash Nath Katju
