= Syed Fida Hassan =

Chairman of the Pakistan Cricket Board
- In office 1963–1969

Personal details
- Spouse: Zeenat Hussain
- Children: S. Azmat Hassan

Syed Fida Hassan was a Pakistani bureaucrat and administrator who served as the Chairman of the Pakistan Cricket Board (PCB) between 1963 and 1969.

== Life and career ==
Syed Fida Hassan was born on December 4, 1908, in Dera Ghazi Khan. He was educated at the Rang Mahal Mission School and Government College, Lahore. He was admitted to the Indian Civil Service and was educated at the Oriel College, Oxford.

In 1954, he was appointed as the manager of Pakistan national cricket team for the tour of England.

== Personal life ==
Syed Fida Hassan married Zeenat Hussain in 1934 who served as a member on a reserved women's seat in the Punjab Legislative Assembly from 1951 to 1955, and in the West Pakistan Assembly up to 1958. Her daughter, Anjum Niaz, was an American-Pakistani journalist who worked for Dawn.
