= Rivers and Harbors Bill =

The Rivers and Harbors Bill was a bill passed by Congress in 1846 to provide $500,000 to improve rivers and harbors. When the Senate passed the Rivers and Harbors Bill 34 to 16 on July 24, 1846, opponents lobbied for a presidential veto. It was vetoed by President James K. Polk on August 3. The bill would have provided for federally funded internal improvements on small harbors, many of them on the Great Lakes. Polk believed that this was unconstitutional because the bill unfairly favored particular areas, including that which had no foreign trade.

Polk believed that these problems were local and not national. Polk feared that passing the Rivers and Harbors Bill would encourage legislators to compete for favors for their home districts, a type of political corruption that would spell doom to the virtue of the republic. In this regard he followed his hero, Andrew Jackson, who authored the Maysville Road veto in 1830 on similar grounds. Henry Clay and his Whig Party, by contrast, supported the bill because they believed the national government had a responsibility to promote trade commerce and economic modernization.
