= Maysville Road veto =

1830 US presidential action

Maysville Road Veto
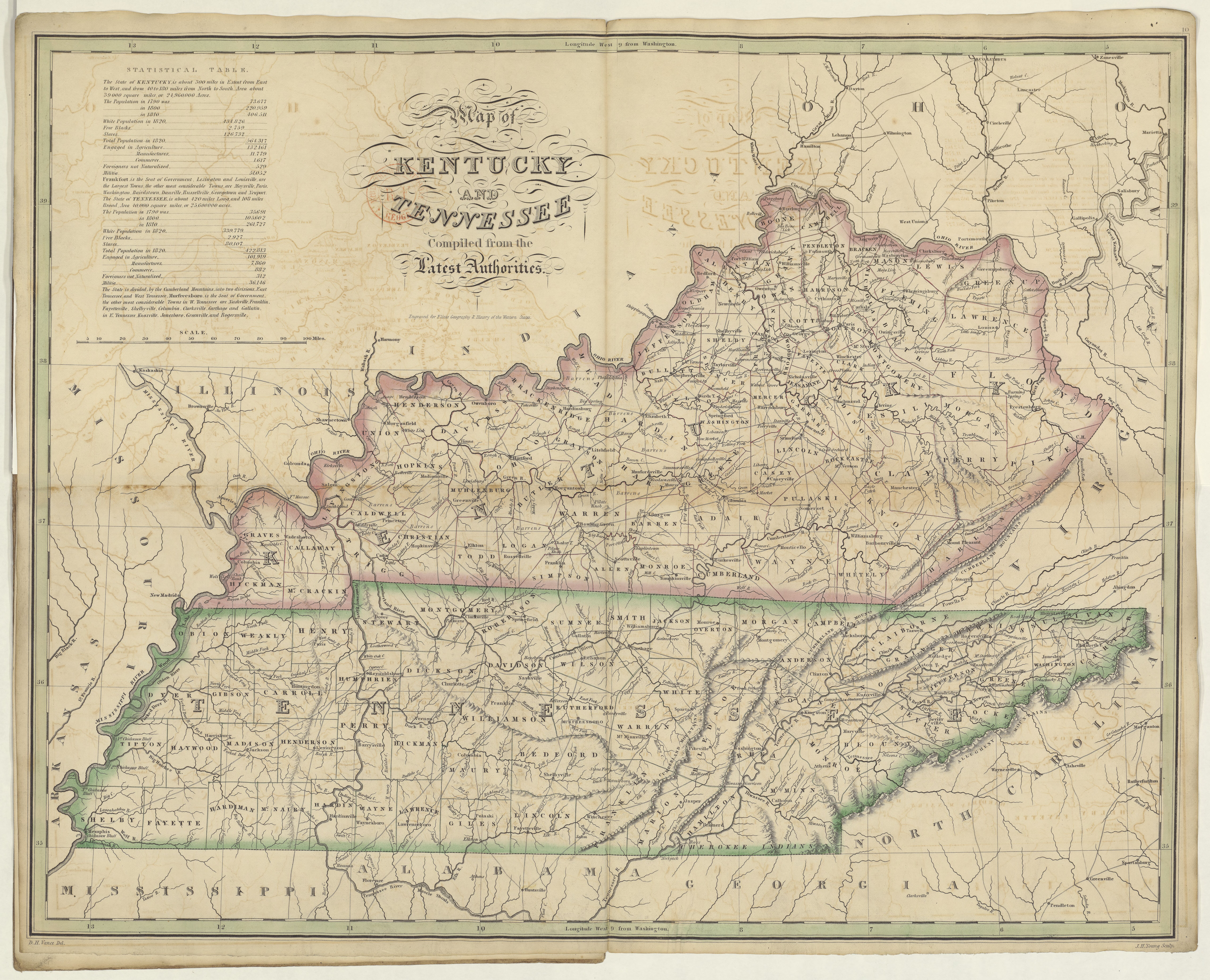
- Kentucky and Tennessee, published in A Condensed Geography and History of the Western States (1828)
- Date: May 27, 1830
- Location: Washington, D.C., U.S.
- Participants: Andrew Jackson; Martin Van Buren; Henry Clay
- Outcome: Defeat of federal stock subscription for the Maysville, Washington, Paris, and Lexington Turnpike Road Company; Precedent limiting federal infrastructure funding strictly to interstate projects; Fiscal focus on retiring the national debt; Polarization contributing to the formation of the Whig Party

The Maysville Road veto occurred on May 27, 1830, when United States President Andrew Jackson vetoed a bill that would allow the federal government to purchase stock in the Maysville, Washington, Paris, and Lexington Turnpike Road Company, which had been organized to construct a road linking Lexington, Kentucky, to Maysville on the Ohio River (Maysville being located approximately 66 miles/106 km northeast of Lexington), the entirety of which would be in the state of Kentucky. Its advocates regarded it as a part of the national Cumberland Road system. Congress passed a bill in 1830 providing federal funds to complete the project. Jackson vetoed the bill on the grounds that federal funding of intrastate projects of this nature was unconstitutional. He declared that such bills violated the principle that the federal government should not be involved in local economic affairs. Jackson also pointed out that funding for these kinds of projects interfered with paying off the national debt.

Proponents of internal improvements, such as the development of roads and bridges, argued that the federal government had an obligation to harmonize the nation's diverse, and often conflicting, sectional interests into an "American System." Jackson's decision was heavily influenced by his Secretary of State Martin Van Buren. Some authors have described the motives behind the veto decision as personal, rather than strictly political. The veto has been attributed to a personal grudge against Henry Clay, a political enemy and resident of Kentucky, as well as to preserve the trade monopoly of New York's Erie Canal, in Van Buren's case.

== Debate in Congress ==
Supporters of the bill insisted on the project's national significance. This particular project was intended to be a part of a much larger interstate system extending from Zanesville, Ohio, to Florence, Alabama. If the highway as a whole was of national significance, they argued, surely the individual sections must be as well. They looked to the Supreme Court decision handed down six years before in Gibbons v. Ogden, in which the court confirmed the power to regulate commerce among the states including those portions of the journey which lay within one state or another. Additionally, the road connected the interior of Kentucky to the Ohio River, and therefore served as the main artery for the transportation of goods. Kentucky Representative Robert Letcher made this argument regarding the road's connection to the rest of the nation:

The road designed to be improved is intended to intersect at the great national road in the State of Ohio. It connects itself also on each side with the Ohio River. These two connections most certainly and justly entitle it to the appellation of a national work.

Moreover, the federal government had provided funding for other intrastate projects when they benefited the rest of the nation. As Representative Coleman stated:

But gentlemen say, every inch of the Maysville road is in the State of Kentucky. How can it be national? I answer, every inch of the Delaware Canal, sixteen miles in length, is in the State of New Jersey; and every inch of the Louisville Canal is in one county; nay, I believe in one city. How can they be national? Yet, Congress have subscribed for stock in both of them.

These arguments were all intended to illustrate the road's overwhelming national significance. Opponents responded that this line of argument would establish that every road was a national road; there would be no limit to federal power.

== Jackson's veto ==
Jackson believed that federal money should only be spent when carrying out Congress' enumerated powers. President Thomas Jefferson employed a broad view of the spending power when he carried out the Louisiana Purchase and the construction of the Cumberland Road. In contrast, President James Madison, the "Father of the Constitution”, viewed this type of spending as unconstitutional, as evidenced by his veto of the Bonus Bill of 1817. Jackson sided with Madison's view and felt that Jefferson's broad view of the spending power was not enough to justify passage of the bill before him. One of Jackson's main arguments against the bill was the project's provincial nature. It was understood that Congress could only fund projects which benefited the nation as a whole, but the Maysville project was a "purely local matter:"

It has no connection with any established system of improvements; is exclusively within the limits of a State, starting at a point on the Ohio River and running out 60 miles to an interior town, and even as far as the State is interested conferring partial instead of general advantages.

Jackson was quick to clarify that this did not imply that he would approve of projects which were of "national" character. Even though there is not a constitutional argument to be made against this type of action, it would be unwise to do so at the time, given the public debt. Until the debt was paid off, there would be no surplus to spend on these projects.

Generally, Jackson supported internal improvements. During his first term, he sanctioned federal expenditures for transportation projects at a rate nearly double that of the expenditures under President John Quincy Adams. It was seen as good policy to spend federal money on national improvements, as long as two conditions were met. First, they should be done pursuant to a general system of improvement, not by ad hoc legislation. Second, the Constitution should be amended to make clear the limits on federal power.

Some scholars argue that Jackson's veto can be seen as largely driven by personal, rather than political motives, particularly given Jackson's approval of internal improvement bills with as much a local nature as the Maysville Road. Jackson's veto may have been one of the many manifestations of the rivalry between Jackson and Henry Clay, who was one of the major proponents of the Maysville Road as part of his American System.

Because the Maysville Road Project was of a local nature, the veto did not encounter resounding opposition in Congress. In fact, the veto would please voters in New York and Pennsylvania who were responsible for financing their own projects, and saw no reason to help fund similar projects in other states. It also appealed to Southern states' rights supporters who had no need for canals or new roads. For Jackson, this decision underscored his belief that the construction of roads and canals lay more within the realm of the states rather than the federal government. This belief in limiting the federal government's scope of action was to be one of the tenets of Jacksonian democracy.

In 1846 President James K. Polk, an admirer and follower of Jackson, vetoed the Rivers and Harbors Bill on similar grounds. Henry Clay and his Whig Party, in contrast to Jackson, supported both the 1830 and 1846 bills because they believed the national government had a responsibility to promote trade commerce and economic modernization.

== U.S. Route 68 ==
While Henry Clay and the Whig Party lost the argument, the two positions represented by the Maysville Road veto continued to face each other into the future. A route that closely approximated the surveyed right-of-way for the Maysville and Lexington Turnpike received substantial federal aid in the 20th century and would be designated as part of U.S. Route 68. This aid and designation represented a reversal of the principles set forth by Jackson in his 1830 veto.
