= List of state highways in Kentucky (1–999) =

The following is a list of state highways in Kentucky with numbers between 1 and 999.

== 1–99 ==
Number	Southern or western terminus	Northern or eastern terminus	Notes
KY 1	KY 3 near Fallsburg	US 23 in Greenup	
KY 2	US 60 in Olive Hill	KY 2541 in Greenup	
KY 3	US 23 / US 460 / KY 1100 near Auxier	US 23 near Catlettsburg	Established 1929
KY 4	KY 80 in Belcher	Virginia State Line	Removed 1947 and replaced by US 460
KY 4	Complete loop in Lexington		Established 1966
KY 5	US 60 in Princess	US 23 near Bellefonte	
KY 6	KY 26 in Woodbine	KY 11 / KY 459 in Barbourville	
KY 7	KY 15 in Jeff	East First Ave in South Shore	Established 1929
KY 8	KY 237 near Taylorsport	US 62 in Maysville	
KY 8	KY 57 / KY 3550 in Concord	US 23 at South Portsmouth	
KY 9	KY 1 / KY 7 near Grayson	KY 8 in Newport	Established 1929
KY 10	KY 915 near Alexandria	SR 253 near Franklin Furnace, OH	Established 1929
KY 11	KY 92 near Williamsburg	US 62 / KY 10 in Maysville	Established 1929
KY 12	Mt. Olivet	Maysville	Removed 1930 and replaced by US 62
KY 12	KY 43 near Shelbyville	Franklin-Henry County line	
KY 13	Bourbon-Nicholas County line	KY 36 in Carlisle	
KY 14	US 42 / US 127 near Verona	KY 177 in Morning View	Established 1929
KY 15	US 119 in Whitesburg	US 60 in Winchester	Established 1929
KY 16	US 127 in Glencoe	KY 17 in Covington	Established 1929
KY 17	US 27 near Falmouth	Theodore M. Berry Way in Cincinnati, OH	Established 1929
KY 18	KY 338 near Rabbit Hash	KY 1017 in Florence	
KY 19	US 62 near Claysville	KY 8 in Augusta	Established 1929
KY 20	KY 18 near Belleview	KY 8 near Constance	
KY 21	KY 52 near Paint Lick	Madison-Jackson County line	Established 1929
KY 22	US 42 in Louisville	KY 10 near Powersville	Established 1929
KY 24	US 62 in Sardis	KY 2 in Carter	Removed 1974 and split into three and renumbered KY 324, KY 344, and KY 474 to avoid duplication with I-24
KY 26	US 25W near Williamsburg	US 25W in Corbin	
KY 28	KY 11 / KY 30 in Booneville	KY 15 near Hazard	
KY 29	Lock Seven Road in High Bridge	US 27 Bus. / KY 39 in Nicholasville	Established 1929
KY 30	Hal Rogers Parkway / KY 354 in London	US 460 / KY 7 near Salyersville	
KY 32	US 62 / US 460 in Georgetown	KY 3 in Louisa	Established 1929
KY 33	US 127 / US 150 / KY 34 / KY 52 in Danville	US 62 in Versailles	Established 1929
KY 34	US 68 / KY 52 near Gravel Switch	Old US 27 near Bryantsville	Established 1929
KY 35	US 127 near Sparta	US 42 in Warsaw	Established 1929
KY 36	US 421 in Milton	US 460 in Frenchburg	
KY 37	Ohio state line	US 60 in Frankfort	Established 1929 and removed 1950. Became part of US 421
KY 37	KY 243 near Gravel Switch	US 127 Byp. / US 150 Byp. in Danville	Established 1950
KY 38	US 421 in Harlan	SR 624 near Keokee, VA	
KY 39	KY 1247 in Somerset	KY 563 near Kentucky River	No crossing of Kentucky River
KY 39	Kentucky River	US 27 Bus. / KY 29 in Nicholasville	Established 1929. No crossing of Kentucky River
KY 40	US 460 / KY 7 in Salyersville	Kermit, WV	Established 1929
KY 43	US 421 near Pleasureville	KY 55 Bus. / KY 2268 near Shelbyville	
KY 44	US 31W / US 60 north of West Point	US 62 / US 127 in Lawrenceburg	
KY 46	KY 52 near Nelsonville	KY 49 near Greenbrier	
KY 47	KY 36 / KY 467 in Sanders	US 42 in Ghent	
KY 48	US 31E / US 150 in Highgrove	US 62 / KY 55 in Bloomfield	
KY 49	US 150 in Bardstown	KY 70 in Liberty	
KY 50	US 51 in Bardwell	US 60 in Lexington	Established 1929 and removed 1950. Bardwell to Frankfort became part of US 62 in 1930; rest became part of US 421
KY 50	KY 512 west of Alton Station	KY 395 west of Alton Station	Established 1950 and removed 1955. Became part of KY 512. Old route of KY 512 is now Benson Creek Road
KY 50	Armstrong Mill Road in Lexington	Palumbo Drive east of Lexington	Established 1973 and removed 1980
KY 52	US 62 in Boston	KY 30 near Jackson	
KY 53	KY 555 near Willisburg	US 42 in Oldham County	
KY 54	KY 2831 in Owensboro	US 62 in Leitchfield	
KY 55	US 127 in Freedom	US 42 / KY 36 in Prestonville	
KY 56	IL 13 near Old Shawneetown, IL	KY 81 near Owensboro	
KY 57	KY 4 in Lexington	KY 8 in Concord	
KY 58	Columbus	US 68 near Briensburg	
KY 59	KY 2 near Olive Hill	KY 8 in Vanceburg	
KY 61	SR 53 near Peytonsburg	US 31E / US 60 in Louisville	
KY 63	US 31E Bus. in Glasgow	SR 56 south of Gamaliel	
KY 64	US 60 east of Cloverport	US 31W in Radcliff	Removed 1962 and became part of KY 144 to avoid duplication with I-64
KY 65	US 60 in Harned	US 68 in Hays	Removed 1962 and became part of KY 259 to avoid duplication with I-65; northern portion now part of KY 79
KY 66	US 119 in Hyden	Virginia border	Removed 1950 and became part of US 421
KY 66	KY 11 near Oneida	US 25E in Pineville	Established 1950 and the former portion of KY 21 that was renumbered because of US 421
KY 67	KY 185 / KY 1749	US 68 in Bowling Green	Established 1929 and removed 1969. Became part of KY 185
KY 67	I-64 near Grayson	KY 3105 in Wurtland	Established 2000
KY 69	Bluff Lane near Central City	Indiana State Road 237 in Hawesville	
KY 70	US 60 in Smithland	US 150 in Broahead	
KY 71	US 60 in Owensboro	US 31E in Scottsville	Established 1929 and removed 1952. Became part of US 231
KY 71	KY 80 west of Bush	KY 229 north of Bailey Switch	Established 1952 and removed 1962. Former KY 231; renumbered KY 1803 to avoid duplication with I-71
KY 72	US 119 near Blackmont	Rockhouse Branch Rd near Alva	
KY 72	Pansy	KY 413 in Baxter	
KY 73	US 31 in Horse Cave	Tennessee border	Established 1929 and removed 1931. Became part of US 31W
KY 73	White Road near Franklin	KY 1038 north of Auburn	Established 1931
KY 74	SR 90 in Pruden	US 25E in Middlesboro	
KY 75	US 60 in Owensboro	Tennessee state line	Established 1929 and removed 1954. Became part of US 431
KY 75	US 421 in McKee	KY 490 in Lamero	Established 1954 and removed 1962. Became part of KY 89 to avoid duplication with I-75
KY 76	KY 70 east of Campbellsville	Lake Cumberland	
KY 77	KY 11 / KY 15 near Slade	US 460 southeast of Frenchburg	
KY 78	KY 49 in rural Casey County	US 150 near Stanford	
KY 79	US 31W & KY 100 in Franklin	Tennessee border	Removed 1944 and renumbered KY 383 when US 79 extended into Kentucky
KY 79	US 431 in Russellville	SR 135 near Brandenburg	Established 1966 as an extension of US 79; this road replaced part of KY 105, part of KY 108, and part of KY 448
KY 80	KY 58 in Columbus	SR 80 east of Elkhorn City	
KY 81	US 431 in South Carrollton	KY 54 / KY 2831 in Owensboro	
KY 82	US 23 in Pikeville	West Virginia border in Williamson	Established 1929 and removed 1934. Became part of US 119
KY 82	KY 89 southwest of Clay City	KY 15 in Clay City	Established 1934
KY 83	KY 55 south of Lockport	Carrollton	Removed 1945 and renumbered KY 389
KY 83	KY 303 / KY 2422 near Cuba	KY 94 near Lynnville	Established 1945
KY 84	KY 401 near Hudson	KY 49 / KY 52 in Lebanon	
KY 85	KY 70 near Madisonville	US 62 near Rockport	
KY 86	KY 144 in Union Star	US 62 near Cecilia	
KY 87	Akersville Road in Allen County	US 31E in Lucas	
KY 88	US 62 in Clarkson	KY 61 near Greensburg	
KY 89	KY 490 near Livingston	KY 627 in Winchester	
KY 90	I-65 / KY 70 in Cave City	US 25W northwest of Williamsburg	
KY 91	US 68 / KY 80 in Hopkinsville	IL 1 near Cave-in-Rock, IL	
KY 92	KY 55 in Joppa	Jamestown Marina Resort	
KY 92	Beaver Creek Resort	US 25E in Hosman	
KY 93	KY 139 / KY 276 in rural Lyon County	KY 810 / KY 819 near Eddyville	
KY 93	KY 917 near Iuka	KY 453 in rural Livingston County	
KY 94	SR 78 near Tyler	KY 80 near Aurora	
KY 95	US 68 in Palma	Haddox Ferry Road in Calvert City	
KY 96	KY 102 in Keysburg	US 431 in Russellville	
KY 97	SR 69 south of Sedalia	KY 80 / KY 121 / KY 121 Bus. near Mayfield	
KY 98	KY 123 near Columbus	US 68 in Aurora	Removed 1954 and became part of KY 80
KY 98	KY 100 in Scottsville	KY 100 near Fountain Run	Established 1954
KY 99	SR 10 south of Holland	KY 100 in Holland	

== 100–199 ==
Number	Southern or western terminus	Northern or eastern terminus	Notes
KY 100	US 79 near Russellville	KY 90 in Waterview	
KY 101	KY 100 in Scottsville	KY 259 in Rhoda	
KY 102	Red River at the Tennessee state line	US 68 Bus. in Elkton	
KY 103	KY 100 in Middleton	KY 79 at Chandlers Chapel	
KY 104	Kentucky–Tennessee state line north of Clarksville	KY 181 south of Elkton	
KY 105	KY 79 / KY 2201 west of Axtel	US 60 Bus. in Cloverport	
KY 106	KY 181 in Elkton	KY 70 in Huntsville	
KY 107	Artillery Road / Patton Road at Fort Campbell	US 431 in Lewisburg	
KY 108	Glen Dean–McQuady Road at Glen Dean	KY 261 near Kirk	
KY 109	KY 56 in Union	KY 115 northeast of Oak Grove	
KY 110	Laurel Branch Camping Area on the shore of Rough River Lake	KY 259 near McDaniels	
KY 110	KY 54 at Shreve	Rough River Lake near Fentress McMahan	
KY 111	US 60 east of Owingsville	KY 32 southeast of Flemingsburg	
KY 112	US 62 southwest of Ilsley	US 41 in Earlington	
KY 113	KY 805 at Kona	Millenium Road near Thornton Gap	
KY 114	US 460 southeast of Salyersville	KY 1428 in Prestonsburg	
KY 115	Pembroke Road at the Tennessee–Kentucky state line in Oak Grove	US 68 Alt. at Fairvew	
KY 116	KY 166 northeast of State Line	KY 307 in Fulton	
KY 117	US 41 Alt. north of Fort Campbell	KY 3186 at Gracey	
KY 118	US 421 / KY 80 in Hyden	Hal Rogers Parkway in Thousandsticks	
KY 120	US 60 / KY 91 in Marion	KY 138 in Slaughters	
KY 121	SR 119 at the Kentucky–Tennessee state line southeast of New Concord	US 51 / US 62 in Wickliffe	
KY 122	KY 114 east of Prestonsburg	US 460 west of Shelbiana	
KY 123	KY 307 / KY 3061 east of Clinton	US 51 in Bardwell	
KY 124	KY 139 in Cadiz	KY 91 at Bainbridge	
KY 125	SR 5 at the Kentucky–Tennessee state line north of Woodland Mills, TN	KY 94 in Hickman	
KY 126	KY 128 north of Buffalo	KY 139 north of Hopson	
KY 127			Renumbered KY 239 in 1958 because of US 127, which replaced the old KY 239
KY 128	US 68 / KY 80 south of Buffalo	KY 91 southeast of Princeton	
KY 129	KY 116 in Fulton	KY 339 at Stubblefield	
KY 130	KY 109 / KY 1257 northwest of Sturgis	Uniontown Ferry on the Ohio River in Uniontown	
KY 131	KY 58 northeast of Mayfield	US 62 in Reidland	
KY 132	KY 120 northeast of Marion	KY 56 in Sebree	
KY 133	Padon Road south of Salem	KY 137 east of the Ohio River	
KY 134	KY 191 at Adele	US 460 / KY 7 west of Elsie	
KY 135	US 60 at Burna	KY 91 south of the ferry to Cave-in-Rock, Illinois	
KY 136	Ohio River in northwestern Henderson County	Green River in southern Henderson County	
KY 136	KY 56 in Beech Grove	US 231 near Hartford	
KY 137	KY 135 in Carrsville	KY 133 west of Lola	
KY 137	US 60 north of Smithland	Stallion Road near Carrsville	
KY 138	KY 132 near Dixon	US 431 near Livermore	
KY 139	SR 120 at the Kentucky–Tennessee state line	KY 120 in rural Crittenden County	
KY 140	KY 256 at Poverty	US 231 near Red Hill	
KY 141	US 60 / KY 109 at Sullivan	KY 130 south of Uniontown	
KY 142	US 231 south of Masonville	KY 144 at Ensor	
KY 143	KY 109 south of Clay	KY 109 west of West Wheatcroft	
KY 144	KY 603 in Owensboro	US 31W in Radcliff	
KY 145	US 41 Alt. / KY 56 in Poole	US 60 in Corydon	
KY 146	US 60 / I-264 in St. Matthews	US 421 / KY 55 / KY 573 in New Castle	
KY 147	US 41 east of Elmwood	KY 370 at Onton	
KY 148	KY 155 in Fisherville	KY 44 west of Southville	
KY 149	US 421 / KY 80 southeast of Garrard	KY 66 northwest of Eriline	
KY 151	US 127 / US 127 Bypass northwest of Lawrenceburg	US 60 west of Frankfort	
KY 152	KY 49 near Loretto	US 27 / Galilee Road near Bryantsville	
KY 153	KY 1861 near Smithfield	US 42 near Pendleton	
KY 154	US 27 south of Claryville	KY 8 northwest of Foster	
KY 155	KY 55 / KY 1663 at Elk Creek	US 31E / US 150 in Louisville	
KY 156	KY 11 north of Tilton	KY 32 north of Goddard	
KY 157	US 42 at the Henry–Trimble county line north of Sligo	KY 146 west of New Castle	
KY 158	East Sorrell Lane and Harmon Lane south of Sunset	KY 32 in Hilda	
KY 159	KY 22 near Falmouth	AA Hwy (KY 9) near Foster	
KY 160	SR 160 near Appalachia, VA	KY 1087 in Vest	
KY 161	KY 170 at Flemingsburg Junction	KY 324 east of Mays Lick	
KY 162	US 62 in East Bardstown	KY 48 in Bloomfield	
KY 163	SR 51 at the Tennessee State Line south of Hestand	US 68 / KY 80 / East Stockton Street in Edmonton	
KY 164	US 68 / KY 80 / Old Canton Road Connector in Canton	KY 272 near Hopkinsville	
KY 165	KY 32 / Pike Bluff Road near Ewing	KY 19 near Brooksville	
KY 166	KY 125 near Hickman	US 45 / KY 1648 in Fulton	
KY 167	SR 154 at the Tennessee state line	KY 90 Bus. in Monticello	
KY 168	US 23 / US 60 in Catlettsburg	US 23 in Westwood	
KY 169	KY 33 near Versailles	US 25 Bus. in Richmond	
KY 170	KY 1325 east of Hill Top	KY 324 west of Helena	
KY 171	KY 106 southwest of Claymour	US 62 in Greenville	
KY 172	US 460 / KY 7 in West Liberty	KY 40 near Paintsville	
KY 173	KY 7 southwest of Sandy Hook	KY 32 east of Morehead	
KY 174	US 60 at Hays Crossing	US 60 at Clark Hill	
KY 175	KY 189 at Bancroft	US 431 south of Stroud	
KY 176	US 62 / KY 181 at Greenville	Rockport–Paradise Road at Paradise	
KY 177	KY 159 near Butler	KY 16 in Latonia	
KY 178	KY 106 / KY 507 near Elkton	US 68 Bus. in Russellville	
KY 179	KY 38 at Louellen	US 119 in Cumberland	
KY 180	US 60 / KY 3294 near Cannonsburg	KY 3 near Cannonsburg	
KY 181	KY 81 at Bremen	US 79 / KY 294 / KY 2128 at Tiny Town	
KY 182	KY 986 in rural Carter County	US 60 east of Olive Hill	
KY 183	KY 70 / KY 259 in Brownsville	Green River Lock and Dam No. 6	
KY 184	KY 47 north of Carson	US 42 west of Ethridge	
KY 185	US 68 / KY 80 in Bowling Green	US 62 / KY 79 in Caneyville	
KY 186	Fork Ridge Road (former SR 132) at the Tennessee state line north of Motch, TN	KY 74 / KY 1599 in Middlesboro	
KY 187	KY 70 in Huff	US 62 at Leitchfield	
KY 188	US 25E at Meldrum	Cranes Creek at Colmar	
KY 189	KY 507 / Flat Rock Road near Allegre	US 62 near Powderly	
KY 190	Tracey Branch Road at the Tennessee state line south of Frakes	US 25E south of Pineville	
KY 191	KY 15 in Campton	US 460 / KY 2498 in West Liberty	
KY 192	KY 80 Bus. east of Somerset	Hal Rogers Parkway in London	
KY 193	US 421 north of New Castle	KY 393 next to the Kentucky River	
KY 194	KY 1428 near Emma	SR 697 near Argo	
KY 195	KY 197 in Ashcamp	US 460 / KY 80 in Marrowbone	
KY 196	4-H Camp Road on the Union Ridge peninsula near Lake Cumberland	KY 80 at Nancy	
KY 197	KY 805 northeast of Jenkins	KY 80 in Elkhorn City	
KY 198	KY 70 at Yosemite	KY 80 in Elkhorn City	
KY 199	KY 632 south of McVeigh	US 119 in Huddy	

== 200–299 ==
Number	Southern or western terminus	Northern or eastern terminus	Notes
KY 200	Tennessee state line as a continuation of Caney Creek Road in Pickett County, TN	KY 167 at Number One	
KY 201	US 23 north of Paintsville	KY 1 in Webbville	
KY 202	US 421 north of New Castle	KY 389 at the confluence of Drennon Creek at the Kentucky River	
KY 203	KY 191 in Hazel Green	US 460 in Mize	
KY 204	KY 296 in Williamsburg	Melton Harmon Road in Clio	
KY 205	KY 30 in Jackson	US 460 near Greear	
KY 206	KY 55 Bus. in Columbia	KY 70 southwest of Liberty	
KY 207	KY 1654 near Rush	US 23 in Flatwoods	
KY 208	US 68 / KY 55 / KY 744 west of Spurlington	KY 2154 southwest of Lebanon	
KY 209	US 60 north of Counts Crossroads	KY 182 in Counts Crossroads	
KY 210	US 31W / KY 61 in Elizabethtown	KY 55 south of Campbellsville	
KY 211	KY 36 southwest of Upper Salt Lick	Sparrow Road near Salt Lick	
KY 211	Aurora Road near Grange City	KY 1722 in rural Rowan	
KY 212	CVG Airport in Hebron	KY 20 in Hebron	
KY 213	KY 52 near Ravenna	KY 713 near Jeffersonville	
KY 214	KY 100 west of Otia	KY 61 north of Peytonsburg	
KY 215	KY 38 in Evarts	KY 3458 in Dizney	
KY 216	KY 163 at Hestand	Tennessee state line	
KY 217	KY 988 west of Hutch	KY 987 northwest of Cubage	
KY 218	Flint Ridge Road / Mammoth Cave Park Road at Davis Williams Road in Northtown	US 68 / KY 70 near Exie	
KY 219	Twila	US 119 in Wallins Creek	
KY 220	KY 333 in Big Spring	US 31W in Radcliff	
KY 221	KY 66 east of Dorton Branch	KY 699 southwest of Leatherwood	
KY 222	US 62 east of Hansbrough	KY 84 west of Hodgenville	
KY 223	US 25E south of Baughman	KY 718 in Scalf	
KY 224	US 62 in Clarkson	KY 357 near Magnolia	
KY 225	KY 92 southwest of Ingram	US 25E / KY 3439 in Barbourville	
KY 226	KY 259 in Meredith	KY 88 near Peonia	
KY 227	US 460 near Georgetown	US 42 / KY 36 in Carrollton	
KY 228	KY 144 northwest of Andyville	KY 448 in Brandenburg	
KY 229	US 25E in Bailey Switch	US 25 in London	
KY 230	KY 144 southwest of Concordia	KY 144 near Concordia	
KY 231			Renumbered KY 71 in 1952 because of US 231, which replaced the old KY 71; the new KY 71 was renumbered again to KY 1803 in 1957 because of I-71
KY 232	KY 79 / KY 259 near Kingswood	Kingswood Orchard Road	
KY 233	KY 6 west of Dishman Springs	KY 830 southeast of McHargue	
KY 234	US 68 / KY 80 in Bowling Green	KY 101 north of Scottsville	
KY 235	Clark Road on the Mill Springs peninsula near Lake Cumberland	KY 80 at Nancy	
KY 236	KY 1303 in Edgewood	KY 212 near Hebron	
KY 237	KY 536 in Florence	KY 8 near Hebron	
KY 238	KY 185 at Big Reedy	KY 259 at Bee Spring	
KY 239	KY 116 / SR Route 21 at the Tennessee state line east of Jordan	KY 123 southwest of Clinton	Former route became part of US 127 (along with the portion of KY 16 south of there) in 1958
KY 240	US 68 / KY 80 near Petros	US 231 at Allen Springs	
KY 241	KY 43 in Cropper	US 421 in Pleasureville	
KY 242	US 68 / KY 80 near Rockfield	KY 622	
KY 243	KY 78 at Rolling Fork	US 68 north of Gravel Switch	
KY 244	US 23 in Russell	KY 3105 / KY 750 in Raceland	
KY 245	US 150 in Bardstown	KY 61 near Shepherdsville	
KY 246	KY 176 at Ebenezer	US 431 at Beechmont	
KY 247	KY 84 in Howardstown	US 31E in Culvertown	
KY 248	KY 44 near Litte Mount	US 62 near Johnsonville	
KY 249	KY 100 at Flippin	US 31E Bus. in Glasgow	
KY 250	KY 136 east of Calhoun	US 431 at Tichenor	
KY 251	US 31W in Elizabethtown	KY 313 in Fort Knox	
KY 252	US 31E / KY 1855 northeast of Scottsville	US 31E at Haywood	
KY 253	KY 86 west of Cecilia	KY 1357 west of Saint John	
KY 254	KY 70 / I-69 in Madisonville	KY 81 in Sacramento	
KY 255	KY 252 near Rocky Hill	KY 70 in Mammoth Cave National Park	
KY 256	KY 56 / KY 136 at Beech Grove	KY 81 in Calhoun	
KY 257	US 421 / KY 80 in Hyden	Wilder Branch in Confluence	
KY 258	KY 56 north of Beech Grove	KY 56 west of Saint Joseph	
KY 259	KY 144 near Rhodelia	US 68 / KY 80 at Hays	
KY 260	KY 1069 at West Hanson	KY 254 in Hanson	
KY 261	KY 54 near Fordsville	KY 79 in rural Meade County	
KY 262	KY 630 west of Madisonville	US 41	
KY 263	KY 185 southeast of Richardsville	Richardsville Road near the confluence of the Green River and the Barren River	
KY 264			Part became portions of KY 120, KY 283 (this portion now decommissioned), and the rest was renumbered KY 1835 in 1962 to avoid conflict with the then-new I-264
KY 265			Renumbered KY 585 in 1988 to avoid conflict with the then-new I-265
KY 266	KY 136 at Smith Mills	US 41 Alt. at Rock Springs	
KY 267	Typo Road / Typo Tunnel Lane in Typo	KY 476 near Dice	
KY 268	KY 136 at Geneva	KY 136	
KY 269	KY 403 south of Logansport	US 231 in Prentiss	
KY 270	KY 130 east of Henshaw	US 41 Alt. south of Jolly	
KY 271	KY 1389 at Utility	US 60 northwest of Hawesville	
KY 272	US 68 / KY 80 southwest of Cadiz	KY 107 in Hopkinsville	
KY 273	KY 69 west of Beaver Dam	US 62 / US 231	
KY 274	US 68 Bus. southwest of Cadiz	KY 93 at Confederate	
KY 275			Became a portion of KY 317 in 1964 to avoid conflict with the then-new I-275
KY 276	KY 274 north of Rockcastle	US 68 and KY 80 in Cadiz	
KY 277	Everly Brothers Boulevard in Central City	River Road in Central City	
KY 278	Highland Avenue / Lakeshore Drive in Princeton	KY 672 north of Friendship	
KY 279	KY 815 south of West Louisville	Wimsatt Road / French Island Road	
KY 280	KY 94 in Murray	KY 121 west of New Concord	
KY 281	US 41 / US 41 Alt. in Madisonville	KY 138 in Jewell City	
KY 282	KY 95 in Calvert City	US 62 and US 641 near Gilbertsville	
KY 283	KY 132 west of Ortiz	US 41 north of Robards	
KY 284	US 60 / US 62 in Paducah	US 68 southeast of Reidland	
KY 285	US 41 Alt. south of Henderson	KY 136 in Henderson	
KY 286	KY 121 in Wickliffe	US 62 near Paducah	
KY 287	KY 107 at Bennettstown	KY 164 at Peedee	
KY 288	US 51 west of Spring Hill	KY 703 near New Cypress	
KY 289	US 68 / KY 55 in Campbellsville	US 68 / KY 55 near Lebanon	Established 1983
KY 289	Lake Barkley (Eddyville prior to the lake's formation)	US 68 near Golden Pond	Removed 1965; now Forest Road 134
KY 290	KY 3630 in Annville	US 421 in McKee	
KY 291	KY 70 south of Dalton	KY 109 in Dalton	
KY 292	Upper Stringtown Road / Stringtown Court southeast of Burnwell	KY 3 near Job	
KY 293	KY 93 / KY 1055 near Eddyville	KY 270 near Lisman	
KY 294	Tennessee state in Montgomery County	KY 181 at Guthrie	
KY 295	US 62 / US 641 / KY 93 northwest of Kuttawa	KY 70 in Dycusburg	
KY 296	KY 92 near Williamsburg	US 25W in Williamsburg	
KY 297	US 60 west of Marion	KY 135 west of Tolu	
KY 298	US 431 near Owensboro	KY 2155 in Owensboro	
KY 299	KY 94 northwest of Wiswell	KY 402 near Brewers	

== 300–399 ==
Number	Southern or western terminus	Northern or eastern terminus	Notes
KY 300	KY 34 / KY 1822 in Parksville	US 150 in Stanford	
KY 301	KY 58 southwest of Hicksville	KY 131 south of Dogwood	
KY 302	US 23 / US 460 / KY 80 in Watergap	KY 1428 in Hager Hill	
KY 303	Foyshack Road at the Tennessee state line southeast of Pilot Oak	KY 121 Bus. in Mayfield	
KY 304	US 431 / KY 70 in Central City	KY 1031 in Central City	Established 2009
KY 304	US 23 (now KY 321)	KY 3 in Auxier	Removed 1988; became part of rerouted KY 3 (now KY 3051)
KY 305	US 62 in Camelia	US 60 Bus. in Paducah	
KY 306	Branham Hollow Road / Stoker Branch Road in Wheelwright	KY 122 in Wheelwright Junction	
KY 307	SR 43 / KY 129 in Fulton	US 62 east of Cunningham	
KY 308	Forest Hills Road / Kate Camp Branch Road south of Forest Hills	US 119 near the confluence of the Road Fork with Pond Creek	
KY 309	Mt. Olive Road in rural Obion County, TN	KY 94 and Broadway Street in Hickman	
KY 310	US 60 east of LaCenter	KY 1105 at Oscar	
KY 311	SR 157 at the Tennessee state line	KY 94 west of Anna Lynne	
KY 312	KY 192 near Corbin	US 25E and World Drive in Corbin	
KY 313	I-65 in Fort Knox	SR 135 at Ohio River near Brandenburg	Established 1989
KY 313	Mississippi River	Tennessee state line	Removed by 1981; now Kentucky Bend Road
KY 314	KY 70 at Halfway	KY 218 at Shady Grove	
KY 315	KY 28 south of Crockettsville	KY 30 south of Shoulderblade	
KY 316	US 421 southwest of Carmon	KY 55 in Providence	
KY 317	KY 805 in Neon Junction	KY 7 in Deane	
KY 318	US 31E / KY 90	US 31E Bus. in Glasgow	Removed 1992; now Happy Valley Road
KY 319	KY 1056 near Ransom	US 119 northwest of Toler	
KY 320	Kentucky River Lock & Dam No. 1 on the Kentucky River	US 42 in Carrollton	
KY 321	KY 1428 at Prestonsburg	US 23 near Paintsville	Established 1993
KY 321	US 31W in Bowling Green	US 31W/US 68 in Bowling Green	Removed 1983; now Avenue of Champions, College Heights Boulevard, State Street, and College Street
KY 322	KY 53 north of Chestnut Grove	KY 1861 in Smithfield	
KY 323	KY 566 at Eve	US 68 in Campbellsville	
KY 324	US 62 south of Shannon	KY 11 at Weedonia	
KY 325	KY 355 at Moxley	KY 227 west of New Liberty	
KY 326	US 127 in Lawrenceburg	Lanes Mill Road / Clifton Road at Ninevah	
KY 327	KY 84 at Saint Mary	KY 49 in Saint Charles	
KY 328	KY 70 near Eubank	KY 618 at Quail	
KY 329	US 42 in Prospect	KY 146 in Crestwood	
KY 330	KY 227 in Hallam	US 27 / KY 22 northwest of Falmouth	
KY 331	US 60 in Owensboro	Griffith Station Road / Lower River Road in Owensboro	
KY 332	KY 245 at Bardstown	US 31E / US 150 in Bardstown	
KY 333	KY 2780 in Webster	KY 313 south of Hog Wallow	
KY 334	US 60 north of Maceo	KY 3101 at Hawesville	
KY 335	US 31W in Cave City	US 31W in Rowletts	
KY 336	US 41 in Earlington	US 41 in Madisonville	
KY 337	KY 70 in Mannsville	KY 243 at Gravel Switch	
KY 338	US 25 in Richwood	KY 20 in Idlewild	
KY 339	KY 564 north or Cooksville	US 45 on the Massac–Hendron	
KY 340	KY 70 at Huldeville	Neafus Road at Neafus	
KY 341	US 62 / US 421 in Midway	KY 1973	
KY 342	KY 33 in Burgin	KY 33 south of Shakertown	
KY 343	KY 317 in Fleming-Neon	McRoberts Road in McRoberts	
KY 344	KY 57 northeast of Mount Carmel	KY 59 in Kinniconick	
KY 345	Fort Campbell south of Garrettsburg	KY 695 at Church Hill	
KY 346	Ewing Street / Park Street in Guthrie	US 79	
KY 347	KY 920 at Limp	Dry Ridge Road	
KY 348	KY 1241 south of Saint Johns	US 641 / KY 58 in Benton	
KY 349	US 62 in White Plains	KY 813 in White Plains	Removed 1995; now Franklin Street
KY 350	Albany	KY 90 at Cartwright	
KY 351	US 41 Alt. / US 60 in Henderson	KY 416 in Hebbardsville	
KY 352	Panina Pike south of Oakland	KY 875 at Stonewall	
KY 353	KY 4 in Lexington	US 62 in Broadwell	
KY 354	KY 80 in London	Hal Rogers Parkway / KY 30 in London	
KY 355	US 127 near Monterey	KY 227 near Worthville	
KY 356	US 25 at Stonewall	KY 3016 / KY 36 at Cynthiana	
KY 357	US 31W / KY 88 at Munfordville	KY 84 west of Hodgenville	
KY 358	KY 286 near New York	KY 305 near Paducah	
KY 359	US 60 in Morganfield	KY 136 in Smith Mills	
KY 360	KY 56 near Spring Grove	KY 359 near Hitesville	
KY 361	US 31W in Elizabethtown	Entrance to Fort Knox at Bullion Boulevard	Established 2014
KY 361	US 79 in Russellville	US 431 (now KY 2146) in Russellville	Removed 1982; now Armstrong Street
KY 362	KY 22 at Pewee Valley	KY 53 at Raymond Hill	
KY 363	KY 312 in Keavy	US 25 in London	
KY 364	KY 1081 near Maggard	US 460 / KY 7 at Cottle	
KY 365	US 60 north of Mattoon	US 60 / KY 109	
KY 366	KY 1499 at Fedscreek	Jones Fork Road / Dicks Fork Road	
KY 367	KY 170 north of Elizaville	Fleming–Mason county line	
KY 368	KY 227 north of Stamping Ground	US 127 south of Monterey	
KY 369	KY 70 in Rochester	US 231 in Beaver Dam	
KY 370	KY 138 in Jewell City	College Street in Sebree	
KY 371	KY 17 in Fort Wright	KY 8 in Villa Hills	
KY 372	U.S. Army Corps of Engineers boundary on Smith Ridge Road south of Atchison	KY 70 in Campbellsville	
KY 373	US 62 / US 641 / KY 93 in Kuttawa	KY 1943	
KY 374	KY 499 at Speedwell	KY 1986 at Union City	
KY 375	KY 163 southeast of Tompkinsville	KY 163 in Tompkinsville	Formed 2021
KY 375	KY 159 northeast of Falmouth	KY 22	Removed by 1977; now KY 3173
KY 376	KY 144 in Frymire	KY 144 in Payneville	
KY 377	KY 32 in Webster	KY 344 near Stricklett	
KY 378	KY 1812 south of Sewell	KY 30 south of Hendricks	
KY 379	KY 1880 near Claywell	Irish Bottom Road at the Cumberland River	
KY 379	KY 771 near Ribbon	US 127 in Russell Springs	
KY 380	KY 272 in Hopkinsville	US 41 / KY 109 in Hopkinsville	
KY 381	Tennessee state line south of Fairbanks	KY 97 / KY 339 in Sedalia	
KY 382	SR 261 near Gamaliel	KY 63 / KY 100 in Gamaliel	Renumbered from a portion of KY 87 in 2022
KY 382	Pine Mountain State Resort Park	US 25E south of Pineville	Removed by 1977; now State Park Road
KY 383	SR 49 at the Tennessee state line southwest of Providence	US 31W in Franklin	
KY 384	KY 339 / KY 1748 near Dublin	KY 80 west of Mayfield	
KY 385	KY 303 north of the Tennessee state line	KY 2422 near Cuba	
KY 386	KY 13 south of Carlisle	US 68 west of Carlisle	
KY 387	KY 91 between Marion and the Ohio River	Boat ramp at the river at the former site of Dam 50	
KY 388	US 25 Bus. / KY 52 / South Second Street in Richmond	KY 627 at Boonesborough	
KY 389	KY 561 southwest of Orville	KY 55 south of Carrollton	
KY 390	KY 53 near Seaville	US 127 / US 127 Byp. north of Harrodsburg	
KY 391	KY 1600 south of Vine Grove	KY 144	
KY 392	US 62 in Cynthiana	KY 1244 near Barefoot	
KY 393	KY 1818 near Centerfield	US 42 near Buckner	
KY 394	KY 378 in the valley of Frozen Creek	Davis Creek near the Breathitt–Wolfe county line	
KY 395	KY 44 near Anderson City	KY 43 in Elmburg	
KY 396	KY 2 west of Carter	KY 474 at the Carter–Lewis county line north of Eby	
KY 397	KY 1110 west of Haddix	KY 30 south of Jackson	
KY 398	KY 91 at Bainbridge	KY 109 near Pennyrile Forest State Resort Park	
KY 399	KY 30 in Vincent	KY 52 in Daniel Boone National Forest	

== 400–499 ==
Number	Southern or western terminus	Northern or eastern terminus	Notes
KY 400	US 41 Alt. at Fort Campbell	KY 115	
KY 401	KY 259 in Madrid	KY 86 in Dyer	
KY 402	KY 58 northwest of Brewers	US 68 west of Aurora	Established 2002
KY 402	I-24 in Winchester	US 460 near Salyersville	Renumbered from part of KY 114 in 1985 and removed 1990; renummbered KY 9000 and KY 9009
KY 402	KY 58 northeast of Flemingsburg	Beechburg	Removed 1982; now part of KY 3301
KY 403	US 231 near Woodbury	Green River near Logansport	
KY 404	KY 7 southeast of Arthurmabel	KY 114 in Prestonsburg	
KY 405	KY 144 at Thruston	KY 2830 near Maceo	
KY 406	KY 66 at the Clay County line	US 421 at Stinnett	
KY 407	US 41 at Empire	US 41 south of the Hopkins County line	
KY 408	US 62 near Magee Springs	US 68 near Fairdealing	
KY 409	KY 486 at Stephens	KY 7 south of Bruin	
KY 410	US 23 in Greenup	KY 2541 in Greenup	
KY 411	KY 70 at Whittinghill	KY 187 at Shrewsbury	
KY 412	KY 84 south of Saint Mary	KY 208 south of Calvary	
KY 413	KY 840 in Loyall	KY 522 east of Rosspoint	
KY 414	Sunset Lane	US 41 north of Henderson	Removed 2014; now Stratman Road
KY 415	Koger Mountain Road / Koger Lane east of Rolan	KY 350	
KY 416	US 41 Alt. at Tunnel Hill	Green River east of Hebbardsville	
KY 417	Main Street (US 68 / KY 61 / KY 70) at Greensburg	Grissom Road	
KY 418	US 25 / US 421 in Lexington	KY 627 southeast of Boonesborough	
KY 419	KY 324 east of Mays Lick	KY 11 near Lewisburg	
KY 420	US 127 south of Frankfort	US 127 in Frankfort	
KY 422	US 31W	KY 259 at Pig	
KY 423	KY 175	Stringtown Road at Millport	
KY 424	KY 61 west of Allendale	KY 569 at Mac	
KY 425	US 60 / KY 136 in Henderson	US 41 / KY 136 / KY 2084 in Henderson	Established 1986
KY 425	US 127 in Lawrenceburg	US 127 in Lawrenceburg	Removed by 1973; became part of rerouted US 127
KY 426	KY 84 near St. Mary	US 68 / KY 55 southwest of Lebanon	
KY 427	KY 1374	KY 483 east of Westplains	
KY 428	US 60 south of Guston	KY 261 in Haysville	
KY 429	KY 55 in Lebanon	KY 152 at Cisselville	
KY 430	US 127 in Russell Springs	KY 80 in Russell Springs	
KY 431			Renumbered KY 458 in 1954 because of US 431
KY 432	US 68 / KY 80 in Bowling Green	White Stone Quarry Road in Blue Level	
KY 433	KY 152 in Mackville	KY 458 at Polin	
KY 434	US 31W in Radcliff	KY 61 in Lebanon Junction	
KY 435	KY 10 at Fernleaf	KY 8	
KY 436	KY 218 / KY 570 near Uno	KY 88 near Monroe	
KY 437	KY 172 northwest of Elamton	KY 172 west of Relief	
KY 438	KY 55 east of Valley Hill	KY 152 at Mackville	
KY 439	Columbia Bypass (KY 55 north/ KY 55 / KY 61 south) in Columbia	Columbia	
KY 440	KY 121 northwest of Mayfield	KY 339	
KY 441	KY 74 in Middlesboro	US 25E in Middlesboro	
KY 442	US 150 between Pottsville and the Boyle County line	KY 152 at Jenkinsville	
KY 443	Cairo–Hickory Grove Road	US 41 Alt. north of Rock Springs	
KY 444	KY 121 at New Concord	Tearose Drive / Primrose Drive	
KY 445	KY 8 in Cold Spring	US 27 in Fort Thomas	
KY 446	US 31W / US 68 / KY 80 in Bowling Green	I-65 in Bowling Green	
KY 447	US 31W at Elizabethtown	KY 220	
KY 448	KY 313 in Brandenburg	KY 79 / KY 313 in Brandenburg	
KY 449	KY 61 north of Kettle	KY 90 east of Bow	
KY 450	KY 348 northwest of Symsonia	KY 284	
KY 451	KY 15 southeast of Glomawr	KY 28 in Chavies	
KY 452	KY 1247 at Pulaski	KY 39 at Bobtown	
KY 453	Land Between the Lakes National Recreation Area north entrance / The Trace near Grand Rivers	US 60 / North Court Street in Smithland	
KY 454	US 62 in St. Charles	KY 112 at Carbondale	
KY 455	KY 16 in Glencoe	KY 35 in Warsaw	
KY 456	KY 500 south of Curdsville	KY 56 west of Sorgho	
KY 457	KY 84 at the Nelson–Marion county line near Gleanings	Holy Cross	
KY 458	KY 55 at Mooresville	KY 55 at Wakefield	Established 1954; former KY 431; old route was in Christian County
KY 459	KY 6 near Dishman Springs	KY 6 / KY 11 at Barbourville	
KY 461	KY 80 in Mark	US 25 in Mount Vernon	
KY 462	KY 210 at Badger	KY 84	
KY 463	KY 160 in Gordon	KY 699 near Slemp	
KY 464	KY 121 Bus. in Mayfield	KY 94 near Shiloh	
KY 465	KY 47 west of Sparta	KY 455 north of Sparta	
KY 466	Abe Fork Road / Skull Fork Road southeast of Wheelwright	KY 122 at Melvin	
KY 467	KY 227 near Worthville	KY 177 near DeMossville	
KY 468	KY 3220 at Sidney	KY 292 near Nolan WV	
KY 469	KY 172 at Redbush	KY 32 at Martha	
KY 470	US 31E at Magnolia	KY 1832 near Hodgenville	
KY 471			Extension of I-471
KY 471	US 25W in Jellico	US 25W in Saxton	Renumbered KY 1804 in 1962 to avoid conflict with I-471
KY 472	KY 80 in London	US 421 near Burning Springs	
KY 473	KY 286 at Gage	KY 1105 near Oscar	
KY 474	KY 59 southeast of Camp Dix	KY 2 at Carter	
KY 475	US 41 west of Trenton	US 68 / KY 80 at Tress Shop	
KY 476	KY 15 Bus. in Hazard	KY 15 at Lost Creek	
KY 477	KY 79 north of Irvington	KY 376 between Frymire and Payneville	
KY 478	KY 1651 in Whitley City	KY 204 at Redbird	
KY 479	KY 88 at Wax	KY 224 west of the Nolin River	
KY 480	KY 61 in Shepherdsville	KY 523 in rural Nelson County	
KY 481	KY 336 / KY 2171 in Earlington	US 41 / KY 70 in Madisonville	
KY 482	KY 100 west of Alonzo	US 31E / US 231	
KY 483	KY 131 at Westplains	KY 301 at Clear Springs	
KY 484	KY 1482 at Panco	Buckhorn Lake	
KY 485	Dale Hollow Lake	KY 3104 at the Cumberland River	
KY 486	KY 32 near Isonville	KY 1 near Willard	
KY 487	US 68 at Exie	KY 61 at Gresham	
KY 488	KY 80 near Lida	KY 1305	
KY 489	KY 22 in Williamstown	Williamstown Lake	
KY 489	Williamstown Lake	KY 467	
KY 490	US 25 near East Bernstadt	US 25 in Livingston	
KY 491	KY 14 / KY 16 at Verona	KY 17 near DeMossville	
KY 492	KY 667 at Dekoven	US 60 at Hamner	
KY 493	KY 132 at Fairmont	KY 109 east of Wheatcroft	
KY 494	KY 132 southwest of Sebree	US 41 south of Sebree	
KY 495	KY 20 near Francisville	KY 237 near Bullittsville	Established 2022
KY 495	US 41 south of Sebree	KY 138	Removed 1993, with part transferred to KY 1835; rest now Breton Road
KY 496	KY 90 near Marrowbone	KY 163 in Edmonton	
KY 497	KY 94 east of Hico	Kentucky Lake	
KY 498	KY 52 near Beattyville	KY 11 near Beattyville	
KY 499	US 25 near Richmond	KY 89 near Irvine	

== 500–599 ==
Number	Southern or western terminus	Northern or eastern terminus	Notes
KY 500	KY 56 at St. Joseph	KY 456 south of Curdsville	
KY 501	KY 910 at Phil	US 27 northeast of Kings Mountain	
KY 502	KY 109 / Bone Road at Rabbit Ridge	Old Morganfield Road / Balls Hill Road north of Nebo	
KY 503	KY 5 north of Princess	KY 3105 / Industrial Road in Wurtland	
KY 504	KY 32 east of Elliottville	KY 7 at Green	
KY 505	US 231 southeast of Cromwell	KY 878 at Olaton	
KY 506	KY 902 northeast of Enon	US 60 / KY 91 / West Depot Street in Marion	
KY 507	KY 107 in Hopkinsville	KY 106 / KY 178 at Claymour	
KY 508	KY 507 east of Hopkinsville	Liberty	
KY 509	KY 245 south of Samuels	KY 48 west of Fairfield	
KY 510	KY 221 at Pine Mountain	KY 463 north of Gordon	
KY 511	US 25W east of Youngs Creek	KY 26 / Youngs Lane at Rockholds	
KY 512	KY 395 at Birdie	US 127 east of Alton	
KY 513	US 62 at Fox Creek	Harry Wise Road / Gilberts Creek Road east of McBrayer	
KY 514	Ferguson Road at the Caldwell-Lyon County line west of Hopson	KY 126 / KY 128 northwest of Cobb	
KY 515	KY 903	KY 139 south-southeast of Princeton	
KY 516	Meldrum	Ferndale	
KY 517	KY 252	Bailey Point Road / Hix Road northeast of Cedar Springs	
KY 518	KY 78 in Hustonville	KY 198 in Mt. Salem	Removed 2001; now Mt. Salem Road
KY 519	KY 7 near Pomp	US 60 / Clearfield Road in Morehead	
KY 520	KY 136 southeast of Anthoston	KY 416 / Upper Delaware Road at Coraville	
KY 521	KY 1189 southwest of Lesbas	KY 80 southwest of Brock	
KY 522	US 119 / Ross Drive in Rosspoint	KY 160 at Sand Hill	
KY 523	KY 245 / Marr Lane southeast of Deatsville	Louisville Road at Highgrove	
KY 524	US 42 near Russell Corner	US 42 near Oldham	
KY 525	KY 164 west of Roaring Spring	KY 139 south of Cadiz	
KY 526	KY 185 in Warren County	US 31W / US 68 / KY 80 near Bristow	
KY 527	US 68 / KY 55 / KY 70 in Campbellsville	KY 49 at Holy Cross	
KY 528	KY 55 / KY 3164 near Springfield	KY 438 at Lincoln Homestead State Park	
KY 529	Valley Hill Road / Croakes Station Road at Booker	KY 55 west of Mooresville	
KY 530	KY 55 / Keltner Road near Columbia	KY 2971 north of Columbia	
KY 531	KY 80 east of Ozark	KY 206 at Christine	
KY 532	New Cedar Grove Road at the Green County line	KY 61 southwest of Hatcher	
KY 533	KY 496 southeast of Edmonton	Independence Ridge Road / Pelston Cemetery Road east of Breeding	
KY 534	KY 408 / Wayne Freeman Road northeast of Clear Springs	KY 348 in Symsonia	
KY 535	Kentucky Route 74 near Fonde	Fonde	
KY 536	KY 338 near Rabbit Hash	US 27 in Alexandria	
KY 537	US 460 east of Paris	US 60 east of Stoops	
KY 538	US 60 / Meade Springer Road near Rockdale	US 23 near Catlettsburg	
KY 539	US 62 west of Mount Olivet	KY 22 east of Neave	
KY 540	KY 1812 northwest of Keck	Steel Fork Road / Strong Fork Road southeast of Taulbee	
KY 541	KY 52 northwest of Chenowee	KY 205 northwest of Fivemile	
KY 542	KY 30 southeast of Gage	KY 7 southeast of Fredville	
KY 543	KY 1243 / Smith Cemetery Road at Clarks Corner	US 68 southeast of Beechville	
KY 544	US 68 west of Cork	Bridgeport Road east of the East Fork of the Little Barren River	
KY 545	KY 408 / Blinco Road northeast of Kirbyton	KY 849 southeast of Cunningham	Established by 1981
KY 545	KY 79	KY 70 in Monford	Removed by 1977; now McKendree Chapel Road
KY 546	Covington	Ohio State Line east of Lloyd	Established 1988 and removed 1994; replaced by KY 9 and KY 10
KY 546	KY 106 in Mass Crossroads	KY 626 in Davis Crossroads	Removed by 1977; now KY 2377, Hamilton Lee Road, and Caney Fork Road
KY 547	KY 10 in Alexandria	KY 8 in Silver Grove	
KY 548	KY 307 north of Kirbyton	Blinco Road northeast of Kirbyton	
KY 549	KY 55 / Vories Road northwest of Mill Creek	KY 55 southwest of Prestonville	
KY 550	KY 15 / KY 80 at Hazard	KY 80 / Judge Road at Eastern	Established 1982
KY 550	US 42 in Ghent	KY 1112 in Easterday	Removed by 1977; now KY 2949
KY 551	KY 55 in Columbia	KY 1615 northeast of Clementsville	
KY 552	KY 192 northeast of Hightop	US 25 / Slate Ridge Road northeast of Lily	
KY 553	Dale Hollow Lake west of Shipley	US 127 Bus. in Albany	
KY 554	KY 815 north of Guffie	US 431 south of Pettit	
KY 555	US 150 Bus. / KY 55 / KY 152 in Springfield	US 62 in rural Anderson County	
KY 556	KY 173 at Lytten	KY 7 / Court Street in Sandy Hook	
KY 557	KY 556	KY 7 and KY 32 north of Sandy Hook	
KY 558	US 127 / Old Bypassed US 127 Segment 7 Connector south of Snow	Lake Cumberland southeast of Rowena	
KY 559	KY 170 northeast of Nepton	KY 344 at Petersville	
KY 560	KY 32 east of Cowan	US 68 / East Bolden Lane southwest of Mays Lick	
KY 561	US 421 northwest of Flag Fork	Kentucky River Lock and Dam No. 3 / Fallis-Gest Road at Gest	
KY 562	KY 16	US 42 / US 127 northeast of Napoleon	
KY 563	KY 1295 northeast of Hyattsville	KY 39 / Buckeye Road northeast of Stone	
KY 564	KY 94 east of Tri City	KY 58 southeast of Hicksville	
KY 565	KY 61 northwest of Gresham	KY 55 south of Romine	
KY 566	US 31E at Linwood	KY 61 northwest of Allendale	
KY 567	KY 210 in Elizabethtown	Larue County line northwest of Roanoke	
KY 568	US 421 at Cranks	Rhymer Hicks Cemetery Lane northeast of Cranks	
KY 569	KY 357 west of Hinesdale	KY 210 northeast of Mac	
KY 570	KY 218 / KY 436 at LeGrande	KY 88 southeast of Hardyville	
KY 571	KY 740 southeast of Park	US 31W in Woodsonville	
KY 572	KY 571 northwest of Seymour	KY 218 southwest of LeGrande	
KY 573	US 421 / KY 55 / KY 146 in New Castle	KY 561 north of Flag Fork	
KY 574	US 421 / KY 55 in Campbellsburg	KY 389 southeast of Port Royal	
KY 575	KY 58 west of Fulgham	KY 123 west of Nichols	
KY 576	KY 3056 west of Moranburg	KY 8 at South Ripley	
KY 577	KY 3630 southeast of Peoples	KY 11 east of Taft	
KY 578	KY 490 at Victory	KY 290 / Wiley Hillard Road in Annville	
KY 579	KY 30 (now KY 3630) in Annville	Annville	Removed 1985; now KY 3444
KY 580	US 460 southeast of Oil Springs	KY 40 at Barnetts Creek	
KY 581	KY 40 in Paintsville	US 23 near Georges Creek	
KY 582	KY 160 near Littcarr	KY 7 at Kite	
KY 583	KY 52 northwest of Lyons	US 62 / KY 61 at Younger Creek	
KY 584	KY 61 southwest of South Buffalo	KY 210 north of Jericho	
KY 585	KY 73 in Franklin	KY 100 west of Scottsville	Renumbered from KY 265 in 1988
KY 585	Coon Range Lake	KY 1153 northeast of Lewisburg	Removed 1982; now Coon Range Lake Road
KY 586	KY 472	KY 638 at Maplesville	
KY 587	US 421 / Jackson County High School Road near Smith	KY 11 near Congleton	
KY 588	KY 7 in Blackey	KY 931 near Ice	
KY 589	KY 172 southwest of Elkfork	KY 437 north of Mima	
KY 590	US 27 / Bass Avenue in Stanford	KY 52 at Hedgeville	
KY 591	KY 96 north of Schley	KY 383 west of Providence	
KY 592	KY 92 / Bob Musgrove Road near Pine Knot	KY 92 near Pine Knot	
KY 593	KY 56 south of Comer	KY 136 / Porter School Road east of Beech Grove	
KY 594	US 421 north of Bighill	KY 52 west of Irvine	
KY 595	KY 1617 near Berea	Poosey Ridge Road in rural Madison County	
KY 596	US 62 at Shannon	KY 10 in Germantown	
KY 597	KY 11 Bus. in Flemingsburg	KY 11 southeast of Marshall	
KY 598	KY 1915	US 127 south of Harrodsburg	
KY 599	KY 613 north of Bowen	US 460 in Jeffersonville	

== 600–699 ==
Number	Southern or western terminus	Northern or eastern terminus	Notes
KY 600	KY 831	KY 171 northwest of Clifty	
KY 601	KY 181 in Greenville	KY 175 north of Graham	
KY 602	KY 277 in Central City	KY 1031 in Central City	
KY 603	Wendell Ford Expressway (US 60 / US 231) in Owensboro	KY 144 in Owensboro	Established 2011
KY 603	US 431 (now KY 1031) in Central City	KY 602 in Central City	Removed 1994; now Park Street
KY 604	US 431 (Western Kentucky Parkway) in Central City	US 62 in Central City	
KY 605	KY 1183 / Manton Road at Manton	US 62 in Bardstown	
KY 606	Bald Hill Road northeast of Barterville	US 68 southwest of Ellisville	
KY 607	US 127 south of Monterey	KY 330 at the Owen–Grant county line	
KY 608	Frogtown Road at the Owen-Scott county line southeast of Natlee	US 25 south of Stonewall	
KY 609	KY 159 at Concord	KY 177 east of Meridian	
KY 610	KY 805 at Dorton	KY 122 near Virgie	
KY 611	KY 195 at Lookout	US 23 / US 119 east of Jonancy	
KY 612	KY 468 south of Rural	KY 292 northeast of Turkey Creek	
KY 613	KY 11 and KY 15 at Bowen	Forestry Road No. 23 at the Menifee County line northeast of Old Lombard	
KY 614	KY 280 east of Pottertown	Wildcat Creek Campground	Removed 1985; now Poplar Springs Road
KY 615	KY 213 at Morris	KY 599 northwest of Bowen	
KY 616	KY 1029 and KY 2505 northwest of Fairview	KY 875 southwest of Germantown	
KY 617	US 62 east of Kentontown	KY 165 / Piqua Lane northwest of Piqua	
KY 618	KY 1781 at Broughtentown	KY 1250 south of Spiro	
KY 619	KY 92 southeast of Montpelier	KY 379 in downtown Russell Springs	
KY 620	US 62 in Georgetown	US 25 near Rogers Gap	
KY 621	KY 103 southeast of Auburn	US 31W north of Franklin	
KY 622	KY 73 near Hickory Flat	US 231 in Bowling Green	
KY 623	KY 48 north of the East Fork of Cox Creek	KY 44 east of Waterford	
KY 624	KY 124 and KY 126 in Cerulean	KY 91 / Old Princeton Road southeast of Bainbridge	
KY 625	US 421 in Bedford	US 421 in Milton	
KY 626	KY 1153	KY 1435 at Rockland	
KY 627	US 25 / US 421 at Richmond	US 68 Bus. Paris	
KY 628	Wolf Creek northeast of Ayres	US 25W / Stringtown Road in Pleasant View	
KY 629	KY 54 southeast of Fordsville	KY 992 southeast of Mattingly	
KY 630	KY 262 / John Hardy Road south of Manitou	KY 132 in Dixon	
KY 631	KY 54 near Short Creek	KY 54 near Short Creek	
KY 632	KY 194 at Kimper	KY 194 in Phelps	
KY 633	Cane Valley Road at the Taylor County line	KY 55 / Cane Valley Church Road south of Coburg	
KY 634	KY 744 northwest of Spurlington	KY 289 southwest of Jessietown	
KY 635	KY 70 near Bethelridge	KY 39 near Dabney	
KY 636	KY 248 east of Taylorsville Lake	KY 395 west of Harrisonville	
KY 637	KY 395 in Waddy	KY 1472	Removed 1979; now KY 2867
KY 638	KY 80 in London	US 421 and KY 11 in Manchester	
KY 639	KY 553 west of Shipley	KY 734 northwest of Snow	
KY 640	KY 90 at Summer Shade	KY 70 west of Knob Lick	
KY 641			Renumbered KY 489 in 1955 because of US 641, which replaced the old KY 489
KY 642	KY 39 southeast of Lancaster	US 150 in Stanford	Removed 1997; now Gilberts Creek Road and Goshen Road
KY 643	US 27 / KY 1247 south of Halls Gap	KY 39 in Crab Orchard	
KY 644	KY 2565 near Louisa	KY 3 near Louisa	
KY 645	US 23 near Ulysses	Inez	Established 1984
KY 645	Donaldson Road	US 460 near Sideview	Removed by 1980; now Chiles Highway
KY 646	KY 213 in Jeffersonville	KY 713 southeast of Mount Sterling	
KY 647	US 60 in Mt. Sterling	Mt. Sterling	Removed 1997; now Old Owingsville Road
KY 648	KY 1879	US 68 north of Millersburg	
KY 649	KY 504 east of Ault	Mobley Flats Road northeast of Ibex	
KY 650	KY 172 east of Lenox	KY 755 southeast of The Ridge	
KY 651	Sandy Ridge Road	KY 15 southwest of Campton	
KY 652	KY 48 in Fairfield	KY 55 south of Taylorsville	
KY 653	KY 94 / Cotton Gin Road	Ash Log Road / Davis Road near Sassafras Ridge	
KY 654	KY 120 at Tribune	Baker Hollow Road / Weston Road northwest of Mattoon	
KY 655	KY 70 northwest of Windyville	KY 70 at Windyville	
KY 656	KY 1238	KY 333 south of Garrett	
KY 657	KY 1389 east of Scythia	KY 334 / Pell Street in Lewisport	
KY 658	US 68 / Cherokee Drive in Campbellsville	KY 1799 near Arista	
KY 659	KY 70 east of Mannsville	KY 70 / KY 1752 southwest of Bass	
KY 660	US 31E	KY 1319 north of Mt. Washington	
KY 661	KY 662	KY 657 northeast of Yelvington	
KY 662	KY 1319 north of Mt. Washington	KY 1319 north of Mt. Washington	
KY 663	US 431 / Mortimer Road north of Adairville	KY 103 south of Auburn	
KY 664	US 431 northeast of Oakville	KY 383 southwest of Franklin	
KY 665	KY 664	KY 100 / George Taylor Road southeast of Middleton	
KY 666	KY 871 northeast of Raleigh	KY 130 north of Chapman	
KY 667	KY 492 / KY 1508 in Dekoven	KY 871 southeast of Raleigh	
KY 668	KY 667	KY 109 northwest of Henshaw	
KY 669	East Market Street in Waverly	Locust Lane / Yancy Greenwell Road southeast of Hitesville	
KY 670	KY 109 near Providence	US 41 Alt. in Providence	
KY 671	KY 100 at Oak Forest	KY 98 southeast of Maynard	
KY 672	KY 126 / KY 128 southwest of Cobb	US 62 southwest of Dawson Springs	
KY 673	KY 11 (now Bus. KY 11) in Flemingsburg	KY 597 (Mt. Gilead Road)	Removed by 1977 and became part of rerouted KY 597
KY 674	Bugwood Road	KY 92 northwest of Parnell	
KY 675	KY 103 in Auburn	KY 1038 in Gasper	Removed by 1977; now Liberty Church Road
KY 676	US 127 in Frankfort	US 60 / US 421 in Frankfort	Formed from 1977 to 1983
KY 676	KY 106 west of Lewisburg	KY 178 in Logan County	Removed by 1977; now KY 2376
KY 677	KY 314 southwest of Center	US 31E northeast of Canmer	
KY 678	KY 87 near Akersville	KY 163 near Rockbridge	
KY 679	New Liberty Road	KY 478 at Duckrun	
KY 680	KY 80 south-southeast of Eastern	US 23 / US 460 / KY 80 in Harold	
KY 681	Buchanan Road on the Nicholas County line	KY 32 west of Cowan	
KY 682	KY 55 southeast of Coburg	KY 2971 northwest of Absher	
KY 683	KY 92 in Stearns	KY 1651	Removed 1993; now Shirt Factory Road
KY 684	KY 683 in Stearns	KY 1567	Removed 1993; now Apple Tree Road
KY 685	KY 1297 at Beckton	KY 70 east of Cave City	
KY 686	US 460 / KY 11 in Mount Sterling	US 60 in Mount Sterling	
KY 687	KY 472 southwest of Langnau	US 421 / KY 11 in Manchester	
KY 688	US 641 / KY 91 in Marion	US 641 / KY 91 in Crayne	Removed 2002; now Reiters View Road and Chapel Hill Road
KY 689	KY 172	KY 1092 in Flatgap	
KY 690	KY 79 / KY 259 in Westview	KY 333 / Rosetta-Corners Road at Corners	
KY 691	Ellington	KY 90 west of Burkesville	
KY 692	KY 192 east of Somerset	KY 80 / Shopville Road southwest of Shopville	
KY 693	US 23 in Wurtland	US 23 in Russell	
KY 694	KY 1 / KY 7 in Grayson	Stearns	Established 1988 and removed 1994; became part of KY 9
KY 694	KY 479 south of Millerstown	KY 728 in Wheelers Mill	Removed by 1977; now Wheeler Mill Road
KY 695	KY 164 near Peedee	KY 107 south in Hopkinsville	
KY 696	US 127 Business southeast of Albany	KY 1009 northwest of Windy	
KY 697	KY 1336 south of Tilton	KY 32 southeast of Flemingsburg	
KY 698	KY 198 southwest of Mount Salem	US 27 south of Stanford	
KY 699	KY 80 near Wooton	KY 7 near Cornettsville	

== 700–799 ==
Number	Southern or western terminus	Northern or eastern terminus	Notes
KY 700	Boat ramp along the Big South Fork of the Cumberland River	KY 90 south of Honeybee	
KY 701	KY 92 east of Smith Town	KY 1651 southwest of Whitley City	
KY 702	Neal Howard Creek Road southwest of Little Sandy	KY 7 at Little Sandy	
KY 703	US 51 in Clinton	KY 307 / O'Neal Road north of Nichols	
KY 704	KY 61 north of Burkesville	KY 55 south of Columbia	
KY 705	KY 844 at Salem	KY 772 northwest of Bonny	
KY 706	KY 172 in Crockett	KY 7 northeast of Green	
KY 707	KY 3 northwest of Fallsburg	US 23 at Buchanan	
KY 708	KY 30 in Lerose	Spencer Bend Road on the Breathitt County line northeast of Fillmore	
KY 709	US 27 in Alexandria	AA Hwy (KY 9) in Alexandria	Established 1999
KY 709	Corbin Dam	I-75/US 25E in Corbin	Removed by 1977 and renumbered KY 1783; now City Dam Road and KY 770
KY 710	KY 428 near Guston	KY 448 in Brandenburg	
KY 711	Redwine Road / Clevitt Branch Road east of Redwine	KY 173 on the Rowan County line northwest of Wyett	
KY 712	KY 146 in LaGrange	KY 153 in Jericho	
KY 713	US 460 near Grassy Lick	US 460 in Frenchburg	
KY 714	Southville	US 60 south of Guist Creek Lake	
KY 715	KY 11 near Zachariah	KY 77 in Red River Gorge	
KY 716	US 60 in Summit	KY 5 in Summit	
KY 717	KY 842 / I-71 / I-75 in Florence	KY 3076 in Erlanger	Established 1987
KY 717	KY 107 in Hopkinsville	US 41 Alt. in Hopkinsville	Removed by 1980; now 21st Street
KY 718	KY 223 / Walker Road at Dewitt	Paint Gap Branch Road / Pigeon Fork Road northeast of Erose	
KY 719	Laurel Fork Road at the Morgan County line north of Elkfork	KY 32 at Fannin	
KY 720	Mt. Hebron Road / Floyd Clark Road / St. Paul Road northeast of Tar Hill	KY 84 in Sonora	
KY 721	KY 1088 southeast of Cordia	KY 550 at Fisty	
KY 722	KY 1588	US 68	
KY 723	Cumberland River in Pinckneyville	KY 135 / School Avenue in Tolu	
KY 724	KY 3520 northeast of Future City	KY 358 southeast of Grahamville	
KY 725	KY 305 at West Paducah	KY 358 west of Rossington	
KY 726	US 62 northeast of Lovelaceville	KY 725 west of Heath	
KY 727	US 25W near Corbin	US 25W in Corbin	
KY 728	KY 259 near Bee Spring	KY 357 at Hammonville	
KY 729	US 68 south of Liletown	KY 218 southwest of Pierce	
KY 730	KY 903 north of Lamasco	Water Street in Eddyville	
KY 731	US 45 / US 62 in Paducah	US 60 / Downs Drive in Paducah	
KY 732	KY 94 / Todd Road near Van Cleave	Waterview Lane / Richard Lane east of Boatwright	
KY 733	KY 61 northeast of Lebanon Junction	US 62 at Cravens	
KY 734	US 127 / KY 90 north of Snow	US 127 northwest of Ida	
KY 735	KY 10 at Flagg Spring	KY 8 in Mentor	
KY 736	KY 79 / Lawrence Hayes Road southwest of Caneyville	KY 110 south of Falling Branch	
KY 737	KY 259 in Leitchfield	KY 259 near McDaniels	
KY 738	Wolf River Dock on Dale Hollow Lake north of the Tennessee state line	US 127 Bus. in Albany	
KY 739	KY 1041 southeast of Dripping Spring	KY 96 northwest of Oakville	
KY 740	US 68 / KY 80 east of Glasgow	KY 677 at the Barren–Hart county line	
KY 741	KY 742 west of Revelo	KY 1651	
KY 742	Mine 18 Road at the boundary of Big South Fork National River and Recreation Area	KY 1651 at Revelo	
KY 743	US 31W west of Tuckertown	KY 422 south of Pig	
KY 744	KY 210 / Fallen Timber Road southwest of Durhamtown	KY 337 north of Mannsville	
KY 745	US 68 east of Sulphur Well	KY 487 south of Exie	
KY 746	KY 191 near Campton	US 460 near Denniston	
KY 747	KY 94 in Murray	KY 1327 in Murray	Removed by 1980; now 18th Street
KY 748	KY 774 / KY 1327 in Murray	Murray	
KY 749	Hickory Grove	KY 513 near McBrayer	
KY 750	KY 244 / KY 3105 in Raceland	US 23 in Russell	
KY 751	Keno	US 27 near Tateville	
KY 752	KY 1937 near Boltsfork	Durbin	
KY 753	US 27 near Bryantsville	KY 1845 near Buena Vista	
KY 754	Wises Landing	US 42 in Bedford	
KY 755	KY 173 near The Ridge	KY 556 in Bell City	
KY 756	US 41 Alt. in Hopkinsville	KY 1027 near Longview	
KY 757	KY 1937 near Mavity	Savage Branch	
KY 758	Bordley	KY 56 near Breckinridge Center	
KY 759	KY 1470 in Strunk	US 27	Removed 1986; now Strunk Highway- original alignment is now Lum Strunk Road
KY 760	US 60 in Waverly	King Mills	
KY 761	Rankin	KY 235 near Nancy	
KY 762	KY 764 in Bells Run	KY 142 in Habit	
KY 763	KY 137 in Bayou	US 60 in Burna	
KY 764	US 231 south of Masonville	KY 144 west of Pellville	
KY 765	Hilltop	KY 664 near Schochoh	
KY 766	KY 5 in Ironville	US 60 in Ironville	
KY 767	KY 439 in Columbia	Hatcher	
KY 767	KY 61 near Mount Gilead	Mount Gilead	
KY 768	KY 61 near Milltown	KY 92 near Montpelier	
KY 769	Northfield	KY 80 Bus. in Somerset	
KY 770	KY 312 in rural southwest Laurel County	I-75 / US 25E near North Corbin	
KY 771	Ribbon	KY 379 near Ribbon	
KY 772	US 460 near Ezel	KY 519 near Yocum	
KY 773	KY 7 near Grayson	KY 3 in Boltsfork	
KY 774	KY 121 in Murray	KY 748 / KY 1327 in Murray	
KY 775	US 79 near Olmstead	KY 1041 near Lickskillet	
KY 776	KY 92 near Monticello	Denney	
KY 777	KY 80 in Garrett	KY 2554 west of Langley	
KY 778	KY 139 in Cadiz	KY 93 near Lamasco	
KY 779	KY 26 near Wofford	KY 11 in Gausdale	
KY 780	US 51 in Clinton	KY 58 near Bugg	
KY 781	KY 116 near Jordan	KY 1529 near Moscow	
KY 782	KY 795 near Harris Hill Ford	US 68 near Draffenville	
KY 783	KY 893 near Crossland	Wadesboro	
KY 784	KY 1 near Hopewell	KY 7 in Sunshine	
KY 785	KY 32 near Hilda	Smile	
KY 786	KY 339 near Wurth	KY 305 near Future City	
KY 787	Bryans Ford	KY 131 in Reidland	
KY 788	US 41A at Fort Campbell	Fort Campbell Gate 7	Established 2012
KY 788	US 60 in Paducah	Pines Road in Paducah	Removed 1984; now Friedman Lane
KY 789	KY 92 near Swifton	Eadsville	
KY 790	Pueblo	KY 90 in Bronston	
KY 791	Barthell	KY 92 in Smith Town	
KY 792	KY 382 in Gamaliel	KY 100 near Gamaliel	
KY 793	KY 61 near Greensburg	US 68 near Bluff Boom	
KY 794	KY 1705 near North Irvine	KY 89 near Hargett	
KY 795	US 641 / KY 58 near Scale	Sharpe	
KY 796	KY 136 in Beech Grove	KY 797 near Mount Vernon	
KY 797	KY 256 in Lemon	KY 136 near Wyman	
KY 798	KY 136 near Buel	KY 140 in Reeves	
KY 799	US 60 in Gates	Waltz	

== 800–899 ==
Name	Southern or western terminus	Northern or eastern terminus	Notes
KY 800	KY 109 north of Era	KY 107 north of Bluff Spring	
KY 801	KY 519 near Paragon	KY 158 near Colfax	
KY 802	KY 121 near Blandville	US 60 in La Center	
KY 803	KY 113 near Millstone	Neon	
KY 804	Quinton	US 27 near Tateville	Established 1987
KY 804	KY 805 in Kona	US 119 in Kona	Removed 1978; became part of KY 805; originally continued to Payne Gap until US 119 was rerouted by 1976
KY 805	US 119 in Kona	US 23 in Dorton	
KY 806	Eolia	US 119 in Oven Fork	
KY 807	KY 164 in Donaldson	KY 139 near Donaldson	
KY 808	KY 123 near Scott	KY 123 near South Columbus	
KY 809	US 51	KY 288 west of New Cypress	Removed 1983; now Perry Road
KY 810	Twin Lakes	KY 93 / KY 819 near Suwanee	
KY 811	US 60 in Beals	US 60 in Reed	
KY 812	KY 1078 near Zion	Henderson	
KY 813	KY 189 at Apex	US 41 in Mortons Gap	
KY 814	KY 109 near Nebo	US 41 Alt. in Providence	
KY 815	KY 81 near Calhoun	KY 56 in West Louisville	
KY 816	Providence	KY 383 near Franklin	
KY 817	KY 70 in Liberty	US 127 in Liberty	Established 1993
KY 817	Lake Barkley	KY 164 near Linton	Removed 1983; now Graham School Road
KY 818	KY 730 near Saratoga	US 62 near Saratoga	
KY 819	KY 93 / KY 810 near Suwanee	KY 93 near Kuttawa	
KY 820	KY 249 west of Etoile	KY 63 north of Mount Hermon	
KY 821	KY 822 in Murray	US 641 in Murray	
KY 822	KY 1550 in Murray	KY 94 in Murray	
KY 823	KY 477 in Raymond	KY 261 near Haysville	
KY 824	US 27 near Aspen Grove	KY 1121 in Persimmon Grove	
KY 825	KY 40 near Oil Springs	KY 1428 near Hagerhill	
KY 826	US 60 in Midland	KY 801 near Farmers	
KY 827	KY 7 in Lynn	US 23 near Greenup	
KY 828	Irad	KY 1 near Yatesville	
KY 829	KY 90 near Nora	KY 558 in Cumberland City	
KY 830	US 25W in North Corbin	KY 80 at Laurel River	
KY 831	KY 171 near Bivins	KY 890 near Bivins	
KY 832	KY 619 near Rose Crossroads	KY 379 near Rose Crossroads	
KY 833	KY 92 in Monticello	KY 1275 near Monticello	
KY 834	KY 200 in Hidalgo	KY 1546 in Ramsey Island	
KY 835	US 31W/US 60 in West Point	US 31W/US 60 in West Point	Removed 1994; now Bus. US 31W
KY 836	US 25W near Clio	KY 511 near Walden	
KY 837	Dorena	KY 501 in Duncan	
KY 838	KY 135 in Hampton	KY 723 near Irma	
KY 839	KY 63 near Tompkinsville	KY 90 near Eighty-Eight	
KY 840	US 119 in Tremont	US 421 in Baxter	
KY 841	US 31W / US 60 in Valley Station	Lewis and Clark Bridge	
KY 842	US 25 in Florence	KY 236 in Erlanger	Established 1987
KY 842	KY 53	Dugansville Road in Ballard	Removed by 1977; now Ballard Road
KY 843	KY 1195	US 68 in Penick	Removed by 1980; now Mays Chapel Road
KY 844	KY 205 in Salem	KY 191 in Stacy Fork	
KY 845	US 127 north of Monterey	US 127 at Long Ridge	
KY 846	KY 3630 near Sturgeon	KY 11 in Conkling	
KY 847	KY 30 at Travellers Rest	KY 3536 at Levi	
KY 848	US 41 / KY 104 in Trenton	KY 102 west of Keysburg	
KY 849	KY 307 near Cunningham	KY 131 in Kaler	
KY 850	KY 550 in Midas	KY 404 in Goodloe	
KY 851	Evelyn	KY 89 in South Irvine	
KY 852	Blackburn Church	KY 139 in Shady Grove	Removed 1979; now Blackburn Church Road
KY 853	KY 189 near Jarrells	KY 171 near Bivins	
KY 854	US 60 near Norton Branch	KY 1937 near Mavity	
KY 855	KY 902 near Frances	US 60 near New Salem	
KY 856	US 25W in Williamsburg	US 25W near Highland Park	
KY 857	KY 132 in Free Union	Shelton	
KY 858	KY 90 near Bethesda	KY 200 in Bethesda	
KY 859	US 60 east of Lexington	KY 57	
KY 860	KY 170 at Flemingsburg Junction	KY 1200 near Flemingsburg Junction	
KY 861	KY 640 in Randolph	US 68 in Edmonton	
KY 862	US 41 near Hanson	KY 2082 near Anton	
KY 863	Dobbins	KY 486 in Dobbins	
KY 864	KY 2053 in southern Jefferson County	US 31E / East Jefferson Street in Louisville	
KY 865	KY 70 near Clarence	KY 328 near Bee Lick	
KY 866	KY 93 near Newbern	KY 70 near Tiline	
KY 867	KY 1090 in Lakeville	KY 1888 in Ivyton	
KY 868	Muldraugh	US 31W / KY 1638 in Muldraugh	
KY 869	KY 70 near Node	KY 314 in Center	
KY 870	KY 1366 in Gum Tree	KY 63 in Mud Lick	
KY 871	KY 360 near Spring Grove	KY 360 near Uniontown	
KY 872	US 231 in Greenwood	US 231 in Alvaton	Removed by 1982; now KY 2629
KY 873	US 421 near Botto	KY 149 in Hector	
KY 873	KY 2839 near Wanamaker	US 41 Alt. near Wanamaker	
KY 874	KY 270 in Lisman	KY 1340 near Lisman	
KY 875	KY 165 near Hittville	KY 1159 near Rock Springs	
KY 876	KY 595 west of Richmond	US 25 / US 421 in Richmond	
KY 877	KY 123 in Berkley	US 51 in Arlington	
KY 878	KY 69 near Sulphur Springs	KY 54 north of Yeaman	
KY 879	KY 112 in Southard	KY 1337 near Richland	
KY 880	US 231 / US 231 Bus. in Bowling Green	KY 234 in Bowling Green	
KY 881	US 119 near Blackburn Bottom	Heenon	
KY 882	KY 1010 near Ezel	US 460 near Ezel	
KY 883	US 68 near Wrights	KY 210 near Sweeneyville	
KY 884	KY 240 in Woodburn	US 231 in Bowling Green	
KY 885	KY 7 near Green	Ibex	
KY 886	KY 144 near Rhodelia	KY 144 near Frymire	
KY 887	Birmingham	Birmingham	
KY 888	KY 367 near Nepton	KY 161 near Flemingsburg Junction	
KY 889	Ponderosa	KY 88 near Johnson Crossroads	
KY 890	KY 107 / KY 181 at Clifty	KY 181 west of Rosewood	
KY 891	KY 85 in Buttonsberry	KY 138 in Underwood	
KY 892	KY 254 in Madisonville	KY 862 near Anton	
KY 893	KY 121 / KY 1124 near Coldwater	KY 121 near New Providence	
KY 894	KY 121 in Murray	KY 121 southeast of Murray	Removed 1993; now Old Salem Road and Applewood Road, previously continued south via current KY 1497
KY 895	KY 204 in Redbird	KY 204 near Clio	
KY 896	KY 90 near Honeybee	Sawyer	
KY 897	KY 368	KY 1797	Removed 2012; now Kays Branch Road
KY 898	US 127 near Indian Hills	US 127 near Peaks Mill	
KY 899	KY 160 in Brinkley	KY 7 near Raven	

== 900–999 ==
Number	Southern or western terminus	Northern or eastern terminus	Notes
KY 900	KY 3265 in Cundiff	KY 55 in Glens Fork	
KY 901	KY 551 near Columbia	KY 1323 near Garlin	
KY 902	KY 70 in Dycusburg	KY 139 in Creswell	
KY 903	KY 93 / KY 1097 in Lamasco	KY 293 near Princeton	
KY 904	KY 92 in Yaden	KY 92 in Siler	
KY 905	KY 1824 in Hardin	KY 402 in Hardin	
KY 906	US 127 near Middleburg	Butchertown	
KY 907	US 31W in Louisville	KY 1020 in Louisville	
KY 908	McClure	KY 292 near Job	
KY 909	Hazel Patch	US 25 near Hazel Patch	
KY 910	KY 80 near Horntown	US 127 in Phil	
KY 911	US 41 Alt. in Oak Grove	KY 115 in Oak Grove	
KY 912	KY 704 near Bakerton	Bakerton	
KY 913	KY 155 in Jeffersontown	US 60 in Middletown	
KY 913C	KY 1819 in Louisville	Blankenbaker Parkway in Louisville	
KY 914	Cumberland Parkway in Somerset	KY 80 / Hal Rogers Parkway in Somerset	Established 1995
KY 914	US 62 near Fairdealing	Kentucky Lake	Removed 1981; now Cross Road
KY 915	US 27 in Claryville	AA Hwy (KY 9) in Wilder	Established 1994
KY 915	Homer	KY 79 near Russellville	Removed 1989; now Homer Road
KY 916	KY 210 near Hodgenville	KY 210 near Jericho	
KY 917	US 62 near Lake City	KY 866 near Tiline	
KY 918	Blue Spring	KY 1489 near Blue Spring	
KY 919	KY 878 in Ohio County	KY 54	
KY 920	US 62 in Leitchfield	KY 1600 near Vine Grove	
KY 921	KY 98 near Walnut Hill	KY 249 near Dry Fork	
KY 922	US 60 in Lexington	KY 620 north of Georgetown	
KY 923	Grangertown	KY 141 near Sullivan	
KY 924	KY 781 near Cayce	KY 1529 near East Beelerton	
KY 925	Blue Pond	KY 309 in Brownsville	
KY 926	KY 390 near Duncan	KY 1160 in Dugansville	
KY 927	Nevelsville	US 27 near Wiborg	
KY 928	KY 36 near Weston	KY 57 near Sprout	
KY 929	KY 139 in Cadiz	US 68 Bus. in Cadiz	
KY 930	KY 225 in Artemus	US 25E near Flat Lick	
KY 931	KY 160 near Kings Creek	KY 7 near Colson	
KY 932	US 119 east of Oven Fork	State Route 671 in Wise County, Virginia	
KY 933	KY 1638 in Doe Valley	KY 313 near Brandenburg Station	
KY 934	KY 39 in Woodstock	KY 461 near Walnut Grove	
KY 935	KY 39 near Bandy	KY 934 near Walnut Grove	
KY 936	KY 357 near Jonesville	KY 566 near Lobb	
KY 937	US 60 near Smithland	KY 453 near Newbern	
KY 938	Brassfield	Bybee	
KY 939	Pack Church	KY 138 west of Calhoun	Removed 2005; now Pack Church Road
KY 940	KY 80 near South Highland	KY 464 near Mayfield	
KY 941	KY 1238 near Bewleyville	KY 144 in Ekron	
KY 942	KY 1088	Knott/Perry County Line northeast of Jeff	Removed 1988; originally continued south to Jeff; now Elk Fork Road
KY 943	KY 129 near Feliciana	KY 94 near Water Valley	
KY 944	KY 58 near Fulgham	US 45 in Wingo	
KY 945	KY 121 near Hickory	KY 339 near Kansas	
KY 946	KY 746 in Pomeroyton	US 460 near Ezel	
KY 947	KY 871 near Raleigh	KY 56 in Morganfield	
KY 948	KY 947 near Chapman	KY 130 near Chapman	
KY 949	US 431 at Penrod	KY 106 at Huntsville	
KY 950	US 60 near Shrote	KY 758 near Cullen	
KY 951	KY 144 in Knottsville	KY 1389 in Gatewood	
KY 952	Grand Rivers	US 62 in Lake City	
KY 953	KY 214 near Raydure	KY 61 near Kettle	
KY 954	KY 52 in Manse	KY 21 near Wallaceton	
KY 955	KY 504 near Jacobs	KY 174 in Lawton	
KY 956	KY 595 north of Berea	US 25 north of Berea	Established 2008
KY 956	Louisville	Louisville	Established 1991 and removed 1995
KY 956	KY 4 in Lexington	KY 57 (now Burns Road) near East Union	Removed by 1976; now part of rerouted KY 57
KY 957	US 31W in Plum Springs	KY 526 north of Plum Springs	
KY 958	US 68 near Montgomery	KY 276 near Montgomery	
KY 959	KY 80 near Bliss	KY 768 in Milltown	
KY 960	Birk City	KY 1554	
KY 961	US 231 at Alvaton	KY 234 at Claypool	
KY 962	KY 402 near Joppa	US 68 in Fairdealing	
KY 963	US 68 northeast of Benton	Cambridge Shores	Removed 1997; now Moors Camp Highway
KY 964	KY 663 north of Adairville	Trimble Road	Removed outside of the bridge 1991; bridge removed 2000; now Loy Moore Road
KY 965	KY 713 in Hope	US 60 near Peasticks	
KY 966	KY 3 near Mavity	US 60 in Coalton	
KY 967	US 60 in Smithland	US 60	
KY 968	Static	KY 415 near Savage	
KY 969	US 127 in Bug	KY 968 near Cedar Knob	
KY 970	KY 1322 in Massac	US 62 in Paducah	
KY 971	Tyler	KY 653 near Bondurant	
KY 972	KY 732 near Boatwright	Faxon	
KY 973	KY 181 west of Rosewood	US 431 at Dunmor	
KY 974	KY 1923 in Winchester	KY 1960 in Kiddville	
KY 975	KY 1182 near Tipton Ridge	Fitchburg	
KY 976	Kellacey	KY 519 near Zag	
KY 977	KY 52 in Waco	Kentucky River	
KY 978	KY 36 in Owenton	US 127 in New Liberty	Removed 2011; now part of KY 227
KY 979	KY 122 north-northeast of Buckingham	KY 680 / KY 1426 in Harold	
KY 980	US 231 / US 31E west of Scottsville	KY 100 in Scottsville	Established 1988
KY 980	US 68 / KY 80 west of Auburn	KY 663 in Friendship	Removed 1982
KY 981	US 60 in Marion	KY 91 in Marion	
KY 982	US 62 near Broadwell	KY 32 in Cynthiana	
KY 983	US 41 Alt. in Dixon	KY 56 near Boxville	
KY 984	Cottageville	KY 57 near Poplar Flat	
KY 985	KY 772 near Twentysix	Kellacey	
KY 986	US 60 / KY 2 in Olive Hill	KY 7 in Sophi	
KY 987	Bell - Harlan County Line	US 421	
KY 988	Colmar	KY 188 near Colmar	
KY 989	KY 344 in Pleasureville	KY 9 in Charters	
KY 990	KY 3001 in Lenarue	Mary Helen	
KY 991	Three Point	KY 987 near Cawood	
KY 992	KY 144 near Cloverport	KY 259 in Hardinsburg	
KY 993	KY 581 in Tutor Key	US 23 in Nippa	
KY 994	KY 849 in Boaz	US 60 in Paducah	
KY 995	US 60 near Cimota City	KY 725 near Cimota City	
KY 996	Ceredo	Chiles	
KY 997	KY 157 near Sulphur	US 421 in Campbellsburg	
KY 998	US 62 in Spring Hill	KY 305 in Paducah	
KY 999	US 45 near Yopp	KY 1954 in Krebs	

== See also ==
- List of primary state highways in Kentucky
