= List of Kentucky supplemental roads and rural secondary highways (300–399) =

Kentucky roads

Kentucky supplemental roads and rural secondary highways (300–399)
- Highway markers for KY 300 and KY 399

Highway names
- Interstates: Interstate nn (I-nn)
- US Highways: U.S. Highway nn (US nn)
- State: KY nn

System links
- Kentucky State Highway System; Interstate; US; State; Parkways
- Supplemental/Rural Secondary; 1–199; 200–299; 300–399; 400–499; 500–599; 600–699; 700–799; 800–899; 900–999; 1000–1499; 1500–1999; 2000–2499; 2500–2999; 3000–3499; 3500–6999

Kentucky supplemental roads and rural secondary highways are the lesser two of the four functional classes of highways constructed and maintained by the Kentucky Transportation Cabinet, the state-level agency that constructs and maintains highways in Kentucky. The agency splits its inventory of state highway mileage into four categories:

- The State Primary System includes Interstate Highways, Parkways, and other long-distance highways of statewide importance that connect the state's major cities, including much of the courses of Kentucky's U.S. Highways.
- The State Secondary System includes highways of regional importance that connect the state's smaller urban centers, including those county seats not served by the state primary system.
- The Rural Secondary System includes highways of local importance, such as farm-to-market roads and urban collectors.
- Supplemental Roads are the set of highways not in the first three systems, including frontage roads, bypassed portions of other state highways, and rural roads that only serve their immediate area.

The same-numbered highway can comprise sections of road under different categories. This list contains descriptions of Supplemental Roads and highways in the Rural Secondary System numbered 300 to 399 that do not have portions within the State Primary and State Secondary systems.

== KY 301 ==
Kentucky Route 301
- Location: Hicksville–Dogwood
- Length: 6.210 mi (9.994 km)

Kentucky Route 301 is a 6.210-mile-long (9.994 km) rural secondary highway in eastern Graves County. The highway begins at KY 58 next to Pryor Branch of Panther Creek southwest of Hicksville. KY 301 heads north and crosses over I-69 (Purchase Parkway). The highway crosses Pull Tight Branch and Cockes Branch south of Clear Springs, which the highway passes through between its junction with the east end of KY 483 and its crossing of Trace Creek. KY 301 gradually curves west and crosses Dry Creek before reaching its northern terminus at KY 131 south of Dogwood.

== KY 306 ==
Kentucky Route 306
- Location: Wheelwright–Wheelwright Junction
- Length: 2.088 mi (3.360 km)

Kentucky Route 306 is a 2.088-mile-long (3.360 km) rural secondary highway in southern Floyd County. The highway begins at the junction of Branham Hollow Road and Stoker Branch Road at the south city limit of Wheelwright. KY 306 heads north along the Right Fork Otter Creek through the center of Wheelwright and past the Otter Creek Correctional Center. North of the confluence of the right and left forks of Otter Creek, the highway follows Otter Creek proper out of the city to Wheelwright Junction, where the route crosses Left Fork Beaver Creek and reaches its northern terminus at KY 122.

== KY 308 ==
Kentucky Route 308
- Location: Forest Hills
- Length: 2.697 mi (4.340 km)

Kentucky Route 308 is a 2.697-mile-long (4.340 km) rural secondary highway in northern Pike County. The highway begins at Forest Hills Road's intersection with Kate Camp Branch Road south of Forest Hills. KY 308 follows Forest Hills Road north through the valley of the Road Fork of Pond Creek. The highway reaches its terminus near the confluence of the Road Fork with Pond Creek at US 119 opposite Belfry High School.

== KY 310 ==
Kentucky Route 310
- Location: LaCenter–Oscar
- Length: 6.550 mi (10.541 km)

Kentucky Route 310 is a 6.550-mile-long (10.541 km) rural secondary highway in northern Ballard County. The highway begins at US 60 (Paducah Road) east of LaCenter. KY 310 heads northwest along Dennis Jones Road, which crosses Frazier Creek. At KY 358 (Bandana Road), the route's name changes to Turner Landing Road. KY 310 crosses Lucy Creek and passes through a pair of right-angle curves before reaching its terminus at KY 1105 (Oscar Road) at Oscar.

=== History ===
KY 310 was formed in 1954.

The original KY 310 ran from US 25W west via Cemetery Road in Williamsburg; this route was later reinstated as KY 2380 until October 14, 1981.

== KY 311 ==
Kentucky Route 311
- Location: Blue Pond
- Length: 3.192 mi (5.137 km)

Kentucky Route 311 is a 3.192-mile-long (5.137 km) rural secondary highway in southwestern Fulton County. The highway begins at the Tennessee state line, where the road continues south as Tennessee State Route 157. KY 311 heads north and crosses Owens Slough, intersects KY 1282 west of Blue Pond, intersects the Illinois Central Railroad at grade, and reaches its northern terminus at KY 94 west of Anna Lynne.

== KY 314 ==
Kentucky Route 314
- Location: Halfway–Shady Grove
- Length: 9.809 mi (15.786 km)

Kentucky Route 314 is a 9.809-mile-long (15.786 km) rural secondary highway in eastern Barren County and northern Metcalfe County. The highway begins at KY 70 (Hiseville Road) at Halfway. KY 314 heads east along Center Road, which crosses Straders Branch and Blue Springs Creek before the route meets the west end of KY 2435 (Knob Lick–Blue Springs Road) at the Barren–Metcalfe county line. The highway continues on Hiseville–Center Road, which passes through Savoyard and meets the south end of KY 677 (Roberts Road) as the route approaches Center. At the west end of the village, KY 314 meets Sulphur Well Center Road, which carries KY 869 and KY 1243. KY 314 and KY 1243 comprise Main Street through the village. At the east end of the village, the two routes meet the west end of KY 1048 (Node Road) and diverge, KY 1243 onto Center Three Springs Road and KY 314 onto Center Peggyville Road. KY 314 continues north to its terminus at KY 218 (Crail Hope Road) at Shady Grove.

== KY 315 ==
Kentucky Route 315
- Location: Crockettsville–Shoulderblade
- Length: 11.451 mi (18.429 km)

Kentucky Route 315 is a 11.451-mile-long (18.429 km) rural secondary highway in southern Breathitt County. The highway begins at KY 28 south of Crockettsville. KY 315 heads east along Freemans Fork to its confluence with the Middle Fork Kentucky River, which the route follows through Crockettsville. The highway meets the west end of KY 1933 and passes through Sebastians Branch. North of Sebastians Branch, KY 315 parallels KY 3237 from the opposite side of the Middle Fork Kentucky River to both routes' termini at KY 30 south of Shoulderblade.

== KY 316 ==
Kentucky Route 316
- Location: Carmon–Providence
- Length: 7.755 mi (12.480 km)

Kentucky Route 316 is a 7.755-mile-long (12.480 km) rural secondary highway in southeastern Trimble County. The highway begins at US 421 southwest of Carmon. KY 316 heads northeast through the valley of the Little Kentucky River through Carmon, where the route crosses Carmon Creek. The highway crosses Daughterty Creek at its confluence with the river and meets the south end of KY 1335, where KY 316 turns east. KY 316 follows Daughterty Creek and leaves the creek valley to pass through the hamlet of Providence before reaching its eastern terminus at KY 55.

== KY 318 ==
Kentucky Route 318
- Location: Glasgow
- Existed: 1992

Kentucky Route 318 was a former highway in Barren County. It was formed by 1973, running from US 31E & KY 90 east via Happy Valley Road to Bus. US 31E in Glasgow. replacing a section of KY 90 which was rerouted. The road was given to the city of Glasgow on February 3, 1992.

The original KY 318 ran from US 27 in Falmouth southwest to KY 1032 (now Crooked Creek Road) east of Cordova. This became part of an extended KY 330 when KY 1032 was rerouted further south.

== KY 320 ==
Kentucky Route 320
- Location: Carrollton
- Length: 2.384 mi (3.837 km)

Kentucky Route 320 is a 2.384-mile-long (3.837 km) supplemental road in northern Carroll County. The highway begins at a dead end next to Kentucky River Lock & Dam No. 1 on the Kentucky River. KY 320 heads west as Lock Road, which gradually curves northward. The highway enters the city of Carrollton on 11th Street; just north of the city limit, the highway passes an entrance to General Butler State Resort Park. KY 320 reaches its northern terminus at US 42 (Highland Avenue).

== KY 322 ==
Kentucky Route 322
- Location: Chestnut Grove–Smithfield
- Length: 4.543 mi (7.311 km)

Kentucky Route 322 is a 4.543-mile-long (7.311 km) rural secondary highway in northern Shelby County and southern Henry County. The highway begins at KY 53 (La Grange Road) north of Chestnut Grove. KY 322 heads north along Lucas Road into Henry County, where the route intersects KY 22 (Ballardsville Road). The highway continues as McCoun Road to its northern terminus at KY 1861 (Mill Street and Main Street) and Giltner Road in the city of Smithfield.

== KY 323 ==
Kentucky Route 323
- Location: Eve; Gabe–Campbellsville
- Length: 23.015 mi (37.039 km)

Kentucky Route 323 is a 23.015-mile-long (37.039 km) rural secondary highway in northern Green County and western Taylor County that has two segments. The 3.395-mile-long (5.464 km) western segment begins at KY 566 (Eve Road) at Eve. KY 323 follows Aetna Grove Church Road south and then northeast through the valley of the Green River to Graham Cemetery Road. The 19.620-mile-long (31.575 km) eastern section begins on the east side of the Green River and follows Nears Milby Road to Poplar School Grove Road, where the route continues on Gabe Road through Gabe to KY 61 (Hodgenville Road) in the village of Summersville. KY 337 continues east on Summersville Road, which meets the south end of KY 2763 (Summersville–Coakley Road) and crosses Sand Lick Creek before entering Taylor County. The highway continues along Bengal Road, which crosses Big Pitman Creek at Bengal and Middle Pitman Creek north of Sweeneyville. In Sweeneyville, KY 337 intersects KY 883 (Fairview Road) and continues along Friendship Pike, which heads southeast and crosses Little Pitman Creek. At the western edge of the city of Campbellsville, the highway intersects US 68 (Greensburg Road) and curves east onto Main Street. KY 337 crosses over KY 55 (New Columbia Road) and passes Campbellsville High School on its way to downtown Campbellsville. There, the highway crosses Buckhorn Creek and turns north onto Columbia Avenue for two blocks to its terminus at US 68 (Broadway).

== KY 324 ==
Kentucky Route 324
- Location: Shannon–Weedonia
- Length: 10.766 mi (17.326 km)

Kentucky Route 324 is a 10.766-mile-long (17.326 km) supplemental road in southern Mason County. The highway begins at US 62 (Bucktown Road) south of Shannon. KY 324 heads south along Raymond Road, which crosses a branch of Shannon Creek, before the route veers east. The highway intersects KY 2517 (Main Street) in Mays Lick. East of the village, KY 324 intersects US 68 and meets the north end of KY 161 (Flemingsburg–Mays Lick Road), where the route continues as Helena Road. The highway meets the south end of KY 419 (Wards Pike), intersects the Transkentucky Transportation Railroad, and meets the north end of KY 170 (Elizaville Road). KY 324 passes through Helena and crosses Mill Creek before reaching its eastern terminus at KY 11 at Weedonia.

=== History ===
KY 324 was formed between 1973 and 1976 as a renumbering of part of KY 24 because of I-24.

The original KY 324 ran from US 45 in Wingo east to KY 564 east of Sedalia. This became part of KY 339 by 1973 when it was extended east.

== KY 325 ==
Kentucky Route 325
- Location: Moxley–New Liberty
- Length: 5.642 mi (9.080 km)

Kentucky Route 325 is a 5.642-mile-long (9.080 km) rural secondary highway in western Owen County. The highway begins at KY 355 next to Little Twin Creek's confluence with the Kentucky River at Moxley. KY 325 heads northeast along New Liberty–Moxley Road, which crosses Little Twin Creek then remains to the south of the creek, where the route meets the south end of KY 1669. The highway reaches its eastern terminus at KY 227 west of New Liberty.

== KY 326 ==
Kentucky Route 326
- Location: Lawrenceburg–Ninevah
- Length: 2.761 mi (4.443 km)

Kentucky Route 326 is a 2.761-mile-long (4.443 km) rural secondary highway in northeastern Anderson County. The highway begins at US 127 (Frankfort Road) at the northern edge of the city of Lawrenceburg. KY 326 heads north along Ninevah Road, which crosses Hammond Creek and turns east at Hammond Road on the east side of the village of Alton. The highway reaches its terminus at the intersection of Lanes Mill Road and Clifton Road at Ninevah.

== KY 327 ==
Kentucky Route 327
- Location: Saint Mary–Saint Charles
- Length: 1.639 mi (2.638 km)

Kentucky Route 327 is a 1.639-mile-long (2.638 km) rural secondary highway in central Marion County. The highway begins at KY 84 (Saint Mary's Road) at Saint Mary. KY 327 meets the south end of KY 2740 (Frogtown Road), passes through Saint Charles, and crosses Hardins Creek and Cissels Creek at their confluence just south of the route's northern terminus at KY 49 (Loretto Road).

== KY 328 ==
Kentucky Route 328
- Location: Eubank–Quail
- Length: 21.956 mi (35.335 km)

Kentucky Route 328 is a 21.956-mile-long (35.335 km) rural secondary highway in southern Lincoln County, northern Pulaski County, and western Rockcastle County. The highway extends from KY 70 near Eubank east to KY 618 at Quail. KY 328 heads west from KY 70 then turns north shortly before its bridge across Pilot Creek. The highway continues north to Waynesburg, where the route has a grade crossing of Norfolk Southern Railway's Louisville District rail line. Immediately to the east of the railroad, KY 3276 (Old Waynesburg Road) splits southeast while KY 328 continues east toward US 27. KY 328 intersects and begins to run concurrently with KY 1247 just west of their intersection with US 27, which both routes join heading south. KY 1247 splits from US 27 acutely shortly before KY 328 does; the latter diverges at an orthogonal intersection whose west leg is the east end of KY 3276. KY 328 immediately has a short concurrency with KY 1247—the former route follows the north–south axis of the latter—then continues east and crosses Caney Creek. KY 328 continues into Pulaski County, where the route crosses Buck Creek and meets the north end of KY 865. At Bee Lick, the highway turns north and runs concurrently with KY 39 to cross a tributary of Bee Lick Creek. KY 328 diverges from KY 39 at the Lincoln–Pulaski–Rockcastle county tripoint. In Rockcastle County, the highway follows Bee Lick Road, which crosses Bee Lick Creek and meets the west end of KY 3273 (West Level Green Road). KY 328 crosses Brushy Creek before reaching its eastern terminus at KY 618 (Quail Road) at Quail.

== KY 332 ==
Kentucky Route 332
- Location: Bardstown
- Length: 3.115 mi (5.013 km)

Kentucky Route 332 is a 3.115-mile-long (5.013 km) rural secondary highway in central Nelson County. The highway begins at KY 245 (New Shepherdsville Road) at the northwest city limit of Bardstown. KY 332 heads north and then southeast along Nazareth Road. The highway curves east through a grade crossing of an R.J. Corman Railroad Group rail line and follows the north city limit of Bardstown to its eastern terminus at US 31E and US 150 (Louisville Road).

== KY 333 ==
Kentucky Route 333
- Location: Webster–Hog Wallow
- Length: 22.653 mi (36.456 km)

Kentucky Route 333 is a 22.653-mile-long (36.456 km) rural secondary highway in eastern Breckinridge County and southern Meade County. The highway begins at KY 2780 (Webster–Clifton Mills Road) in the village of Webster. KY 333 heads south along Webster–Basin Springs Road to US 60 and KY 79, with which KY 333 briefly runs concurrently. KY 333 splits southeast and meets the south ends of KY 2202 (Luney Road) and KY 2781 (Thornhill Road) between Basin Spring and Bewleyville. At KY 1238 in Bewleyville, KY 333 turns south toward Corners, where the route turns east at the KY 690 intersection. The highway meets the north end of KY 2199 at Big Spring at the Breckinridge–Meade–Hardin county tripoint. KY 333 briefly follows the Meade–Hardin county line, where the route meets the west end of KY 220 where the routes curves north fully into Meade County. The highway follows Big Spring Road north and meets the west end of KY 1600 (St. Martins Road) at Maples Corner. KY 333 meets the east end of KY 1735 (Ballman Road), the west end of KY 1158 (Bee Knob Hill Road), and the east end of KY 656 (Blackjack Road) before reaching its eastern terminus at KY 313 south of Hog Wallow.

== KY 334 ==
Kentucky Route 334
- Location: Maceo–Hawesville
- Length: 21.352 mi (34.363 km)

Kentucky Route 334 is a 21.532-mile-long (34.652 km) supplemental road in northeastern Daviess County and along the Ohio River in Hancock County. The highway begins at US 60 north of Maceo. KY 334 heads south and meets the east end of KY 2830, then the route turns east and follows the CSX rail line under US 60. The highway crosses Little Blackford Creek twice before crossing Blackford Creek into Hancock County. KY 334 heads east into the city of Lewisport on Pell Street. The highway meets the north end of KY 657 (Fourth Street) and turns north onto Fourth Street for one block before turning east onto Market Street to head out of the city. KY 334 heads northeast, crossing Yellow Creek and meeting the north end of KY 1605 before curving southeast at its crossing of Muddy Gut Creek. The highway meets the north end of KY 3092 and intersects KY 3543 east of Petrie. After crossing a pair of railroad spurs serving riverfront factories, KY 334 turns east toward the Ohio River and turns south to run along the riverfront. The highway enters the city of Hawesville at its grade crossing of the CSX rail line, crosses Lead Creek and follows Main Street to its terminus at KY 3101, which heads west on Harrison Street and south on Main Street.

== KY 335 ==
Kentucky Route 335
- Location: Cave City–Rowletts
- Length: 9.161 mi (14.743 km)

Kentucky Route 335 is a 9.161-mile-long (14.743 km) rural secondary highway in northern Barren County and southern Hart County. The highway begins at US 31W (Dixie Highway) in the city of Cave City. KY 335 heads north along Old Horse Cave Road, which changes to Old Dixie Highway at the north city limit, where the highway enters Hart County. The highway continues along the west city limit of Horse Cave and intersects a CSX rail line at an oblique angle. The highway fully enters the city shortly before the route meets KY 218 (Main Street); the two highways run concurrently out of Horse Cave. KY 335 diverges from KY 218 onto L and N Turnpike Road just east of KY 218's interchange with I-65. The highway passes Kentucky Down Under and continues northeast to the village of Rowletts, where the route crosses over the CSX rail line shortly before its northern terminus at US 31W (Dixie Highway).

== KY 336 ==
Kentucky Route 336
- Location: Earlington–Madisonville
- Length: 6.144 mi (9.888 km)

Kentucky Route 336 is a 6.144-mile-long (9.888 km) supplemental road in central Hopkins County. The highway begins at US 41 (Hopkinsville Road) in the city of Earlington. KY 336 heads northeast along Wilson Avenue, which becomes North Sandcut Road where the highway curves east. At the north city limit of Earlington, the highway arrives at a four-way intersection with KY 2171 (Hubert Reid Road) and KY 481 (Sandcut Road); KY 336 joins KY 2171 heading east. The two highways cross over a CSX rail line as they approach I-69 (Pennyrile Parkway). Before KY 2171 passes under I-69, KY 336 splits north onto Grapevine Road, which intersects the interchange ramps to and from southbound I-69. The highway intersects the CSX rail line and curves west. KY 336 intersects KY 481, which heads south as Sandcut Road and north as Grapevine Road, then the route follows McLeod Lane west to its terminus at US 41 (Hopkinsville Road) at the south end of the city of Madisonville.

== KY 337 ==
Kentucky Route 337
- Location: Mannsville–Gravel Switch
- Length: 20.478 mi (32.956 km)

Kentucky Route 337 is a 20.478-mile-long (32.956 km) rural secondary highway in eastern Taylor County and eastern Marion County. The highway begins at KY 70 (Liberty Road) in Mannsville. KY 337 heads north along Bradfordsville Road, which meets the east end of KY 744 (Spurlington Road) and crosses Black Lick Creek and Tallow Creek. North of Tallow Creek, the highway ascends out of stream valleys and crosses a ridge into Marion County. KY 337 continues as Mannsville Road, which crosses Cabin Branch before reaching KY 49 (Bradfordsville Road). The two routes run concurrently east across Big South Fork at its confluence with Rolling Fork and enter the city of Bradfordsville along Main Street. In the center of town, KY 49 splits south onto Liberty Road and KY 337 continues on Main Street. The highway follows Bradfordsville–Gravel Switch Road northeast through the valley of Rolling Fork, where the route crosses Jones Creek and Buffalo Creek. KY 337 veers away from the river valley after crossing Rolling Fork and heads north to its terminus at KY 243 at Gravel Switch.

== KY 340 ==
Kentucky Route 340
- Location: Huldeville–Neafus
- Length: 13.025 mi (20.962 km)

Kentucky Route 340 is a 13.025-mile-long (20.962 km) rural secondary highway in northern Butler County. The highway begins at KY 70 (Brownsville Road) at Huldeville. KY 340 heads northeast on Brooklyn Road, which crosses New Zion Creek on its way to Brooklyn. The highway continues northwest to KY 79 (Caneyville Road), with which the route runs concurrently east. KY 340 splits north onto Oak Ridge Road, which crosses the East Prong of Indian Camp Creek between Casey and Oak Ridge. The highway makes a sharp curve west at Neafus Road and takes that name as it heads west and then north. KY 340 crosses over the Western Kentucky Parkway shortly before reaching its northern terminus at Neafus Road at Neafus at the Butler–Grayson–Ohio county tripoint.

=== History ===
KY 340 was formed between 1945 and 1950.

The original KY 340 ran from KY 339 in Lowes to US 45 (now KY 1241) in Folsomdale. This was removed by 1945, and is now part of KY 849.

== KY 341 ==
Kentucky Route 341
- Location: Midway
- Length: 2.419 mi (3.893 km)

Kentucky Route 341 is a 2.419-mile-long (3.893 km) rural secondary highway in northern Woodford County and southern Scott County. The highway begins at US 62 and US 421 (Leestown Pike) in the city of Midway. KY 341 heads north along Georgetown Road, which immediately has a diamond interchange with I-64. The highway continues north to its terminus at KY 1973. The road was extended north from the Woodford-Scott county line to KY 1973 on July 13, 2021.

== KY 342 ==
Kentucky Route 342
- Location: Burgin–Shakertown
- Length: 4.623 mi (7.440 km)

Kentucky Route 342 is a 4.623-mile-long (7.440 km) rural secondary highway in eastern Mercer County. The highway begins at KY 33 (Pleasant Hill Drive) in the city of Burgin. KY 342 follows Curdsville Road northeast out of town. The highway passes under and later crosses over a Norfolk Southern Railway line twice on its way to the E. W. Brown Generating Station, which includes the Dix Dam on the Dix River to the east. Next to the power plant property, KY 342 intersects a rail line serving the facility, and its name changes to Dix Dam Road. KY 342 veers west to pass under the mainline railroad for the last time. The highway crosses Cedar Run before reaching its terminus at KY 33 (Shakertown Road) south of Shakertown.

== KY 345 ==
Kentucky Route 345
- Location: Garrettsburg–Church Hill
- Length: 12.482 mi (20.088 km)

Kentucky Route 345 is a 12.482-mile-long (20.088 km) rural secondary highway in southern Christian County. The highway begins at a barrier at the limits of the Fort Campbell south of the hamlet of Garrettsburg. KY 345 heads north along Palmyra Road, which intersects KY 117 (Herndon–Oak Grove Road) north of Howels. The highway meets KY 107 (Lafayette Road) just south of I-24; the two highways run concurrently north across the Interstate Highway with no access and pass by the hamlet of Beverly and by Swallow Spring Pond. KY 345 splits from KY 107 into Huffman Mill Road, which crosses the Little River before reaching its northern terminus at KY 695 (Cox Mill Road) at Church Hill.

== KY 346 ==
Kentucky Route 346
- Location: Guthrie
- Length: 0.868 mi (1,397 m)

Kentucky Route 346 is a 0.868-mile-long (1.397 km) rural secondary highway in southern Todd County. The highway begins at the intersection of Ewing Street and Park Street in the city of Guthrie; US 41 heads south toward Tennessee on Ewing Street and west on Park Street, and KY 346 heads north on Ewing Street. The highway crosses Spring Creek as it leaves the city of Guthrie, north of which the route reaches its northern terminus at US 79 (Russellville Road).

== KY 347 ==
Kentucky Route 347
- Location: Limp
- Length: 2.543 mi (4.093 km)

Kentucky Route 347 is a 2.543-mile-long (4.093 km) supplemental road in western Hardin County. The highway begins at KY 920 (Salt River Road) at Limp. KY 347 heads southeast on Solway Meeting Road to its terminus at Dry Ridge Road; Solway Meeting Road continues south as a county highway.

== KY 349 ==
Kentucky Route 349
- Location: White Plains
- Existed: 1995

Kentucky Route 349 was a former highway in Hopkins County. It ran from US 62 south and west via Franklin Street and Railroad Street to KY 813. The road was given to the city of White Plains on January 24, 1995.

== KY 350 ==
Kentucky Route 350
- Location: Albany–Cartwright
- Length: 7.294 mi (11.739 km)

Kentucky Route 350 is a 7.294-mile-long (11.739 km) rural secondary highway in central Clinton County. The highway begins around the Clinton County Courthouse in the center of the city of Albany and was once the main route to the Wayne County seat of Monticello. The block containing the courthouse is bordered by a pair of one-way pairs: US 127 Bus. follows Washington Street north and Cross Street south, and KY 350 follows Cumberland Street west and Jefferson Street east. Eastbound KY 350 runs concurrently with northbound US 127 Bus. for one block. These one-way sections are not signed. The two-way main part of KY 350 begins at the intersection of Cumberland Street and Washington Street. The highway heads east out of the city as Old Momnticello Road and curves northeast through an intersection with KY 415 into the valley of Smith Creek. KY 350 heads north out of the valley to its northern terminus at KY 90 at Cartwright.

== KY 352 ==
Kentucky Route 352
- Location: Oakland–Stonewall
- Length: 3.253 mi (5.235 km)

Kentucky Route 352 is a 3.253-mile-long (5.235 km) supplemental road in southern Bracken County. The highway begins at Panina Pike south of Oakland. KY 352 follows Garrison Road east to its terminus at KY 875 (Bridgeville Road) at Stonewall.

=== History ===
KY 352 was formed ca. 1951.

The original KY 352 ran from Middle Creek Road in Eagle Mills east to KY 84 near Hodgenville; This became part of KY 222 when it was extended east from US 31W.

== KY 356 ==
Kentucky Route 356
- Location: Stonewall–Cynthiana
- Length: 17.135 mi (27.576 km)

Kentucky Route 356 is a 17.135-mile-long (27.576 km) rural secondary highway in northern Scott County and western Harrison County. The highway begins at US 25 (Cincinnati Pike) at Stonewall. KY 356 heads east along Stone Lane, which intersects a Norfolk Southern Railway line before crossing the Scott–Harrison county line. The highway continues alone White Oak Road, which crosses the middle and south forks of Raven Creek and the north and south forks of Twin Creek. East of the last stream, KY 356 runs concurrently with KY 1842 between Hawktown Road and White Oak–Tricum Pike and meets the north end of KY 3018 (Mill Creek Road). The highway crosses Mill Creek and intersects US 27, which bypasses Cynthiana to the west, shortly before entering the city. KY 356 enters the city along Pleasant Street and reaches its eastern terminus as the west leg of a five-legged intersection on the west side of the South Fork of the Licking River. From the intersection, city-maintained White Oak Pike heads northwest, KY 3016 heads south on River Road, KY 36 heads north on River Road, and KY 36 heads east across the river on Pleasant Street into downtown Cynthiana.

== KY 362 ==
Kentucky Route 362
- Location: Pewee Valley–Raymond Hill
- Length: 15.164 mi (24.404 km)

Kentucky Route 362 is a 15.164-mile-long (24.404 km) rural secondary highway in western Oldham County and northern Shelby County. The highway begins at KY 22 (Ballardsville Road) on the northern edge of the city of Pewee Valley. KY 362 heads southeast through the city along Central Avenue, which has three pairs of right-angle turns. At the second pair of turns, the highway parallels the CSX rail line before crossing the railroad at grade to KY 146 (La Grange Road), with which the route runs concurrently briefly before turning southeast onto Ash Avenue to head out of town. East of the city, KY 362 bridges Flat Rock Creek and crosses Floyds Fork into Shelby County. The highway runs parallel to the Shelby–Jefferson county line, passing the Kentucky Correctional Institute for Women, to the northern terminus of KY 1531 (Aiken Road), where KY 362 continues on Aiken Road. The highway meets the south end of KY 1408 (Floydsburg Road), crosses Junkins Run, and meets the north end of KY 1848 (Todds Point Road) at Todds Point. KY 362 meets the south end of KY 1315 (Hanna Road) at Fibles Run and crosses Lutz Run and Bullskin Creek before reaching its eastern terminus at KY 53 (La Grange Road) at Raymond Hill.

== KY 364 ==
Kentucky Route 364
- Location: Maggard–Cottle
- Length: 12.832 mi (20.651 km)

Kentucky Route 364 is a 12.832-mile-long (20.651 km) rural secondary highway in northern Magoffin County and eastern Morgan County. The highway begins at KY 1081 (Raccoon Creek Road) near Maggard. KY 364 heads north on Improvement Fork Road along the namesake stream to Plutarch, where the highway leaves the stream valley and passes over a summit to the valley of Rockhouse Creek, where the route's name becomes Rockhouse Creek Road. The highway follows that creek through Logville into Morgan County. At Matthew, KY 364 meets the north end of KY 3333 (Pricey Creek Road) and follows the valley of Licking River downstream. The highway crosses Lacy Creek before reaching its northern terminus at US 460 and KY 7 at Cottle.

== KY 365 ==
Kentucky Route 365
- Location: Mattoon–Sturgis
- Length: 10.130 mi (16.303 km)

Kentucky Route 365 is a 10.130-mile-long (16.303 km) rural secondary highway in northern Crittenden County and southern Union County. The highway begins at US 60 north of Mattoon. KY 365 heads north along a low ridge between the headwaters of several creeks. The highway runs along the edge of Big Rivers Wildlife Management Area before curving east and crossing the Tradewater River into Union County. KY 365 curves north and enters the city of Sturgis, where the route follows Monroe Street. The highway intersects KY 923 (Old Providence Road) before reaching its northern terminus at US 60 and KY 109 (Fifth Street) in the center of town.

== KY 366 ==
Kentucky Route 366
- Location: Fedscreek
- Length: 4.365 mi (7.025 km)

Kentucky Route 366 is a 4.365-mile-long (7.025 km) rural secondary highway in eastern Pike County. The highway begins at KY 1499 at Fedscreek. KY 366 heads east on Feds Creek Road, which crosses Levisa Fork, intersects a CSX rail line, and follows the valley of Feds Creek. The highway reaches its eastern terminus at the junction of Jones Fork Road and Dicks Fork Road at the confluence of the eponymous streams to form Feds Creek.

== KY 367 ==
Kentucky Route 367
- Location: Elizaville–Nepton
- Length: 3.484 mi (5.607 km)

Kentucky Route 367 is a 3.484-mile-long (5.607 km) supplemental road in northern Fleming County. The highway begins at KY 170 (Junction Road) north of Elizaville. KY 367 follows Nepton Road along Mud Lick Creek to the village of Nepton, where the route crosses Johnson Creek and intersects the Transkentucky Transportation Railroad. North of Nepton, the highway meets the south end of KY 888 (Buffalo Trace Road) before reaching its northern terminus at the Fleming–Mason county line.

== KY 368 ==
Kentucky Route 368
- Location: Stamping Ground–Monterey
- Length: 12.390 mi (19.940 km)

Kentucky Route 368 is a 12.390-mile-long (19.940 km) rural secondary highway in western Scott County, northeastern Franklin County, and southern Owen County. The highway begins at KY 227 (Owenton Road) north of Stamping Ground. KY 368 heads northwest along Cedar Road, which immediately crosses LeCompte Creek. The highway enters Franklin County and enters the valley of Cedar Creek south of Elmville, where the route meets the east end of KY 1707 (Camp Pleasant Road) and crosses Oakland Branch. KY 368 continues northwest into Owen County along Cedar Creek Road, which crosses Elm Fork near the county line and Cedar Creek at Truesville. The highway heads west from Truesville and crosses Kays Branch and Morgadore Branch. At the latter crossing, KY 368 leaves the valley of Cedar Creek and ascends to its terminus at US 127 south of Monterey.

KY 368 was first proposed in 1944, when a group of citizens, led by local preacher I.W. Manley, requested a highway be built from then-US 227 and KY 355, in order to create a shorter route to Worthville. Specifically, they petitioned for a 4.7-mile-long (7.6 km) section between Truesville and Elmville. The road was built and designated by 1953.

== KY 369 ==
Kentucky Route 369
- Location: Rochester–Beaver Dam
- Length: 13.796 mi (22.203 km)

Kentucky Route 369 is a 13.796-mile-long (22.203 km) rural secondary highway in western Butler County and southern Ohio County. The highway begins at KY 70 (Rochester Road) in the city of Rochester. KY 369 heads north along Russellville Street and intersects KY 1117 (Provo Road). In the center of town, the highway turns east onto Main Street and then north onto Ferry Street, which leads to a toll ferry across the Green River into Ohio County. KY 369 continues along Rochester Road, which passes through a section of Peabody Wildlife Management Area and the hamlet of Cool Springs. The highway crosses Lewis Creek just south of its underpass of the Western Kentucky Parkway; just north of the parkway, the route meets the east end of a frontage road, KY 2714. KY 369 continues through another unit of the wildlife management area before entering the city of Beaver Dam and reaching its northern terminus at US 231 (Main Street).

== KY 370 ==
Kentucky Route 370
- Location: Jewell City–Sebree
- Length: 12.267 mi (19.742 km)

Kentucky Route 370 is a 12.267-mile-long (19.742 km) rural secondary highway in northern Hopkins County and eastern Webster County. The highway begins in Jewell City at KY 138 (Jewell City Road) at the west end of KY 138's bridge across the Pond River at the Hopkins–McLean county line, just south of where that river flows into the Green River. KY 370 heads northwest along Onton Road through Ashbyburg and west through a junction with KY 2347 (Weldon Road) to the Hopkins–Webster county line just east of Pitman Creek. The highway has a pair of right-angle turns in the village of Onton, the latter with the east end of KY 147. KY 370 continues northwest, crosses over Deer Creek, and passes under I-69 (Pennyrile Parkway). The highway enters the city of Sebree on Main Street and reaches its northern terminus at College Street, which carries US 41 in both directions and KY 56 to the north; KY 56 also follows Main Street west from US 41.

== KY 372 ==
Kentucky Route 372
- Location: Atchison–Campbellsville
- Length: 3.508 mi (5.646 km)

Kentucky Route 372 is a 3.508-mile-long (5.646 km) rural secondary highway in eastern Taylor County. The highway begins at the U.S. Army Corps of Engineers boundary on Smith Ridge Road south of Atchison; the road continues to a boat ramp on Green River Lake. KY 372 heads north through Atchison to the east city limit of Campbellsville at an intersection with KY 70, which heads into town as Central Avenue and away from town along Elkhorn Road.

== KY 373 ==
Kentucky Route 373
- Location: Kuttawa
- Length: 3.623 mi (5.831 km)

Kentucky Route 373 is a 3.263-mile-long (5.251 km) rural secondary highway in northern Lyon County. The highway begins at US 62, US 641, and KY 93 on the northern edge of the city of Kuttawa. KY 373 heads north through the northwestern edge of the city of Eddyville, which the route leaves where it crosses Crab Creek and intersects the Paducah & Louisville Railway. The highway continues north to its terminus at KY 1943.

== KY 374 ==
Kentucky Route 374
- Location: Speedwell–Union City
- Length: 10.399 mi (16.736 km)

Kentucky Route 374 is a 10.399-mile-long (16.736 km) rural secondary highway in eastern Madison County. The highway begins at KY 499 (Brassfield Road) at Speedwell. KY 374 heads north along Speedwell Road, which follows the eastern edge of Blue Grass Army Depot. The highway crosses Muddy Creek on its way to Moberly, where the route joins KY 52 (Irvine Road) to head west along the north edge of the military installation. KY 374 diverges from KY 52 opposite an entrance to the army depot near Reeds Crossing. The highway follows Chuck Norris Road to its northern terminus at KY 1986 (Doylesville Road) at Union City.

=== History ===
KY 374 was formed by 1950.

The original KY 374 ran from KY 11 in Weedonia to KY 57 in Mt. Carmel; this became part of KY 24, and is now Mill Creek Road (old KY 2509), KY 597 (old KY 673), Mt. Gilead Road and Poplar Grove Road (both old KY 597).

== KY 378 ==
Kentucky Route 378
- Location: Sewell–Hendricks
- Length: 20.613 mi (33.173 km)

Kentucky Route 378 is a 20.613-mile-long (33.173 km) rural secondary highway in northern Breathitt County and southern Magoffin County. The highway begins at KY 1812 south of Sewell. KY 378 heads northeast through the valley of Frozen Creek, where the highway meets the south end of KY 394 at the mouth of Davis Creek between Sewell and Taulbee. The highway continues through Rock Lick and Mountain Valley to the headwaters of Frozen Creek. KY 378 ascends from the valley and meets KY 1094 near the Breathitt–Magoffin–Wolfe county tripoint. The two highways run concurrently southeast along the Breathitt–Magoffin county line before KY 1094 splits fully into Breathitt County and KY 378 into Magoffin County. KY 378 descends to the valley of the Right Fork of the Licking River and passes through Seitz and Fritz, where the route meets the south end of KY 3337. The highway leaves the Right Fork valley and descends into the valley of the Middle Fork of the Licking River, where the route reaches its eastern terminus at KY 30 south of Hendricks.

== KY 381 ==
Kentucky Route 381
- Location: Fairbanks–Sedalia
- Length: 10.472 mi (16.853 km)

Kentucky Route 381 is a 10.472-mile-long (16.853 km) rural secondary highway in southern Graves County. The highway begins at the Tennessee state line south of Fairbanks; the road continues south as Tennessee State Route 89. KY 381 passes through Fairbanks and crosses Caldwell Creek on its way to Lynnville, where the route intersects KY 94. North of Lynnville, the highway intersects KY 83. The route crosses Bacon Creek before reaching its northern terminus at a four-way intersection in Sedalia. KY 97 heads north from the intersection, KY 339 heads west from the intersection, and both routes run concurrently east out of Sedalia.

== KY 382 ==
Kentucky Route 382
- Location: Gamaliel–Bugtussle
- Length: 6.187 mi (9.957 km)
- Existed: 2022–present

Kentucky Route 382 is a rural secondary highway that runs 6.187 miles (9.957 km) from KY 63 at Gamaliel west to the Tennessee state line at Bugtussle. It begins as Main Street in the city of Gamaliel in southern Monroe County. Main Street continues on northbound KY 63; southbound KY 63 follows Red Boiling Springs Road. KY 382 meets the north end of KY 2164 (Holland Street) and the south end of KY 792 (Stanford Street) before leaving the city along Bugtussle Road. The highway crosses Line Creek and Cane Creek on its way southwest to the Tennessee state line at Bugtussle; where the road continues as Tennessee State Route 261. This road was renumbered from a detached portion of KY 87 on December 16, 2022.

The original KY 382 ran from US 25E south of Pineville southwest via Asher-Clear Creek Road and Pine Mountain State Park Road to KY 1491 in Bell County. This was removed from the state highway system by 1977.

== KY 384 ==
Kentucky Route 384
- Location: Dublin–Mayfield
- Length: 5.616 mi (9.038 km)

Kentucky Route 384 is a 5.616-mile-long (9.038 km) rural secondary highway in western Graves County. The highway begins at a four-way intersection; KY 339 heads south from the junction, KY 1748 heads east, and both highways run concurrently west toward Dublin. KY 384 heads north and then curves east. The highway crosses McClane Creek on its way to its eastern terminus at KY 80 west of Mayfield.

== KY 385 ==
Kentucky Route 385
- Location: Cuba
- Length: 5.801 mi (9.336 km)

Kentucky Route 385 is a 5.801-mile-long (9.336 km) rural secondary highway south of Cuba in southern Graves County. The highway begins at KY 303 north of the Tennessee state line. KY 385 heads north toward KY 94, runs concurrently west with that route, then splits north toward its northern terminus at KY 2422.

== KY 386 ==
Kentucky Route 386
- Location: Carlisle
- Length: 5.414 mi (8.713 km)

Kentucky Route 386 is a 5.414-mile-long (8.713 km) rural secondary highway in western Nicholas County. The highway begins at KY 13 (Lower Jackstown Road) south of Carlisle. KY 386 heads northwest parallel to the South Fork of the Licking River, which forms the Nicholas–Bourbon county line. The highway crosses McBride Run and Big Brushy Creek on its course northwest. KY 386 intersects the Transkentucky Transportation Railroad just south of its northern terminus at US 68 (Maysville Road) west of Carlisle.

== KY 387 ==
Kentucky Route 387
- Location: Northern Crittenden County
- Length: 3.787 mi (6.095 km)

Kentucky Route 387 is a 3.787-mile-long (6.095 km) supplemental road in northern Crittenden County. The highway begins at KY 91 between Marion and the Ohio River. KY 387 heads northeast and crosses Crooked Creek as the route approaches the Ohio River from an angle. The highway reaches its northern terminus at a boat ramp at the river at the former site of Dam 50.

== KY 391 ==
Kentucky Route 391
- Location: Vine Grove
- Length: 2.872 mi (4.622 km)

Kentucky Route 391 is a 2.872-mile-long (4.622 km) rural secondary highway in northern Hardin County. The highway begins at KY 1600 (Rineyville Road) south of Vine Grove. KY 391 heads northeast along Crume Road, which enters the city of Vine Grove and crosses Otter Creek. South of downtown Vine Grove, the highway turns north onto High Street. KY 391 turns east onto Brown Street and north onto Church Street to reach its northern terminus at KY 144 (Main Street) within the Vine Grove Historic District.

=== History ===
KY 391 was formed in 1950.

The original KY 391 ran from US 150 in Crab Orchard to KY 80 in Somerset; this became part of KY 80 when it was extended south.

== KY 392 ==
Kentucky Route 392
- Location: Cynthiana–Barefoot
- Length: 12.035 mi (19.368 km)

Kentucky Route 392 is a 12.035-mile-long (19.368 km) rural secondary highway in eastern Harrison County and northwestern Nicholas County. The highway begins at US 62 (Oddville Avenue) on the eastern edge of the city of Cynthiana. KY 392 heads east along Republican Pike, which crosses the South Branch of Indian Creek and Indian Creek itself. The highway continues northeast through Buena Vista and crosses Beaver Creek. KY 392 crosses the Harrison–Nicholas county line and follows Crooked Creek Road along Crooked Creek to its eastern terminus at KY 1244, which heads east along Sugar Creek Road and south along Crooked Creek Road toward Barefoot.

=== History ===
KY 392 was formed in 1955; the original route of KY 392 is unknown.

== KY 394 ==
Kentucky Route 394
- Location: Moct
- Length: 2.315 mi (3.726 km)

Kentucky Route 394 is a 2.315-mile-long (3.726 km) supplemental road in northern Breathitt County. The highway begins at KY 378 (Frozen Creek Road) in the valley of Frozen Creek between Sewell and Taulbee. KY 394 heads north along Davis Creek; the highway continues to the hamlet of Moct, beyond which the road ends near the headwaters of Davis Creek near the Breathitt–Wolfe county line.

=== History ===
KY 394 was formed by 1954.

The original KY 394 ran from US 227 (now KY 227) to General Butler State Resort Park; this is now General Butler Park Road.

== KY 396 ==
Kentucky Route 396
- Location: Carter–Eby
- Length: 4.316 mi (6.946 km)

Kentucky Route 396 is a 4.316-mile-long (6.946 km) rural secondary highway in northern Carter County. The highway begins at KY 2 west of Carter. The highway heads northwest along Brushy Creek to the creek's headwaters, where the route ascends to its terminus at KY 474 at the Carter–Lewis county line north of Eby.

KY 396 was formed in 1951; the original route of KY 396 is unknown.

== KY 397 ==
Kentucky Route 397
- Location: Haddix
- Length: 3.543 mi (5.702 km)

Kentucky Route 397 is a 3.543-mile-long (5.702 km) rural secondary highway in southern Breathitt County. The highway begins at KY 1110 in the valley of the North Fork Kentucky River west of Haddix. KY 397 heads northwest out of the valley along Markham Creek Road, which descends into the valley of the namesake creek. Beyond Markham Creek's confluence with Cane Creek, the highway follows Cane Creek north to its terminus at KY 30 south of Jackson.

KY 397 was formed in 1955; the original route of KY 397 is unknown.

== KY 398 ==
Kentucky Route 398
- Location: Bainbridge–Pennyrile State Forest
- Length: 8.354 mi (13.444 km)

Kentucky Route 398 is a 8.354-mile-long (13.444 km) rural secondary highway in northwestern Christian County. The highway begins at KY 91 (Princeton Road) at Bainbridge. KY 398 heads north along Bainbridge Road, which passes through Hawkins before entering Pennyrile State Forest. The highway meets the west end of KY 1348 (State Park Road) and passes by Pennyrile Forest State Resort Park. North of the state park, KY 398 veers east toward its northern terminus at KY 109 (Dawson Springs Road).
