= Kentucky Route 658 =

State highway in Kentucky, United States

Kentucky Route 658
- KY 658 highlighted in red

Route information
- Maintained by KYTC
- Length: 2.891 mi (4.653 km)
- Existed: 1987–present

Major junctions
- West end: US 68 / Cherokee Drive in Campbellsville
- East end: KY 1799 near Arista

Location
- Country: United States
- State: Kentucky
- Counties: Taylor

Highway system
- Kentucky State Highway System; Interstate; US; State; Parkways
← KY 657	→ KY 659

Kentucky Route 658 (KY 658) is a 2.891-mile-long (4.653 km) state highway in central Taylor County, Kentucky, that runs from U.S. Route 68 (US 68) and Cherokee Drive in northeastern Campbellsville to KY 1799 south of Arista.

== Major intersections ==
The entire route is in Taylor County.

Location	mi	km	Destinations	Notes
Campbellsville	0.000	0.000	US 68 (East Broadway Street) / Cherokee Drive	Western terminus; continues as Cherokee Drive beyond US 68
	0.665	1.070	KY 3518 south (Watertown Bypass)	Northern terminus of KY 3518
	1.516	2.440	KY 2222 north (Airport Road)	Southern terminus of KY 2222
	2.891	4.653	KY 1799 (Reid's Chapel Road)	Eastern terminus
1.000 mi = 1.609 km; 1.000 km = 0.621 mi
