= Kentucky Route 788 =

State highway in Kentucky

Kentucky Route 788
- Gate 7 Road
- KY 788 highlighted in red

Route information
- Maintained by KYTC
- Length: 1.111 mi (1.788 km)
- Existed: June 20, 2012–present

Major junctions
- East end: US 41A at Fort Campbell
- West end: Fort Campbell Gate 7

Location
- Country: United States
- State: Kentucky
- Counties: Christian

Highway system
- Kentucky State Highway System; Interstate; US; State; Parkways
← KY 787	→ KY 789

Kentucky Route 788 (KY 788) is a 1.101-mile-long (1.772 km) state highway in southern Christian County in the U.S. state of Kentucky. It begins at U.S. Route 41A (US 41A) and heads west along Gate 7 Road. The highway reaches the end of state maintenance at the Fort Campbell.

== Major intersections ==
The entire route is in Fort Campbell, Christian County.

mi	km	Destinations	Notes
0.000	0.000	Fort Campbell Gate 7	
1.111	1.788	US 41 Alt. to I-24 – Clarksville	
1.000 mi = 1.609 km; 1.000 km = 0.621 mi
