= Moct, Kentucky =

Unincorporated community in Kentucky, United States

Moct
- Unincorporated community
- Location within the state of Kentucky Moct (the United States)
- Coordinates: 37°39′41″N 83°20′45″W
- Country: United States
- State: Kentucky
- County: Breathitt
- Elevation: 896 ft (273 m)
- Time zone: UTC-6 (Central (CST))
  - Summer (DST): UTC-5 (CST)
- GNIS feature ID: 508621

Moct is an unincorporated community in Breathitt County, Kentucky, United States.
