= Kentucky Route 817 =

State highway in Kentucky, United States

Kentucky Route 817
- KY 817 highlighted in red

Route information
- Maintained by KYTC
- Length: 0.460 mi (740 m)
- Existed: 1993–present

Major junctions
- South end: KY 70 in Liberty
- North end: US 127 in Liberty

Location
- Country: United States
- State: Kentucky
- Counties: Casey

Highway system
- Kentucky State Highway System; Interstate; US; State; Parkways
| ← KY 816 | → KY 818 |

Kentucky Route 817 (KY 817) is a state highway in the city of Liberty in Casey County, Kentucky. The highway runs 0.460 miles (0.740 km) from Kentucky Route 70 (KY 70) north to U.S. Route 127 (US 127). KY 817 was established in 1993.

== Route description ==
KY 817 is a connector between KY 70 (Middleburg Road) and US 127 (Wallace Wilkinson Boulevard) east of the Liberty Downtown Historic District. The highway has no intermediate intersections and includes a bridge over the Green River. The Kentucky Transportation Cabinet classifies KY 817 as a state secondary highway.

== History ==
The Kentucky Transportation Cabinet constructed the road and designated KY 817 a state secondary highway through a January 14, 1993, official order.

== Major intersections ==
The entire route is in Liberty, Casey County.

| mi | km | Destinations | Notes |
|---|---|---|---|
| 0.000 | 0.000 | KY 70 (Middleburg Road) | Southern terminus |
| 0.460 | 0.740 | US 127 (Wallace Wilkinson Boulevard) | Northern terminus |
1.000 mi = 1.609 km; 1.000 km = 0.621 mi
