= Neafus, Kentucky =

Neafus
- Unincorporated community
- Location within the state of Kentucky Neafus (the United States)
- Coordinates: 37°23′42.18″N 86°36′42.95″W
- Country: United States
- State: Kentucky
- County: Butler
- Elevation: 630 ft (190 m)
- Time zone: UTC-6 (Central (CST))
  - Summer (DST): UTC-5 (CDT)
- Area codes: 270 and 364
- GNIS feature ID: 508089

Neafus is an unincorporated community located in northern Butler County in south-central Kentucky, United States.

== Geography ==
Neafus is located at the tripoint where Butler County's northern boundaries meet with the boundary between Ohio and Grayson Counties. The community also marks the northern terminus of Kentucky Route 340, which previously connected with US 62 west of Do Stop.

== Notable residents ==
Neafus is the birthplace of Medal of Honor recipient, PVT Wesley Phelps, USMC. PVT Phelps received the medal posthumously for actions on Peleliu during World War II.
