= Rowletts, Kentucky =

Unincorporated community in Kentucky, United States

- Unincorporated community
- Location within Kentucky Location within the United States
- Coordinates: 37°14′27″N 85°53′39″W
- Country: United States
- State: Kentucky
- County: Hart
- Elevation: 673 ft (205 m)
- Time zone: UTC-6 (Central (CST))
  - Summer (DST): UTC-5 (CDT)
- Area codes: 270 & 364
- GNIS feature ID: 495517

Rowletts is an unincorporated community in Hart County, Kentucky, in the United States.

== History ==
Rowletts was a station on the railroad. A post office called Rowlett's Depot was established in 1860, was renamed Rowletts in 1880, and remained in operation until it was discontinued in 1995. The community was named for John W. Rowlett, a railroad official.

== Geography ==
Rowletts is located along U.S. Route 31W at its junction with Kentucky Route 335 about 2 miles (3.2 km) south of Munfordville.
