= Mannsville, Kentucky =

Unincorporated community in Kentucky, United States

Mannsville
- Unincorporated community
- Location within the state of Kentucky Mannsville (the United States)
- Coordinates: 37°22′21″N 85°11′48″W
- Country: United States
- State: Kentucky
- County: Taylor
- Elevation: 738 ft (225 m)
- Time zone: UTC-5 (Eastern (EST))
  - Summer (DST): UTC-4 (EDT)
- ZIP codes: 42758
- GNIS feature ID: 497499

Mannsville is an unincorporated community in Taylor County, Kentucky, United States. First called "Manns Lick" for a salt lick discovered on the site by its pioneer settler, American Revolutionary War veteran Moses Mann (c1757-1849), the site is at the junction of Kentucky Routes 70 and 337, some 7 miles east of the county seat of Campbellsville. Its elevation is 738 feet (225 m). It has a post office with the ZIP code 42758.
