= Carter, Kentucky =

Unincorporated community in Kentucky, United States

- Unincorporated community
- Location within Kentucky Location within the United States
- Coordinates: 38°25′44″N 83°07′15″W
- Country: United States
- State: Kentucky
- County: Carter
- Elevation: 689 ft (210 m)
- Time zone: UTC-5 (Eastern (EST))
  - Summer (DST): UTC-4 (EDT)
- ZIP code: 41128
- Area code: 606
- GNIS feature ID: 488989

Carter is an unincorporated community in Carter County, Kentucky, United States. The community is located along Kentucky Route 2 11.5 miles (18.5 km) northwest of Grayson. Carter has a post office with ZIP code 41128.
