= Mattoon, Kentucky =

Unincorporated community in Kentucky, United States

Mattoon
- Unincorporated community
- Location within the state of Kentucky Mattoon (the United States)
- Coordinates: 37°24′12″N 88°1′23″W
- Country: United States
- State: Kentucky
- County: Crittenden
- Elevation: 512 ft (156 m)
- Time zone: UTC-5 (Eastern (EST))
  - Summer (DST): UTC-4 (EDT)
- GNIS feature ID: 513824

Mattoon is an unincorporated community in Crittenden County, Kentucky, United States.
