= Shoulderblade, Kentucky =

Unincorporated community in Kentucky, United States

Shoulderblade
- Unincorporated community
- Location within the state of Kentucky Shoulderblade (the United States)
- Coordinates: 37°29′50″N 83°28′2″W
- Country: United States
- State: Kentucky
- County: Breathitt
- Elevation: 748 ft (228 m)
- Demonym: Shoulderblader
- Time zone: UTC-5 (Eastern (EST))
  - Summer (DST): UTC-4 (EDT)
- GNIS feature ID: 515393

Shoulderblade is an unincorporated community located in Breathitt County, Kentucky, United States.

It is reportedly named after a creek, a tributary of the Middle Fork of the Kentucky River. The creek was in turn named for a bone of very large animal once discovered on its banks. The community is also referred to as Juan, named after the Battle of San Juan Hill.
