= Nepton, Kentucky =

Unincorporated community in Kentucky, United States

- Unincorporated community
- Location within the state of Kentucky
- Coordinates: 38°26′07″N 83°50′03″W
- Country: United States
- State: Kentucky
- County: Fleming
- Elevation: 846 ft (258 m)
- Time zone: UTC-5 (Eastern (EST))
  - Summer (DST): UTC-4 (EDT)
- ZIP code: 41039
- Area code: 606
- GNIS feature ID: 499265

Nepton is an unincorporated community in Fleming County, Kentucky, United States. A post office was built for the community in 1881, and closed in 1958.
