= Shady Grove, Kentucky =

Unincorporated community in Kentucky, United States

Shady Grove
- Unincorporated community
- Location within the state of Kentucky Shady Grove (the United States)
- Coordinates: 37°20′12″N 87°52′45″W
- Country: United States
- State: Kentucky
- County: Crittenden
- Elevation: 423 ft (129 m)
- Time zone: UTC-6 (Central (CST))
  - Summer (DST): UTC-5 (CDT)
- GNIS feature ID: 503209

Shady Grove is an unincorporated community in Crittenden County, Kentucky, United States.

== History ==
A post office was established at Shady Grove in 1852, and remained in operation until it was discontinued in 1950. In 1877, Shady Grove reportedly contained 2 churches, 3 stores, and 2 hotels.
