= Cottle, Kentucky =

Unincorporated community in Kentucky, United States

- Unincorporated community
- Location within Kentucky Location within the United States
- Coordinates: 37°53′20″N 83°12′14″W
- Country: United States
- State: Kentucky
- County: Morgan
- Elevation: 801 ft (244 m)
- Time zone: UTC-5 (Eastern (EST))
  - Summer (DST): UTC-4 (EDT)
- ZIP codes: 41412
- GNIS feature ID: 507766

Cottle is an unincorporated community in Morgan County, Kentucky, United States. It lies along U.S. Route 460 southeast of the city of West Liberty, the county seat of Morgan County. Its elevation is 801 feet (244 m).

A post office was established in the community in 1931, which was named for Joseph Cottle, an early settler.
