= Oscar, Kentucky =

Unincorporated community in Kentucky, United States

Oscar
- Unincorporated community
- Location within the state of Kentucky Oscar (the United States)
- Coordinates: 37°8′11″N 89°1′37″W
- Country: United States
- State: Kentucky
- County: Ballard
- Elevation: 364 ft (111 m)
- Time zone: UTC-6 (Central (CST))
  - Summer (DST): UTC-5 (CST)
- GNIS feature ID: 500013

Oscar is an unincorporated community located in Ballard County, Kentucky, United States. The community was named after Oscar Turner.
