= Forest Hills, Kentucky =

- City
- Location of Forest Hills in Jefferson County, Kentucky

- Location within the state of Kentucky Forest Hills (the United States)
- Coordinates: 38°12′57″N 85°35′00″W
- Country: United States
- State: Kentucky
- County: Jefferson

Area
  - Total: 0.29 sq mi (0.75 km^{2})
  - Land: 0.29 sq mi (0.75 km^{2})
  - Water: 0 sq mi (0.00 km^{2})
- Elevation: 659 ft (201 m)

Population (2020)
  - Total: 438
  - Density: 1,515.2/sq mi (585.02/km^{2})
- Time zone: UTC-5 (Eastern (EST))
  - Summer (DST): UTC-4 (EDT)
- ZIP Code: 41527
- FIPS code: 21-28342
- GNIS feature ID: 2403634
- Website: www.city-of-forest-hills.com

Forest Hills is a home rule-class city in Jefferson County, Kentucky, United States. It was formally incorporated by the state assembly in 1959. As of the 2020 census, Forest Hills had a population of 438.

== Geography ==
Forest Hills is located in eastern Jefferson County at 38°12′47″N 85°34′55″W (38.213169, -85.582062). It is bordered to the northwest by Hurstbourne Acres and on all other sides by Jeffersontown. Interstate 64 passes just north of the city border, with access from Exit 15 (Hurstbourne Parkway). I-64 leads west 11 miles (18 km) to downtown Louisville and east 40 miles (64 km) to Frankfort.

According to the United States Census Bureau, Forest Hills has a total area of 0.29 square miles (0.75 km^{2}), all land.

== Demographics ==
Historical population
Census	Pop.	Note	%±
1960	180		—
1970	469		160.6%
1980	502		7.0%
1990	454		−9.6%
2000	494		8.8%
2010	444		−10.1%
2020	438		−1.4%
U.S. Decennial Census

As of the census of 2000, there were 494 people, 195 households, and 147 families residing in the city. The population density was 1,560.5 inhabitants per square mile (602.5/km^{2}). There were 198 housing units at an average density of 625.5 per square mile (241.5/km^{2}). The racial makeup of the city was 95.95% White, 1.42% Black or African American, 2.02% Native American, 0.20% Asian, 0.20% from other races, and 0.20% from two or more races. Hispanic or Latino of any race were 1.01% of the population.

There were 195 households, out of which 29.2% had children under the age of 18 living with them, 65.1% were married couples living together, 8.7% had a female householder with no husband present, and 24.6% were non-families. 22.1% of all households were made up of individuals, and 15.9% had someone living alone who was 65 years of age or older. The average household size was 2.53 and the average family size was 2.95.

In the city, the population was spread out, with 22.9% under the age of 18, 5.5% from 18 to 24, 26.9% from 25 to 44, 22.3% from 45 to 64, and 22.5% who were 65 years of age or older. The median age was 42 years. For every 100 females, there were 90.0 males. For every 100 females age 18 and over, there were 89.6 males.

The median income for a household in the city was $65,500, and the median income for a family was $73,750. Males had a median income of $46,500 versus $32,750 for females. The per capita income for the city was $24,024. About 1.5% of families and 2.9% of the population were below the poverty line, including 3.5% of those under age 18 and 7.8% of those age 65 or over.
