= Fedscreek, Kentucky =

Unincorporated community in Kentucky, United States

Fedscreek
- Unincorporated community
- Location within the state of Kentucky Fedscreek (the United States)
- Coordinates: 37°24′12″N 82°14′43″W
- Country: United States
- State: Kentucky
- County: Pike
- Elevation: 883 ft (269 m)
- Time zone: UTC-5 (Eastern (EST))
  - Summer (DST): UTC-5 (EST)
- ZIP codes: 41524
- GNIS feature ID: 492016

Fedscreek is an unincorporated community and coal town in Pike County, Kentucky, United States.

A post office was established in the community in 1921. Fedscreek was named for nearby Feds Creek, which in turn was named for the obscure figure Fed.

== Climate ==
The climate in this area is characterized by hot, humid summers and generally mild to cool winters. According to the Köppen Climate Classification system, Fedscreek has a humid subtropical climate, abbreviated "Cfa" on climate maps.
