= Onton, Kentucky =

Census-designated place in Kentucky, United States

Onton
- Census-designated place (CDP)
- Location within the state of Kentucky
- Coordinates: 37°33′28″N 87°26′13″W
- Country: United States
- State: Kentucky
- County: Webster

Area
  - Total: 0.83 sq mi (2.15 km^{2})
  - Land: 0.83 sq mi (2.14 km^{2})
  - Water: 0.0039 sq mi (0.01 km^{2})
- Elevation: 476 ft (145 m)

Population (2020)
  - Total: 138
  - Density: 167.3/sq mi (64.58/km^{2})
- Time zone: UTC-6 (Central (CST))
  - Summer (DST): UTC-5 (CST)
- FIPS code: 21-58116
- GNIS feature ID: 2629659

Onton (/ˈɒntən/) is a census-designated place (CDP) in Webster County, Kentucky, United States. As of the 2020 census, Onton had a population of 138.

== Demographics ==
Historical population
Census	Pop.	Note	%±
2020	138		—
U.S. Decennial Census
