= Limp, Kentucky =

Unincorporated community in Kentucky, United States

- Unincorporated community
- Location within Kentucky Location within the United States
- Coordinates: 37°35′32″N 86°11′51″W
- Country: United States
- State: Kentucky
- County: Hardin
- Elevation: 722 ft (220 m)
- Time zone: UTC-5 (Eastern (EST))
  - Summer (DST): UTC-4 (EDT)
- Area codes: 270 & 364
- GNIS feature ID: 508465

Limp is an unincorporated community in Hardin County, Kentucky, United States.

A post office called Limp was established in 1884, and remained in operation until it was discontinued in 1934. Limp has been noted for its unusual place name.
