= Barefoot, Kentucky =

Unincorporated community in Kentucky, United States

Barefoot
- Unincorporated community
- Location within the state of Kentucky Barefoot (the United States)
- Coordinates: 38°25′25″N 84°7′1″W
- Country: United States
- State: Kentucky
- County: Nicholas
- Elevation: 725 ft (221 m)
- Time zone: UTC-5 (Eastern (EST))
  - Summer (DST): UTC-4 (EDT)
- GNIS feature ID: 507452

Barefoot is an unincorporated community located in Nicholas County, Kentucky, United States.

A post office called Barefoot was established in 1881, and remained in operation until it was discontinued in 1936. The origin of the name "Barefoot" is obscure. Barefoot has been noted for its unusual place name.
