= Eve, Kentucky =

Unincorporated community in Kentucky, United States

- Unincorporated community
- Location within Kentucky Location within the United States
- Coordinates: 37°18′40″N 85°40′43″W
- Country: United States
- State: Kentucky
- County: Green
- Elevation: 673 ft (205 m)
- Time zone: UTC-6 (Central (CST))
  - Summer (DST): UTC-5 (CDT)
- GNIS feature ID: 507959

Eve is an unincorporated community in Green, Kentucky, United States.
