= Weedonia, Kentucky =

Unincorporated community in Kentucky, United States

- Unincorporated community
- Location within Kentucky Location within the United States
- Coordinates: 38°29′56″N 83°45′24″W
- Country: United States
- State: Kentucky
- County: Mason
- Elevation: 843 ft (257 m)
- Time zone: UTC-5 (Eastern (EST))
  - Summer (DST): UTC-4 (EST)
- Area code: 606
- GNIS feature ID: 509332

Weedonia is an unincorporated community in Mason County, Kentucky, United States.
