= Maggard, Kentucky =

Unincorporated community in Kentucky, United States

- Unincorporated community
- Location within Kentucky Location within the United States
- Coordinates: 37°49′7″N 83°5′44″W
- Country: United States
- State: Kentucky
- County: Magoffin
- Elevation: 856 ft (261 m)
- Time zone: UTC-5 (Eastern (EST))
  - Summer (DST): UTC-4 (EDT)
- ZIP codes: 41465
- GNIS feature ID: 508525

Maggard is an unincorporated community within Magoffin County, Kentucky, United States, lying along Kentucky Route 1081 (aka Coon Creek Road). As of 2015, it consists of a general store, a bar, and several houses, often associated with small farms, stretched along the highway. A garage-service station is closed, and there are no other services or businesses. For the most part, the town is split by the highway into a hilly rise along one side and a dell along the other, each accommodating inhabited structures.
