= Roller Coaster Yard Sale =

Annual second-hand yard sale in Kentucky and Tennessee, United States

The Roller Coaster Yard Sale, sometimes referred to as the Roller Coaster Fair, is an outdoor second-hand sale held annually for 3 days beginning the first Thursday in October. It takes place along several U.S. and state routes in southern Kentucky and northern middle Tennessee.

== Event description and history ==
The event was started by Sarah Ann Bowers in 1986. She wanted to improve the beautiful Cordell Hull Highway (Kentucky Routes 63 and 90 in Barren County) and needed to prove that the road was very well traveled in the area. In 2001, over 140,000 travelers visited the area from miles around just to take in yard sales along the specific routes.

In 2002, the yard sale routes were extended onto Kentucky Route 163 south of Tompkinsville, and onto SR 51, SR 52 and SR 111 in parts of Clay, Overton, and Pickett counties in Middle Tennessee. Soon after that, US 127 in Clinton County, Kentucky and Kentucky Route 90 from Clinton County through Burkesville to Glasgow and Cave City, Kentucky were added to the Roller Coaster Fair itinerary to make the event go completely around the Dale Hollow Lake area.

The current yard sale route for this event, in terms of mileage, in the present day, totals about 159 miles (256 km), covering five counties in Kentucky and three counties in Tennessee.

== Roller Coaster Fair's designated routes ==
The Roller Coaster Fair takes place at several booths located along these routes listed below.

=== South-Central Kentucky (Leg 1) ===
- KY 63 (which is recognized as a Kentucky Scenic Byway) from Glasgow, Barren County to downtown Tompkinsville, Monroe County.
- KY 375 from downtown Tompkinsville to the southern junction with KY 163, and
- KY 163 from the KY 375 junction near Tompkinsville to the Tennessee State line via Hestand.

=== Middle Tennessee ===
- Tennessee State Route 51 (SR 51) entire route south from the Kentucky state line to Moss, Clay County
- Tennessee State Route 52 (SR 52) from Moss to Celina to Livingston (Overton County)
- Tennessee State Route 111 (SR 111, formerly SR 42) from Livingston, through Byrdstown, Pickett County, to the US 127 Junction at the Tennessee–Kentucky border near Static

=== South-Central Kentucky (Leg 2) ===
- US 127 in Clinton County from Static, through Albany, to the unincorporated community of Snow.
- KY 90 from Snow through Burkesville (Cumberland County) and Marrowbone, to Summer Shade (Metcalfe County), back through Glasgow, to its western terminus at the junction with KY 70 and Interstate 65 (I-65) at Cave City, about 5 miles (8.0 km) short of Mammoth Cave National Park.

== See also ==
- 127 Corridor Sale
- 400-Mile Sale
