= Temple Hill, Kentucky =

Unincorporated community in Kentucky, United States

Temple Hill
- Unincorporated community
- Location in Kentucky Location in United States
- Coordinates: 36°53′12″N 85°50′50″W
- Country: United States
- State: Kentucky
- County: Barren
- Elevation: 807 ft (246 m)
- Time zone: UTC-6 (Central (CST))
  - Summer (DST): UTC-5 (CST)
- ZIP codes: 42141
- Area code: 270
- GNIS feature ID: 505058

Temple Hill is an unincorporated community in Barren County, Kentucky, in the United States.

== History ==
=== Post office ===
The first post office here was established as "Skeggs Creek" (i.e., Skaggs Creek) on February 26, 1839, with Benjamin M. Payne as the first postmaster. In 1858, the postal name was changed to "Temple Hill”. This post office was discontinued in December, 1934.

== Geography ==
The community is located in the southeastern portion of Barren County at coordinates 36°53′12″N 85°50′50″W. It is located at the junction of Kentucky Routes 63 and 1324. KY 63 leads about 8.97 miles (14.44 km) north to Glasgow, and 17.36 miles (27.94 km) south to Tompkinsville.

== Points of interest ==
- Barren County Fairgrounds

== Education ==
Temple Hill is serviced by the Barren County Schools District. The community is home to Temple Hill Elementary, one of the five feeder schools for the Barren County Middle and High Schools.

== Annual events ==
Temple Hill is a popular stop for many bargain hunters attending the Roller Coaster Yard Sale, which takes place along KY 63's entire course between Tompkinsville and Glasgow, along with segments of Kentucky Route 90, U.S. Route 127, Tennessee State Routes 111, 52, and 51, as well as the first segment of KY 163 in eight counties in southern Kentucky and northeastern Middle Tennessee. The event is held during the first weekend of October.
