= Kentucky Route 100 =

State highway in Kentucky, USA

Kentucky Route 100
- KY 100 highlighted in red

Route information
- Maintained by KYTC
- Length: 102.060 mi (164.250 km)

Major junctions
- West end: US 79 in Russellville
- US 31W in Franklin; I-65 near Franklin; US 31E / US 231 near Scottsville
- East end: KY 90 near Waterview

Location
- Country: United States
- State: Kentucky
- Counties: Logan, Simpson, Allen, Monroe, Cumberland

Highway system
- Kentucky State Highway System; Interstate; US; State; Parkways
← KY 99	→ KY 101

Kentucky Route 100 (KY 100) is a 102.060-mile (164.250 km) state highway in south-central Kentucky. The highway begins at an intersection with US 79 in Russellville in Logan County and travels east through Simpson, Allen, and Monroe Counties before ending at an intersection with KY 90 near Waterview in Cumberland County. --- Please note that the stated 102.060-mile overall length does not reflect changes made since this designation; in 2026, carefully measured county-by-county and verified by county milemarkers, actual on-the-ground overall length is 94.65-miles, a discrepancy of over 7-miles; this throws off the measurements in the "Major Intersections" Chart and it cannot be relied on for accuracy.

The route serves the cities of Franklin, Scottsville, and Tompkinsville. According to the Caves, Lakes, and Corvettes regional brochure by the Kentucky Department of Tourism, the entire KY 100 corridor is considered a Kentucky Scenic Byway.

== Route description ==
Kentucky Route 100 begins at an intersection with US 79 (Russellville Bypass) on the eastern edge of Russellville in Logan County. From its western terminus, the highway travels east through the rolling farmland of southern Logan County, briefly sharing a concurrency with KY 663 before crossing into Simpson County.

In Simpson County, KY 100 enters Franklin, where it briefly runs concurrently with US 31W through downtown and overlaps KY 73 for a short distance. East of downtown, the route passes an interchange with Interstate 65 (Exit 6), providing access to the interstate, before continuing through the rural communities of Hickory Flat and Gold City.

After entering Allen County, KY 100 continues east through predominantly agricultural countryside to Scottsville, where it intersects the concurrent routes of US 31E and US 231. East of Scottsville, the highway passes through the community of Holland before crossing into Monroe County.

Within Monroe County, KY 100 serves the communities of Fountain Run, Flippin, Gamaliel, and Tompkinsville. The route briefly overlaps KY 63 in Gamaliel and again through part of downtown Tompkinsville. East of Tompkinsville, the highway continues through wooded hills and rural farmland before entering Cumberland County.

In Cumberland County, KY 100 continues east through sparsely populated rural terrain before reaching its eastern terminus at an intersection with KY 90 near Waterview.

== History ==
Kentucky Route 100 was established as part of Kentucky's original numbered state highway system during the late 1920s. Its original western terminus was located near downtown Russellville, while its eastern terminus was located approximately 3 miles (4.8 km) west of Burkesville at KY 90. The original alignment passed through several small communities, including Leslie and Arat.

Between 1945 and 1958, KY 100 was rerouted near its eastern end. The final portion of the route and its eastern terminus were relocated westward to a new intersection with KY 90 near Waterview. The former alignment toward Burkesville was later redesignated as portions of KY 1205 and KY 691. Other sections of the original route were removed from the state highway system or transferred to local maintenance in Cumberland County.

The western end of KY 100 was later modified as part of improvements to the Russellville Bypass. In 2015, the western terminus was moved from its former location near downtown Russellville to an intersection with US 68 and US 68 Business on the east side of the city. In 2018, the western terminus was moved again to its current location at Franklin Road and the southern loop of the Russellville Bypass, following the relocation of US 79 onto the bypass.

== Major intersections ==
County	Location	mi	km	Destinations	Notes
Logan	Russellville	0.00	0.00	US 79 (Russellville Bypass) / Franklin Road	Western terminus of KY-100; road continues westward solely as Franklin Road
Logan		4.148	6.676	KY 663 south (Corinth Road)	West end of KY 663 concurrency
Logan		4.843	7.794	KY 2369 north (Dennis-Corinth Road)	Southern terminus of KY 2369
Logan		6.390	10.284	KY 663 north (Friendship Road)	Eastern end of KY 663 concurrency
Simpson	Middleton	9.310	14.983	KY 103 north (Middleton Road)	Southern terminus of KY 103
Simpson	Middleton	9.793	15.760	KY 665 (George Taylor Road)	
Simpson	Franklin	17.802	28.650	KY 1008 east (McLendon Road)	Western terminus of KY 1008
Simpson	Franklin	18.758	30.188	US 31W north (North Main Street) / KY 73 north	Northern end of US 31W concurrency; western end of KY 73 concurrency
Simpson	Franklin	18.812	30.275	KY 383 west (West Madison Street)	Eastern terminus of KY 383
Simpson	Franklin	18.994	30.568	US 31W south (South Main Street) to I-65	Southern end of US 31W concurrency
Simpson	Franklin	19.967	32.134	KY 1008 (Harding Road)	The Medical Center at Franklin to the south
Simpson	Franklin	20.591	33.138	KY 73 south (Rapids Road) to KY 585	KY 585 one block north of intersection; eastern end of KY 73 concurrency
Simpson	Franklin	21.703– 21.798	34.928– 35.080	I-65 – Nashville, Louisville	I-65 Exit 6
Simpson	Hickory Flat	25.232	40.607	KY 662 (Hickory Flat-Rapids Road / Hickory Flat-Gold City Road)	
Simpson		27.731	44.629	KY 2061 north (Reeder School Road)	Southern terminus of KY 2061
Allen		31.351	50.455	KY 482 east (Calvert Road)	Western terminus of KY 482
Allen		33.945	54.629	KY 2163 west (Perrytown Road)	Eastern terminus of KY 2163
Allen		38.232	61.528	KY 585 west (Old Franklin Road)	Eastern terminus of KY 585
Allen	Scottsville	40.666	65.446	US 31E / US 231 (New Gallatin Road) – Information Center, Quail Hollow Candle & Gifts	The Medical Center at Scottsville to the north
Allen	Scottsville	41.112	66.163	KY 3500 south (Old Gallatin Road)	Northern terminus of KY 3500
Allen	Scottsville	42.294	68.066	KY 2160 south (Old Hartsville Road)	Northern terminus of KY 2160
Allen	Scottsville	42.453	68.321	KY 980 west (Bowling Green Road) to US 31E / US 231	Eastern terminus of KY 980; access to The Medical Center at Scottsville
Allen	Scottsville	42.852	68.964	KY 101 north (Smiths Grove Road)	Southern terminus of KY 101
Allen	Scottsville	43.153	69.448	KY 98 east (East Main Street)	Western terminus of KY 98
Allen		45.256	72.832	KY 1421 south (Mt. Union Road)	Northern terminus of KY 1421
Allen		49.358	79.434	KY 671 north (Pitchford Ridge Road)	Southern terminus of KY 671
Allen	Holland	51.618	83.071	KY 99 south (Lafayette Road)	Northern terminus of KY 99
Monroe	Fountain Run	57.909	93.196	KY 98 west (Brownsford Road) – Scottsville, Bowling Green	Eastern terminus of KY 98
Monroe	Fountain Run	58.346	93.899	KY 87 (Main Street/Akersville Road)	
Monroe	Fountain Run	58.725	94.509	KY 2170 west (College Street)	Eastern terminus of KY 2170
Monroe	Flippin	63.564	102.296	KY 678 (White Oak Ridge Road/Mudlick-Flippin Road)	
Monroe	Flippin	64.241	103.386	KY 249 north (Flippin Lamb Road)	Southern terminus of KY 249
Monroe		64.985	104.583	KY 1366 east (County House Road)	Western terminus of KY 1366
Monroe	Gamaliel	71.206	114.595	KY 792 south (Stanford Street)	Northern terminus of KY 792
Monroe	Gamaliel	71.941	115.778	KY 63 south (Red Boiling Springs Road) to KY 382	Western end of KY 63 concurrency
Monroe		76.912	123.778	KY 1860 south	Northern terminus of KY 1860
Monroe	Tompkinsville	78.280	125.979	KY 1366 west (County House Road)	Eastern terminus of KY 1366
Monroe	Tompkinsville	79.648	128.181	KY 375 north / KY 63 north	Western end of KY 375 concurrency; Eastern end of KY 63 concurrency
Monroe	Tompkinsville	79.704	128.271	KY 1446 south (South Magnoila Street) / KY 375 south (East 4th Street)	Northern terminus of KY 1446; Eastern end of KY 375 concurrency
Monroe	Tompkinsville	80.204	129.076	KY 3144 east (Capp Harlan Road)	Western terminus of KY 3144; access to Monroe County Medical Center
Monroe	Tompkinsville	81.361	130.938	KY 163 (Tompkinsville Bypass)	
Monroe		82.071	132.080	KY 2441 north (Lyons Chapel Road)	Southern terminus of KY 2441; access to Tompkinsville-Monroe County Airport
Monroe		86.227	138.769	KY 214 east (Turkey Neck Bend Road)	Western terminus of KY 214
Monroe		90.882– 90.954	146.260– 146.376	KY 2439 south (Center Point Road)	Y junction; northern terminus of KY 2439
Cumberland		97.214	156.451	KY 3115 north (Gray Gap Road)	Southern terminus of KY 3115
Cumberland	Waterview	102.06	164.25	KY 90 (Glasgow Road)	Eastern terminus of KY 100
1.000 mi = 1.609 km; 1.000 km = 0.621 mi: Concurrency terminus

== Related routes ==
=== Kentucky Route 100 Truck ===
Kentucky Route 100 Truck
- Location: Franklin, Simpson County
- Length: 3.418 mi (5.501 km)

Kentucky Route 100 Truck (KY 100 Truck) is a truck route of KY 100 in Franklin, Simpson County. The route follows KY 1008 along the southern side of Franklin, allowing commercial truck traffic to bypass the downtown section of KY 100. The truck route consists of the first 3.418 miles (5.501 km) of KY 1008.
