= Kentucky Route 375 =

State highway in Monroe County, Kentucky, United States

Kentucky Route 375

Route information
- Maintained by KYTC
- Length: 3.3 mi (5.3 km)
- Existed: 2020–present

Major junctions
- South end: KY 163 southeast of Tompkinsville
- KY 63 / KY 100 in Tompkinsville
- North end: KY 163 in Tompkinsville

Location
- Country: United States
- State: Kentucky
- Counties: Monroe

Highway system
- Kentucky State Highway System; Interstate; US; State; Parkways
← KY 374	→ KY 376

Kentucky Route 375 (KY 375) is a north–south state highway located entirely in Monroe County in south-central Kentucky.

== Route description ==
Both of the route's termini are intersections with KY 163 southeast and north of Tompkinsville. It is one of the main thoroughfares in the city of Tompkinsville, with junctions with KY 1446 and then KY 63 and KY 100 in downtown Tompkinsville. At the intersection with KY 63 and KY 100, KY 375 turns on a northerly course to its second junction with KY 163 on the northern end of town.

== History ==
In the 90 years since Kentucky's state highway system was established, KY 163 was the original north–south thoroughfare through the city of Tompkinsville. In 2020, KY 163 was rerouted to the new Tompkinsville Bypass, which was opened to traffic after almost three years since construction began in November 2017. Once the bypass route was completed and opened to traffic in 2020, KY 163 was rerouted onto the bypass; the old alignment of KY 163 in Tompkinsville was redesignated as KY 375.

The original KY 375 ran from KY 159 northeast of Falmouth southeast to KY 22 in Pendleton County. This route was removed from the state highway system by 1977, but was added back to the state highway system on May 4, 1987, as KY 3173.

== Major intersections ==
The entire route is in Monroe County.

Location	mi	km	Destinations	Notes
	0.000	0.000	KY 163 (Tompkinsville Bypass) – Edmonton, Celina, Tompkinsville-Monroe County Airport	Southern terminus; road continues south as KY 163 (Celina Road)
Tompkinsville	1.459	2.348	KY 1446 south (South Magnolia Street) / KY 100 east (North Magnolia Street) – Old Mulkey Meetinghouse State Park, Burkesville, Tompkinsville-Monroe County Airport	Southern end of KY 100 currency; northern terminus of KY 1446
Tompkinsville	1.515	2.438	KY 63 (West 4th Street) / KY 100 west (Main Street) – Gamaliel, Glasgow	Northern end of KY 100 currency; road continues straight ahead as KY 63 northbound (West 4th Street)
Tompkinsville	1.575	2.535	KY 2166 north (Columbia Avenue)	Southern terminus of KY 2166
Tompkinsville	2.815	4.530	KY 2166 south (Columbia Avenue)	Northern terminus of KY 2166
Tompkinsville	2.876	4.628	KY 2165 west (Armory Road) / KY 1049 north (Radio Station Road)	Eastern terminus of KY 2165; southern terminus of KY 1049
Tompkinsville	3.350	5.391	KY 163 (Edmonton Road) – Edmonton	Northern terminus; road continues north as KY 163 (Edmonton Road)
1.000 mi = 1.609 km; 1.000 km = 0.621 mi: Concurrency terminus
