= Barlow Baxter House =

Historic house in Kentucky, United States

- U.S. National Register of Historic Places
- Location: Celina Rd. (KY 163), Hestand, Kentucky
- Coordinates: 36°39′13″N 85°37′42″W
- Area: less than one acre
- Built: 1904
- Architectural style: Prow house
- MPS: Monroe County, Kentucky MPS
- NRHP reference No.: 01000795
- Added to NRHP: August 2, 2001

The Barlow Baxter House is a prow house-style house in Hestand, Kentucky which was built in 1904. It was listed on the National Register of Historic Places in 2001.

Its 2001 NRHP nomination describes it:

The Barlow Baxter House was built ca. 1904, and is a two-story frame dwelling built in a "prow house" type. The house has very simplified Queen Anne-style detailing in its milled porch columns and railing which extends around three facades of the projecting wing. The house has a gable roof of original metal standing seam, interior brick chimneys, a concrete block and poured concrete foundation, and exterior of weatherboard siding. On the main (W), south, and east facades is a two-story wraparound porch. The porch has a concrete floor, original chamfered wood columns, cut out eave brackets, and an original milled railing with square balusters.
