= Kentucky Route 63 =

State highway in Kentucky, United States

Kentucky Route 63

Route information
- Maintained by KYTC
- Length: 35.783 mi (57.587 km)

Major junctions
- South end: SR 56 just south of Gamaliel
- KY 382 near Gamaliel; KY 100 at Gamaliel; KY 100 / KY 163 in Tompkinsville; KY 1324 at Temple Hill
- North end: US 31E Bus. in Glasgow

Location
- Country: United States
- State: Kentucky
- Counties: Barren, Monroe

Highway system
- Kentucky State Highway System; Interstate; US; State; Parkways
← US 62	→ I-64

Kentucky Route 63 (KY 63) is a north–south state highway that traverses Monroe and Barren counties in south central Kentucky.

== Route description ==
=== Monroe County ===
KY 63 starts at the Tennessee state line, where the road continues southward as Tennessee State Route 56 (SR 56). Just north of that point is Gamaliel, where it intersects Bugtussle Road (KY 382), and begins its concurrency with KY 100. The two routes have intersections with KY 1860, and KY 1366 during the concurrency from Gamaliel to Tompkinsville. The two routes split at their junction with KY 375 (a former alignment of KY 163) in Tompkinsville. KY 63 turns northwestward to the KY 678 junction at Mount Hermon.

=== Barren County ===
After entering Barren County, it meets KY 1324 at Temple Hill. KY 63 continues northwest to Glasgow, traversing the Louie B. Nunn Cumberland Expressway via an overpass. The route ends with U.S. 31E Business just south of the Barren County Courthouse. A few KY 63 trailblazer signs are posted in a few locations in that city.

On November 8, 2021, the Kentucky Transportation Cabinet finished realigning a portion of KY 63 (also known as Tompkinsville Road) between the Cumberland Expressway overpass and Fox Trail, to improve safety by avoiding curving down a hillside.

=== Status as a scenic byway ===
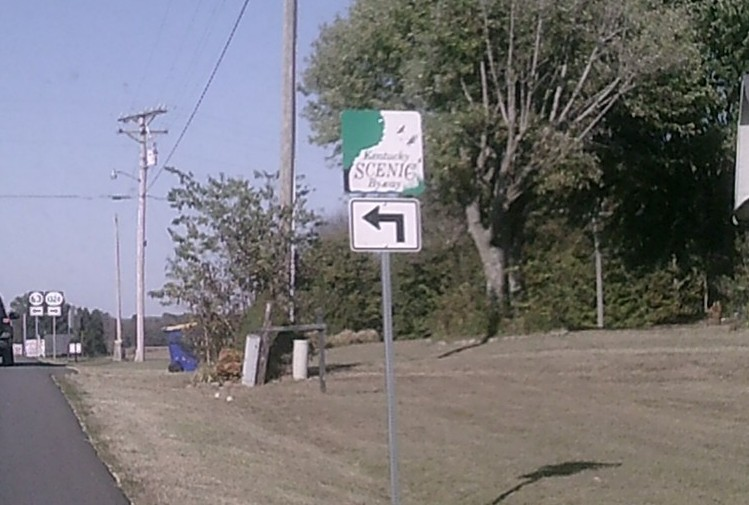
The segment of KY 63 from Tompkinsville to Glasgow is considered a part of the Kentucky Scenic Byway system.

Most of the KY 63 corridor between Tompkinsville and Glasgow is recognized as a Kentucky Scenic Byway, which signifies that KY 63 provides a scenic drive through most of its course in Monroe and Barren counties. Also, KY 63, along with the first 10 miles (16 km) of KY 90 and parts of KY 70 between Mammoth Cave National Park and Cave City are parts of the "Cordell Hull Scenic Highway".

== History ==
Since 1986, KY 63 from Tompkinsville to Glasgow, along with KY 90 northwest of Glasgow, is the core route of the annual Roller Coaster Yard Sale.

== Points of interest along the route ==
- Barren County Fairgrounds, Temple Hill

== Major intersections ==
County	Location	mi	km	Destinations	Notes
Monroe		0.000	0.000	SR 56 south (Gamaliel Road) / Ivan Holcomb Road	Continuation into Tennessee as SR 56
Monroe	Gamaliel	1.211	1.949	KY 382 west (West Main Street)	Western terminus of KY 382
Monroe	Gamaliel	1.300	2.092	KY 100 west (Fountain Run Road)	South end of KY 100 overlap
Monroe		6.271	10.092	KY 1860 east (Red Hill-Harlan Crossroads Road) – Harlan Crossroads	Western terminus of KY 1860
Monroe		8.089	13.018	KY 1366 west (County House Road)	Eastern terminus of KY 1366
Monroe	Tompkinsville	9.457	15.220	KY 100 east (East 4th Street) / KY 375 – Tompkinsville-Monroe County Airport	North end of KY 100 overlap; 375 to the north and east; 100 to the east; 63 goes west; hospital and airport to the east
Monroe	Tompkinsville	9.516	15.315	KY 2172 north (Spruce Street)	Southern terminus of KY 2172
Monroe	Tompkinsville	9.625	15.490	KY 2172 (South Jackson Street/North Jackson Street)	
Monroe		10.815	17.405	KY 859 north (Sulphur Lick Road)	Southern terminus of KY 859
Monroe		13.440	21.630	KY 2452 north (Sand Lick Road)	Southern terminus of KY 2452
Monroe	Mud Lick	16.158	26.004	KY 870 south (Mud Lick-Flippin Road)	Northern terminus of KY 870
Monroe	Mount Hermon	20.816	33.500	KY 678 west (Stringtown-Flippin Road) – Flippin	South end of KY 678 overlap
Monroe	Mount Hermon	20.836	33.532	KY 678 east (Mount Hermon Road)	North end of KY 678 overlap
Barren		21.959	35.340	KY 820 west (Etoile Road) – Etoile	Eastern terminus of KY 820
Barren		26.816	43.156	KY 1324 south (Temple Hill Road)	Northern terminus of KY 1324
Barren	Glasgow	35.783	57.587	US 31E Bus. (South Green Street)	Northern terminus
1.000 mi = 1.609 km; 1.000 km = 0.621 mi: Concurrency terminus
