= Prow house =

Type of house where the front is angled outward

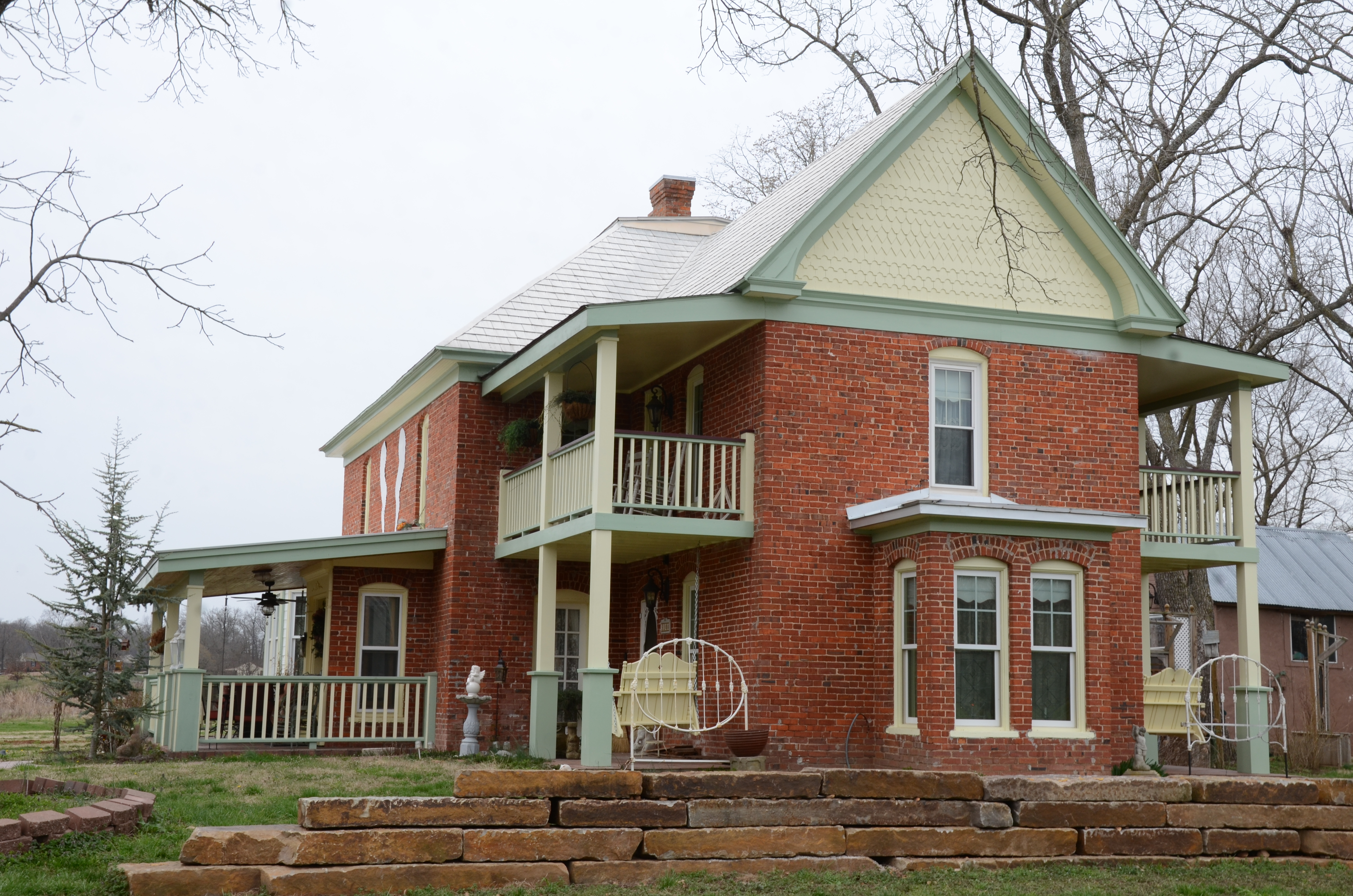
The James House has a flat-front prow (NRHP-listed)

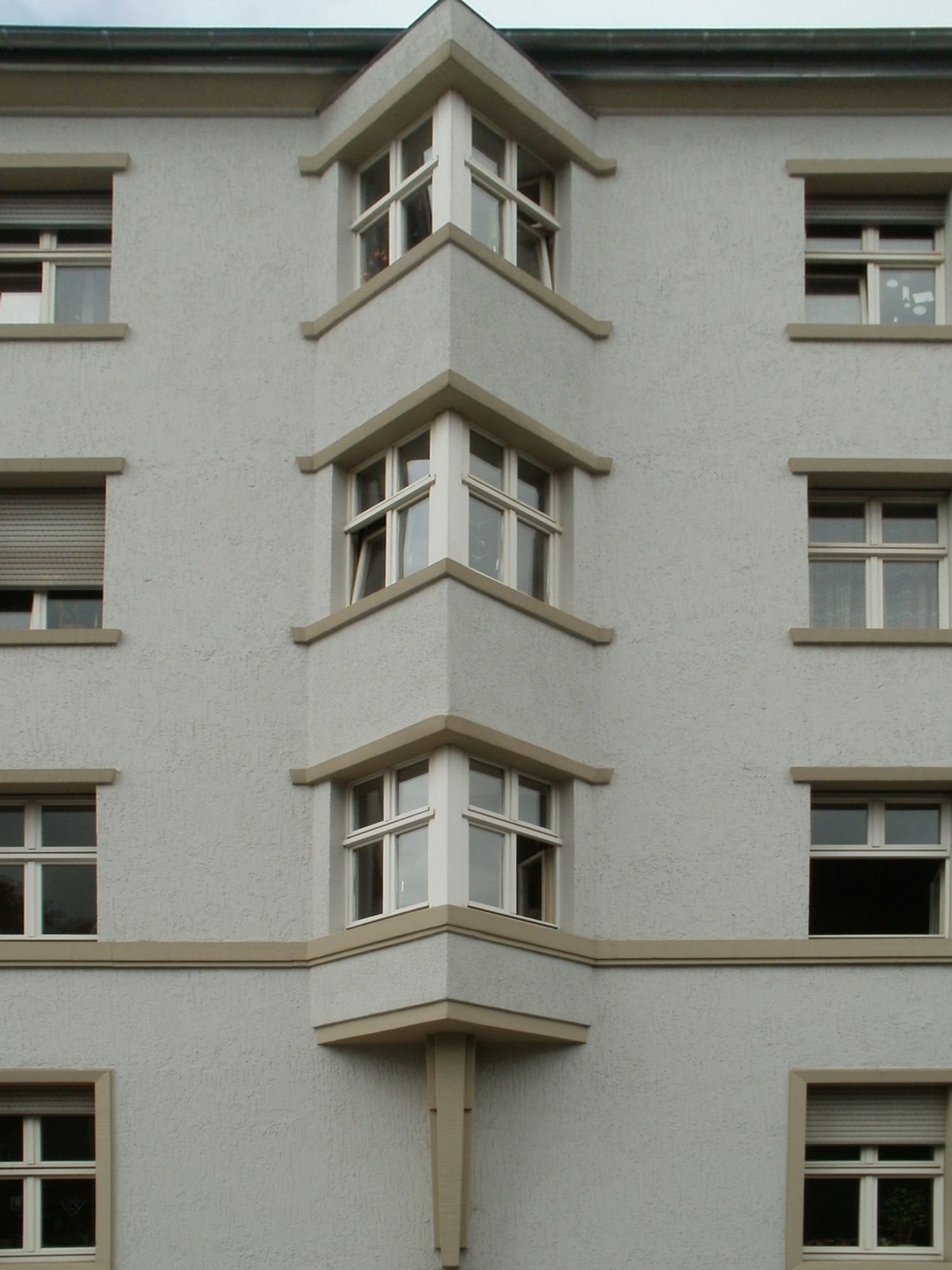
Prow windows

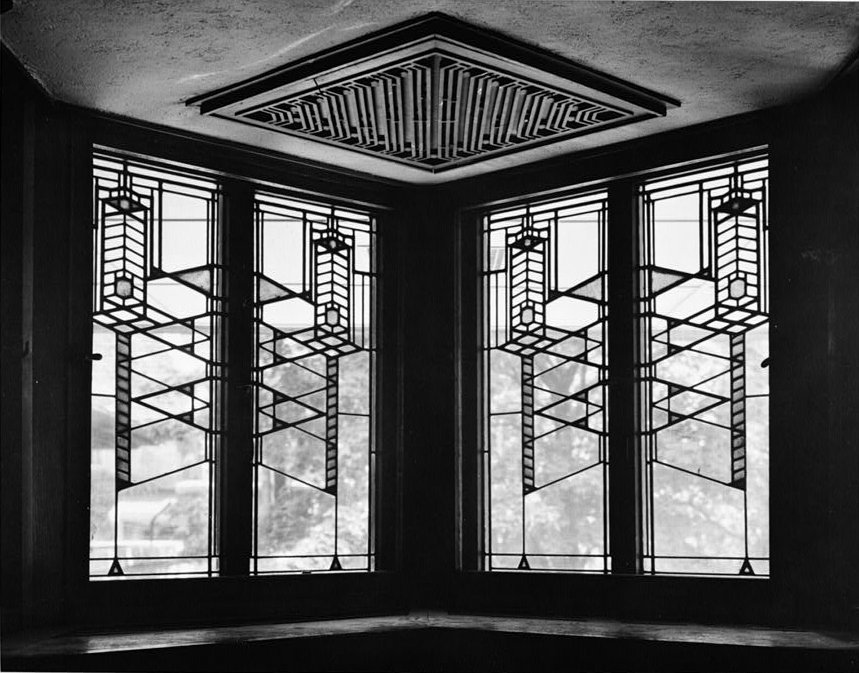
Interior view of prow bay window

Prow or "winged" gable roof

Prow house is an American term for a house with a projecting front portion that resembles the prow of a ship. The T-shaped plan differs from conventional layouts in which the main facade runs parallel to the street. The style and name originated in Arkansas in the nineteenth century, and contemporary versions are used particularly to accentuate views from within the house in scenic areas.

== Origin ==
The design began as an adaption of traditional residential architecture, with the front projection added to the standard square or rectangular layout. Due to a more complicated design, they were never constructed from logs and did not appear until around 1880. At the end of the 19th century, the design was a status symbol representing the wealth of prosperous farmers. The house most resembles a ship's prow when the projection is chamfered having an acute angle at the front. It was given the name by Cyrus Sutherland, professor at the University of Arkansas's School of Architecture for over thirty years and an expert on Arkansas vernacular architecture. The name originated as a local name in the Ozark Mountain region.

Early examples of the prow house have characteristics of the Queen Anne style which was popular at the time and tend to be heavily decorated. These houses usually had two front doors, one on either side of the prow, rather than a single front door near the front of the projecting room which would be more likely for a school or church. The "prow" room, being exposed to the exterior on three sides, had excellent cross-ventilation. Prow houses, dating from 1880 to 1920 can be found in Arkansas, Missouri, and Iowa. The houses tended to be clustered in certain communities, such as Prairie Grove and Elkins, Arkansas which may be the result of their construction being a specialty of certain builders. In more rural areas, the houses tended to be smaller with less ornamentation.

== Contemporary designs ==
Prow houses are often built today in areas with a significant view, such as mountains, lakes, or other natural scenery and are more common in the western US. Modern prow houses often feature extensive glazing to maximize light and view. Such prows are often multi-story with clearstory interiors and can be designed with masonry, log home, timber frame, and traditional framing construction.

== Prow window ==
A small projection of a building, similar to a bay window but constructed with two planes meeting at a center angle forming a triangular bay, can also be called a prow. Examples of such projections can be found on the Frank Lloyd Wright designed Robie House and Arthur Heurtley House.

== Prow gable roof ==
An extension of a gable roof wherein the ridgeline is extended at the peak of the gable creating an angled eave elongated at the ridge is known as a prow or "winged" gable. This roof detail could occur on a forward facing prow but is most commonly found on the end gables of ranch houses and other mid-20th century designs. It added additional shading and rain screening at the gable, but was used mostly for the "modern" styling it evoked.

== Historic prow houses ==
- James House (c.1903), Rogers, Arkansas
- Lillard-Sprague House (1907), Rogers, Arkansas
- Willits House (1901), Highland Park, Illinois
- Robie House (1909), Chicago, Illinois
- Barlow Baxter House (1904), Hestand, Kentucky
- Sanders-Hollabaugh House (1903), Marshall, Arkansas

== Examples ==
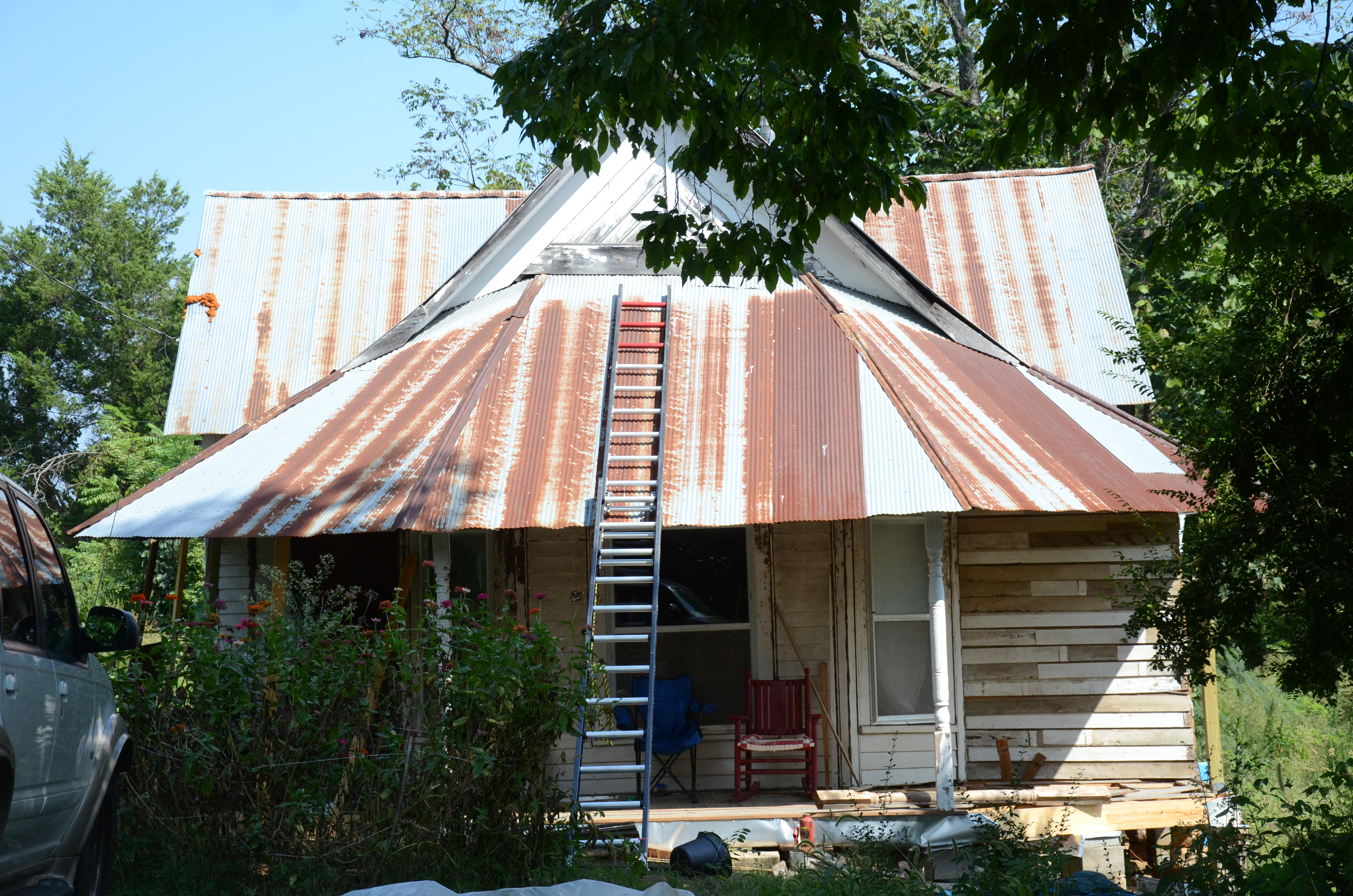
The Sanders-Hollabaugh house, with an uncharacteristic front door (NRHP-listed)

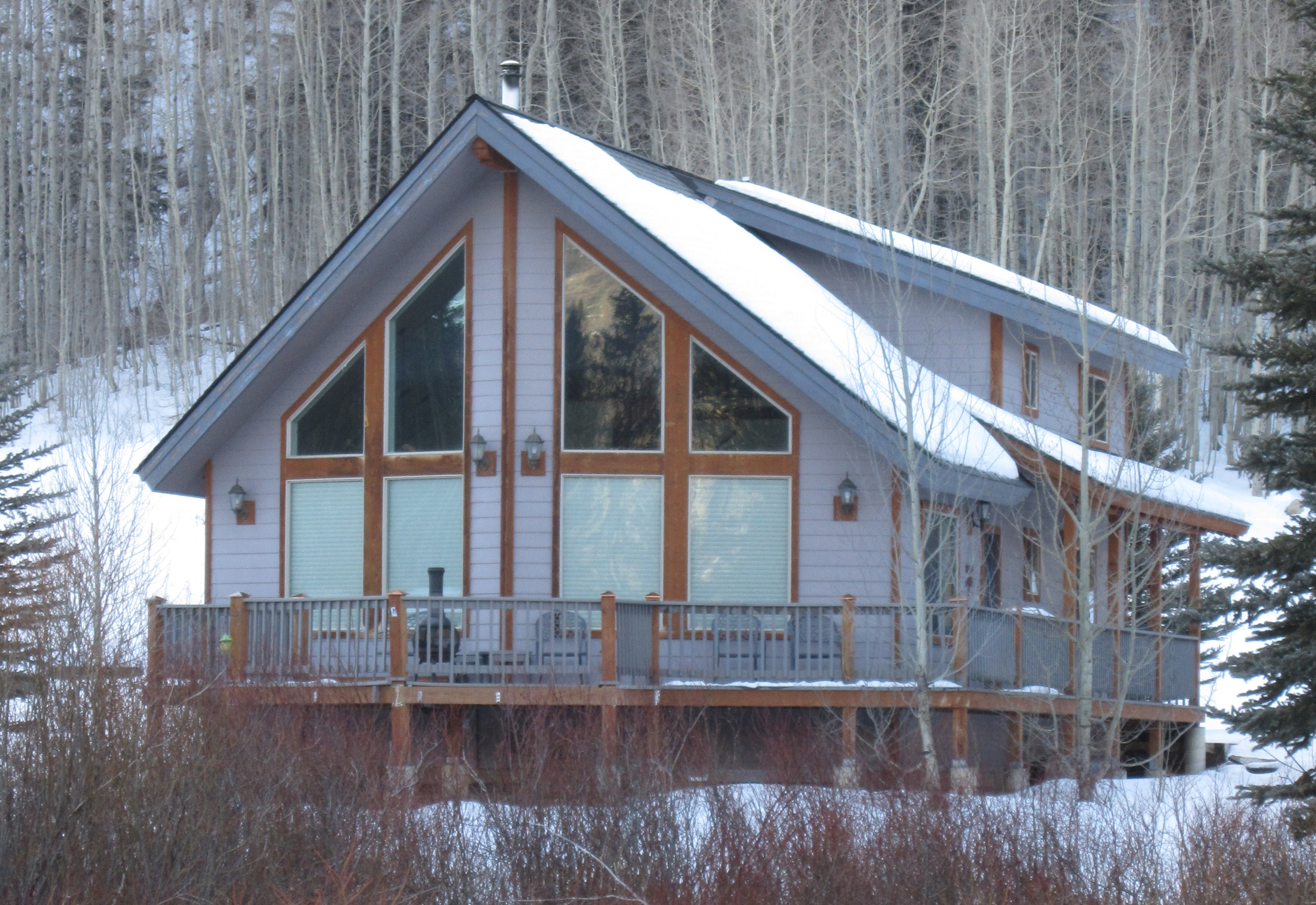
Contemporary prow house

== Other building types ==
Non-residential buildings with an angled front include:

- The First Unitarian Society of Madison building in Shorewood Hills, Wisconsin, designed by Frank Lloyd Wright, is a U.S. National Historic Landmark characterized by a prow-like roof.
- The iconic Flatiron Building in New York City has a prow-front design necessitated by the triangular shape of the lot on which it was constructed.
- The Mercure Liverpool Atlantic Tower Hotel in Liverpool, England is a hotel with a prow shape.
- Maple Lake United Methodist Church, Spring Brook, Pennsylvania.
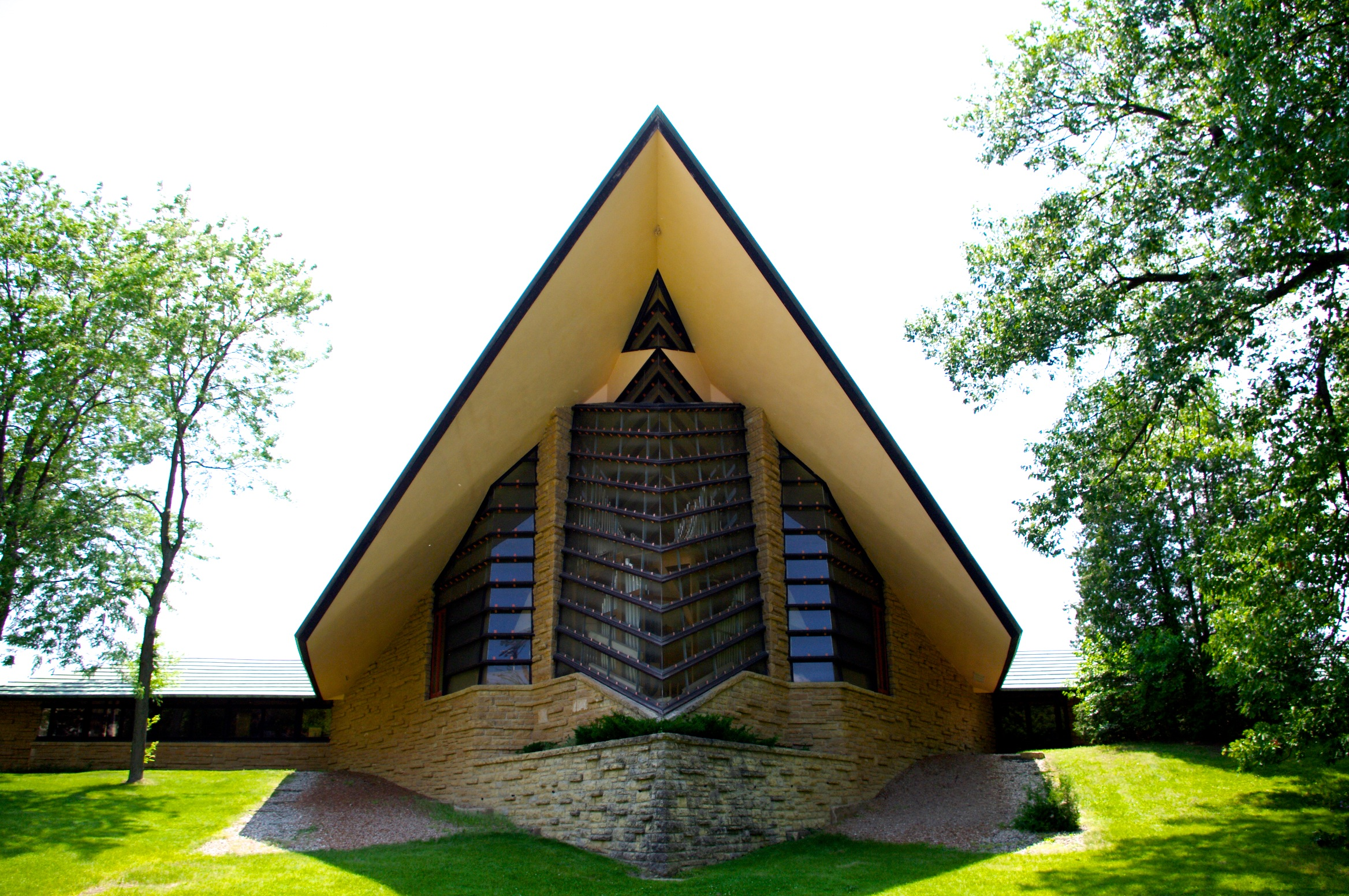
First Unitarian Society of Madison

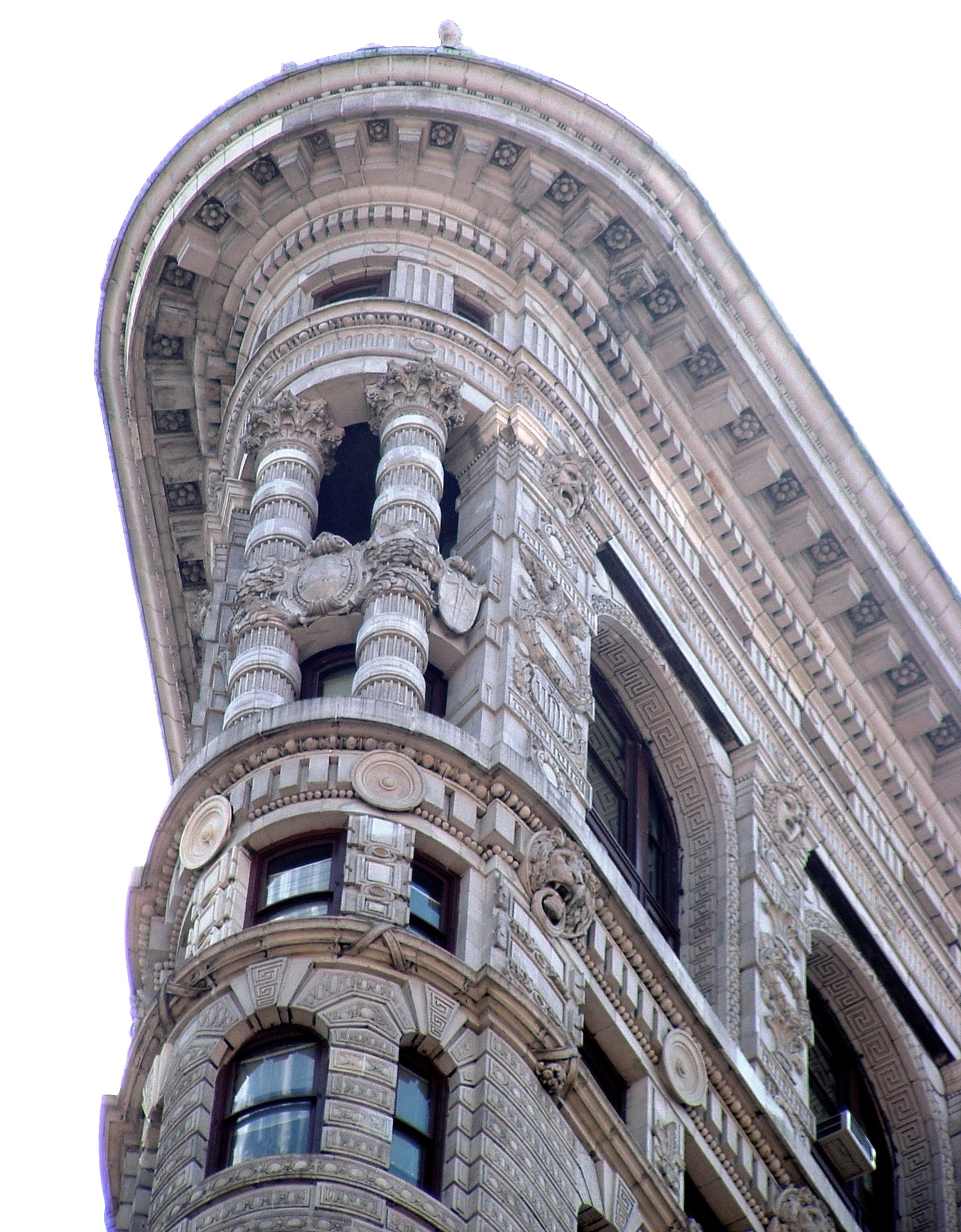
Flatiron Building

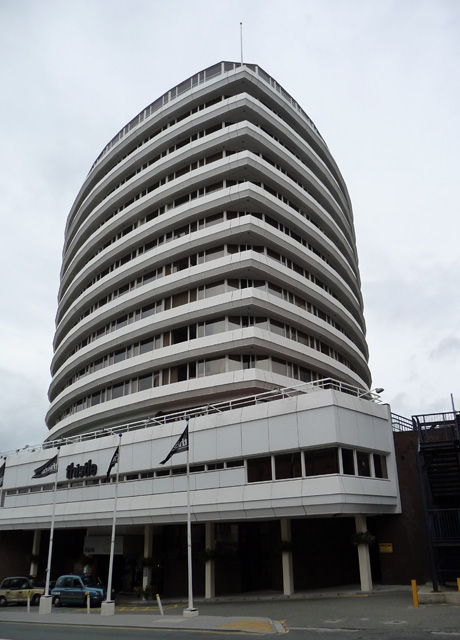
Mercure Liverpool Atlantic Tower Hotel

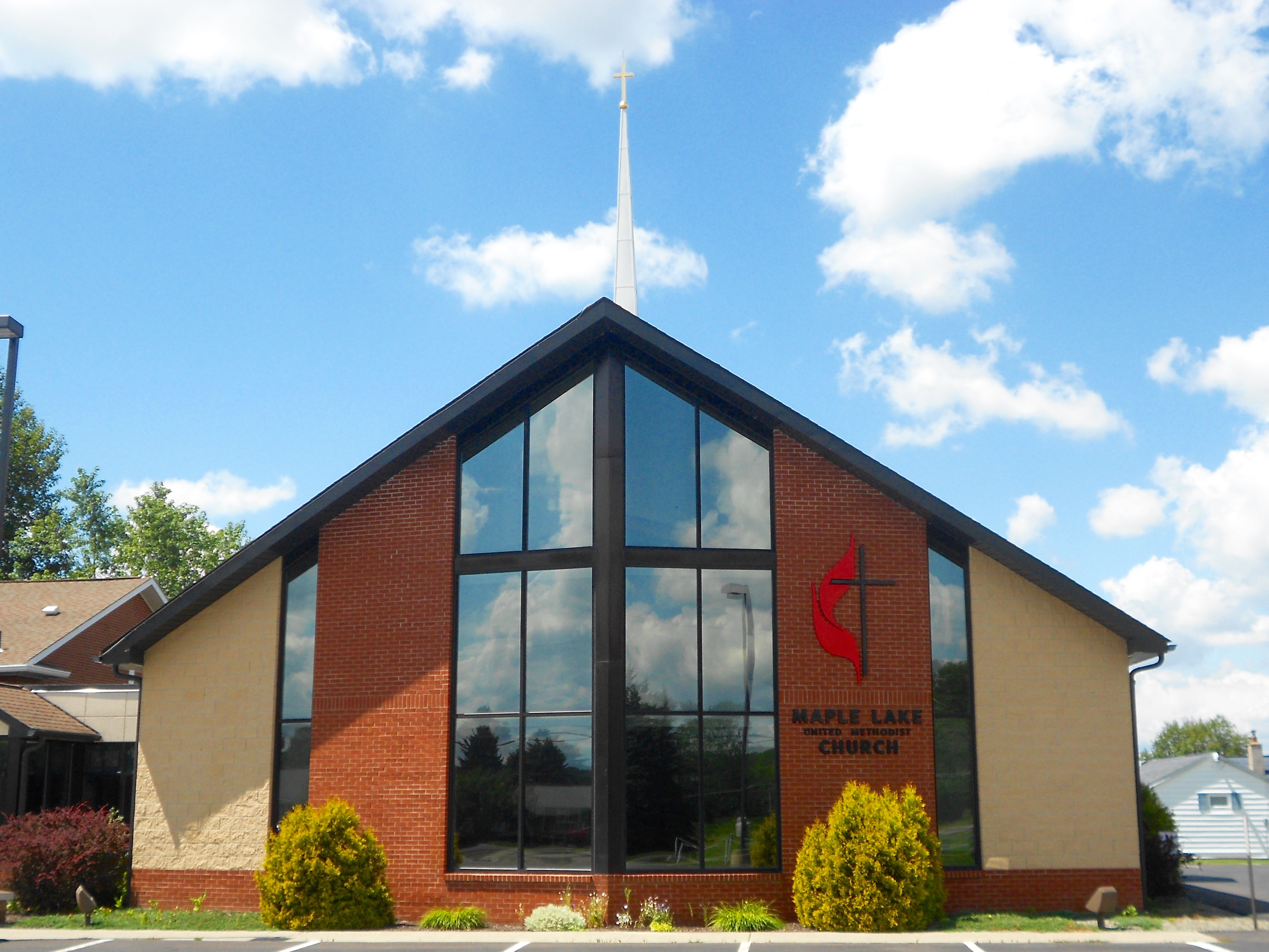
Maple Lake United Methodist Church, Spring Brook, Pennsylvania
