= Tennessee State Route 261 =

State highway in Tennessee, USA

State Route 261
- Galen Road
- SR 261 highlighted in red

Route information
- Maintained by TDOT
- Length: 13.8 mi (22.2 km)
- Existed: July 1, 1983–present

Major junctions
- South end: SR 52 in Lafayette
- SR 10 in Lafayette
- North end: KY 382 at the Kentucky state line in Bugtussle, KY

Location
- Country: United States
- State: Tennessee
- Counties: Macon

Highway system
- Tennessee State Routes; Interstate; US; State
← SR 260	→ SR 262

State Route 261 (SR 261) is a north–south secondary state highway that is located entirely in Macon County in Middle Tennessee. The route’s length is roughly 13.8 miles (22.2 km).

== Route description ==
SR 261's southern terminus is located in Lafayette at a junction with SR 52. SR 261 travels for 0.2 miles (0.32 km) to the Public Square in downtown Lafayette to run concurrent with SR 10 for an additional 0.5 miles (0.80 km).

SR 261 travels northeastward while being known as Galen Road, traversing the unincorporated community of Galen. Its northern terminus is the point where it becomes Kentucky Route 382 (KY 382) at the Kentucky state line in southern Monroe County near Bugtussle.

== Major intersections ==
The entire route is in Macon County.

Location	mi	km	Destinations	Notes
Lafayette	0.0	0.0	SR 52 (Highway 52 W) – Westmoreland, Red Boiling Springs	Southern terminus; road continues solely as Red Boiling Springs Road (Old SR 52) beyond SR 52
Lafayette	0.2	0.32	SR 10 south (College Street) to SR 52 – Hartsville	Circle around the public square; southern end of SR 10 overlap
Lafayette	0.7	1.1	SR 10 north (Scottsville Road) – Scottsville KY	Northern end of SR 10 overlap
	13.8	22.2	KY 382 east (Bugtussle Road) – Gamaliel, Tompkinsville	Northern terminus at the Kentucky state line
1.000 mi = 1.609 km; 1.000 km = 0.621 mi

== History ==
Until 2023, the road beyond SR 261's eastern terminus at the state line was signed as a split section of KY 87, which was separated into two segments on the Kentucky side of the state line. That segment was re-signed as KY 382 in April 2023.
