= 400-Mile Sale =

Annual second-hand yard sale in Kentucky, United States

The 400-Mile Sale, sometimes referred to as the Highway 68 Yard Sale, is an outdoor second-hand sale held annually for four days, beginning in the first weekend of June. It takes place along U.S. Route 68 (US 68) in the U.S. state of Kentucky. It is held in almost all areas along the US 68 corridor from the east side of Paducah through southern and central Kentucky, and ending at Maysville.

== History ==
The 400 Mile Sale was founded in 2004 by Debbie Spencer whose goal was to bring awareness of antique and curiosity shops along the route. Leadership was passed to Judy Spencer in 2019. Tara Hall became the Director of the 400 Mile Sale in March 2022. The event took place every year since its inaugural sale, although in 2020, it was rescheduled to October 2–4 due to the COVID-19 pandemic.

Counties along the route have always been the primary sponsors of the sale. The sponsors of the 2022 yard sale were Kentucky Lake/Marshall County Tourism, Cadiz/Trigg County Tourism, Visit Hopkinsville, City of Elkton, Logan County Tourism and Chamber of Commerce, the City of Auburn, Edmonton-Metcalfe Chamber of Commerce, Taylor County Tourism, Visit Lebanon, Perryville Main Street Association, Visit Harrodsburg, and Visit Jessamine. In 2023, the yard sales in Perryville will be sponsored by Perryville Outlet Furniture, the sale's first business sponsor.

== Further information ==
=== Areas exempt from the event ===
A 10-mile-long (16 km) stretch of the concurrently running US 68 and KY 80 in the Land Between the Lakes National Recreation Area in western Trigg County is excluded from the yard sale route because the recreation area is the property of a government organization, the U.S. Forest Service. Another gap in the sale route is a 20-mile-long (32 km) stretch of US 68 in Metropolitan Lexington and Fayette County, which is also excluded on account of high traffic volume, especially in downtown Lexington, where traffic is usually highly congested.

=== Other events in the area during the yard sale ===
A town-wide yard sale in the eastern Warren County town of Smiths Grove is often held during the US 68 Yard Sale just off the highway. Elkton, the Todd County seat also has a lot of yard sales during the event, even if on other streets. The Glasgow Highland Games at Barren River Lake State Resort Park, well south of the US 68 corridor along U.S. Route 31E, is often held during the same weekend as the 400 mile yard sale.

== Media coverage ==
In southern Kentucky, the event is regularly publicized on the local level on ABC/Fox dual network affiliate WBKO in Bowling Green as that station's studio facilities are located on the yard sale route.

During the event in June 2015, the 400-mile sale gained national exposure when it was featured on two cable television programs in the same week. In the early part of the event, Great American Country’s Endless Yard Sale, a competition show where two-person teams compete against each other in search of the best antique and vintage items. Small Town Big Deal, a syndicated documentary series focusing on stories in small town communities, also filmed along the yard sale route in 2015. Both shows filmed at various yard sale spots along the corridor from Cadiz to Bowling Green to Maysville.

== See also ==
- 127 Corridor Sale, the world's longest yard sale along US 127
- Roller Coaster Fair, held in October along KY 63 and KY 90
- U.S. Route 68
