= Bugtussle, Kentucky =

Unincorporated community in Kentucky, United States

- Unincorporated community
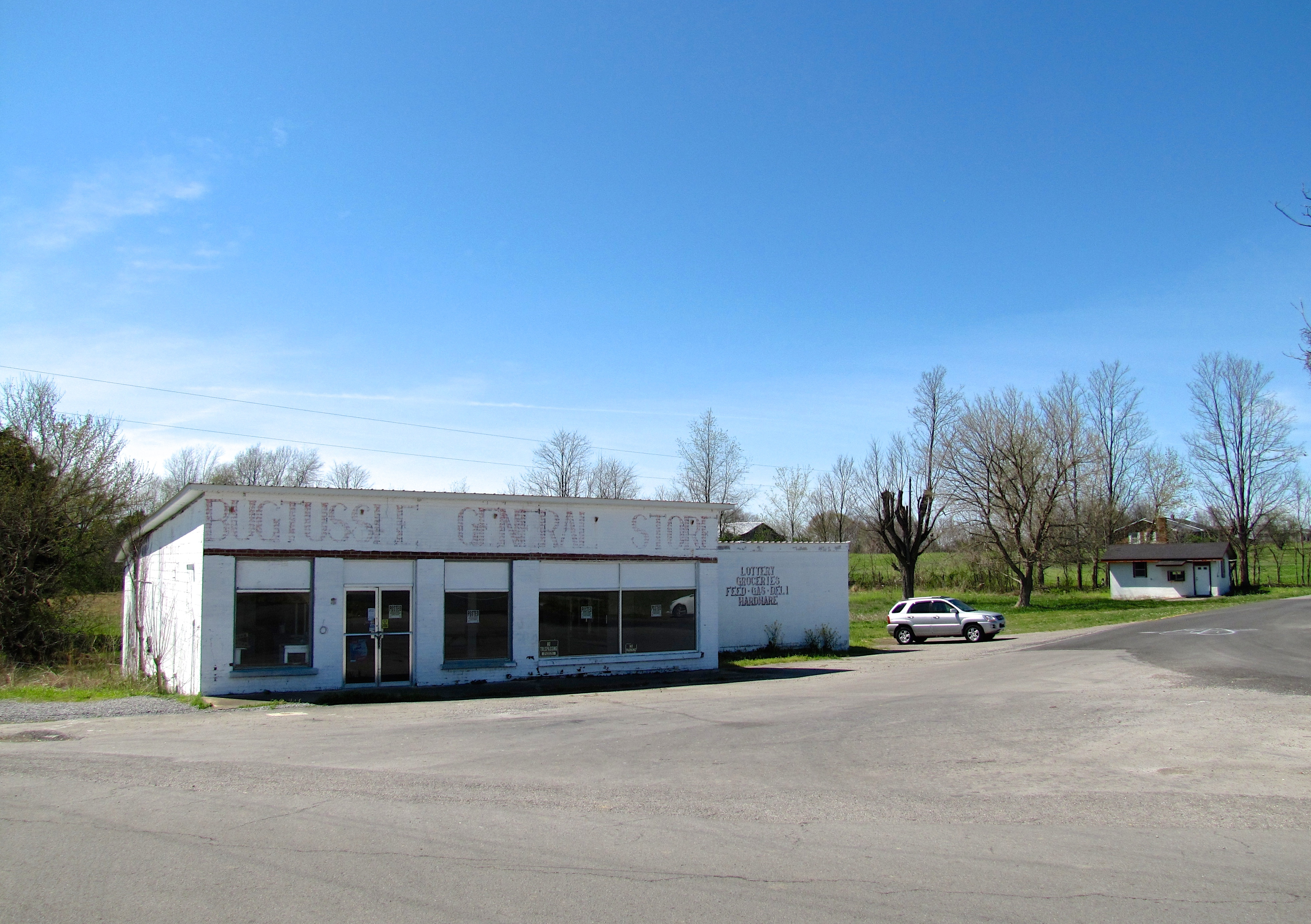
- The old Bugtussle General Store

- Location within Kentucky Location within the United States
- Coordinates: 36°37′33″N 85°52′33″W
- Country: United States
- State: Kentucky
- County: Monroe
- Elevation: 866 ft (264 m)
- Time zone: UTC-6 (Central (CST))
  - Summer (DST): UTC-5 (CDT)
- GNIS feature ID: 507615

Bugtussle is an unincorporated community in Monroe County, Kentucky, United States. It is located in the southern part of the county, immediately north of the Kentucky-Tennessee state line. Kentucky Route 382 (formerly part of Kentucky Route 87) connects the community with Gamaliel to the northeast and Lafayette, Tennessee, to the southwest; the highway becomes Tennessee State Route 261 across the state line.

== History ==
Bugtussle was so named due to the abundance of doodlebugs there. The community has been noted on lists of unusual place names.
