= Kentucky Route 980 =

State highway in Kentucky, United States

Kentucky Route 980
- Bowling Green Road
- KY 980 highlighted in red

Route information
- Maintained by KYTC
- Length: 1.303 mi (2.097 km)

Major junctions
- West end: US 231 / US 31E west of Scottsville
- North end: KY 100 in downtown Scottsville

Location
- Country: United States
- State: Kentucky
- Counties: Allen

Highway system
- Kentucky State Highway System; Interstate; US; State; Parkways
← KY 979	→ KY 981

Kentucky Route 980 (KY 980) is a 1.303 miles (2.097 km) long state highway located entirely in Allen County in south-central Kentucky. It originates at the junction with U.S. Route 231 and U.S. Route 31E on the west side of Scottsville, and ends in downtown Scottsville at a junction with Kentucky Route 100.

== History ==
KY 980 was originally part of U.S. 231 going into Scottsville. US 231 was rerouted onto the US 31E alignment west of town during the 1970s.

== Major intersections ==
The entire route is in Scottsville, Allen County.

mi	km	Destinations	Notes
0.000	0.000	US 31E (New Gallatin Road / New Glasgow Road) / US 231 (Bowling Green Road)	Western terminus; continues as US 231 north beyond US 31E / US 231 south
1.303	2.097	KY 100 (Gallatin Road)	Eastern terminus
1.000 mi = 1.609 km; 1.000 km = 0.621 mi
