= 127 Corridor Sale =

Outdoor second-hand sale

The Highway 127 Corridor Sale, also called the 127 Yard Sale, is an outdoor second-hand sale held annually for four days beginning the first Thursday in August along U.S. Route 127 (US 127). The event has been promoted as "The World's Longest Yard Sale."

== History ==
The original idea came from Fentress County, Tennessee, county executive Mike Walker, and was established in 1987. When it began, the sale route followed US 127 from Covington, Kentucky, to Chattanooga, Tennessee. A few years after the event was established, the Lookout Mountain Parkway was added to the route, extending it from Chattanooga southward through northwestern Georgia and northeastern Alabama to Gadsden. In 2006, the route was extended northward from Covington, through Ohio to the Michigan border, making its last major stops around Bryan, Ohio, and points northward. In 2010, the sale was extended northward to Hudson, Michigan. In 2012, it was extended again to five miles (8.0 km) north of Addison, Michigan, totaling an approximate end-to-end distance of 690 miles (1,110 km).

=== Southern extension of the yard sale route ===
The Lookout Mountain Parkway extension of the yard sale route through Alabama and Georgia includes the roadways listed below. In DeKalb County, Alabama:

- Tabor Road off Alabama State Route 211 (Noccalula Road) from Gadsden northeast to Collinsville
- Alabama State Route 176 from Collinsville to Dogtown, Alabama,
- DeKalb County CR 89 to Mentone, Alabama, and
- Alabama State Route 117 to the Georgia state line.

In Chatooga, Dade, and Walker Counties, Georgia:

- Georgia State Route 48 to the GA 157 junction in Cloudland, Georgia,
- Georgia State Route 157 north 23.2 miles (37.3 km) to the GA 136 junction,
- Georgia State Route 136 west to the GA 189 junction, and
- Georgia State Route 189 to the Tennessee state line on Lookout Mountain.

In southern Hamilton County, Tennessee:

- Tennessee State Route 148 in Lookout Mountain, and
- US 11 / US 41 / US 72 / SR 2 from the SR 148 junction to the Interstate 24 interchange in downtown Chattanooga.

=== Media ===
The event was featured on HGTV in 2006.

== See also ==
- 400-Mile Sale - annual yard sale along U.S. Route 68 in Kentucky
- Roller Coaster Fair
