= James House (Rogers, Arkansas) =

Historic house in Arkansas, United States

- U.S. National Register of Historic Places
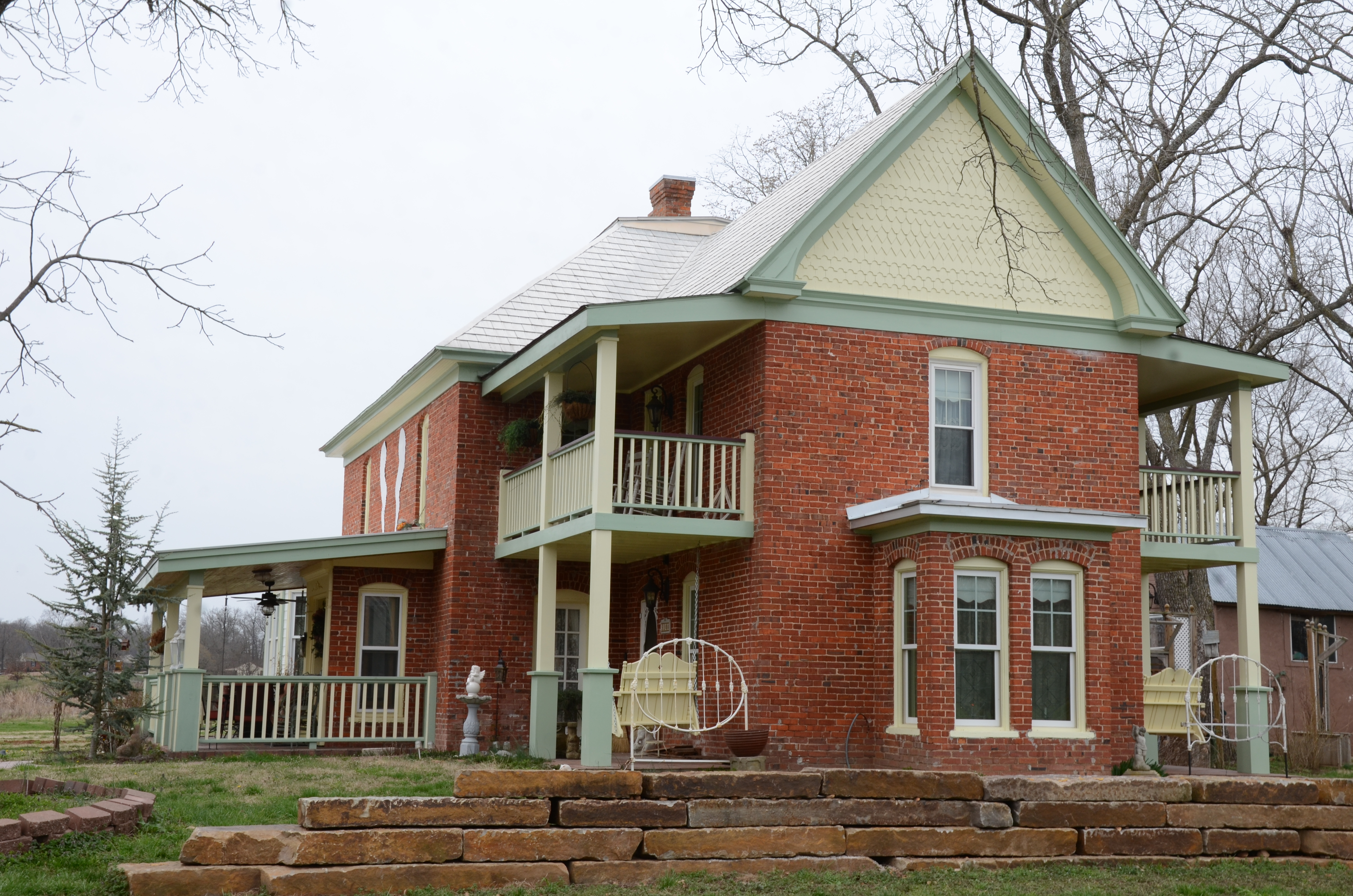

- Location within Arkansas Location within the United States
- Nearest city: Rogers, Arkansas
- Coordinates: 36.3077°N 94.2081°W
- Area: less than one acre
- Built: 1903
- Architectural style: Prow house
- MPS: Benton County MRA
- NRHP reference No.: 87002332
- Added to NRHP: January 28, 1988

The James House is a historic house on Benton County Route 51 (S. Rainbow Road), between Osage Creek and Sunbridge Lane outside Rogers, Arkansas. Built c. 1903, the house is a high-quality brick version of a locally distinctive architectural style known as a "Prow house". It is an American Foursquare two-story structure with a truncated pyramidal roof, with a gable-roofed section that projects forward, giving the house a T shape with the stem facing forward. The property also includes a combination smokehouse-root cellar, also built of brick, which appears to date to the same period, and is unique within the county.

The house was listed on the National Register of Historic Places in 1988.

== See also ==
- National Register of Historic Places listings in Benton County, Arkansas
