= Moss, Tennessee =

- Unincorporated community
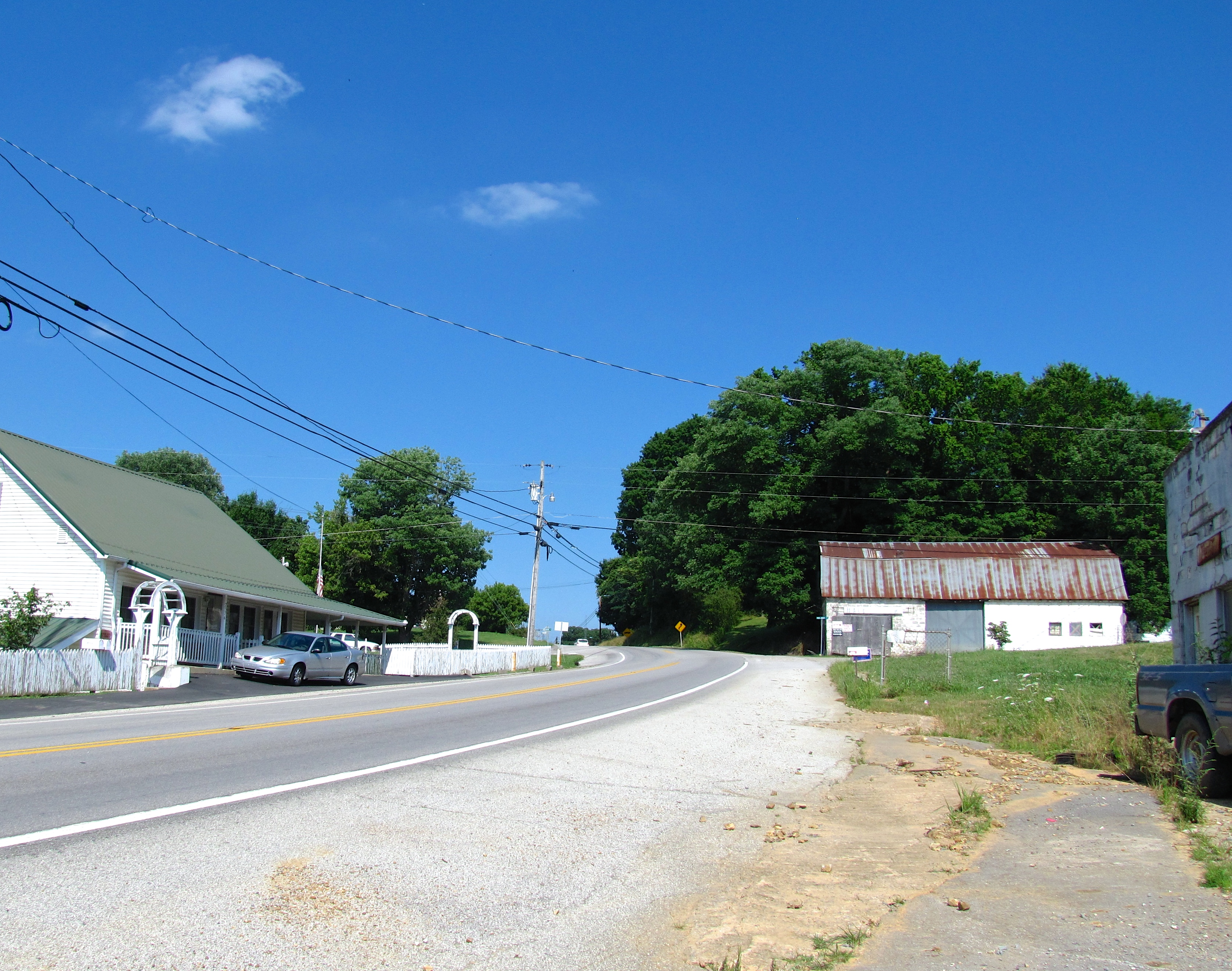
- SR 52 in Moss

- Location within Tennessee Location within the United States
- Coordinates: 36°35′21″N 85°37′01″W
- Country: United States
- State: Tennessee
- County: Clay
- Elevation: 1,112 ft (339 m)
- Time zone: UTC-6 (Central (CST))
  - Summer (DST): UTC-5 (CDT)
- ZIP code: 38575
- Area code: 931
- GNIS feature ID: 1294493

Moss is an unincorporated community in Clay County, Tennessee, United States.

== Geography ==
Moss is located 6.8 miles (10.9 km) west-northwest of Celina along Tennessee State Route 52. The highway's junction with Tennessee State Route 51, which connects the area to Tompkinsville, Kentucky, lies just west of the community.

== Post office ==
Moss has a post office with ZIP code 38575.
