= Providence, Simpson County, Kentucky =

Unincorporated community in Kentucky, United States

Providence
- Unincorporated community
- Location within the state of Kentucky Providence (the United States)
- Coordinates: 36°39′58″N 86°40′39″W
- Country: United States
- State: Kentucky
- County: Simpson
- Elevation: 735 ft (224 m)
- Time zone: UTC-6 (Central (CST))
  - Summer (DST): UTC-5 (CDT)
- GNIS feature ID: 501366

Providence is an unincorporated community in Simpson County, Kentucky, United States. It lies along Routes 383 and 591 southwest of the city of Franklin, the county seat of Simpson County. Its elevation is 735 feet (224 m). Residents of Providence typically attend public schools in Simpson County, which are administered by the Simpson County School District. The nearest schools are located in the city of Franklin.
