= Kentucky Route 1008 =

Highway in South Central Kentucky

Kentucky Route 1008
- KY 1008 highlighted in red

Route information
- Maintained by KYTC
- Length: 6.526 mi (10.503 km)

Major junctions
- West/South end: KY 100 west of Franklin
- see article
- East/North end: US 31W north of Franklin

Location
- Country: United States
- State: Kentucky
- Counties: Simpson

Highway system
- Kentucky State Highway System; Interstate; US; State; Parkways
← KY 1007	→ KY 1009

Kentucky Route 1008 (KY 1008) is a secondary state highway located entirely in Simpson County in south-central Kentucky. It is basically a beltway around the county seat of Franklin as it goes almost completely around the city.

== Intersections ==
The entire route is in Franklin, Simpson County.

mi	km	Destinations	Notes
0.000	0.000	KY 100 (Russellville Road) – Russellville, Franklin	Western/Southern terminus; begin overlap of KY 100 Truck
0.586	0.943	KY 383 – Franklin Business District, Orlinda, Springfield	
1.32	2.12	KY 2593	
2.276	3.663	US 31W (Nashville Road) to I-65 – Portland, Nashville	
3.418	5.501	KY 100 (Scottsville Road) to I-65 – Scottsville, Franklin Business District	End concurrency with KY 100 Truck
3.688	5.935	KY 73 – Kenny Perry's Country Creek Golf Course	
5.164	8.311	KY 1171 (Blackjack Road)	
6.526	10.503	US 31W (Bowling Green Road) – Bowling Green, Woodburn, Franklin	Eastern/Northern terminus
1.000 mi = 1.609 km; 1.000 km = 0.621 mi
