= Old Mulkey Meetinghouse =

Historic meetinghouse in Kentucky, United States

- U.S. National Register of Historic Places
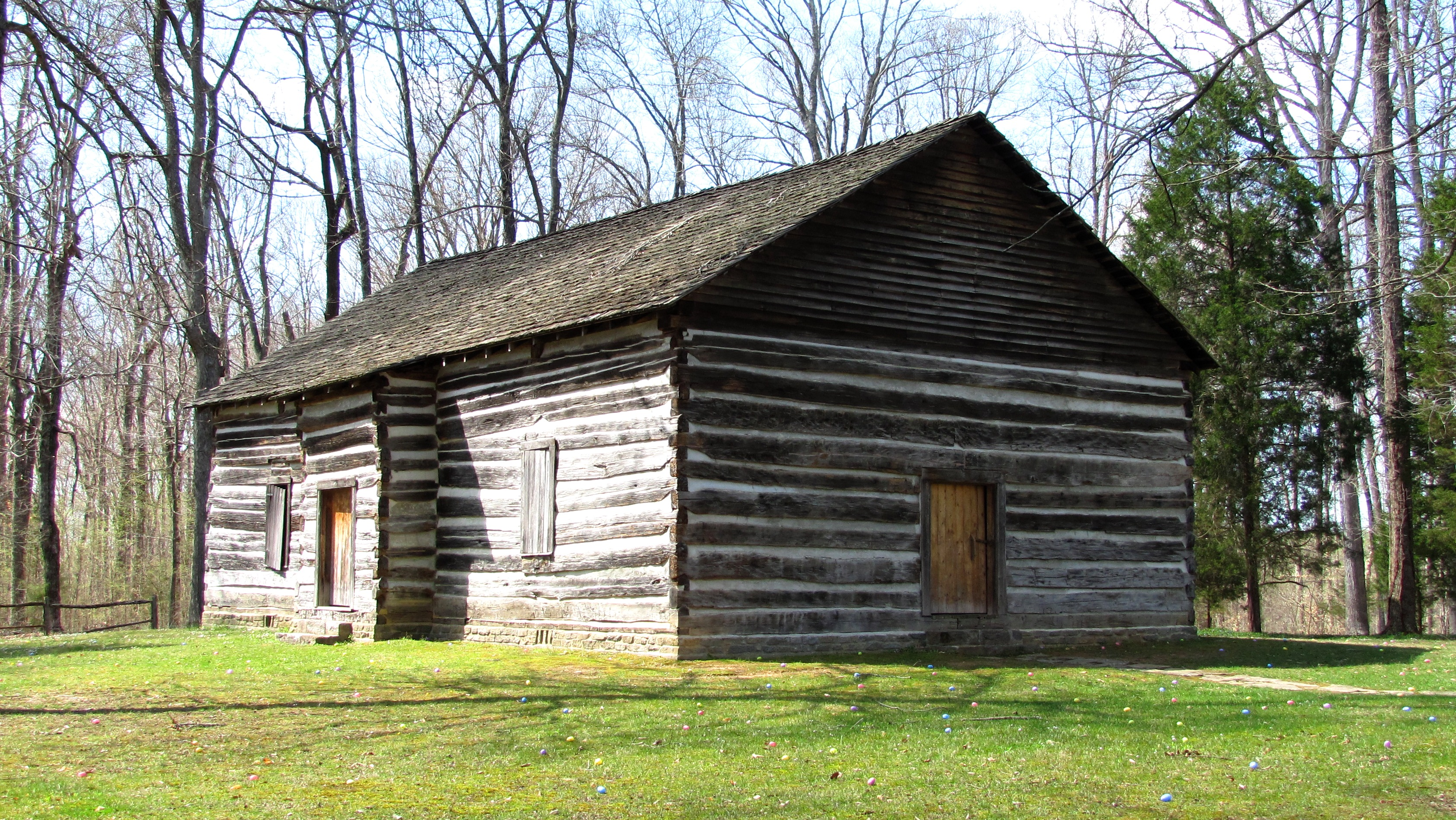

- Location within Kentucky Location within the United States
- Nearest city: Tompkinsville, Kentucky
- Coordinates: 36°40′40″N 85°42′27″W
- Area: 5 acres (2.0 ha)
- Built: 1804
- NRHP reference No.: 73000821
- Added to NRHP: May 7, 1973

The Old Mulkey Meetinghouse, also known as Mill Creek Baptist Church, is a historic church built in 1804 in Tompkinsville, Kentucky. It was added to the National Register of Historic Places in 1973. It is part of the Old Mulkey Meetinghouse State Historic Site.

It is "significant both as one of Kentucky's earliest log churches and for its unusual construction features - its twelve-sided construction and its lack of a fireplace."
