= Kentucky Route 73 =

State highway in Kentucky, United States

Kentucky Route 73
- KY 73 highlighted in red

Route information
- Maintained by KYTC
- Length: 30.031 mi (48.330 km)

Major junctions
- South end: White Road at Kentucky—Tennessee state line
- US 31W / KY 100 in Franklin; US 68 / KY 80 near South Union
- North end: KY 1038 in rural Logan Co

Location
- Country: United States
- State: Kentucky
- Counties: Simpson, Logan

Highway system
- Kentucky State Highway System; Interstate; US; State; Parkways
← KY 72	→ KY 74

Kentucky Route 73 (KY 73) is a 30.031-mile-long (48.330 km) state highway in Kentucky that runs from the Kentucky—Tennessee state line southeast of Franklin to Kentucky Route 1038 northwest of South Union in rural Logan County via Franklin.

== History ==
An earlier KY 73 ran from Horse Cave to the Tennessee border. This became part of US 31W when it was rerouted in 1931. The current KY 73 was formed in 1932.

== Major intersections ==
County	Location	mi	km	Destinations	Notes
Simpson		0.000	0.000	White Road (continuation)	Southern terminus
Simpson	Franklin	7.169	11.537	KY 100 (Scottsville Road)	
Simpson		7.221	11.621	KY 585 east (Gold City Road)	Western terminus of KY 585
Simpson	Franklin	8.228	13.242	KY 1008 (Robey Street)	
Simpson	Franklin	9.234	14.861	US 31W south (South Main Street) / KY 100 (West Cedar Street)	South end of US 31W overlap
Simpson	Franklin	9.741	15.677	KY 1171 north (North Street) / Roosevelt Street	Southern terminus of KY 1171
Simpson	Franklin	9.866	15.878	US 31W north (North Main Street)	North end of US 31W overlap
Simpson		11.212	18.044	KY 2592 east (Patton Road)	Western terminus of KY 2592
Simpson		11.942	19.219	KY 1170 west (Turnertown Road)	Eastern terminus of KY 1170
Simpson		16.839	27.100	KY 621 west (Pilot Knob Road)	South end of KY 621 overlap
Simpson		17.640	28.389	KY 621 east (Stevenson Road)	North end of KY 621 overlap
Simpson		18.371	29.565	KY 2349 north (Hardison Road) / Albert Elliott Road	Southern terminus of KY 2349
Simpson		20.789	33.457	KY 2591 south (Flat Rock Road)	Northern terminus of KY 2591
Logan		21.699	34.921	KY 3172 east (Shaker Museum Road) / Pleasant View Road	Western terminus of KY 3172
Logan		21.936	35.303	US 68 / KY 80	
Logan		22.551	36.292	KY 1466 north (Taylor Borrow Road)	Southern terminus of KY 1466
Logan		30.031	48.330	KY 1038 (Bucksville Road)	Northern terminus
1.000 mi = 1.609 km; 1.000 km = 0.621 mi
