= Sanders-Hollabaugh House =

Historic house in Arkansas, United States

- U.S. National Register of Historic Places
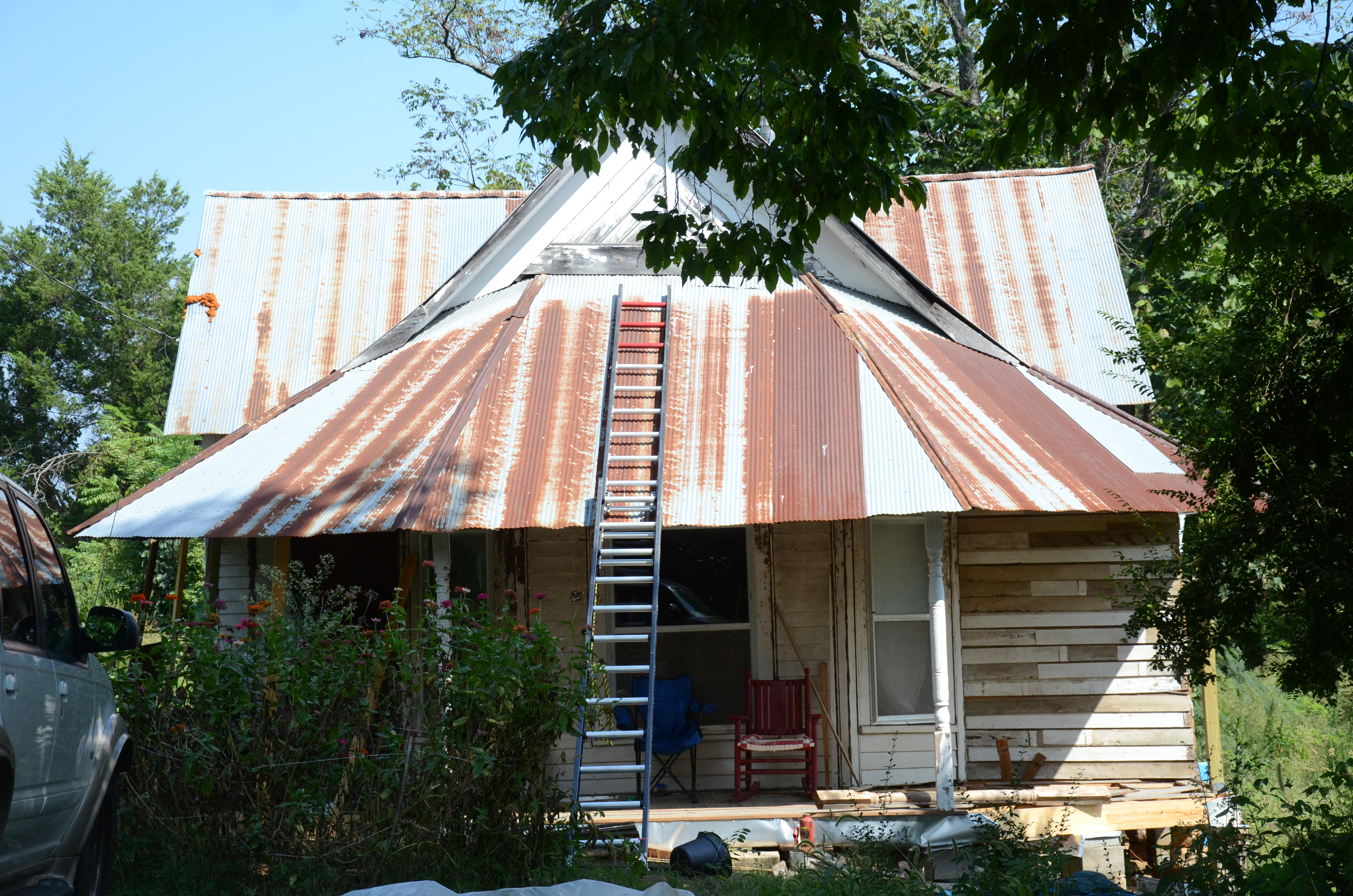

- Location within Arkansas Location within the United States
- Location: Church St., Marshall, Arkansas
- Coordinates: 35°54′39″N 92°37′47″W
- Area: less than one acre
- Built: 1903
- Architect: Noel Watts, Garrison Watts
- Architectural style: Prow house
- MPS: Searcy County MPS
- NRHP reference No.: 93000976
- Added to NRHP: October 4, 1993

The Sanders-Hollabaugh House is a historic house on Church Street in Marshall, Arkansas. It is a single story wood-frame structure, built in a T shape with a shed-roof porch extending around the base of the T. Built in 1903, it is the best local example of a prow house, in which the base of the T projects forward. The house was built on what was then known as the Bratton Addition, a relatively new subdivision in the city, and has long been owned by the Hollabaugh family.

The house was listed on the National Register of Historic Places in 1993.

== See also ==
- National Register of Historic Places listings in Searcy County, Arkansas
