= Lillard-Sprague House =

Historic house in Arkansas, United States

- Lillard-Sprague House (Destroyed)
- Formerly listed on the U.S. National Register of Historic Places
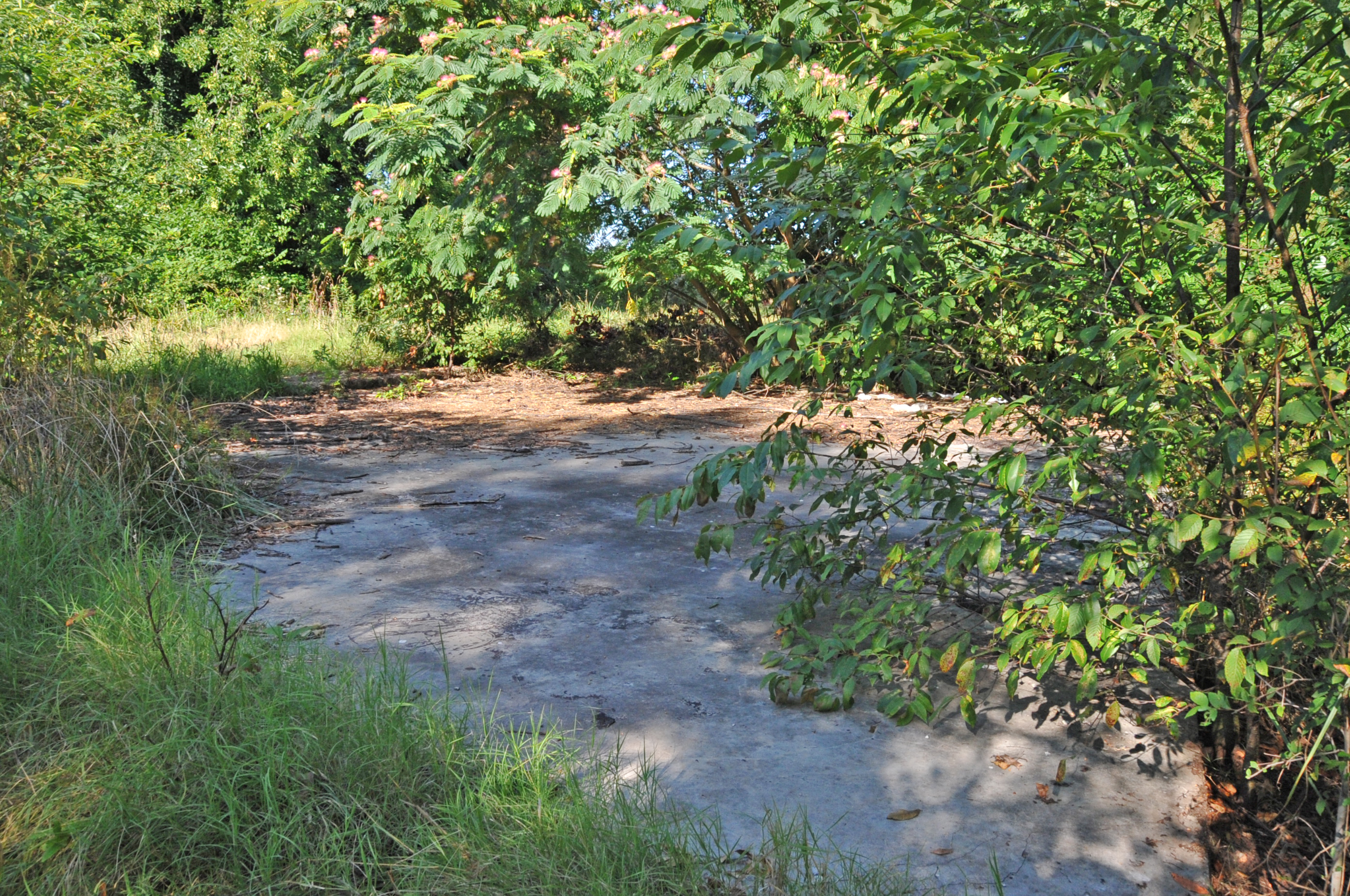
- The house appears to have been destroyed (2015)

- Location within Arkansas Location within the United States
- Location: Pleasant Grove Rd., Rogers, Arkansas
- Coordinates: 36°17′22″N 94°11′21″W
- Area: less than one acre
- Built: 1907
- Built by: R.E. Lillard
- Architectural style: Prow house
- MPS: Benton County MRA
- NRHP reference No.: 87002398

Significant dates
- Added to NRHP: January 28, 1988
- Removed from NRHP: October 7, 2026

The Lillard-Sprague House was a historic house on Pleasant Grove Street in Rogers, Arkansas. Built in 1907, it was a wood-frame example of a prow house, a local style with T-shaped layout where the stem of the T projects forward. In this instance, the projecting section was surrounded by a single-story wraparound porch, supported by Tuscan columns on stone piers. An addition had been added to the center rear, retaining the house's axial symmetry.

The house was listed on the National Register of Historic Places in 1988, but has since been destroyed.

== See also ==
- National Register of Historic Places listings in Benton County, Arkansas
