= Gamaliel, Kentucky =

- City
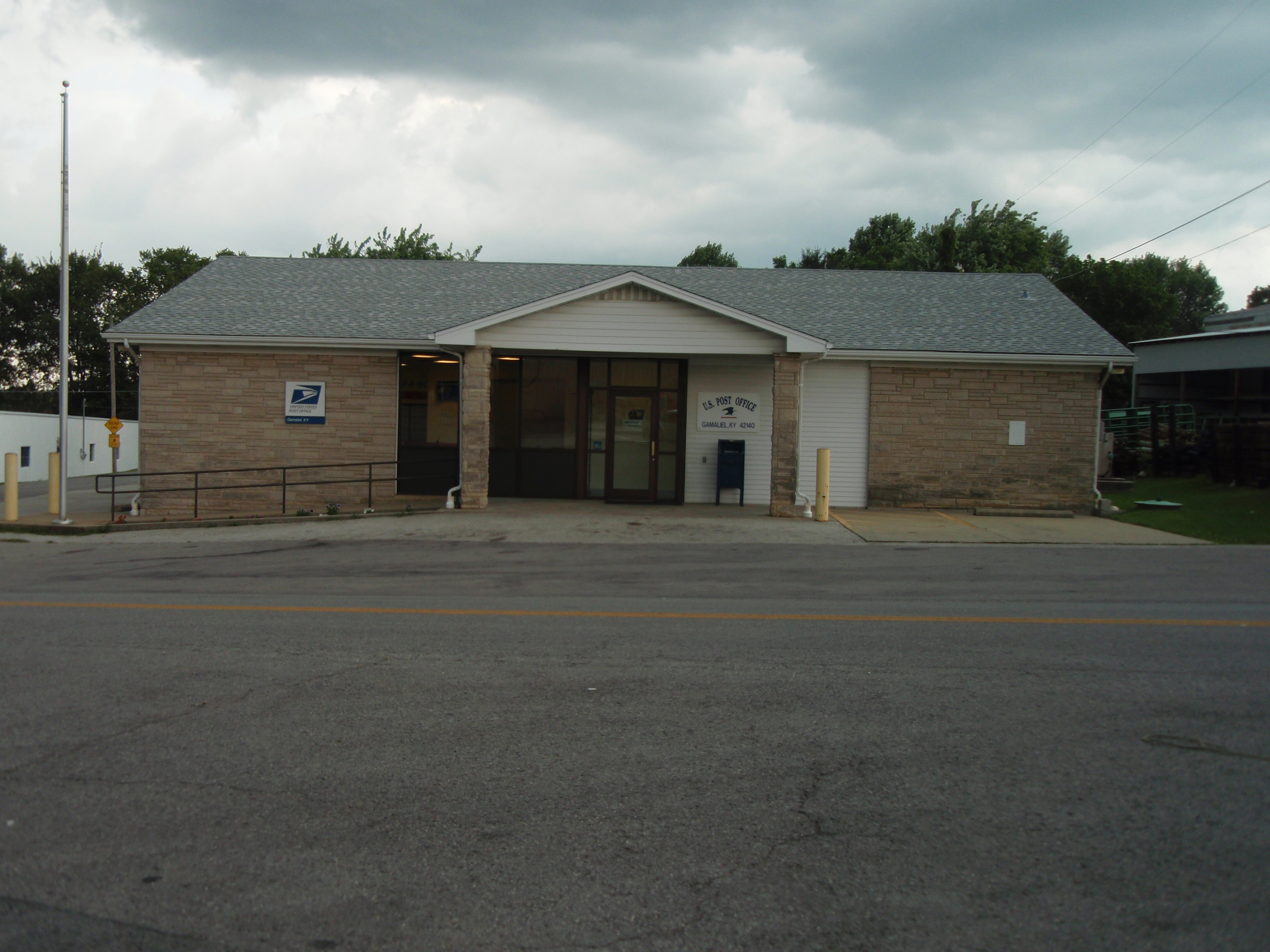
- Gamaliel Post office

- Location in Monroe County, Kentucky
- Coordinates: 36°38′24″N 85°47′36″W
- Country: United States
- State: Kentucky
- County: Monroe
- Named for: 1st-century Jewish leader

Area
  - Total: 0.57 sq mi (1.48 km^{2})
  - Land: 0.57 sq mi (1.47 km^{2})
  - Water: 0.0039 sq mi (0.01 km^{2})
- Elevation: 843 ft (257 m)

Population (2020)
  - Total: 391
  - Density: 690.3/sq mi (266.54/km^{2})
- Time zone: UTC-6 (Central (CST))
  - Summer (DST): UTC-5 (CDT)
- ZIP code: 42140
- Area code: 270
- FIPS code: 21-29872
- GNIS feature ID: 0492661

Gamaliel (/ɡəˈmeɪliəl/) is a home rule-class city in Monroe County, Kentucky, in the United States. The population was 391 at the 2020 census.

== History ==
Around 1836, James Crawford and John Hayes saw that a town was springing up and donated 10 acres (4.0 ha) of land, at a point where their farms met, to be used for educational and religious purposes. On this property, a building was erected and used for school and church and, in 1844, a cemetery was added. In making the grant, the two men stipulated that seven trustees should be appointed to administer the property along the lines provided by the donors. The original trustees were William Crawford, Maston Comer, John Hayes, Robert Welch, James Crawford Jr., Charles Browning Jr., and John Meador. This act of incorporation was passed by the General Assembly of the Commonwealth of Kentucky on December 19, 1840.

Samuel DeWitt, a local preacher and teacher, said "Gamaliel" was a good biblical name for a good village. (In the Book of Acts, the Pharisee appears speaking in favor of recently arrested Christians.) The town took the name that he suggested. A post office was established in the community in 1870.

== Geography ==
Gamaliel is located in southern Monroe County at 36°38′24″N 85°47′36″W (36.639956, -85.793372). It is 1 mile (1.6 km) north of the Tennessee border. Kentucky Route 100 passes through the center of town, leading northeast 8 miles (13 km) to Tompkinsville, the county seat, and northwest 13 miles (21 km) to Fountain Run. Kentucky Route 63 leaves town to the northeast with KY 100 but leads south from town to the state line, where it becomes Tennessee State Route 56, which continues to Red Boiling Springs, 9 miles (14 km) south of Gamaliel. Kentucky Route 87 leads southwest 6 miles (10 km) from Gamaliel to Bugtussle at the state line, then 13 miles (21 km) farther as Tennessee State Route 261 to Lafayette, Tennessee.

According to the United States Census Bureau, Gamaliel has a total area of 0.81 square miles (2.1 km^{2}), of which 0.004 square miles (0.010 km^{2}), or 0.49%, are water. The city sits on a hill between the East Fork of the Barren River to the north and its tributary Line Creek to the south. The Barren River is part of the Green River watershed leading to the Ohio River.

== Demographics ==
Historical population
Census	Pop.	Note	%±
1960	868		—
1970	431		−50.3%
1980	456		5.8%
1990	462		1.3%
2000	439		−5.0%
2010	376		−14.4%
2020	391		4.0%
U.S. Decennial Census

As of the census of 2000, there were 439 people, 196 households, and 129 families residing in the city. The population density was 520.4 inhabitants per square mile (200.9/km^{2}). There were 213 housing units at an average density of 252.5 per square mile (97.5/km^{2}). The racial makeup of the city was 97.95% White, 0.46% Native American, 1.37% from other races, and 0.23% from two or more races. Hispanic or Latino of any race were 1.59% of the population.

There were 196 households, out of which 26.5% had children under the age of 18 living with them, 53.1% were married couples living together, 9.2% had a female householder with no husband present, and 33.7% were non-families. 32.1% of all households were made up of individuals, and 20.4% had someone living alone who was 65 years of age or older. The average household size was 2.24 and the average family size was 2.79.

In the city, the population was spread out, with 21.4% under the age of 18, 6.6% from 18 to 24, 26.0% from 25 to 44, 26.0% from 45 to 64, and 20.0% who were 65 years of age or older. The median age was 42 years. For every 100 females, there were 86.0 males. For every 100 females age 18 and over, there were 79.7 males.

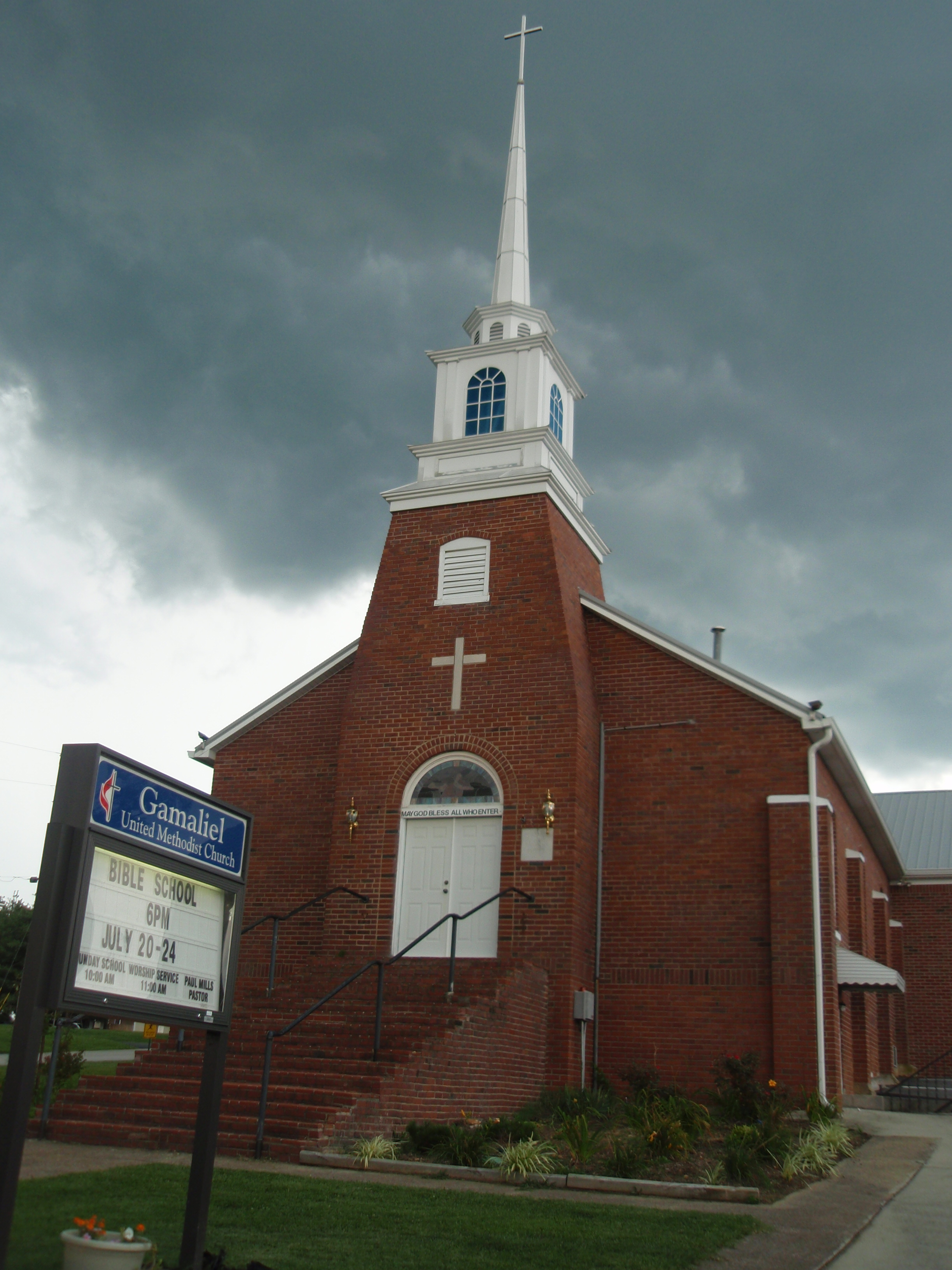
Gamaliel United Methodist Church

The median income for a household in the city was $23,833, and the median income for a family was $29,000. Males had a median income of $22,167 versus $16,083 for females. The per capita income for the city was $12,940. About 11.2% of families and 12.1% of the population were below the poverty line, including 9.8% of those under age 18 and 12.5% of those age 65 or over.

== Climate ==
The climate in this area is characterized by hot, humid summers and generally mild to cool winters. According to the Köppen Climate Classification system, Gamaliel has a humid subtropical climate, abbreviated "Cfa" on climate maps.
