= Mercure Liverpool Atlantic Tower Hotel =

Hotel in Liverpool, England

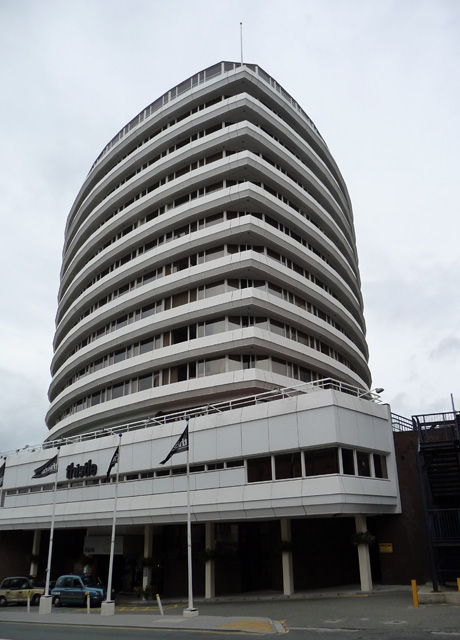
- Mercure Liverpool Atlantic Tower Hotel
- Interactive map of the Mercure Liverpool Atlantic Tower Hotel area

General information
- Location: Liverpool, England, United Kingdom
- Coordinates: 53°24′27″N 02°59′43″W
- Owner: Amaris Hospitality
- Management: Accor Hotels (Mercure)

Technical details
- Floor count: 13

Other information
- Number of rooms: 225
- Number of suites: 6
- Number of restaurants: 1
- Parking: 56 spaces located on Rumford Place

Website
- mercure.com

The Mercure Liverpool Atlantic Tower Hotel (previously known as Atlantic Tower Hotel (The Hotel Collection), Thistle Liverpool, Thistle Atlantic Tower or the Thistle Hotel) is a large 4-star hotel located in Liverpool, England. Opened in 1972, it is situated on Chapel Street next to Saint Nicholas' Church and near the Royal Liver Building on the city's famous Pier Head. The building was designed to resemble the prow of a ship to reflect Liverpool's maritime history.

== Gallery ==
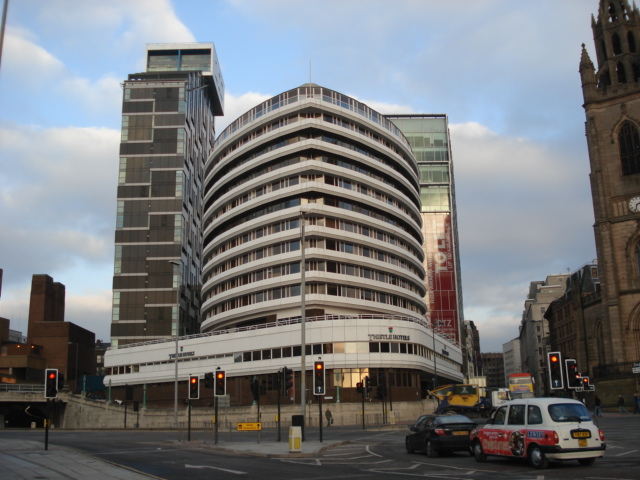
The Thistle Atlantic Tower

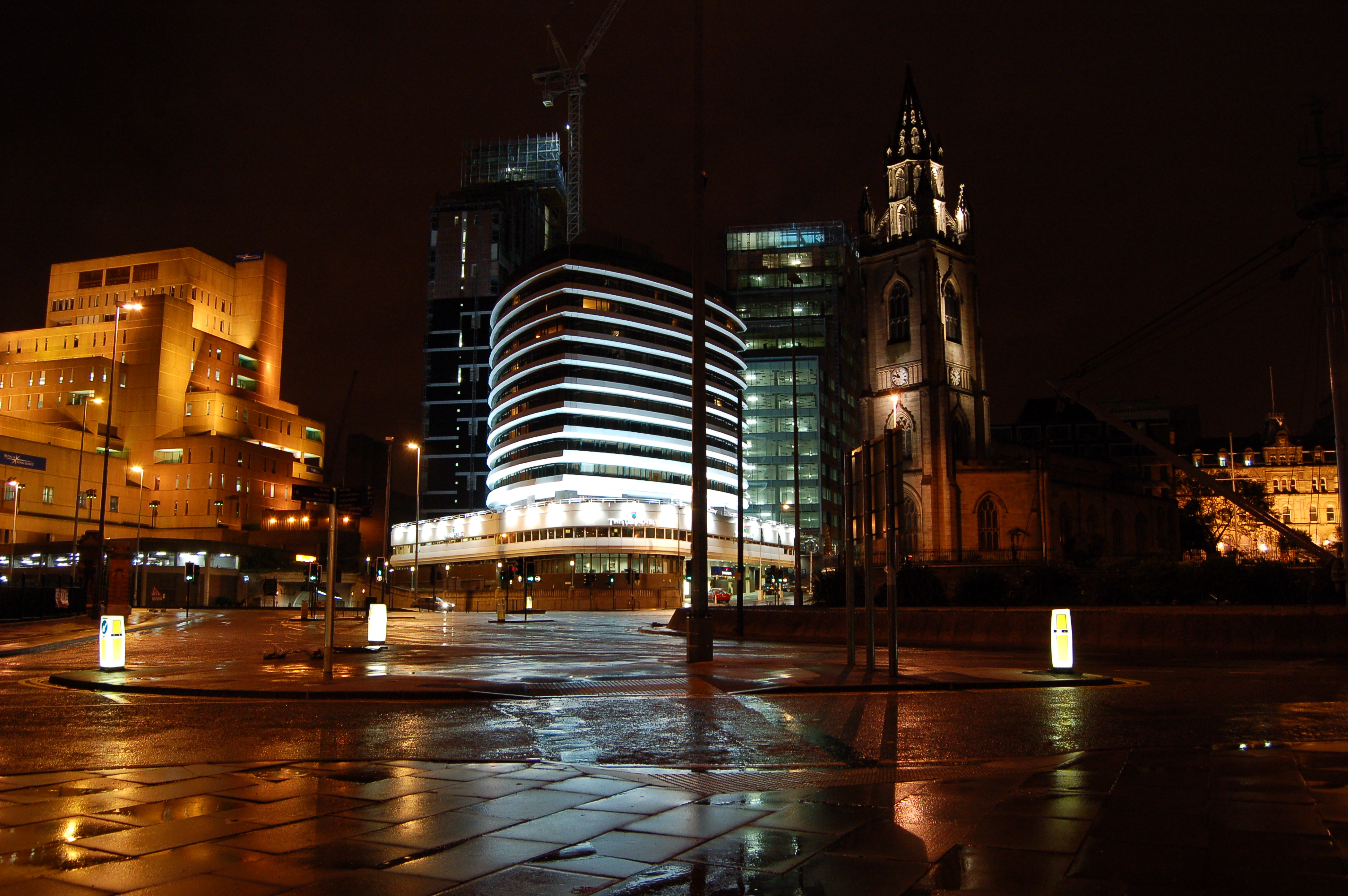
The hotel at night, Saint Nicholas' Church can be seen to the right

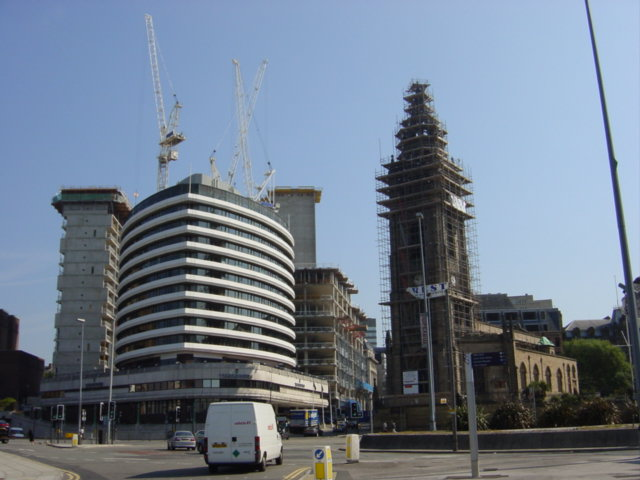
The hotel with the Unity Buildings under-construction behind it

== See also ==
- Architecture of Liverpool
- Thistle Hotels
