= Old Mulkey Meetinghouse State Historic Site =

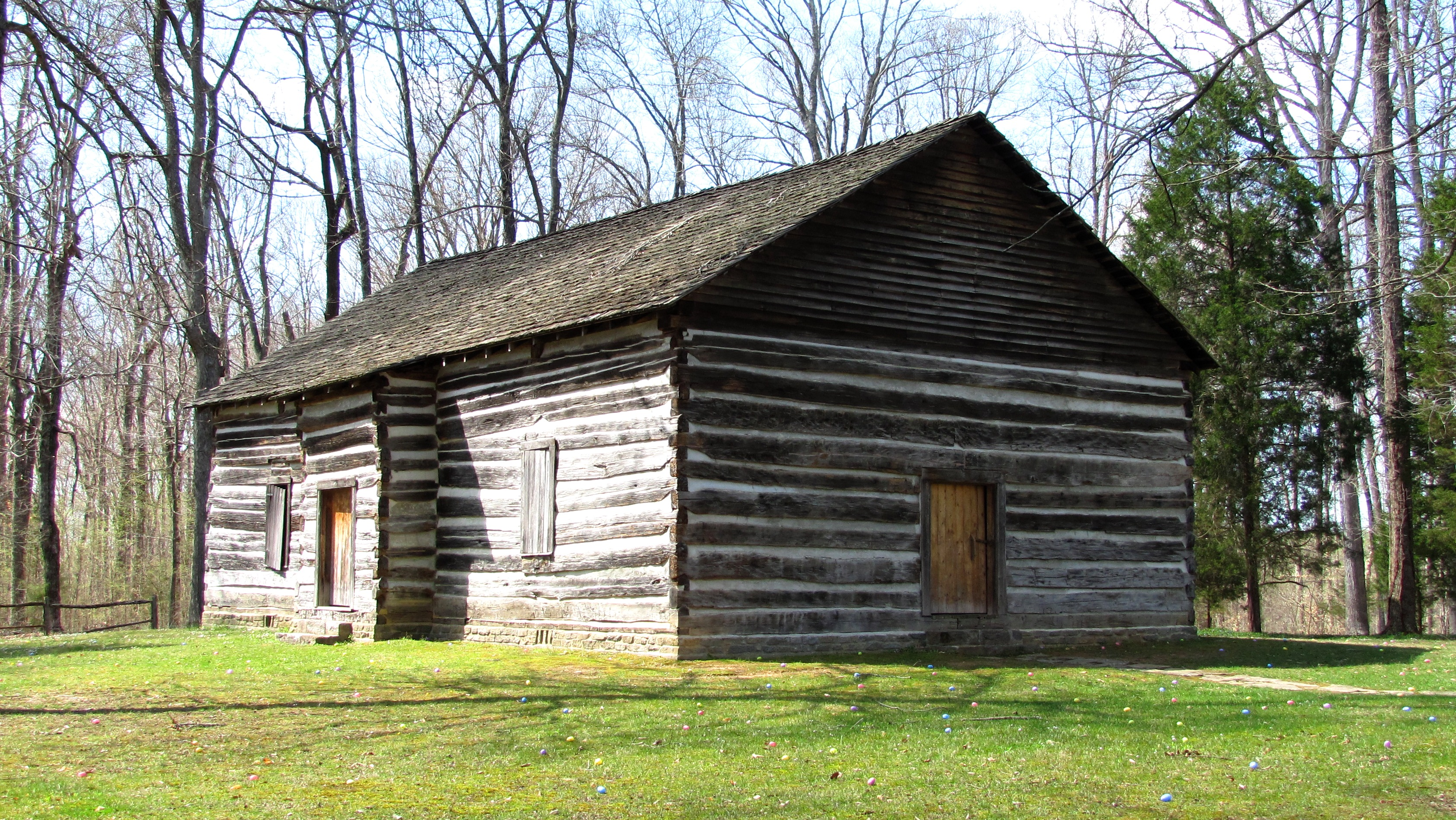

- Location within Kentucky Location within the United States
- Location: Monroe County, Kentucky, United States
- Coordinates: 36°40′40″N 85°42′27″W
- Area: 20 acres (8.1 ha)
- Elevation: 804 ft (245 m)
- Established: 1931
- Administrator: Kentucky Department of Parks
- Website: Official website

Old Mulkey Meetinghouse State Historic Site is a 20-acre (8.1 ha) park in Monroe County, Kentucky. It features the Old Mulkey Meetinghouse, a Baptist church built around the turn of the 19th century, and its adjacent cemetery. The site became part of the park system in 1931.

The oldest log meetinghouse in Kentucky, it was built in 1804 during a period of religious revival. Many Revolutionary War soldiers and pioneers, including Daniel Boone's sister, Hannah, are buried there. The structure has twelve corners in the shape of a cross and three doors, symbolic of the Holy Trinity. The Old Mulkey Church, originally called the Mill Creek Baptist Church, was established by a small band of pioneer Baptists from North and South Carolina and led by Philip Mulkey.
