= Tennessee State Route 51 =

State highway in Clay County, Tennessee, United States

State Route 51
- Tompkinsville Highway
- SR 51 mainline in red

Route information
- Maintained by TDOT
- Length: 1.9 mi (3.1 km)
- Existed: October 1, 1923–present

Major junctions
- South end: SR 52 in Moss
- North end: KY 163 at the Kentucky state line near Moss

Location
- Country: United States
- State: Tennessee
- Counties: Clay

Highway system
- Tennessee State Routes; Interstate; US; State
← US 51	→ SR 52

State Route 51 (SR 51) is a rural secondary north–south state highway that traverses the northwestern portion of Clay County in Middle Tennessee. It is 1.9 miles (3.1 km) long.

== Route description ==
SR 51 begins at a Y-intersection with SR 52 (Clay County Highway) at Moss. Its northern end is located at the Kentucky state line where it becomes Kentucky Route 163 (KY 163) upon entry into Monroe County, Kentucky. SR 51 is known as “Tompkinsville Highway” for its entire length.

== Major intersections ==
The entire route is in Clay County.

Location	mi	km	Destinations	Notes
Moss	0.0	0.0	SR 52 (Clay County Highway) – Celina, Nashville	Southern terminus
	1.9	3.1	KY 163 north – Tompkinsville	Northern terminus; Kentucky state line
1.000 mi = 1.609 km; 1.000 km = 0.621 mi
