= Mount Hermon, Kentucky =

Unincorporated community in Kentucky, United States

- Unincorporated community
- Location within Kentucky Location within the United States
- Coordinates: 36°48′24″N 85°49′15″W
- Country: United States
- State: Kentucky
- County: Monroe
- Elevation: 978 ft (298 m)
- Time zone: UTC-6 (Central (CST))
  - Summer (DST): UTC-5 (CDT)
- ZIP codes: 42157
- GNIS feature ID: 498747

Mount Hermon is an unincorporated community in Monroe County, Kentucky, United States.
