= Kentucky Route 163 =

State highway in Kentucky

Kentucky Route 163

Route information
- Maintained by KYTC
- Length: 29.823 mi (47.995 km)

Major junctions
- South end: SR 51 at the Tennessee State Line south of Hestand
- KY 100 in Tompkinsville; KY 90 at Beaumont
- North end: US 68 / KY 80 / East Stockton Street in Edmonton

Location
- Country: United States
- State: Kentucky
- Counties: Monroe, Metcalfe

Highway system
- Kentucky State Highway System; Interstate; US; State; Parkways
← KY 162	→ KY 164

Kentucky Route 163 (KY 163) is a 29.823-mile-long (47.995 km) state highway that traverses through two counties in south-central Kentucky. It runs from Tennessee State Route 51 at the Kentucky-Tennessee border south of Hestand to U.S. Route 68, Kentucky Route 80, and East Stockton Street in Edmonton via Tompkinsville.

== Route description ==
The highway starts at the Tennessee state line in southern Monroe County on the road where going south, it continues as Tennessee State Route 51. KY 163 then heads southeast passing through Hestand before reaching the city of Tompkinsville, where it meets KY 100 and KY 63. KY 163 then enters Metcalfe County, and crosses KY 90 at Beaumont. KY 163 ends in the city of Edmonton at an intersection with U.S. Route 68 (US 68) and KY 80. Since the route of KY 163 was moved in 2020 to the 3.8 mile Tompkinsville Bypass, KY 375 acts as a 3.3 mile alternate route of KY 163 in downtown Tompkinsville, as the north and south endpoints are at KY 163.

Since 2002, the first 8.5 miles (13.7 km) of KY 163, along with the entire Tennessee Route 51 corridor, and several other routes, is part of the designated route of the annual Roller Coaster Yard Sale, an outdoor second-hand yard sale event that takes place in the first weekend of October. The specified section of KY 163 is also part of the Cordell Hull Scenic Byway, one of Kentucky's Scenic Byway routes.

== History ==
In addition to KY 163's current alignment through Monroe and southern Metcalfe Counties, KY 163 ran an additional 10 miles (16 km) to end at a junction with KY 70, another major state route, at Sulphur Well. KY 70 alone went northward to Greensburg (Green County) and Campbellsville (Taylor County) at that point. KY 163's northern terminus was relocated to its current location when US 68 was rerouted onto this route during the 1940s. Since then, KY 70 ran concurrent with US 68 all the way to Campbellsville.

== Major intersections ==
County	Location	mi	km	Destinations	Notes
Monroe		0.000	0.000	SR 51 south (Tompkinsville Highway)	Southern terminus at state line
Monroe	Hestand	3.227	5.193	KY 216 east (Vernon Road)	Western terminus of KY 216
Monroe		6.153	9.902	KY 3144 west (Capp Harlan Road)	Eastern terminus of KY 144
Monroe	Tompkinsville	7.064	11.368	KY 375 north (Celina Road)	Southern terminus of KY 375; southern end of Tompkinsville bypass route
Monroe	Tompkinsville	7.763	12.493	KY 3144 east (Capp Harlan Road)	Western terminus of KY 3144
Monroe	Tompkinsville	9.088	14.626	KY 100 (Center Point Road)	
Monroe	Tompkinsville	10.022	16.129	KY 1049 (Radio Station Road)	
Monroe	Tompkinsville	10.842	17.449	KY 375 south (Edmonton Road)	Northern terminus of KY 375; northern end of bypass route
Monroe		11.656	18.759	KY 2768 west (Old Edmonton Road)	Eastern terminus of KY 2768
Monroe		15.302	24.626	KY 1049 south (Radio Station Road)	Northern terminus of KY 1049
Monroe		16.994	27.349	KY 678 west (Homer Bartley Road)	Eastern terminus of KY 678
Metcalfe		20.792	33.461	KY 1520 south (Roy Lee Humes Road) / Roy Lee Humes Road	Northern terminus of KY 1520
Metcalfe		21.510	34.617	KY 90 (Summer Shade Road)	
Metcalfe	Edmonton	29.753	47.883	KY 496 south (East Hamilton Street) / West Hamilton Street	Northern terminus of KY 496
Metcalfe	Edmonton	29.823	47.995	US 68 / KY 80 (West Stockton Street / North Main Street) to Cumberland Expressway / Stockton Street – Columbia, Glasgow	Northern terminus
1.000 mi = 1.609 km; 1.000 km = 0.621 mi: Concurrency terminus
