= Kentucky Route 383 =

State highway in Kentucky, United States

Kentucky Route 383
- KY 383 highlighted in red

Route information
- Maintained by KYTC
- Length: 9.513 mi (15.310 km)

Major junctions
- South end: SR 49 at the Tennessee state line southwest of Providence
- KY 591 near Providence; KY 664 near Franklin; KY 816 southwest of Franklin
- North end: US 31W in Franklin

Location
- Country: United States
- State: Kentucky
- Counties: Simpson

Highway system
- Kentucky State Highway System; Interstate; US; State; Parkways
← KY 382	→ KY 384

Kentucky Route 383 (KY 383) is a 9.513-mile-long (15.310 km) state highway in the U.S. state of Kentucky. The highway connects mostly rural areas of Simpson County with Franklin.

== Route description ==
KY 383 begins at the Tennessee state line in the southwestern part of Simpson County, where the roadway continues as Tennessee State Route 49. It travels to the north-northeast and crosses over the Red River. It curves to the northeast and has an intersection with the eastern terminus of KY 591 (Adairville Road). It then curves to the east-northeast and travels through Providence. It curves back to the northeast and temporarily parallels Neely Branch before curving to the east-northeast and crossing over the branch. It curves to the north-northeast and intersects the eastern terminus of KY 664 (Sulphur Springs Church Road). The highway heads to the east and intersects the northern terminus of KY 816 (Schweizer Road). It travels to the northeast and enters Franklin. After intersecting KY 1008 (McLendon Road / Bluegrass Road), it travels just to the west of Franklin–Simpson High School. It curves to the east-southeast and meets its northern terminus, an intersection with U.S. Route 31W (South Main Street). Here, the roadway continues as East Madison Street.

== History ==
KY 383 was formed in 1944 as a renumbering of KY 79 because of US 79.

The original KY 383 ran from US 42 in Beaverlick west and north to Rabbit Hash; this became part of KY 338 when it was extended west.

== Major intersections ==
The entire route is in Simpson County.

Location	mi	km	Destinations	Notes
Tennessee state line	0.000	0.000	SR 49 south – Orlinda	Southern terminus
	1.114	1.793	KY 591 west (Adairville Road)	Eastern terminus of KY 591
	5.959	9.590	KY 664 west (Sulphur Springs Church Road)	Eastern terminus of KY 664
	7.378	11.874	KY 816 south (Schweizer Road)	Northern terminus of KY 816
Franklin	8.279	13.324	KY 1008 (McLendon Road / Bluegrass Road)	
Franklin	9.513	15.310	US 31W (South Main Street) – Portland, Bowling Green	Northern terminus
1.000 mi = 1.609 km; 1.000 km = 0.621 mi
