= Tompkinsville-Monroe County Airport =

- IATA: none; ICAO: KTZV; FAA LID: TZV

Summary
- Airport type: Public
- Owner: Tompkinsville-Monroe County Airport
- Serves: Tompkinsville, Kentucky
- Elevation AMSL: 1,036 ft / 316 m
- Coordinates: 36°43′44″N 085°39′09″W

Map
- Location of airport in Kentucky

Runways
Direction	Length		Surface
Direction	ft	m	Surface
4/22	4,000	1,219	Asphalt

Statistics (2018)
- Aircraft operations (year ending 4/4/2018): 11,460
- Based aircraft: 45
- Source: Federal Aviation Administration

Tompkinsville-Monroe County Airport (ICAO: KTZV, FAA LID: TZV) is a public use airport located two nautical miles (4 km) northeast of the central business district of Tompkinsville, a city in Monroe County, Kentucky, United States. It is included in the National Plan of Integrated Airport Systems for 2011–2015, which categorized it as a general aviation facility.

Although most U.S. airports use the same three-letter location identifier for the FAA and IATA, this airport is assigned TZV by the FAA but has no designation from the IATA.

== Facilities and aircraft ==
Tompkinsville-Monroe County Airport covers an area of 120 acres (49 ha) at an elevation of 1,036 feet (316 m) above mean sea level. It has one runway designated 4/22 with an asphalt surface measuring 4,000 by 75 feet (1,219 x 23 m).

For the 12-month period ending April 4, 2018, the airport had 11,460 aircraft operations, an average of 31 per day: 90% general aviation, 7% air taxi, and 3% military. At that time there were 35 aircraft based at this airport: 35 single-engine and 10 multi-engine.

== See also ==
- List of airports in Kentucky
