= Hestand, Kentucky =

Unincorporated community in Kentucky, United States

- Unincorporated community
- Location within Kentucky Location within the United States
- Coordinates: 36°39′15″N 85°37′46″W
- Country: United States
- State: Kentucky
- County: Monroe
- Elevation: 879 ft (268 m)
- Time zone: UTC-6 (Central (CST))
  - Summer (DST): UTC-5 (CDT)
- ZIP codes: 42151
- GNIS feature ID: 494096

Hestand is an unincorporated community in Monroe County, Kentucky, United States. There is an Amish like, so-called "para-Amish", Christian community at Vernon Community, Hestand.
