= Tompkinsville, Kentucky =

- City
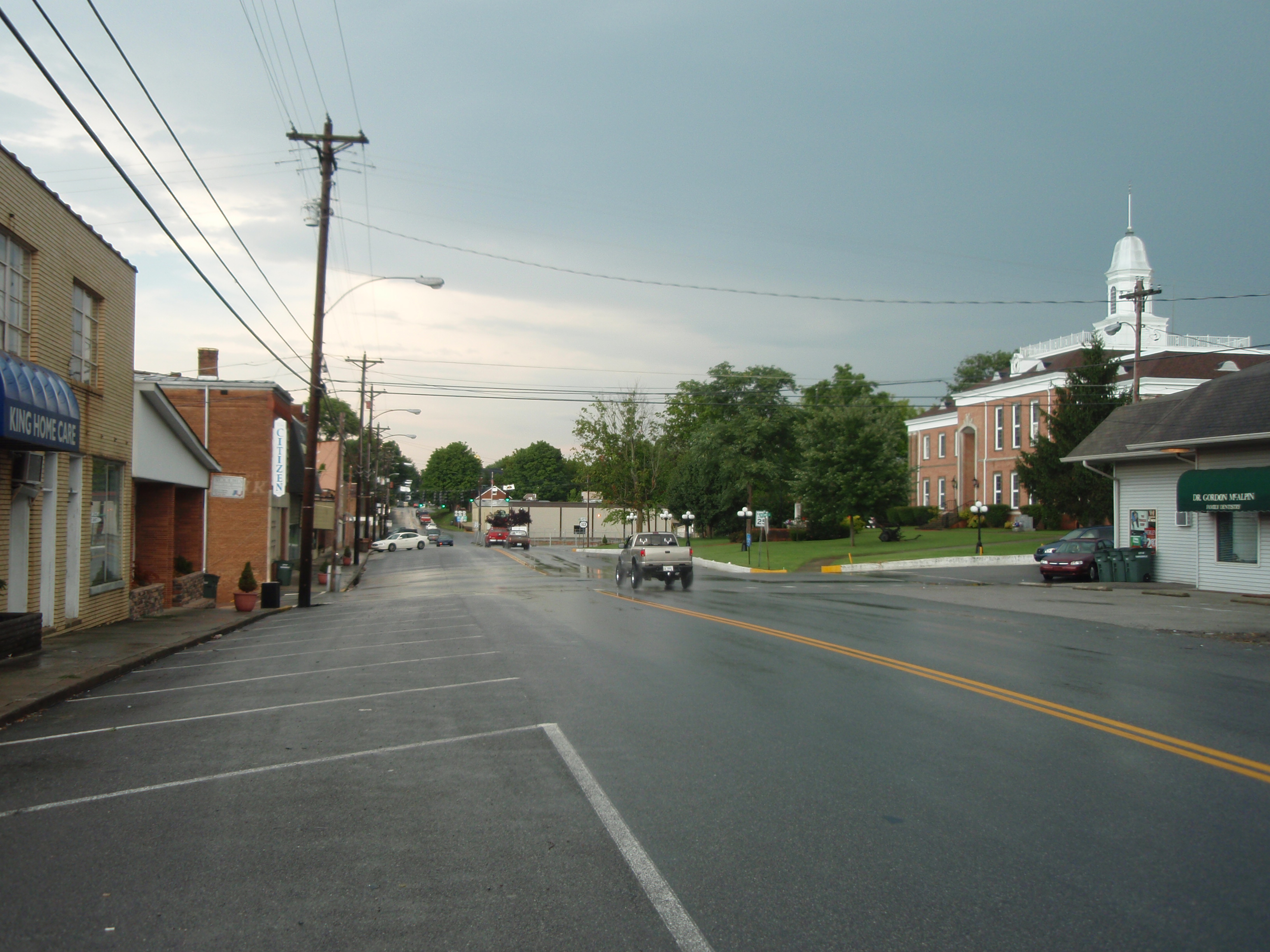
- Downtown Tompkinsville

- Location in Monroe County, Kentucky
- Coordinates: 36°41′58″N 85°41′31″W
- Country: United States
- State: Kentucky
- County: Monroe

Area
  - Total: 3.45 sq mi (8.94 km^{2})
  - Land: 3.29 sq mi (8.51 km^{2})
  - Water: 0.17 sq mi (0.44 km^{2})
- Elevation: 920 ft (280 m)

Population (2020)
  - Total: 2,309
  - Estimate (2022): 2,297
  - Density: 703.0/sq mi (271.44/km^{2})
- Time zone: UTC-6 (Central (CST))
  - Summer (DST): UTC-5 (CDT)
- ZIP code: 42167
- Area codes: 270 & 364
- FIPS code: 21-77160
- GNIS feature ID: 0505341
- Website: tompkinsvilleky.gov

Tompkinsville is a home rule-class city in and the county seat of Monroe County, Kentucky, United States. The population was 2,309 at the 2020 census. The city was named after Vice President Daniel D. Tompkins who served under President James Monroe, for whom the county was named.

== History ==
In 1804, the Old Mulkey Meetinghouse was built. It is today part of the Old Mulkey Meetinghouse State Historic Site. At this site, a graveyard is home to deceased veterans of both the American Revolutionary War and the American Civil War. Daniel Boone's sister, Hannah, is also buried there.

During the Civil War, Tompkinsville was the site of Confederate General John Hunt Morgan's first Kentucky raid. On July 9, 1862, Morgan's Raiders, coming from Tennessee, attacked Major Thomas J. Jordan's 9th Pennsylvania Cavalry. Raiders captured 30 retreating Union soldiers and destroyed tents and stores. They took 20 wagons, 50 mules, 40 horses, sugar and coffee supplies. At Glasgow, Kentucky, they burned supplies, then went north, raiding 16 other towns before returning to Tennessee.

Tompkinsville is home to the famous Dovie's restaurant which has been known for its signature deep-fried hamburgers since 1938.

Alcohol sales became legal in the city, along with Monroe County as a whole, in 2023 after a referendum. Prior to this, the city was dry.

== Geography ==
Tompkinsville is located just east of the center of Monroe County at 36°41′58″N 85°41′31″W (36.699508, -85.692005). Kentucky Routes 63 and 100 pass through the city together as South Main Street, with KY 63 turning onto West 4th Street and KY 100 turning onto North Magnolia Street. KY 63 leads northwest 26 miles (42 km) to Glasgow, while KY 100 leads northeast 22 miles (35 km) to its terminus at Waterview. Together the two highways lead southwest 8 miles (13 km) to Gamaliel. Kentucky Route 163 leaves Tompkinsville to the north on North Main Street, leading 21 miles (34 km) to Edmonton.

According to the United States Census Bureau, Tompkinsville has a total area of 3.45 square miles (8.94 km^{2}), of which 3.28 square miles (8.50 km^{2}) are land and 0.17 square miles (0.44 km^{2}) of it, or 4.87%, are water. Town Creek passes through the city, passing just east of its center and flowing southwest to Mill Creek at the city's southern border. Mill Creek is a west-flowing tributary of the East Fork of the Barren River, part of the Green River watershed.

== Demographics ==
Historical population
Census	Pop.	Note	%±
1830	218		—
1840	188		−13.8%
1870	218		—
1880	248		13.8%
1900	366		—
1910	639		74.6%
1920	721		12.8%
1930	850		17.9%
1940	1,438		69.2%
1950	1,859		29.3%
1960	2,091		12.5%
1970	2,207		5.5%
1980	3,077		39.4%
1990	2,861		−7.0%
2000	2,660		−7.0%
2010	2,402		−9.7%
2020	2,309		−3.9%
2022 (est.)	2,297		−0.5%
U.S. Decennial Census

=== 2020 census ===
As of the 2020 census, Tompkinsville had a population of 2,309. The median age was 43.8 years. 22.9% of residents were under the age of 18 and 22.5% of residents were 65 years of age or older. For every 100 females there were 84.1 males, and for every 100 females age 18 and over there were 77.3 males age 18 and over.

0.0% of residents lived in urban areas, while 100.0% lived in rural areas.

There were 988 households in Tompkinsville, of which 30.5% had children under the age of 18 living in them. Of all households, 34.3% were married-couple households, 17.6% were households with a male householder and no spouse or partner present, and 40.5% were households with a female householder and no spouse or partner present. About 37.5% of all households were made up of individuals and 18.4% had someone living alone who was 65 years of age or older.

There were 1,144 housing units, of which 13.6% were vacant. The homeowner vacancy rate was 1.2% and the rental vacancy rate was 11.6%.

Racial composition as of the 2020 census
Race	Number	Percent
White	1,920	83.2%
Black or African American	163	7.1%
American Indian and Alaska Native	10	0.4%
Asian	6	0.3%
Native Hawaiian and Other Pacific Islander	0	0.0%
Some other race	79	3.4%
Two or more races	131	5.7%
Hispanic or Latino (of any race)	150	6.5%

=== 2000 census ===
As of the census of 2000, there were 2,660 people, 1,169 households, and 702 families living in the city. The population density was 727.4 inhabitants per square mile (280.9/km^{2}). There were 1,321 housing units at an average density of 361.2 per square mile (139.5/km^{2}). The racial makeup of the city was 89.47% White, 8.95% African American, 0.04% Native American, 0.08% Pacific Islander, 0.53% from other races, and 0.94% from two or more races. Hispanic or Latino of any race were 1.09% of the population.

There were 1,169 households, out of which 26.3% had children under the age of 18 living with them, 40.3% were married couples living together, 16.4% had a female householder with no husband present, and 39.9% were non-families. 37.8% of all households were made up of individuals, and 18.4% had someone living alone who was 65 years of age or older. The average household size was 2.16 and the average family size was 2.84.

In the city, the population was spread out, with 21.9% under the age of 18, 8.5% from 18 to 24, 25.3% from 25 to 44, 21.9% from 45 to 64, and 22.4% who were 65 years of age or older. The median age was 41 years. For every 100 females, there were 76.0 males. For every 100 females age 18 and over, there were 72.8 males.

The median income for a household in the city was $18,267, and the median income for a family was $23,361. Males had a median income of $21,587 versus $16,541 for females. The per capita income for the city was $15,975. About 24.5% of families and 29.0% of the population were below the poverty line, including 35.8% of those under age 18 and 23.9% of those age 65 or over.

== Education ==
Tompkinsville has a public library, the William B. Harlan Memorial Library.

== Notable people ==
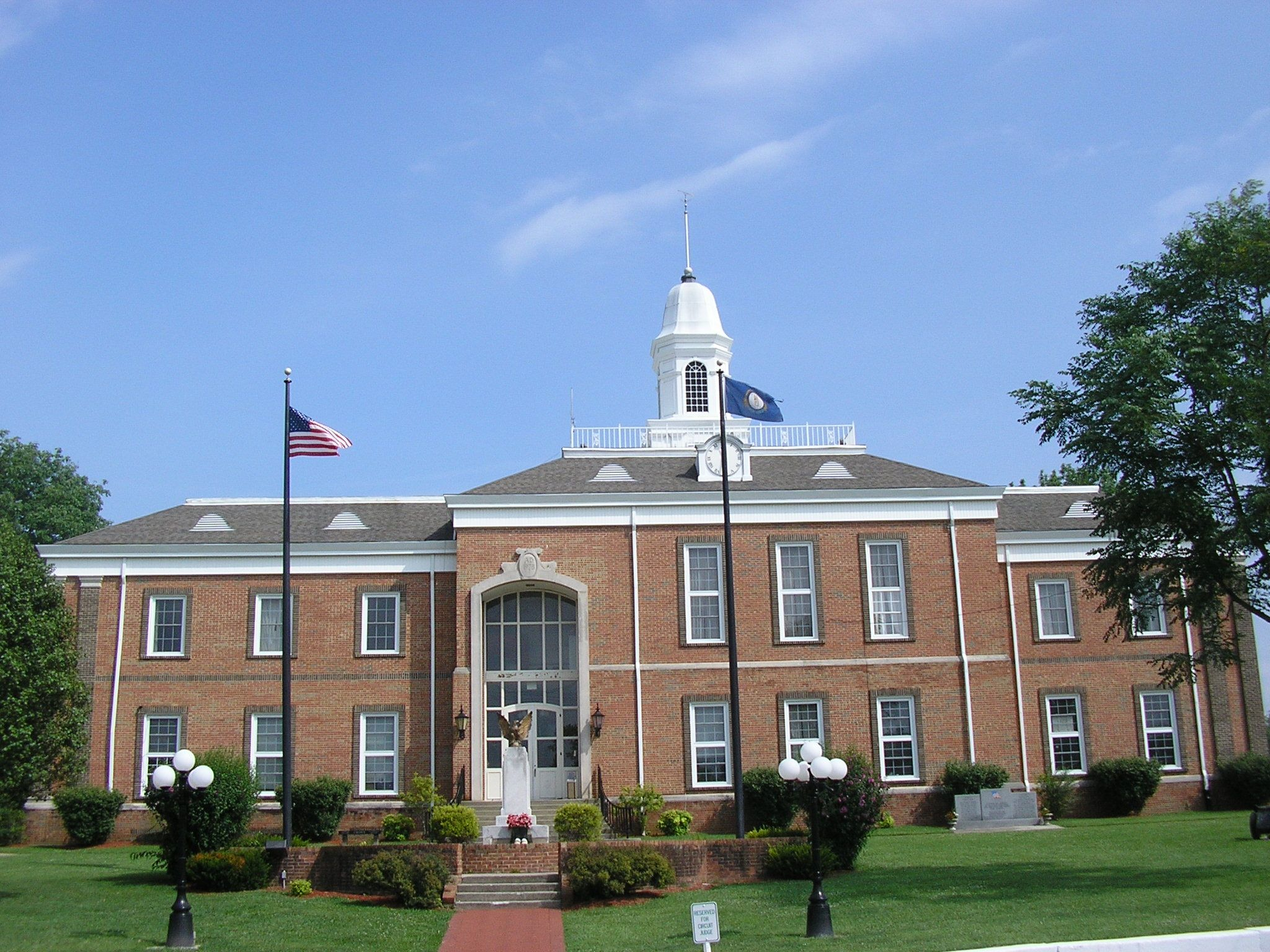
Monroe County Courthouse in Tompkinsville

- Tim Lee Carter, U.S. representative from Kentucky
- James Comer, Kentucky Commissioner of Agriculture, U.S. representative
- Joe H. Eagle, U.S. representative from Texas
- Tom Emberton, politician and judge
- Elois Grooms, former defensive lineman in the National Football League
- Eagle Keys, football coach and player of Canadian football
- Samuel B. Maxey, major general for the Confederacy in the Civil War who later represented Texas in the U.S. Senate
- Shawn McPherson, member of the Kentucky House of Representatives
- Pearl Carter Pace, one of the earliest elected women as sheriff in Kentucky
