= Kentucky Route 11 =

Highway in Kentucky

Kentucky Route 11
- Ky 11; mainline in red, business route in blue

Route information
- Maintained by KYTC
- Length: 182.546 mi (293.779 km)

Major junctions
- South end: KY 92 near Siler
- US 25E in Barbourville; US 421 / KY 80 near Manchester; US 421 near Burning Springs; Mountain Parkway / KY 15 in Slade; US 60 / US 460 in Mount Sterling; I-64 in Mount Sterling; AA Hwy (KY 9) near Maysville
- North end: US 62 / KY 10 in Maysville

Location
- Country: United States
- State: Kentucky
- Counties: Whitley, Knox, Clay, Owsley, Lee, Wolfe, Powell, Montgomery, Bath, Fleming, Mason

Highway system
- Kentucky State Highway System; Interstate; US; State; Parkways
← KY 10	→ KY 12

Kentucky Route 11 (KY 11) is an American highway maintained by the Kentucky Transportation Cabinet that runs from Maysville to Barbourville. The route from Maysville to Mount Sterling is being upgraded on a new alignment as part of a "macro-corridor" within the state of Kentucky.

== Route description ==
The only part of KY 11 the Federal Highway Administration classifies as part of the National Highway System is on its concurrency with U.S. Route 25E (US 25E) in Barbourville. The Kentucky Transportation Cabinet includes KY 11 as part of the state primary classification of the state primary road system along the US 25E concurrency in Barbourville, along the portion of its US 421 overlap between Manchester and Fall Rock, from KY 30 at Levi to the Bert T. Combs Mountain Parkway at Slade, and from KY 686 in Mount Sterling to its northern terminus in Maysville. The agency classifies the remainder of KY 11 as a state secondary highway.

KY 11's route from its southern terminus in Whitley County through Knox and Clay counties to Booneville in Owsley County, is through the dissected Appalachian Plateau, a forested dissected plateau that lies to the west of the major ridges of the Appalachian Mountains and is drained by the Cumberland River to the south and the Kentucky River to the north. From Booneville to the Lee–Wolfe county line north of Beattyville, the highway passes through the Kentucky/Ohio Carboniferous Plateau, a less-rugged region with a mix of forest, pasture, and cropland drained by the Kentucky River. KY 11 continues northwest through parts of Wolfe and Powell counties through the Northern Forested Plateau Escarpment, a rugged, forested area that runs along the Pottsville Escarpment that forms the western edge of the Appalachian Plateau. The Red River, a tributary of the Kentucky River, drains that region and the Knobs–Lower Scioto Dissected Plateau, a forested region of lower hills the route passes through in Powell County that forms a ring around the Outer Bluegrass, the outer ring of the Bluegrass region. The Outer Bluegrass, which KY 71 traverses from south of Mount Sterling to its northern terminus in Maysville through Montgomery, Bath, Fleming, and Mason counties, is a region of rolling hills that is predominantly farmland. The eastern part of the Outer Bluegrass that KY 11 passes through drains to the Licking River except in Maysville, where streams flow directly into the Ohio River.

=== Carpenter to Manchester ===
KY 11 begins at an intersection with KY 92 north of the hamlet of Carpenter. The two-lane highway heads northeast along Buffalo Creek to its headwaters and crosses a ridge to the hamlet of Gausdale, where the route meets the east end of KY 779 (Maple Creek Road). KY 11 follows the Cumberland River northeast into Knox County. The highway cuts across a bend of the river, where the route crosses Little Poplar Creek and meets the north and west ends, respectively, of KY 1809 and KY 1530 (J. Logan Road). KY 11 continues through the Cumberland River valley to the city of Barbourville, which the route enters at its intersection with KY 3441 (Davis Bend Road). The route follows Main Street to the top of the bend and crosses the river into the downtown area. One block south of the Knox County Courthouse, Main Street intersects Daniel Boone Drive; KY 459 heads west on Daniel Boone Drive, KY 6 heads north on Main Street through the Barbourville Commercial District, and KY 11 turns east onto Daniel Boone Drive. KY 11 intersects KY 2421 (Cumberland Avenue) and crosses a CSX rail line immediately before the highway's junction with US 25E. The state highway runs north concurrently with the four-lane divided U.S. Highway along the railroad. The routes intersect KY 2420 (Knox Road) before KY 11 splits northeast and meets the south end of KY 2418 as the former route leaves Barbourville.

KY 11 parallels a CSX rail spur north through the valley of Little Richland Creek. The highway meets the north end of KY 3440, passes through the village of Cannon, and meets the east end of KY 3438 (Long Branch Road). KY 11 leaves Little Richland Creek and passes through Girdler, where the highway runs concurrently with KY 1304. The highway continues with the railroad through the valley of Collins Creek, where the routes pass through Woollum before entering Clay County. The highway, railroad, and Collins Fork pass through the hamlets of Cottongim and Bluehole. KY 11 crosses Engine Creek shortly before Collins Fork empties into Goose Creek. The highway intersects and joins US 421 and KY 80 on Muddy Gap Road just south of the Hal Rogers Parkway, which crosses the concurrent highways with no access southeast of Manchester.

US 421, KY 11, and KY 80 continue northwest into the city of Manchester. At Horse Creek, the highways meet the south end of KY 3480 (Old Route 421) and the west end of KY 3481 (Swafford Street). KY 80 turns south toward a diamond interchange with the parkway at a four-legged intersection with KY 2076, which follows Muddy Gap Road west. US 421 and KY 11 turn north onto four-lane divided White Street and meet the north end of KY 3481 as the two routes follow Goose Creek north into downtown Manchester. As the routes veer away from Goose Creek, they meet the west end of KY 2438 (2nd Street), the south end of KY 2440 (Main Street), and the east end of KY 687 (Town Branch Road). On the west edge of downtown, US 421 and KY 11 meet the north end of the KY 2440 (Main Street), the east end of KY 2442 (Maple Street), and the west end of KY 3472 (Memorial Drive). The highways cross Little Goose Creek at its confluence with Goose Creek and meet the east end of KY 638 as they leave Manchester on Richmond Road.

=== Manchester to Beattyville ===
US 421 and KY 11 pass Clay County High School and meet the east ends of KY 3560 (Fox Hollow Road) and KY 3473 (Island Creek–Sizemore Road) between a crossing of Island Creek. The highways meet the west end of KY 3477 (Jacks Branch Road) at Fall Rock before crossing Laurel Creek immediately before a T intersection where US 421 continues northwest along the creek and KY 11 heads east along the creek. KY 11 follows Laurel Creek to its confluence with Goose Creek at Tanksley. The highway continues northeast through Wild Cat and Hensley to the city of Oneida, where Goose Creek and the Red Bird River merge to form the South Fork Kentucky River. At a T intersection, KY 66 continues along River Street into the center of town while KY 11 turns north. KY 11 follows the valley of the South Fork Kentucky River north through Teges and into Owsley County. The highway crosses Sexton Creek and meets the east end of KY 577 at Taft, passes over Lower Island Creek and intersects the east end of KY 846 at Conkling, and bridges White Oak Creek and has a junction with KY 2025 at Southfork. KY 11 meets the east end of KY 1938 as it enters the city of Booneville on Main Street. In the center of the county seat, KY 11 turns left to join KY 30 on Church Street, which crosses Buck Creek.

West of Booneville, KY 11 and KY 30 meet the west end of KY 3504. Approaching Levi, KY 3536 splits southwest to pass through the village while KY 11 and KY 30 bypass the village and diverge, with KY 30 heading southwest and KY 11 heading north through the hamlet of Pebworth and into Lee County. KY 11 follows Long Branch north through junctions with the west end of KY 3332 and the east end of KY 587. The highway intersects the spur part of KY 3150 at Congleton and both ends of the loop part of KY 3150 at Proctor before entering the city of Beattyville. KY 11 crosses the South Fork Kentucky River, meets the north end of KY 1411 (South Fork Road), meets KY 52 at a T intersection, and turns north onto Broadway with KY 52 to cross the North Fork Kentucky River east of the confluence of the two forks to form the Kentucky River proper. In the center of town, the two routes intersect a rail line at grade, then KY 52 splits west onto Main Street while KY 11 heads north out of town.

=== Beattyville to Clay City ===
KY 11 heads through northern Lee County. The highway meets the east end of KY 498 halfway between Beattyville and Zoe, where the route intersects KY 3330 (Shoemaker Ridge Road). KY 11 meets the east end of KY 1036 at Zachariah at the Lee–Wolfe county line and the west end of KY 715 a little to the north. The highway closely follows the Middle Fork of the Red River from its headwaters northwest into Powell County. KY 11 continues through the Red River Gorge and through Natural Bridge State Resort Park on its way to Slade, where the highway has a diamond interchange with the Mountain Parkway. Immediately to the north of the interchange, KY 11 turns west and joins KY 15 on Campton Road. The two highways head west through the valley of the Middle Fork Red River, parallel to the parkway, through junctions with KY 77 (Nada Tunnel Road) at Nada, KY 1639 (South Fork Road) at the confluence of the South and Middle forks of the Red River, and KY 613 (North Fork Road) at Bowen at the confluence of the Middle Fork with the North Fork to form the Red River proper.

KY 11 and KY 15 continue west through Rosslyn, where the routes meet KY 3354 (Cat Creek Road) and KY 1184 (Cane Creek Road) and cross to the north side of the parkway. The highways pass through the city of Stanton on College Avenue. In the center of the city, KY 11 and KY 15 intersect KY 213 (Main Street); the routes also have junctions with KY 2483 (Sipple Street) and KY 2486 (Washington Street). The highways cross Judy Creek and meet the south end of KY 2073 (Halls Lane) as they head west out of town. KY 11 and KY 15 follow Stanton Road to Clay City, where they follow Main Street. In the east end of town, the highways meet the east end of KY 2480 (10th Avenue), the north end of KY 1057 (11th Street), and KY 2026 (9th Street) and pass by the Clay City National Bank Building. KY 11 and KY 15 continue by the south end of KY 2479 (3rd Street) and diverge near the west end of town after KY 11 crosses the Red River for the last time.

=== Clay City to Mount Sterling ===
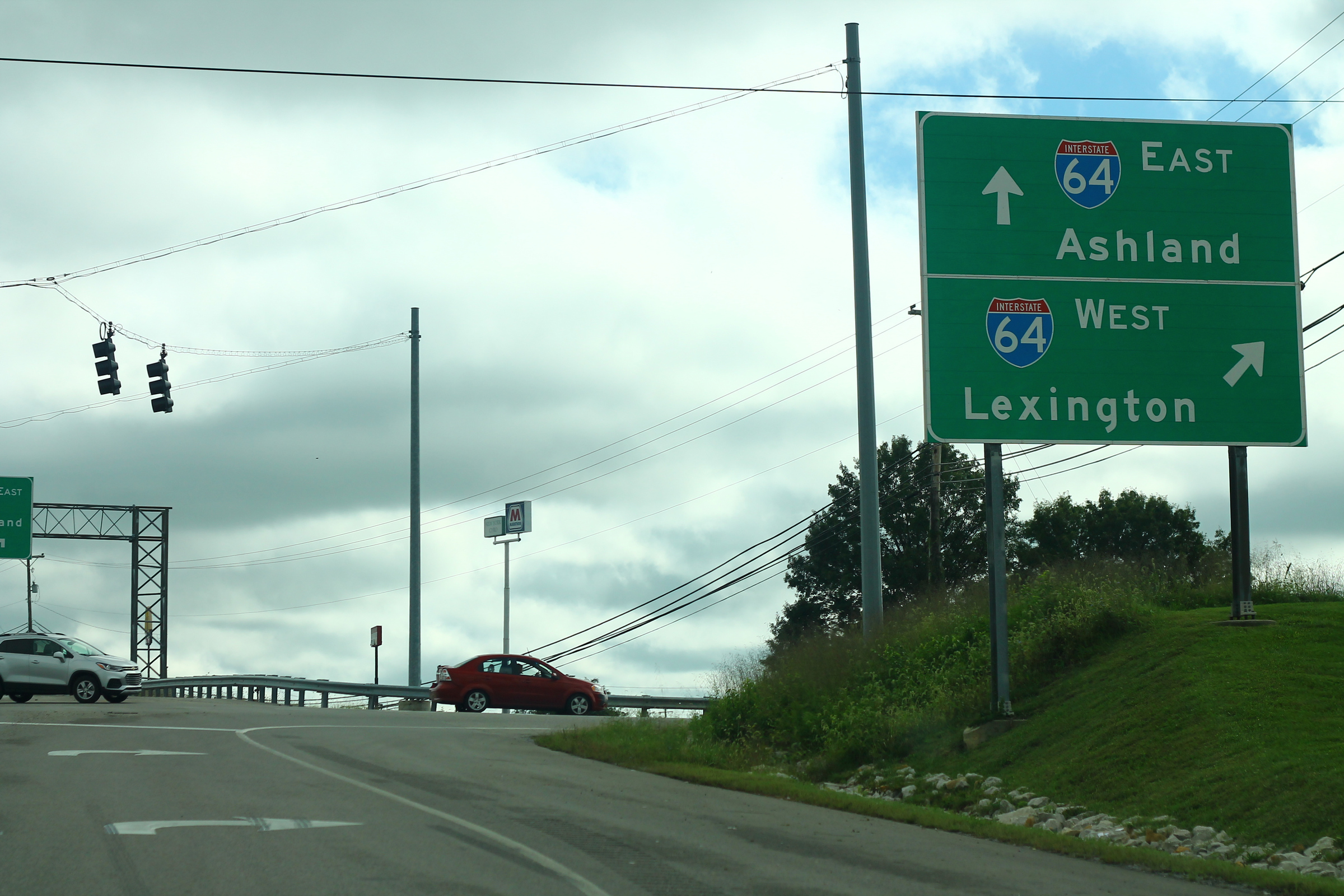
KY 11 and US 460 at I-64 in Mount Sterling

KY 11 heads north out of Clay City along Black Creek Road, which follows Black Creek to its headwaters east of Pilot Knob State Nature Preserve at the Powell–Montgomery county line. The highway, now named Levee Road, meets the south end of KY 3363 (Sawmill Road) and follows Hog Creek north to Levee, where the route briefly runs concurrently with KY 646 (Nest Egg Road to the west, Cream Alley Road to the east). KY 11 continues along Lulbegrud Creek to Bogy-Chennault, where the route has another short overlap with KY 646, which heads west along Kiddville Road and east along Tonkin Road. The highway starts to follow Hinkston Creek as it approaches the city of Mount Sterling, which the highway enters at its junction with the Mount Sterling bypass road, KY 686 (Indian Mound Drive).

KY 11 meets the east end of KY 2348 (Calk Avenue) one block before its junction with US 460 (Camargo Road), which the state-numbered highway joins to head toward the center of town. The routes cross Hinkston Creek and enter the Mount Sterling Commercial District on Bank Street, which passes to the west of the historic Chesapeake and Ohio Depot. US 460 and KY 11 turn east on Main Street to join US 60 and KY 713 for one block before the former set of highways turn north onto Maysville Street. North of downtown, the highways meet the south end of KY 1991 (Hinkston Pike). US 460 and KY 11 meet the north end of KY 686 a few blocks south of their diamond interchange with I-64. US 460 and KY 11 diverge at the north city limit of Mount Sterling, with US 460 heading west on Paris Road and KY 11 continuing north on Maysville Road.

=== Mount Sterling to Maysville ===
KY 11 passes to the east of the village of Judy while Old Maysville Road passes through; KY 11 intersects KY 537 (Van Thompson Road) on the village bypass. North of Judy, the highway crosses Hinkston Creek and enters Bath County. KY 11 follows Town Branch north from the county line; the route meets the west end of KY 3289 (Springfield Road) and intersects KY 1198 (Rich Lan Road), which runs concurrently with KY 11 to Sharpsburg. KY 11 bypasses the populated part of town; while passing through the fringe, KY 1198 splits east onto Camp Street into the center of town. North of Sharpsburg, KY 11 meets KY 36; the two highways overlap north to midway between Sharpsburg and Bethel, where KY 36 splits northwest onto Moorefield Road. West of Bethel, KY 1106 splits onto Bethel Ridge Road to the center of the village while KY 11 bypasses the village. At Sherburne, the highway crosses the Licking River and enters Fleming County while on a concurrency with KY 1325, which follows East Fork Road south of the river and Three Mile Run Road north of the river.

KY 11 enters Fleming County on Mount Sterling Road, which passes through the hamlet of Conford on its way to Tilton. Tilton Road splits northeast to pass through the center of the village while KY 11 bypasses it. Tilton Road carries KY 1336 at the south junction and KY 2081 at the north junction; in between, KY 11 meets the west end of KY 156 (Poplar Plains Road). North of Tilton, the highway crosses Fleming Creek and Cassidy Creek as it approaches Flemingsburg. At the south city limit, KY 11 intersects KY 32 (Morehead Road); KY 11 Business continues on Mount Sterling Road toward downtown Flemingsburg while KY 11 joins KY 32 heading northwest on the Bypass Road. On the west side of the city, the bypass intersects Elizaville Avenue. KY 32 and KY 57 head west on Elizaville Avenue, KY 32 Business and KY 57 Business head east on the avenue toward the center of town, and KY 11 and KY 57 continue north on the bypass. KY 11 and KY 57 intersect KY 559 (Helena Pike) before the bypass intersects Maysville Road. From that intersection, KY 11 Business heads south toward downtown, KY 57 continues east on the Bypass Road, and KY 11 heads north toward Mason County.

KY 11 enters Mason County at Weedonia, where the route meets the east end of KY 324 (Helena Road). The route meets the west end of KY 597 (Mount Gilead Road) and passes Fleming-Mason Airport on its way to Marshall, where KY 11 curves east to bypass the village of Lewisburg. The road through Lewisburg is designated KY 3170 on the south end and KY 419 on the north end; between the intersections, KY 11 crosses the North Fork Licking River and bridges Strodes Run Pike and a CSX rail line. At the south city limit of Maysville, the highway intersects and briefly runs concurrently with KY 1448 (Maple Leaf Road) to KY 9 (AA Highway), where KY 1448 turns east. KY 11 follows Limestone Creek as the stream descends to the Ohio River. The highway reaches its northern terminus at US 62 and KY 10, which follow Coughlin Boulevard either west uphill or north downhill into downtown Maysville.

== Major intersections ==
County	Location	mi	km	Destinations	Notes
Whitley		0.000	0.000	KY 92	Southern terminus
Whitley	Gausdale	2.173	3.497	KY 779 west	Eastern terminus of KY 779
Knox		5.851	9.416	KY 1809 south	Northern terminus of KY 1809
Knox		6.361	10.237	KY 1530 west	Eastern terminus of KY 1530
Knox		11.102	17.867	KY 3441 east	Western terminus of KY 3441
Knox	Barbourville	12.219	19.665	KY 459 west (Daniel Boone Drive) / KY 6 west (South Main Street) – Dr. Thomas Walker State Historic Site	Eastern terminus of KY 459 and KY 6
Knox	Barbourville	12.415	19.980	Cumberland Avenue (KY 2421) – Union College	
Knox	Barbourville	12.687	20.418	US 25E south (Cumberland Gap Parkway) – Pineville	South end of US 25E concurrency
Knox	Barbourville	12.844	20.670	Knox Street (KY 2420 west)	Eastern terminus of KY 2420
Knox	Heidrick	13.453	21.651	US 25E north (Cumberland Gap Parkway) – Corbin	North end of US 25E concurrency
Knox	Heidrick	14.072	22.647	KY 2418 north	Southern terminus of KY 2418
Knox		15.410	24.800	KY 3440 south	Northern terminus of KY 3440
Knox	Cannon	17.267	27.789	KY 3438 west	Eastern terminus of KY 3438
Knox	Girdler	18.892	30.404	KY 1304 south	South end of KY 1304 overlap
Knox	Girdler	19.628	31.588	KY 1304 north	North end of KY 1304 overlap
Clay	Bluehole	32.793	52.775	Buzzard Road	Former KY 3469 south
Clay		34.930	56.214	US 421 south / KY 80 east – Hyden	South end of US 421/KY 80 concurrency
Clay		35.803	57.619	KY 3480 north (Old Highway 421)	Southern terminus of KY 3480; former route of US 421
Clay		35.926	57.817	KY 3481 north (Swafford Street)	Southern terminus of KY 3481
Clay	Manchester	36.118	58.126	KY 80 west to Hal Rogers Parkway / KY 2076 north (Muddy Gap Road)	North end of KY 80 overlap; 80 to the south, 2076 straight ahead, 421/11 go to the north
Clay	Manchester	36.501	58.743	KY 3480 south (Old Highway 421)	Northern terminus of KY 3480; former route of US 421
Clay	Manchester	37.172	59.823	2nd Street (KY 2438 east)	Western terminus of KY 2438
Clay	Manchester	37.223	59.905	Main Street (KY 2440 north)	Southern terminus of KY 2440
Clay	Manchester	37.319	60.059	KY 687 west (Town Branch Road)	Eastern terminus of KY 687
Clay	Manchester	37.656	60.601	KY 2442 west (Maple Street)	Eastern terminus of KY 2442
Clay	Manchester	37.739	60.735	KY 2440 south (Cool Springs Road)	Northern terminus of KY 2440
Clay	Manchester	37.783	60.806	KY 3472 east (Memorial Drive)	Western terminus of KY 3472
Clay	Manchester	38.020	61.187	KY 638 west	Eastern terminus of KY 638
Clay		39.416	63.434	Fox Hollow Road (KY 3560 west)	Eastern terminus of KY 3560
Clay		40.017	64.401	KY 3473 west (Charlie Sizemore Road)	Eastern terminus of KY 3473
Clay	Fall Rock	42.055	67.681	KY 3477 east (Jacks Branch Road)	Western terminus of KY 3477
Clay		43.219	69.554	US 421 north – McKee	North end of US 421 concurrency
Clay	Oneida	53.939	86.806	KY 66 south to Hal Rogers Parkway east	Northern terminus of KY 66
Owsley	Taft	62.897	101.223	KY 577 west	Eastern terminus of KY 577
Owsley	Conkling	65.044	104.678	KY 846 west	Eastern terminus of KY 846
Owsley		67.247	108.224	KY 2025 west	Eastern terminus of KY 2025
Owsley		71.745	115.462	KY 1938 west	Eastern terminus of KY 1938
Owsley	Booneville	73.065	117.587	KY 30 east to KY 28 – Buckhorn, Jackson	South end of KY 30 overlap; KY 28 one block east of intersection
Owsley		74.705	120.226	KY 3504 east	Western terminus of KY 3504
Owsley		75.294	121.174	KY 30 west – Tyner, London	North end of KY 30 overlap
Lee		80.282	129.201	KY 3332 east	Western terminus of KY 3332
Lee		80.985	130.333	KY 587 south	Northern terminus of KY 587
Lee	Congleton	82.110	132.143	KY 3150 south	South end of KY 3150 overlap
Lee		82.762	133.193	KY 3150 north (Proctor Road)	North end of KY 3150 overlap
Lee		83.295	134.050	KY 3150 south (Proctor Road)	Northern terminus of KY 3150
Lee	Beattyville	83.510	134.396	KY 1411 south (South Fork Road)	Northern terminus of KY 1411
Lee	Beattyville	83.543	134.449	KY 52 east – Jackson	South end of KY 52 overlap; 52 east straight ahead, 11/52 west to the north
Lee	Beattyville	83.851	134.945	KY 52 west (Main Street) – Ravenna	North end of KY 52 overlap
Lee		88.818	142.939	KY 498 west to KY 52 – Irvine, Richmond	Eastern terminus of KY 498
Lee		92.024	148.098	KY 3330 south	Northern terminus of KY 3330
Wolfe	Zachariah	94.283	151.734	KY 1036 south	Northern terminus of KY 1036
Wolfe		94.590	152.228	KY 715 north	Southern terminus of KY 715
Powell		101.045	162.616	Hemlock Ridge Road – Natural Bridge State Resort Park	Main entrance to the park
Powell		102.996– 103.145	165.756– 165.996	Mountain Parkway – Lexington, Prestonsburg	Interchange; Mountain Parkway exit 33; rest area on west side of KY 11 at 102.996
Powell		103.155	166.012	KY 15 south (Campton Road) – Red River Gorge, Campton	South end of KY 15 overlap
Powell		104.651	168.419	KY 77 north (Nada Tunnel Road) – Nada Tunnel, Red River Gorge	Southern terminus of KY 77
Powell		107.103	172.366	KY 1639 south (South Fork Road)	Northern terminus of KY 1639
Powell	Bowen	108.968	175.367	KY 613 east (Little North Fork Road)	Western terminus of KY 613
Powell		111.986	180.224	KY 3354 south (Cat Creek Road)	Northern terminus of KY 3354
Powell	Rosslyn	112.466	180.996	KY 1184 north (Little North Bend Road)	Southern terminus of KY 1184
Powell	Stanton			KY 213 (Main Street) to Mountain Parkway – Ravenna, Jeffersonville	Parkway to the south
Powell	Stanton	114.762	184.692	KY 2483 south (South Sipple Street)	Northern terminus of KY 2483
Powell	Stanton	114.890	184.898	KY 2486 north (Washington Street)	Southern terminus of KY 2486
Powell	Stanton	115.424	185.757	KY 2073 north (Halls Lane)	Southern terminus of KY 2073
Powell		118.397	190.542	KY 2480 north (10th Avenue)	Southern terminus of KY 2480
Powell	Clay City	118.840	191.254	KY 1057 east (11th Street)	Western terminus of KY 1057
Powell	Clay City	119.557	192.408	KY 2026 east (Pompeii Road) / KY 2481 south (9th Street)	Western terminus of KY 2026; northern terminus of KY 2481
Powell	Clay City	120.092	193.269	KY 2479 north (3rd Street)	Southern terminus of KY 2479
Powell	Clay City	120.528	193.971	KY 15 north (Main Street) to Mountain Parkway – Beattyville, Hazard, Winchester	North end of KY 15 overlap; 15 to the west, 11 turns north
Montgomery		125.035	201.224	KY 3363 north (Sawmill Road)	Southern terminus of KY 3363
Montgomery		128.506	206.810	KY 646 north (Nest Egg Road)	South end of KY 646 overlap
Montgomery		128.618	206.991	KY 646 south (Cream Alley Road)	North end of KY 646 overlap
Montgomery		131.663	211.891	KY 646 south (Kiddville Road)	South end of KY 646 overlap
Montgomery		132.036	212.491	KY 646 north (Tonkin Road)	North end of KY 646 overlap
Montgomery	Mount Sterling	133.829	215.377	KY 686 (Indian Mound Drive) to I-64	
Montgomery	Mount Sterling	134.506	216.466	Calk Avenue (KY 2348 west)	Eastern terminus of KY 2348
Montgomery	Mount Sterling	134.603	216.623	US 460 east (Apperson Heights) – Jeffersonville, Frenchburg, West Liberty	South end of US 460 concurrency
Montgomery	Mount Sterling	135.028	217.307	US 60 / KY 713 west (West Main Street) – Winchester	South end of US 60/KY 713 concurrency
Montgomery	Mount Sterling	135.099	217.421	US 60 / KY 713 east (East Main Street) – Morehead	North end of US 60/KY 713 concurrency
Montgomery	Mount Sterling	135.739	218.451	KY 1991 north (Hinkston Pike)	Southern terminus of KY 1991
Montgomery	Mount Sterling	136.367	219.461	KY 686 east (Indian Mound Drive)	Western terminus of KY 686
Montgomery	Mount Sterling	136.564– 136.686	219.778– 219.975	I-64 – Ashland, Lexington	Interchange; I-64 exit 110
Montgomery	Mount Sterling	137.332	221.014	US 460 west (Paris Road) – North Middletown, Paris	North end of US 460 concurrency
Montgomery	Judy	140.324	225.830	KY 537 (Van Thompson Road / Bunker Hill Road)	
Bath		143.800	231.424	KY 3289 south (Springfield Road)	Northern terminus of KY 3289
Bath		145.209	233.691	KY 1198 west (Rich-Lan Road)	South end of KY 1198 overlap
Bath	Sharpsburg	145.940	234.868	KY 1198 east (Camp Street) – Sharpsburg	North end of KY 1198 overlap
Bath		146.432	235.659	KY 36 east – Owingsville, Frenchburg	South end of KY 36 overlap
Bath		148.573	239.105	KY 36 west – Moorefield, Carlisle, Blue Licks Battlefield State Park	North end of KY 36 overlap
Bath		150.212	241.743	KY 1106 south – Bethel	Northern terminus of KY 1106
Bath	South Sherburne	154.892	249.275	KY 1325 south	South end of KY 1325 overlap
Fleming	Sherburne	155.063	249.550	KY 1325 north (Three Mile Road) – Sherburne	North end of KY 1325 overlap
Fleming		160.211	257.835	KY 1336 south – Tilton	Northern terminus of KY 1336
Fleming		160.789	258.765	KY 156 east (Poplar Plains Road) – Tilton	Western terminus of KY 156
Fleming		161.254	259.513	KY 2081 south (Tilton Road)	Northern terminus of KY 2081
Fleming	Flemingsburg	165.397	266.181	KY 32 east (Morehead Road) / KY 11 Bus. north (Mt. Sterling Avenue) – Flemingsburg, Morehead	Southern terminus of KY 11 business route; south end of KY 32 concurrency
Fleming	Flemingsburg	166.422	267.830	KY 32 Bus. east (Elizaville Avenue) / KY 32 west / KY 57 south (Elizaville Road) – Carlisle	Western terminus of KY 32 business route; north end of KY 32 overlap; south end of KY 57 overlap
Fleming		167.555	269.654	KY 559 (Helena Road)	
Fleming	Flemingsburg	168.001	270.371	KY 11 Bus. south (West Water Street) / KY 57 north (Bypass Extension)	Northern terminus of KY 11 business route; north end of KY 57 overlap
Mason	Weedonia	172.339	277.353	KY 324 west – Mayslick	Eastern terminus of KY 324
Mason		173.989	280.008	KY 597 south	Northern terminus of KY 597
Mason	Marshall	175.962	283.183	KY 3170 north – Lewisburg	Southern terminus of KY 3170
Mason		178.159	286.719	KY 419 south – Lewisburg	Northern terminus of KY 419
Mason		180.239	290.067	KY 1448 north (East Maple Leaf Road)	South end of KY 1448 overlap
Mason	Maysville	180.334	290.219	AA Hwy (KY 9) / KY 1448 south – Brooksville, Vanceburg	North end of KY 1448 overlap; 1448 turns south
Mason	Maysville	182.866	294.294	KY 2519 north (Lexington Street)	Southern terminus of KY 2519
Mason	Maysville	183.097	294.666	US 62 / KY 10	Northern terminus
1.000 mi = 1.609 km; 1.000 km = 0.621 mi: Concurrency terminus

== Business routes ==
=== Flemingsburg business route ===
Kentucky Route 11 Business
- Location: Flemingsburg
- Length: 2.184 mi (3.515 km)

Kentucky Route 11 Business (KY 11 Bus.) is an 2.184-mile-long (3.515 km) business route through Flemingsburg in central Fleming County. KY 11 Bus. begins at a four-legged intersection with KY 11 and KY 32 at the south city limit of Flemingsburg. From the junction, KY 11 heads south on Mount Sterling Road, KY 32 heads east on Morehead Road, and KY 11 and KY 32 head west on the Bypass Road. KY 11 Bus. heads north on Mount Sterling Avenue, which meets the south end of KY 2305 (Clark Street), crosses Town Branch, and enters the Flemingsburg Historic District. Mount Sterling Avenue ends at Water Street and continues as Fox Spring Avenue; from this intersection, KY 559 heads northeast on Fox Spring Avenue, KY 32 Bus. heads southeast on Water Street, and KY 11 Bus., KY 32 Bus., and KY 559 head northwest on Water Street. At the highways intersection with Main Cross Street, which carries KY 57 Bus., KY 32 Bus. turns southwest onto Main Cross Street. KY 11 Bus. and KY 559 pass the Thomas W. Fleming House in downtown and First Presbyterian Church at their intersection with KY 2504 (West Main Street). Near the north city limit, KY 11 Bus. and KY 559 diverge, onto Helena Road and Maysville Road, respectively, at an oblique intersection; KY 2508 (Stockyard Road) connects the two roads north of their split. At the north city limit, KY 11 Bus. ends at the Bypass Road, which carries KY 11 and KY 57 west and KY 57 east; Maysville Road continues north as KY 11.

==== Major intersections ====
The entire route is in Flemingsburg, Fleming County.

mi	km	Destinations	Notes
0.000	0.000	KY 11 (Mount Sterling Road / Bypass Road) / KY 32 (Morehead Road)	Southern terminus
0.362	0.583	KY 2503 north (Clark Street)	Southern terminus of KY 2503
0.685	1.102	KY 32 Bus. east (East Water Street) / KY 559 east (Fox Spring Avenue)	South end of KY 32 Bus. / KY 559 overlap
0.820	1.320	KY 32 Bus. west / KY 57 Bus. (Main Cross Street)	North end of KY 32 Bus. overlap
1.022	1.645	KY 2504 east (West Main Street)	Western terminus of KY 2504
1.284	2.066	KY 559 west	North end of KY 559 overlap
1.595	2.567	KY 2508 south	Northern terminus of KY 2508
1.772	2.852	KY 597 north	Southern terminus of KY 597
2.184	3.515	KY 11 (Maysville Road) / KY 57 (Bypass Road)	Northern terminus
1.000 mi = 1.609 km; 1.000 km = 0.621 mi: Concurrency terminus
