= National Register of Historic Places listings in Lee County, Kentucky =

Location of Lee County in Kentucky

This is a list of the National Register of Historic Places listings in Lee County, Kentucky.

It is intended to be a complete list of the properties on the National Register of Historic Places in Lee County, Kentucky, United States. The locations of National Register properties for which the latitude and longitude coordinates are included below, may be seen in a map.

There are 10 properties listed on the National Register in the county.

This National Park Service list is complete through NPS recent listings posted November 13, 2026.

== Current listings ==
	Name on the Register	Image	Date listed	Location	City or town	Description
1	Bear Track Petroglyphs (15LE112)		September 8, 1989 (#89001194)	Address Restricted	Mt. Olive	
2	Beattyville Grade School	Beattyville Grade School	February 7, 2008 (#08000010)	58 E. Center St. 37°34′22″N 83°42′17″W	Beattyville	
3	Beattyville Historic District	Beattyville Historic District	September 5, 2024 (#G100010769)	Main Street, HWY 11, Locust St, Center St, River Drive, Lumber Street, Madison Street, Railroad Street, Elm Street, Walnut Street, Bradford Street; 37°34′18″N 83°42′28″W	Beattyville	
4	Big Sinking Creek Turtle Rock Petroglyphs		January 2, 1992 (#91001888)	Address Restricted	Mt. Olive	
5	Cold Oak Shelter (15LE50)		August 14, 1996 (#96000877)	Address Restricted	Zachariah	
6	Old Landing Petroglyphs (15LE113)		September 8, 1989 (#89001195)	Address Restricted	Old Landing	
7	Perdue Petroglyphs (15LE111)		September 8, 1989 (#89001193)	Address Restricted	Fixer	
8	Pine Crest Shelter (15LE70)		August 14, 1996 (#96000878)	Address Restricted	Zachariah	
9	St. Therese Church	St. Therese Church	February 28, 2012 (#12000045)	4375 Kentucky Route 399; 37°35′42″N 83°46′52″W	Beattyville	
10	St. Thomas Episcopal Church	St. Thomas Episcopal Church	April 21, 1976 (#76000911)	Hill St. 37°34′30″N 83°42′35″W	Beattyville	

== See also ==
- List of National Historic Landmarks in Kentucky
- National Register of Historic Places listings in Kentucky
