= Kentucky Route 587 =

State highway in Kentucky, United States

Kentucky Route 587
- KY 587 highlighted in red

Route information
- Maintained by KYTC
- Length: 22.962 mi (36.954 km)

Major junctions
- West end: US 421 / Jackson County High School Road near Smith
- East end: KY 11 near Congleton

Location
- Country: United States
- State: Kentucky
- Counties: Jackson, Lee

Highway system
- Kentucky State Highway System; Interstate; US; State; Parkways
← KY 586	→ KY 588

Kentucky Route 587 (KY 587) is a 22.962-mile-long (36.954 km) state highway that travels from U.S. Route 421 (US 421) and Jackson County High School Road west of Smith to KY 11 southwest of Congleton via Smith, New Zion, Arvel, Delvinta, and Ida May.

== Major intersections ==
County	Location	mi	km	Destinations	Notes
Jackson		0.000	0.000	US 421 / Jackson County High School Road	Southern terminus; continues as Jackson County High School Road beyond US 421
Jackson		3.403	5.477	KY 3445 west (Privett Road)	Eastern terminus of KY 3445
Owsley–Lee county line	Arvel	10.743	17.289	KY 1209 north (Arvel Post Office Road)	Southern terminus of KY 1209
Lee		19.890	32.010	KY 399 south	South end of KY 399 overlap
Lee	Ida May	19.971	32.140	KY 399 north	North end of KY 399 overlap
Lee		22.962	36.954	KY 11	Northern terminus
1.000 mi = 1.609 km; 1.000 km = 0.621 mi: Concurrency terminus
