= Bellepoint =

Bellepoint or Belle Point may refer to:

- Belle Point, Kentucky, an unincorporated community in Lee County
- Bellepoint, Ohio, an unincorporated community
- Bellepoint, West Virginia, an unincorporated community in Summers County

== See also ==
- Bell Point
