= White ash =

== Flora ==
- Fraxinus americana, a species of tree native to eastern and central North America
- Fraxinus albicans, a species of tree native to eastern Texas and southern Oklahoma
- Eucalyptus fraxinoides, a species of Australian tree

== Towns ==
- White Ash, Kentucky, a town in the USA

== Other ==
- White Ash (band), a Japanese music band
