= Willow Shoals, Lee County, Kentucky =

Unincorporated community in Kentucky, United States

- Unincorporated community
- Location in Kentucky Location in the United States
- Coordinates: 37°35′28″N 83°48′49″W
- Country: United States
- State: Kentucky
- County: Lee
- Elevation: 679 ft (207 m)

Population
  - Total: 5
- Time zone: UTC-5 (Eastern (EST))
  - Summer (DST): UTC-4 (EST)
- ZIP codes: 41311
- Area code: 606
- FIPS code: 21129
- GNIS feature ID: 516390

Willow Shoals is an unincorporated community in Lee County, Kentucky, United States. Located about 2 miles above Lock and Dam #13 on the North Bank of the Kentucky River, at the mouth of Big Willow Shoals Branch, a Post Office was established at Willow Shoals on 20 September 1905 with John W. Stephenson as Postmaster. On 25 November 1905, the post office name was changed to Willow. The post office was discontinued in 1956, with mail then routed to Heidelberg, Kentucky. Willow Shoals (or Willow) appeared as a passenger stop on the Louisville and Atlantic Railroad, and later the Louisville and Nashville Railroad, until at least the 1930s. The tracks passing through Willow Shoals are currently owned by CSX Transportation, and are part of their now-idle Eastern Kentucky Subdivision. Little remains of the original town, with only one residence, two barns, and the building which once served as General Store, Post Office, and Railroad Depot still standing. On 14 July 2016, the place name was restored to Willow Shoals by the USGS Board of Geographic Names. Willow Shoals is within the boundaries of the Daniel Boone National Forest. Willow Shoals appeared in Season 10, Episode 6 of Homestead Rescue on the Discovery Channel.
