= Kentucky Route 498 =

State highway in Kentucky, United States

Kentucky Route 498
- KY 498 highlighted in red

Route information
- Maintained by KYTC
- Length: 2.464 mi (3.965 km)

Major junctions
- West end: KY 52 near Beattyville
- East end: KY 11 near Beattyville

Location
- Country: United States
- State: Kentucky
- Counties: Lee

Highway system
- Kentucky State Highway System; Interstate; US; State; Parkways
← KY 497	→ KY 499

Kentucky Route 498 (KY 498) is a 2.464-mile-long (3.965 km) state highway in Lee County, Kentucky that runs from Kentucky Route 52 to Kentucky Route 11 north of Beattyville.

== Major intersections ==
The entire route is in Lee County.

Location	mi	km	Destinations	Notes
	0.000	0.000	KY 52	Western terminus
	0.606	0.975	KY 1144 south (Fairgrounds Ridge Road)	Northern terminus of KY 1144
	2.464	3.965	KY 11	Eastern terminus
1.000 mi = 1.609 km; 1.000 km = 0.621 mi
