= Yellow Rock =

Yellow Rock may refer to:

- Yellow Rock, New South Wales (Blue Mountains), Australia
- Yellow Rock, New South Wales (Shellharbour), Australia
- Yellow Rock, Kentucky, United States
