= Cressmont =

Cressmont may refer to:

- Cressmont, Kentucky
- Cressmont, West Virginia
