= Standing Rock (disambiguation) =

Standing Rock is a Native American (American Indian) reservation in North Dakota and South Dakota.

Standing Rock may also refer to:

- Standing Rock, Alabama, a census-designated place and unincorporated community in Chambers County
- Standing Rock, Kentucky, an unincorporated community in Lee County
- Standing Rock of Eufaula, a landmark submerged with the creation of Lake Eufaula in Oklahoma
- Dakota Access Pipeline protests
