= Kentucky Route 399 =

Kentucky state highway

Kentucky Route 399
- KY 399 highlighted in red

Route information
- Maintained by KYTC
- Length: 15.522 mi (24.980 km)

Major junctions
- South end: KY 30 in Vincent
- KY 587 in Idamay
- North end: KY 52 in Daniel Boone National Forest

Location
- Country: United States
- State: Kentucky
- Counties: Owsley, Lee

Highway system
- Kentucky State Highway System; Interstate; US; State; Parkways
← KY 398	→ KY 400

Kentucky Route 399 (KY 399) is a 15.522-mile-long (24.980 km) state highway in the U.S. state of Kentucky. The highway connects mostly rural areas of Owsley and Lee counties with Vincent, Idamay, and Heidelberg.

== Route description ==
KY 399 begins at an intersection with KY 30 in Vincent, within the north-central part of Owsley County. It travels to the north-northwest and curves to the north-northeast. It begins paralleling Duck Fork and curves to the north-northwest before entering Lee County. KY 399 heads to the north-northeast and curves to the north-northwest. It enters Idamay, where it crosses over Duck Fork and has a brief concurrency with KY 587. The two highways cross over Duck Fork and then split. The highway resumes its north-northwesterly routing, now along the western edge of Daniel Boone National Forest. It crosses over Duck Fork twice and curves to the northwest, where Duck Fork merges into Sturgeon Creek. The highway begins paralleling that creek, curves to the north-northeast, and enters the national forest proper. It curves to the north-northwest and crosses over the Kentucky River on the Heidelberg Bridge. It crosses over some railroad tracks of CSX and curves to the west-northwest before entering Heidelberg. There, it curves to the north and leaves the community. The highway heads to the north-northeast and curves to the north-northwest. It heads in an easterly direction and meets its northern terminus, an intersection with KY 52.

== History ==
KY 399 was formed in 1954.

The original KY 399 ran from KY 398 west to Pennyrile Forest State Resort Park, but that is now Lodge Lane.

== Major intersections ==
County	Location	mi	km	Destinations	Notes
Owsley	Vincent	0.000	0.000	KY 30	Southern terminus
Lee	Idamay	3.758	6.048	KY 587 west	Southern end of KY 587 concurrency
Lee	Idamay	3.839	6.178	KY 587 east	Northern end of KY 587 concurrency; located within Daniel Boone National Forest
Lee	Daniel Boone National Forest	6.683	10.755	Heidelberg Bridge	Crossing of Kentucky River
Lee	Daniel Boone National Forest	15.522	24.980	KY 52	Northern terminus
1.000 mi = 1.609 km; 1.000 km = 0.621 mi
