= Woollum =

Woollum may refer to:

- Woollum, Kentucky, a community in Knox County
- Charlie Woollum, the former head coach of the Bucknell Bison men's basketball team
