= New Zion, Kentucky =

Unincorporated community in Kentucky, United States

- Unincorporated community
- Nickname: Muncie
- Location within Kentucky Location within the United States
- Coordinates: 37°28′15″N 83°53′45″W
- Country: United States
- State: Kentucky
- County: Jackson
- Elevation: 1,100 ft (340 m)
- Time zone: UTC-5 (Eastern (EST))
  - Summer (DST): UTC-4 (EST)
- ZIP codes: 40447
- Area code: 606
- GNIS feature ID

New Zion is an unincorporated community located in northeastern Jackson County, Kentucky, United States. The community is located on Kentucky Route 587, 6 miles northeast of McKee and 3 miles south of Arvel. In the community is New Zion Ridge.

A post office was established in the community in 1942, but it was closed in 1981.
