= Idamay =

Idamay and Ida May may refer to:

- Idamay, Kentucky, an unincorporated community and Coal town in Lee County
- Idamay, West Virginia, a census-designated place (CDP) in Marion County
- Ida May (skipjack), a Chesapeake Bay sloop
