= Lower Buffalo, Kentucky =

Unincorporated community in Kentucky, United States

- Unincorporated community
- Location in Kentucky Location in the United States
- Coordinates: 37°31′40″N 83°41′16″W
- Country: United States
- State: Kentucky
- County: Lee
- Elevation: 682 ft (208 m)
- Time zone: UTC-5 (Eastern (EST))
  - Summer (DST): UTC-4 (EDT)
- GNIS feature ID: 513676

Lower Buffalo is an unincorporated community in Lee County, Kentucky, United States.
