= Canyon Falls, Kentucky =

Unincorporated community in Kentucky, United States

- Unincorporated community
- Location in Kentucky Location in the United States
- Coordinates: 37°34′35″N 83°34′39″W
- Country: United States
- State: Kentucky
- County: Lee
- Elevation: 784 ft (239 m)
- Time zone: UTC-6 (Central (CST))
  - Summer (DST): UTC-5 (CST)
- GNIS feature ID: 488907

Canyon Falls is an unincorporated community in Lee County, Kentucky, United States.

A post office was established in 1909 at Canyon Falls. The community was named for a local canyon and waterfall; the latter was destroyed with dynamite for the construction of a road.
