= Leeco, Kentucky =

Unincorporated community in Kentucky, United States

- Unincorporated community
- Location in Kentucky Location in the United States
- Coordinates: 37°42′39″N 83°41′42″W
- Country: United States
- State: Kentucky
- County: Lee
- Elevation: 1,257 ft (383 m)
- Time zone: UTC-5 (Eastern (EST))
  - Summer (DST): UTC-4 (ETC)
- ZIP codes: 41343
- GNIS feature ID: 513296

Leeco is an unincorporated community in Lee County, Kentucky, United States. It is named as a concatenation of Lee Co(unty).
