= Williba, Kentucky =

Unincorporated community in Kentucky, United States

Coordinates: 37°37′23″N 83°34′09″W

Williba is an unincorporated community in Lee County, Kentucky, United States, located on Fraley Creek, one-half mile from the confluence of the North Fork and the Kentucky River.

Its post office opened on March 29, 1904, and was believed to have been originally named after Willoughby, England, from where the ancestors of the area's settlers were thought to have emigrated. The name "Williba" was supposedly a corruption adopted by its first postmaster to fit the name on a rubber stamp. The post office was later closed.
