= Arvel, Kentucky =

Unincorporated community in Kentucky, United States

- Unincorporated community
- Location within Kentucky Location within the United States
- Coordinates: 37°31′06″N 83°53′07″W
- Country: United States
- State: Kentucky
- County: Jackson, Lee, Owsley
- Elevation: 1,211 ft (369 m)
- Time zone: UTC-5 (Eastern (EST))
  - Summer (DST): UTC-4 (EST)
- ZIP codes: 40447 (McKee), 41311 (Beattyville)
- Area code: 606
- GNIS feature ID

Arvel is an unincorporated community located near the tripoint border between Jackson, Lee, and Owsley Counties, Kentucky, United States. The community is located at the junction of Kentucky Route 587 and Kentucky Route 1209, 8 miles northeast of McKee and 13 miles southwest of Beattyville. A few locations in Arvel are also named Old Orchard, such as the Old Orchard Lookout Tower, which is 1/3 of a mile from Arvel and a historical school being the same distance from Arvel which may be evidence of the community also being called Old Orchard. A natural attraction in the area is Alcorn Branch Falls.
