= Zacharia, Kentucky =

Unincorporated community in Kentucky, United States

- Unincorporated community
- Location in Kentucky Location in the United States
- Coordinates: 37°42′18″N 83°41′1″W
- Country: United States
- State: Kentucky
- County: Lee
- Elevation: 1,240 ft (380 m)
- Time zone: UTC-5 (Eastern (EST))
  - Summer (DST): UTC-4 (EDT)
- GNIS feature ID: 516523

Zacharia is an unincorporated community in Lee County, Kentucky, United States.
