= Sharpsburg, Kentucky =

- City
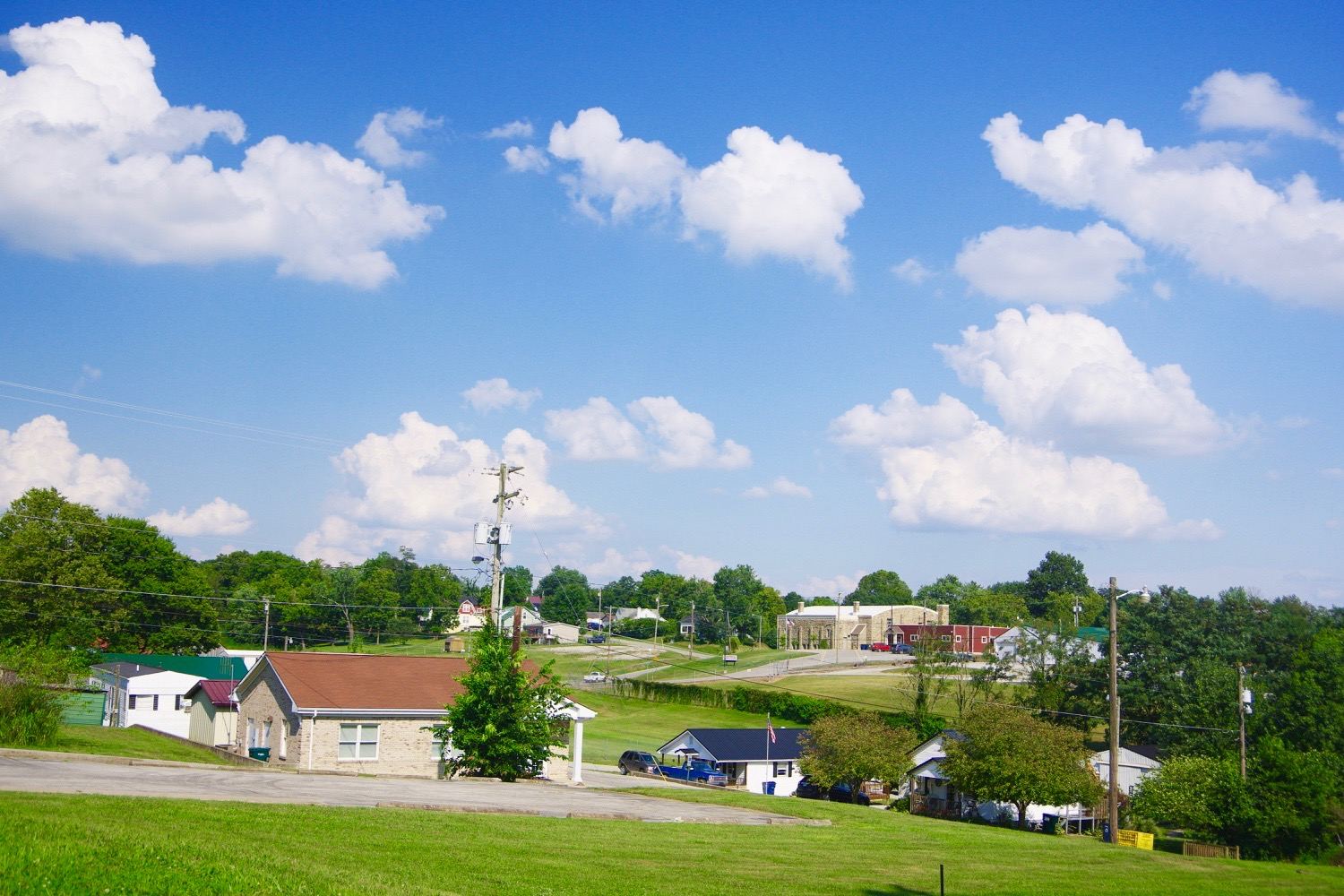
- Sharpsburg

- Location of Sharpsburg in Bath County, Kentucky.
- Coordinates: 38°12′06″N 83°55′41″W
- Country: United States
- State: Kentucky
- County: Bath
- Established: 1825
- Incorporated: 1852
- Named after: a local landowner

Government
  - Type: Mayor and City Commissioners

Area
  - Total: 0.20 sq mi (0.51 km^{2})
  - Land: 0.20 sq mi (0.51 km^{2})
  - Water: 0 sq mi (0.00 km^{2})
- Elevation: 1,014 ft (309 m)

Population (2020)
  - Total: 365
  - Density: 1,852.6/sq mi (715.31/km^{2})
- Time zone: UTC-5 (Eastern (EST))
  - Summer (DST): UTC-4 (EDT)
- ZIP code: 40374
- Area code: 606
- FIPS code: 21-69852
- GNIS feature ID: 2405450

Sharpsburg is a home rule-class city in Bath County, Kentucky, in the United States. The population was 365 as of the 2020 census. It is part of the Mount Sterling micropolitan area.

== History ==
Revolutionary War veteran Moses Sharp settled in the area in 1780 and laid out the town of Bloomfield on his land in 1814. After his death in 1820, the town received its first post office; since "Bloomfield" was preempted by another community, the postmaster named his station after Sharp, and the town was established and incorporated under this new name.

== Geography ==
Sharpsburg is located near the western corner of Bath County along Kentucky Route 11. It is 11 miles (18 km) north of Mount Sterling and 20 miles (32 km) southwest of Flemingsburg. According to the United States Census Bureau, the city has a total area of 0.2 square miles (0.52 km^{2}), all of it land.

== Demographics ==
Historical population
Census	Pop.	Note	%±
1830	158		—
1870	319		—
1880	356		11.6%
1890	516		44.9%
1900	482		−6.6%
1910	410		−14.9%
1920	363		−11.5%
1930	408		12.4%
1940	472		15.7%
1950	405		−14.2%
1960	311		−23.2%
1970	307		−1.3%
1980	339		10.4%
1990	315		−7.1%
2000	295		−6.3%
2010	323		9.5%
2020	365		13.0%
U.S. Decennial Census

As of the census of 2000, there were 295 people, 149 households, and 77 families residing in the city. The population density was 1,559.6 inhabitants per square mile (602.2/km^{2}). There were 154 housing units at an average density of 814.2 per square mile (314.4/km^{2}). The racial makeup of the city was 76.61% White, 20.00% African American, 1.69% from other races, and 1.69% from two or more races. Hispanic or Latino of any race were 1.69% of the population.

There were 149 households, out of which 16.1% had children under the age of 18 living with them, 39.6% were married couples living together, 10.1% had a female householder with no husband present, and 48.3% were non-families. 46.3% of all households were made up of individuals, and 29.5% had someone living alone who was 65 years of age or older. The average household size was 1.98 and the average family size was 2.71.

In the city, the population was spread out, with 16.9% under the age of 18, 7.1% from 18 to 24, 24.4% from 25 to 44, 25.1% from 45 to 64, and 26.4% who were 65 years of age or older. The median age was 46 years. For every 100 females, there were 82.1 males. For every 100 females age 18 and over, there were 85.6 males.

The median income for a household in the city was $16,000, and the median income for a family was $23,750. Males had a median income of $22,188 versus $20,000 for females. The per capita income for the city was $12,452. About 26.7% of families and 32.7% of the population were below the poverty line, including 37.3% of those under the age of eighteen and 35.1% of those 65 or over.

== Education ==
Sharpsburg has a public library, a branch of the Bath County Memorial Library.

== Notable people ==
- Henry Tureman Allen, WWI general
- Henry S. Lane, governor of Indiana
