= St. Therese Catholic Church (Beattyville, Kentucky) =

Historic church in Kentucky, United States

- St. Therese Church
- U.S. National Register of Historic Places
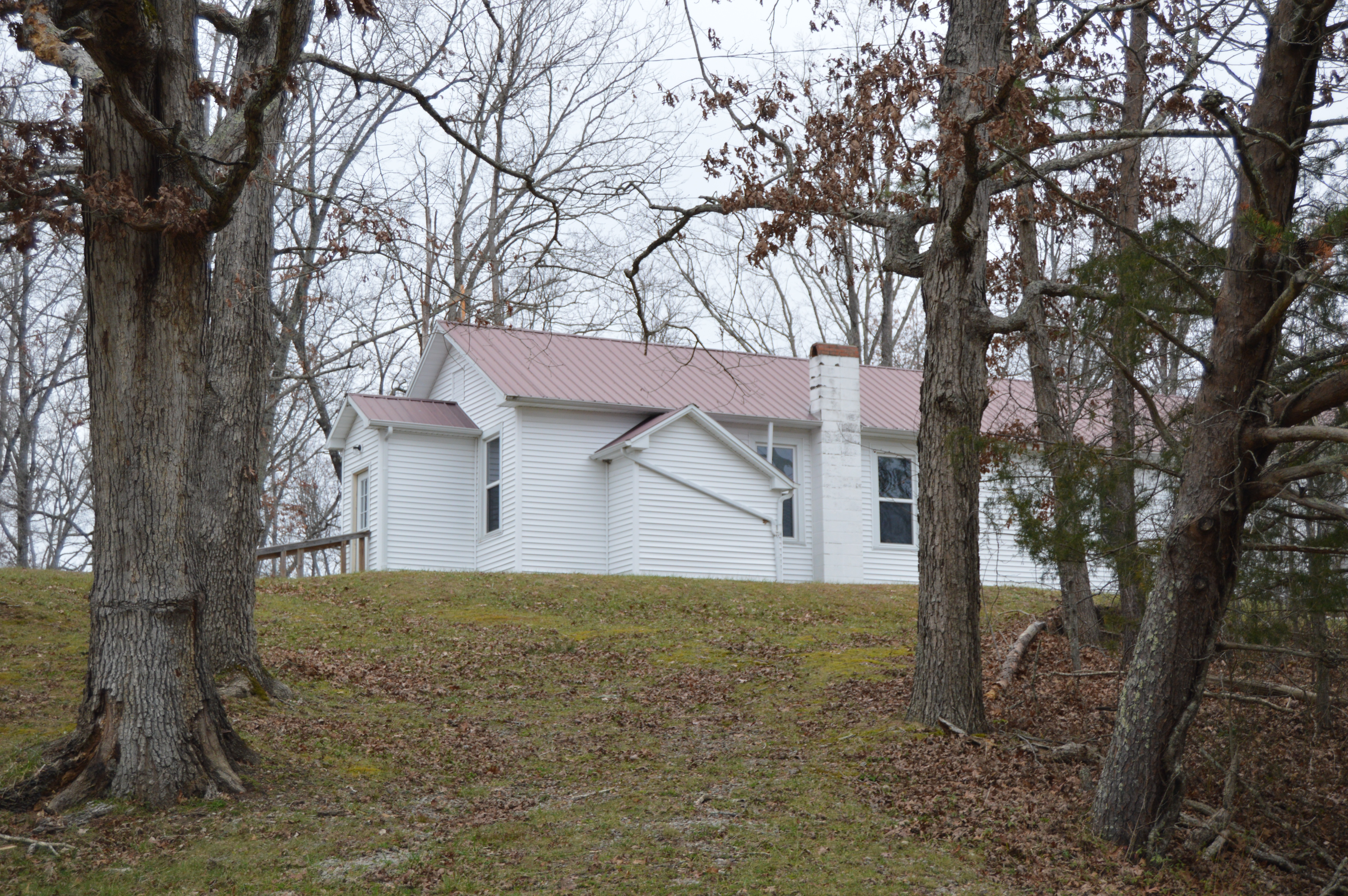
- Location: 4375 Kentucky Route 399, 4 miles (6.4 km) northwest of Beattyville, Kentucky
- Coordinates: 37°35′42″N 83°46′52″W
- Area: 1 acre (0.40 ha)
- Built: 1948
- NRHP reference No.: 12000045
- Added to NRHP: February 28, 2012

St. Therese Church, west of Beattyville, Kentucky, was listed on the National Register of Historic Places in 2012.

It is a wood-frame church on a concrete block foundation. It was built in 1948 from materials of the Contrary Creek Settlement School Church, a previous church located about a mile away, which had been built in the 1920s. The new church was built to a different design. Kitchen and living quarters for Catholic nuns and for the circuit-riding priest were added.
