= Athol, Kentucky =

Unincorporated community in Kentucky, United States

- Unincorporated community
- Location in Kentucky Location in the United States
- Coordinates: 37°33′9″N 83°33′46″W
- Country: United States
- State: Kentucky
- County: Lee
- Elevation: 761 ft (232 m)
- Time zone: UTC-5 (Eastern (EST))
  - Summer (DST): UTC-4 (EDT)
- ZIP codes: 41307
- GNIS feature ID: 507424

Athol is an unincorporated community in Lee County, Kentucky, United States. It lies along Route 52 east of the city of Beattyville, the county seat of Lee County. Its elevation is 761 feet (232 m). It has a post office with the ZIP code 41307.
