= Zoe, Kentucky =

Unincorporated community in Kentucky, United States

- Unincorporated community
- Location in Kentucky Location in the United States
- Coordinates: 37°40′49″N 83°41′3″W
- Country: United States
- State: Kentucky
- County: Lee
- Elevation: 1,145 ft (349 m)
- Time zone: UTC-5 (Eastern (EST))
  - Summer (DST): UTC-4 (EDT)
- ZIP codes: 41397
- GNIS feature ID: 516536

Zoe is an unincorporated community in Lee County, Kentucky, United States. It lies north of the city of Beattyville, the county seat of Lee County, along Route 11. Its elevation is 1,145 feet (349 m). It has a post office with the ZIP code 41397.
