= Three Forks, Kentucky =

Three Forks, Kentucky, may refer to:

- Park City, Kentucky, an incorporated city in Barren Co. formerly known as Three Forks
- Three Forks, Warren County, Kentucky, an unincorporated community
- Saint Helens, Kentucky, an unincorporated community in Lee Co. also known as Three Forks
