= Enoch, Kentucky =

Unincorporated community in Kentucky, United States

- Unincorporated community
- Location in Kentucky Location in the United States
- Coordinates: 37°32′36″N 83°40′32″W
- Country: United States
- State: Kentucky
- County: Lee
- Elevation: 758 ft (231 m)
- Time zone: UTC-6 (Central (CST))
  - Summer (DST): UTC-5 (CST)
- GNIS feature ID: 512077

Enoch is an unincorporated community in Lee County, Kentucky, United States.
