= Maloney, Kentucky =

Unincorporated community in Kentucky, United States

- Unincorporated community
- Location in Kentucky Location in the United States
- Coordinates: 37°34′57″N 83°40′29″W
- Country: United States
- State: Kentucky
- County: Lee
- Elevation: 722 ft (220 m)
- Time zone: UTC-5 (Eastern (EST))
  - Summer (DST): UTC-4 (EDT)
- GNIS feature ID: 513765

Maloney is an unincorporated community in Lee County, Kentucky, United States. Originally the location of the William Bryant Maloney's farm, the train tracks passed by the farm before crossing the North Fork Kentucky River at Sharp Rock (locally known place where a triangular "sharp" rock sticks out of the River near the turn of the bend). Maloney family added a train stop, a water pumping station, and a mail drop. Because of the difficulty of turning larger trains around at Natural Bridge, Maloney added a train wye designed to turn the larger engines around. Eventually, the train stop, the bend in the river, and the bridge gained the Maloney name: Maloney, Maloney Bend, and Maloney Railroad Bridge.
