= Saint Helens, Kentucky =

Unincorporated community in Kentucky, United States

- Unincorporated community
- Location in Kentucky Location in the United States
- Coordinates: 37°34′58″N 83°38′50″W
- Country: United States
- State: Kentucky
- County: Lee
- Elevation: 728 ft (222 m)
- Time zone: UTC-5 (Eastern (EST))
  - Summer (DST): UTC-4 (EDT)
- ZIP codes: 41368
- GNIS feature ID: 515175

Saint Helens is an unincorporated community in Lee County, Kentucky, in the United States. It lies along Route 52 east of the city of Beattyville, the county seat of Lee County. Its elevation is 728 feet (222 m). It has a post office with the ZIP code 41368. This post office preëmpted the naming of a community in Jefferson County as Saint Helens; instead, it had to adopt the name "Shively" after an early settler.

This Lee County community is also sometimes (unofficially) known as Three Forks.

== See also ==
- Other places named Three Forks, Kentucky
