= Clay City National Bank Building =

- U.S. National Register of Historic Places
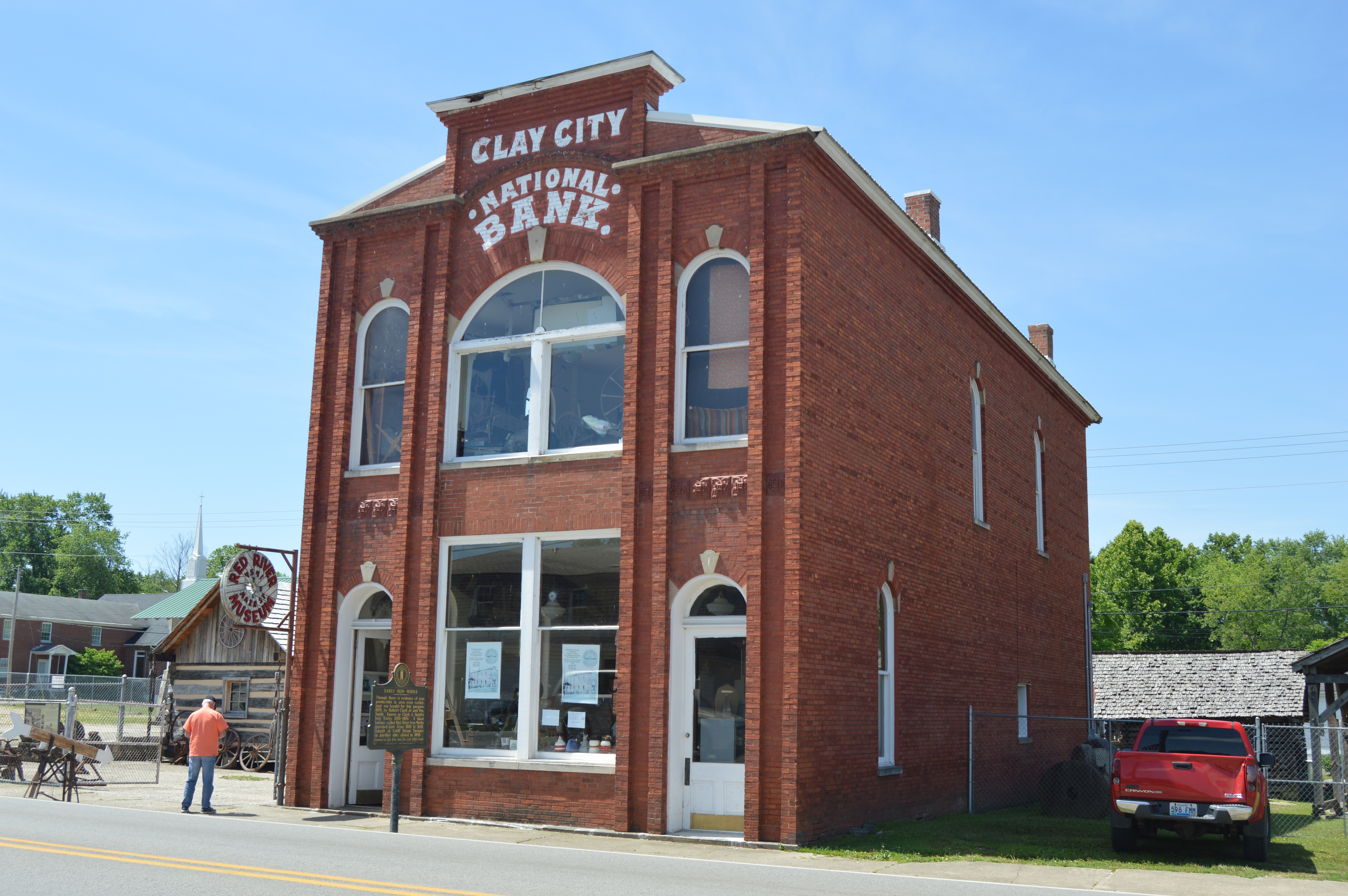

- Location within Kentucky Location within the United States
- Location: 6th Ave., Clay City, Kentucky
- Coordinates: 37°51′38″N 83°55′16″W
- Area: 1 acre (0.40 ha)
- Built: 1890
- NRHP reference No.: 76000940
- Added to NRHP: July 13, 1976

The Clay City National Bank Building, located on 6th Ave. in Clay City, Kentucky, was built in 1890. It was listed on the National Register of Historic Places in 1976.

It is a two-story brick building, 28 by 65 feet (8.5 m × 19.8 m) in plan. Its front is three bays wide.

It has served as the Red River Historical Museum.

It was noted to be "one of the few nineteenth-century buildings to survive in Clay City and the most substantial early structure remaining on the main thoroughfare of the town."
