= Delvinta, Kentucky =

Unincorporated community in Kentucky, United States

- Unincorporated community
- Location in Kentucky Location in the United States
- Coordinates: 37°30′3″N 83°47′38″W
- Country: United States
- State: Kentucky
- County: Lee
- Elevation: 1,024 ft (312 m)
- Time zone: UTC-6 (Central (CST))
  - Summer (DST): UTC-5 (CST)
- GNIS feature ID: 511780

Delvinta is an unincorporated community in Lee County, Kentucky, United States.

The retired post office was established in 1898. Delvinta was named by the spouse of the first postmaster, who was an avid vintner, meaning "a place of vines".
