= Fixer, Kentucky =

Unincorporated area in Kentucky

- Unincorporated community
- Location in Kentucky Location in the United States
- Coordinates: 37°40′41″N 83°43′6″W
- Country: United States
- State: Kentucky
- County: Lee
- Elevation: 879 ft (268 m)
- Time zone: UTC-5 (Eastern (EST))
  - Summer (DST): UTC-4 (EDT)
- GNIS feature ID: 512178

Fixer is an unincorporated community in Lee County, Kentucky, United States, on Big Sinking Creek and 6 1/2 miles north of Beattyville.

A post office was established in the community in 1916. According to legend, it was given the name Fixer by an exasperated resident, George W. Booth, who after submitting several rejected entries to postal authorities, declared that he was done suggesting place names and if the post office didn't like it, they could "fix 'er" themselves.
