= Yellow Rock, Kentucky =

Unincorporated community in Kentucky, United States

- Unincorporated community
- Location in Kentucky Location in the United States
- Coordinates: 37°34′15″N 83°48′18″W
- Country: United States
- State: Kentucky
- County: Lee
- Elevation: 659 ft (201 m)
- Time zone: UTC-6 (Eastern (EST))
  - Summer (DST): UTC-5 (CST)
- GNIS feature ID: 516505

Yellow Rock is an unincorporated community in Lee County, Kentucky, United States.
