= Bellepoint, West Virginia =

Bellepoint
- Unincorporated community
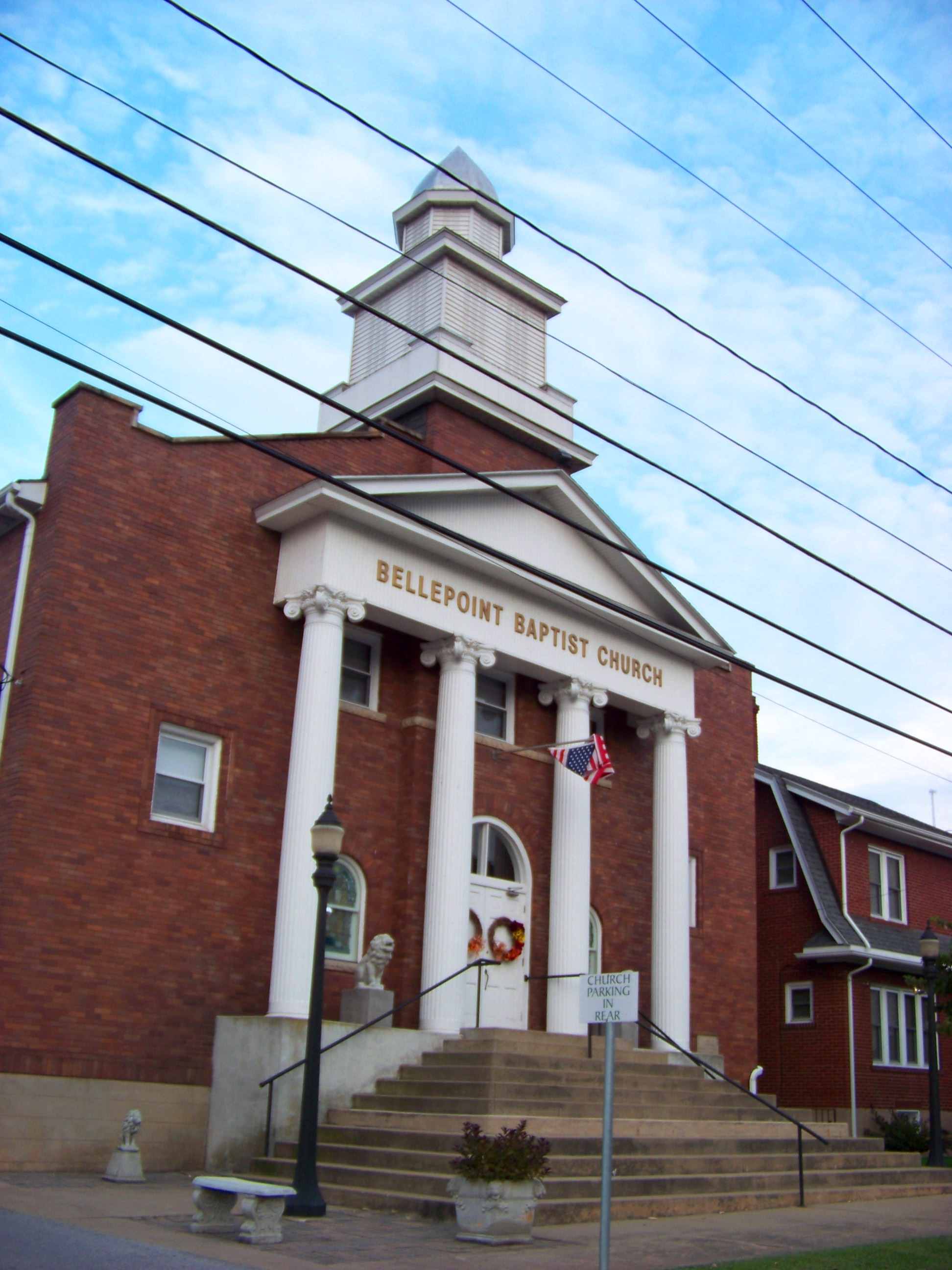
- Bellepoint Baptist Church

- Location within the state of West Virginia
- Coordinates: 37°39′0″N 80°52′13″W
- Country: United States
- State: West Virginia
- County: Summers
- Elevation: 653 ft (199 m)
- Time zone: UTC-5 (Eastern (EST))
  - Summer (DST): UTC-4 (EDT)
- FIPS code: 1553847

Bellepoint was an unincorporated community located in Summers County, West Virginia, United States. Bellepoint was later merged into Hinton; however, it had its own post office, as seen in the image below.

== History ==
Bellepoint was established at the same time as Hinton.

== Geography ==
Bellepoint is located at a connection between the Greenbrier River to the north and the New River to the south. West Virginia Route 3 (Greenbrier Drive) runs on the north side of Bellepoint, next to the Greenbrier River. Riverside Drive runs on the south end next to the New River.

== Landmarks ==
Landmarks of Bellepoint include the Bluestone Dam, which was built in 1949 to control flooding and to form the Bluestone Lake. This lake is the source of drinking water for much of Summers County and parts of Mercer County. There is also a recreational centre which has two baseball fields, a basketball court, tennis court and a playground.
