= Collins Creek (Kentucky) =

River in Kentucky, United States

Physical characteristics
- Source: Collins Fork headwaters
  - coordinates: 36°57′56″N 83°52′27″W
- 2nd source: Buzzard Branch headwaters
  - coordinates: 37°01′15″N 83°46′20″W
- 3rd source: Hammond Fork headwaters
  - coordinates: 37°01′21″N 83°44′46″W
- Mouth: Goose Creek
  - coordinates: 37°07′13″N 83°45′06″W
  - elevation: 800 feet (240 m)

Collins Creek, also known as Collins Fork, is a creek that is a fork of Goose Creek in Knox County and Clay County, Kentucky. It is 19 miles (31 km) long; is named for its first settler James Collins, a salt maker and hunter; joins Goose just south of Garrard; and is paralleled by (Kentucky Route 11) road and (Cumberland and Manchester Railroad branch of the L&N) railway for most of its course.

== Tributaries and post offices ==
The mouth of Collins Fork is 2.5 miles (4.0 km) upstream of Manchester at altitude 800 feet (240 m) above sea level. 9 miles (14 km) of it is Knox County and 10 miles (16 km) in Clay County.

- Its major tributaries are:
  - Engine Branch 1 mile (1.6 km) upstream, mouth 37°06′34″N 83°45′15″W
  - Buzzard Creek 2.25 miles (3.62 km) upstream at altitude 815 feet (248 m) and 7.5 miles (12.1 km) long, mouth 37°05′39″N 83°45′19″W
    - Furnace Branch (a.k.a. Little Buzzard Creek) 1.375 miles (2.213 km) upstream at altitude 830 feet (250 m)
    - Saplings Fork 1.5 miles (2.4 km) upstream at altitude 830 feet (250 m), mouth 37°04′49″N 83°44′37″W
    - Swafford Branch 2.5 miles (4.0 km) upstream at altitude 860 feet (260 m), mouth 37°03′59″N 83°44′31″W
    - Sarvis Branch 4.5 miles (7.2 km) upstream at altitude 910 feet (280 m), mouth 37°02′59″N 83°44′20″W
    - Russell Branch 2.75 miles (4.43 km) upstream at altitude 930 feet (280 m), mouth 37°02′46″N 83°44′50″W
  - Joe Nash Branch 4 miles (6.4 km) upstream at altitude 824 feet (251 m)
  - Aery Branch (a.k.a. Ayres Branch) 4.25 miles (6.84 km) upstream at altitude 825 feet (251 m)
  - Old Stable Branch 4.75 miles (7.64 km) upstream at altitude 830 feet (250 m)
  - Ingram Branch (a.k.a. Cottongill Branch) 5 miles (8.0 km) upstream at altitude 830 feet (250 m)
  - Whites Creek (a.k.a. Whites Branch) 6.125 miles (9.857 km) upstream at altitude 840 feet (260 m), mouth 37°03′42″N 83°48′11″W
  - Cold Spring Branch 7.5 miles (12.1 km) upstream at altitude 849 feet (259 m), mouth 37°02′44″N 83°48′27″W
  - Disappointment Branch 10 miles (16 km) upstream at altitude 855 feet (261 m), mouth 37°00′50″N 83°49′04″W
  - Wells Branch 11.25 miles (18.11 km) upstream at altitude 880 feet (270 m)
  - Bull Creek (a.k.a. Bull Branch) 11.75 miles (18.91 km) upstream at altitude 860 feet (260 m) and 4.5 miles (7.2 km) long, mouth 36°59′24″N 83°49′51″W
    - Turkey Branch 1.25 miles (2.01 km) upstream
    - Upper Turkey Branch 1.75 miles (2.82 km) upstream
  - Hammond Fork 12 miles (19 km) upstream at altitude 860 feet (260 m) and 7.5 miles (12.1 km) long, mouth 36°59′08″N 83°49′38″W
    - Horn Branch 2 miles (3.2 km) upstream at altitude 880 feet (270 m), mouth 36°59′09″N 83°48′06″W
    - Shop Branch 4.5 miles (7.2 km) upstream at altitude 910 feet (280 m), mouth 36°59′17″N 83°46′38″W
    - Garland Branch 5.5 miles (8.9 km) upstream at altitude 930 feet (280 m)
    - Left Fork 6 miles (9.7 km) upstream at altitude 940 feet (290 m)
    - Hi Smith Branch (a.k.a. Right Fork) 6 miles (9.7 km) upstream at altitude 940 feet (290 m)

=== On Buzzard Creek ===
Willowdale postoffice was established on 1901-09-07 by postmaster Ella White. She named it for the preponderance of willow trees in the area, which was likely at the mouth of Furnace Branch/Saplings Fork.

Lincoln postoffice was established on 1923-05-26 by postmaster Hughey L. Tanksley. His original choice of name was Harding, which clashed with an already existing Hardin postoffice in Marshall County, his choices of names presumed to be politically inspired by Republican Presidents Abraham Lincoln and Warren G. Harding. It was originally located 4.5 miles (7.2 km) upstream from Buzzard Creek mouth, moved 1 mile downstream in 1945, and closed in 1974.

In 1918, Thomas Swafford had a mine 2.5 miles (4.0 km) upstream on Swafford Branch, Margaret Swafford had on 1.75 miles (2.82 km) upstream on Saevis Branch, and Wade Swafford had one 0.5 miles (0.80 km) upstream on Turkey Branch.

A gap at the headwaters of Buzzard leads to Horn Branch.

=== On Hammond Fork ===
The Abel post office was established on 1896-02-18 by postmaster Sarah E. Jones. It was located at the mouth of the Shop Branch of Hammond, and closed in January 1897.

The Williams post office was established by postmaster Isaac Mills on 1906-03-29. Mills had asked for both Abel and Sal as names, before Williams was accepted by the USPS. It closed on 1907-02-15.

=== On Bull Creek ===
Sprule post office was established on 1905-04-06 by postmaster Leander D. Jarvis. It was named after a local Sprule (or possibly Sproul) family. The local community that it served was named Hemlock. Over its life it occupied several sites on Bull and its tributaries, including at the creek mouth; one of its postmasters was Henry W. Cobb; and it closed in 1983.

=== On Collins Creek itself ===
Safe postoffice was established on 1904-06-18 by postmaster Emmet Lee Walker. Located in a store just upstream of Engine Branch, it lasted until 1907-04-15.

Cottongim postoffice was established on 1918-07-03 by postmaster Sallie Cottongim Hacker. She named it for the family of her parents, John Lucas Cottongim and Susan Smith Cottongim, and grandparent Pierce Cottongim (born 1792) who had come to Clay County from South Carolina. Her first choice of name had been Jonsee, named after the Jonsee railway station that it served and was only a few hundred yards away from. The railway station in turn was named after John C. White, "John C." to "Jonsee", landowner from whom the railway company had bought land rights in 1916. The postoffice became a rural branch in 1963, and closed in 1969.

In 1918, John L. Cottongill had a mine 6 miles (9.7 km) upstream on Collins between Cottongill and Whites Branches.

The Dallas post office was established on 1909-05-05 by postmaster William Martin. He had originally wanted Martin, but that was rejected by the USPS for being already in use in Lewis County. It was not on Collins Fork proper, but on an unnamed tributary that was, per the details of the application, 5 miles (8.0 km) northeast of the (second) Hopper post office (see below). It closed in November 1912.

The Criss post office was established on 1917-07-20 by postmaster John M. Cole. It was named after a local person of that name, details of whom are unknown. This was 2 miles (3.2 km) downstream of Fount (see below). It closed in September 1925.

The Woollum post office was established on 1900-03-05 by the eponymous postmaster Samuel J. Woollum. Woollum had originally wanted the name Cotton. It was originally located 2 miles (3.2 km) north of the Knox-Clay county border, and had moved south to within 700 feet (210 m) of that border by 1909, by which time the pastmaster was S. A. Blevins. Postmaster Henry W. Cobb (of the aftermentioned Sprule) moved it across the border, to a site 500 feet (150 m) from it on the other side, on 1924-10-06, putting it 1 mile (1.6 km) north of Criss. It moved several more times along Collins Fork over its lifetime, eventually ending back 0.5 miles (0.80 km) north of the border in Clay County again. It closed on 1993-08-27.

The Green Road post office was established on 1927-11-30 by postmaster Alice Hammons. It was at the mouth of Buncker Branch, 0.5 miles (0.80 km) south of Green Road Station on the C&M railroad. It closed on 1985-08-17. It has been hypothesized that the railway station name comes from the Greenbriar Branch and Green Branch minor tributaries of Collins Fork, but nothing is known for certain.

Fielding Hamming had a mine 2 miles (3.2 km) upstream on Horn Branch.

==== Bluehole post office ====
Bluehole post office was established on 1916-08-04, originally to be named Gladys, the choice of name preferred by its first postmaster Charles S. Townsley. However, that name clashed with a postoffice in Lawrence County and his next preference was Bluehole (after the common Kentucky geographic feature of a blue hole).

It was originally located 2.5 miles (4.0 km) up Buzzard Creek, at approximately the site of the Lower Buzzard School, but only lasted at that location until its first closure in August 1917. Its next postmaster, Ella Perkins, re-located it nearer to the new railway station of Rodonnel, placing it 2 miles (3.2 km) up Collins Creek on 1918-05-01, and from then until its closure in 1985 it was located at several places along Collins Creek and Kentucky Route 11.

The name is still used informally for the area where the various post offices were, rather than the name of the railway station.

==== Hopper and Fount post offices ====
The first Hopper post office was established on 1891-11-27 by postmaster Columbus Troubman at the mouth of Hammond Fork. It was named after the descendants of post-Civil War landowner Blaggrove B. Hopper. It closed in October 1893.

The Fount post office started out as the Payne's post office, not on Collins Creek at all but somewhere between the Richland Creek and Little Richland Creek forks of the Cumberland River. It was established on 1874-07-13 by postmaster Dutton Jones, who owned a local flour mill. Postmaster and storekeeper Louis Henderson Jones relocated it in 1881 onto Collins Fork, the location specified as 2 miles (3.2 km) north-east of its prior location and 3 miles (4.8 km) east of a Jarvis Store post office. In its vicinity were Jones's own store, a second store, several other businesses, and some mills.

Jones changed its name to Girdler in January 1888 after descendants of Civil War veteran James Girdler from Pennsylvania who had lived in Pulaski County and died there in 1842. Postmaster Tyre Y. Marcum relocated and renamed it yet again in 1895, to the site of the earlier Hopper post office, giving it the same name.

The C&M railway arrived at Hopper in 1916, by which time a sawmill, a factory, a school, and several stores, shops, and churches had all grown up around the two Hopper post offices. In 1883 a Nancy Anne Hopper had married Fountain Fox Rowland, a storekeeper in Laurel County who had taken over as postmaster of the Hopper post office in January 1907. Rowland was the railroad's station agent, and moved Hopper post office to the station in May 1916, renaming it Fount after himself on 1916-06-21. Fount closed in 1974.

==== Girdler ====
The second Girdler post office was a reestablishment, after the prior post office moved downstream and changed name, on 1899-04-28 by postmaster Millard Hibbard. It was initially 3 miles (4.8 km) upstream of (the second) Hopper, but by 1915 had moved further south to a position in-between Collins Fork and Little Richland Fork, 4 miles (6.4 km) of Hubbard the second (soon to become Fount). It still exists there today, at the junction of Kentucky Route 11 (which leaves the course of Collins Fork just to the north) and Kentucky Route 1304. Around it are a school, several stores, and a sawmill.

== See also ==
- List of rivers of Kentucky

== Sources ==
- Hodge, James Michael (1918). The coals of Goose Creek and its tributaries. Reports of the Kentucky Geological Survey 4th series 1912–1918. Vol. 4. Frankfort, Kentucky: The State Journal Company. (The coals of Goose Creek and its tributaries at the Internet Archive)
- Rennick, Robert M. (2000c). Clay County — Post Offices. County Histories of Kentucky. Vol. 176. Morehead State University.
- Rennick, Robert M. (2000). Knox County — Post Offices. County Histories of Kentucky. Vol. 390. Morehead State University.
