= First Presbyterian Church (Flemingsburg, Kentucky) =

Historic church in Kentucky, United States

- U.S. National Register of Historic Places
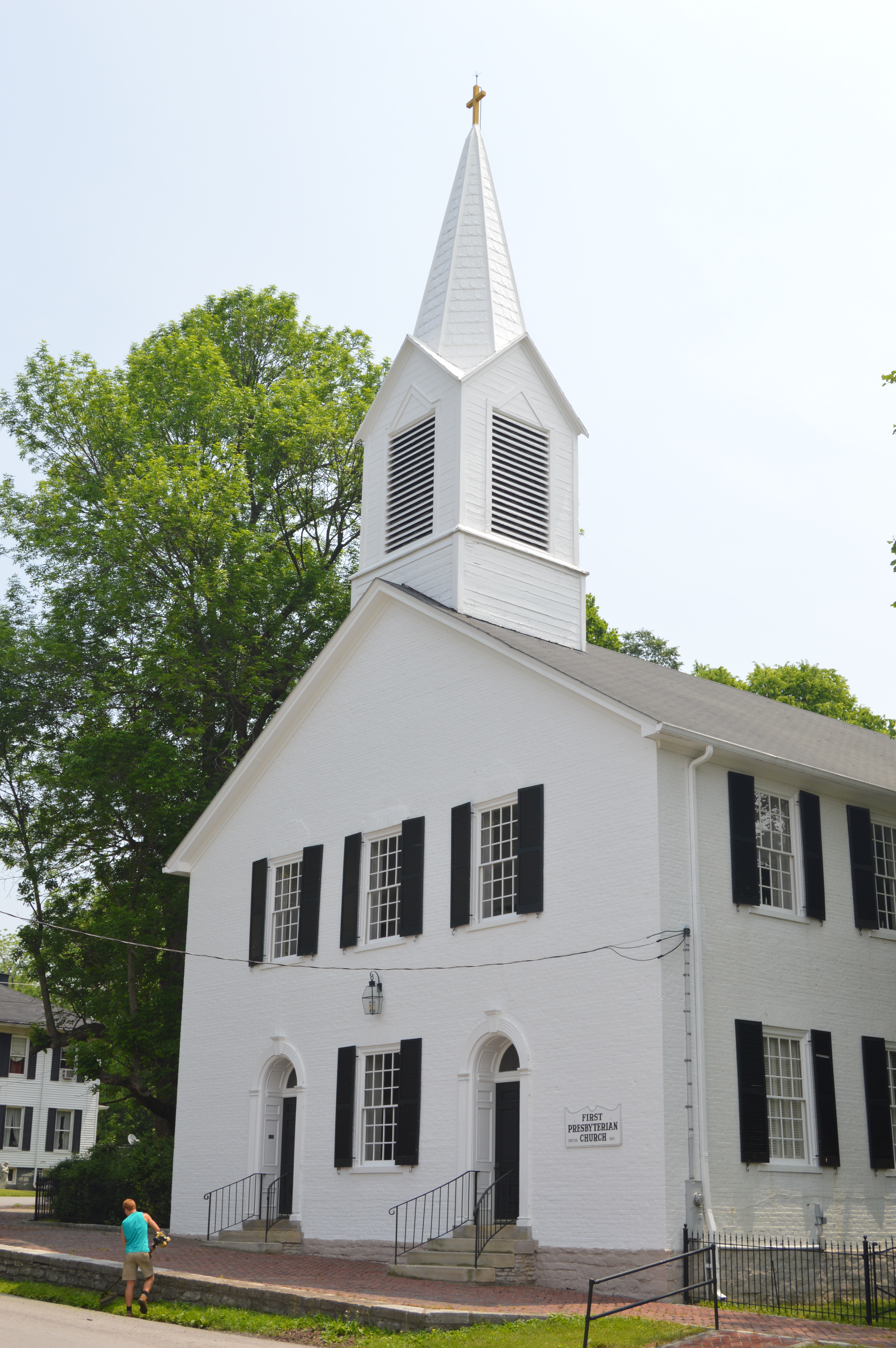
- Front and southern side

- Location within Kentucky Location within the United States
- Location: W. Main and W. Water Sts., Flemingsburg, Kentucky
- Coordinates: 38°25′28″N 83°44′10″W
- Area: 0.5 acres (0.20 ha)
- Built: 1819
- Architect: Stockwell, Samuel; Eckles, John
- NRHP reference No.: 77000617
- Added to NRHP: August 12, 1977

The First Presbyterian Church in Flemingsburg, Kentucky is a historic church at W. Main and W. Water Streets. It was built in 1819 and added to the National Register in 1977.

It is notable as it is "one of the oldest Presbyterian meeting houses in the State, and is the major known surviving work of the fine local architect-builders, Samuel Stockwell and John Eckles."

== See also ==
- National Register of Historic Places listings in Kentucky
