= Conkling, Kentucky =

Unincorporated community in Kentucky, United States

Conkling
- Unincorporated community
- Location within the state of Kentucky Conkling (the United States)
- Coordinates: 37°22′53″N 83°41′24″W
- Country: United States
- State: Kentucky
- County: Owsley
- Elevation: 738 ft (225 m)
- Time zone: UTC-5 (Eastern (EST))
  - Summer (DST): UTC-4 (EDT)
- GNIS feature ID: 511500

Conkling is an unincorporated community located in Owsley County, Kentucky, United States. Its post office closed in December 1972.
