= Beattyville Grade School =

- U.S. National Register of Historic Places
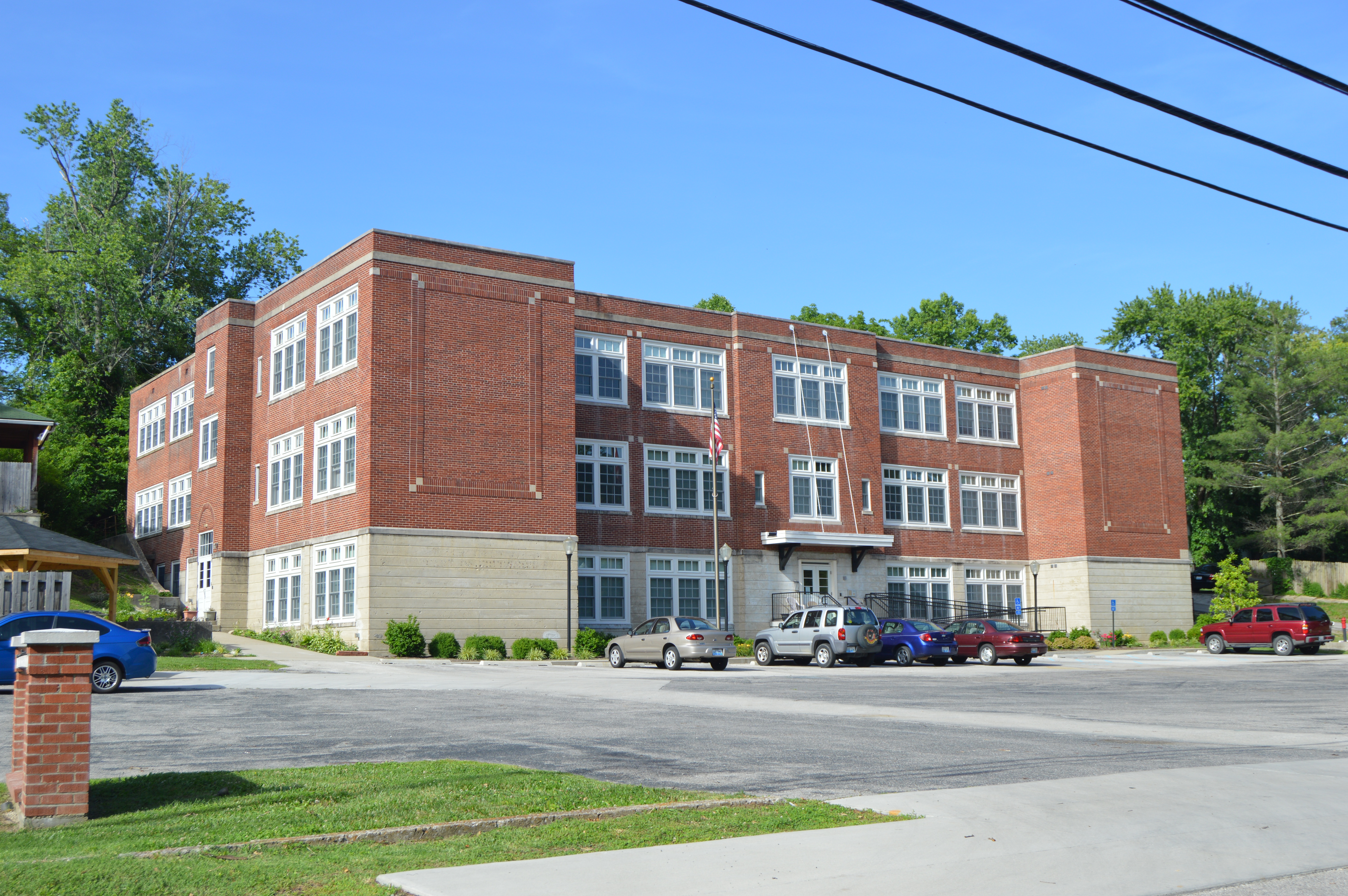

- Location within Kentucky Location within the United States
- Location: 58 E. Center St., Beattyville, Kentucky
- Coordinates: 37°34′22″N 83°42′17″W
- Area: 1.2 acres (0.49 ha)
- Built: 1940
- Architects: Gillig, John T.; Churchill, H.A.
- Architectural style: Late 19th and 20th Century Revivals
- NRHP reference No.: 08000010
- Added to NRHP: February 7, 2008

The Beattyville Grade School, located at 58 E. Center St. in Beattyville, Kentucky, was listed on the National Register of Historic Places in 2008.

It was built in 1940 according to the NRIS database, and in 1926 according to a housing rental website. It was converted into 18 apartments.

It originally served grades 1–12, then served grades 10-5 until 1969.
