= White Ash, Kentucky =

Unincorporated community in Kentucky, United States

- Unincorporated community
- Location in Kentucky Location in the United States
- Coordinates: 37°33′23″N 83°44′12″W
- Country: United States
- State: Kentucky
- County: Lee
- Elevation: 666 ft (203 m)
- Time zone: UTC-6 (Eastern (EST))
  - Summer (DST): UTC-5 (EST)
- GNIS feature ID: 516302

White Ash is an unincorporated community and Coal town in Lee County, Kentucky, United States.
