= Smith, Kentucky =

Unincorporated community in Kentucky, United States

- Unincorporated community
- Location within Kentucky Location within the United States
- Coordinates: 36°44′9″N 83°15′34″W
- Country: United States
- State: Kentucky
- County: Harlan
- Elevation: 1,355 ft (413 m)
- Time zone: UTC-5 (Eastern (EST))
  - Summer (DST): UTC-4 (EDT)
- GNIS feature ID: 509083

Smith is an unincorporated community in Harlan County, Kentucky, United States. The community lies along Kentucky Route 987 and the Martin's Fork of the Cumberland River. Smith is also home to Martins Fork Lake. The lake was constructed by the US Army Corps of Engineers as part of several flood control projects along the Cumberland River. The dam was complete and functional in November 1978. Until the early 1970s the community was served by Smith Elementary School. When plans were being made for construction to Martins Fork Lake, the school was closed and students were sent to nearby Cawood Elementary. The community post office was closed in the early 1990s. The community today is served by four churches: Pace Chapel, New Riverside Baptist Church, Full-Gospel Pentecostal Church and Faith-Holiness Church.
