= Vincent, Kentucky =

Unincorporated community in Kentucky, United States

Vincent
- Unincorporated community
- Location within the state of Kentucky Vincent (the United States)
- Coordinates: 37°28′06″N 83°46′26″W
- Country: United States
- State: Kentucky
- County: Owsley
- Elevation: 459 ft (140 m)
- Time zone: UTC-5 (Eastern (EST))
  - Summer (DST): UTC-4 (EDT)
- ZIP codes: 41386
- GNIS feature ID: 516184

Vincent is an unincorporated community located in Owsley County, Kentucky, United States. Its post office is still open.
