= Old Landing, Kentucky =

Unincorporated community in Kentucky, United States

- Unincorporated community
- Location in Kentucky Location in the United States
- Coordinates: 37°38′11″N 83°48′25″W
- Country: United States
- State: Kentucky
- County: Lee
- Elevation: 653 ft (199 m)
- Time zone: UTC-5 (Eastern (EST))
  - Summer (DST): UTC-4 (EDT)
- ZIP codes: 41358
- GNIS feature ID: 514328

Old Landing is an unincorporated community in Lee County, Kentucky, United States.

According to tradition, the community was named for a timber raft landing at the original town site. The post office closed in 1994.
