= Heidelberg, Kentucky =

Unincorporated community in Kentucky, United States

- Unincorporated community
- Location in Kentucky Location in the United States
- Coordinates: 37°33′19″N 83°46′44″W
- Country: United States
- State: Kentucky
- County: Lee
- Elevation: 718 ft (219 m)
- Time zone: UTC-5 (Eastern (EST))
  - Summer (DST): UTC-4 (EDT)
- ZIP codes: 41333
- GNIS feature ID: 512635

Heidelberg is an unincorporated community in Lee County, Kentucky, United States. It lies along Route 399 southwest of the city of Beattyville, the county seat of Lee County. Its elevation is 718 feet (219 m), and it is located at (37.5553639|-83.7788073). It no longer has a post office and the ZIP code is now 41311, same as Beattyville. (This Post office is Currently no longer in service and is instead being used as someone's housing.) Said post office was established in 1904, and is said to be named for the hometown of an early German-American settler.

== Climate ==
The climate in this area is characterized by hot, humid summers and generally mild to cool winters. According to the Köppen Climate Classification system, Heidelberg has a humid subtropical climate, abbreviated "Cfa" on climate maps.
