= Cannon, Kentucky =

Unincorporated community in Kentucky, United States

- Unincorporated community
- Location within Kentucky Location within the United States
- Coordinates: 36°54′52″N 83°51′30″W
- Country: United States
- State: Kentucky
- County: Knox
- Elevation: 981 ft (299 m)
- Time zone: UTC-5 (Eastern (EST))
  - Summer (DST): UTC-4 (EST)
- ZIP codes: 40923
- GNIS feature ID: 507644

Cannon is an unincorporated community in Knox County, Kentucky, United States.

The community was named for early resident Henry L. Cannon, who served as the first postmaster in 1901.
