= Rosslyn, Kentucky =

Unincorporated community in Kentucky, United States

Rosslyn
- Unincorporated community
- Location within the state of Kentucky Rosslyn (the United States)
- Coordinates: 37°50′26″N 83°48′44″W
- Country: United States
- State: Kentucky
- County: Powell
- Elevation: 669 ft (204 m)
- Time zone: UTC-6 (Central (CST))
  - Summer (DST): UTC-5 (CST)
- GNIS feature ID: 515119

Rosslyn is an unincorporated community in Powell County, Kentucky, United States.

A post office was established at Rosslyn in 1898, and remained in operation until 1917. The community most likely was named for the roses near the original town site.
