= Proctor, Kentucky =

Unincorporated community in Kentucky, United States

- Unincorporated community
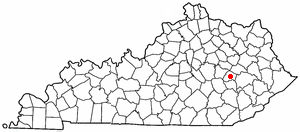
- Location in Kentucky
- Coordinates: 37°34′12″N 083°42′50″W
- Country: United States
- State: Kentucky
- County: Lee
- Elevation: 823 ft (251 m)
- Time zone: UTC-5 (Eastern (EST))
  - Summer (DST): UTC-4 (EDT)
- ZIP codes: 41311
- Area code: 606

Proctor is an unincorporated community in Lee County, Kentucky, United States. It lies along Route 11 on the other side of the river from Beattyville south of the city of Beattyville, the county seat of Lee County. Proctor is also located near the beginning point of the Kentucky River. There are three tributaries which combine near Beattyville and Proctor; the North Fork of the Kentucky River, the Middle Fork of the Kentucky River; and the South Fork of the Kentucky River. For this reason, many local businesses make mention of the "Three Forks".

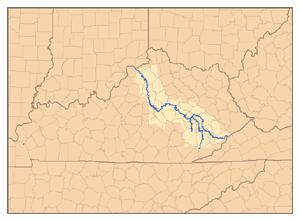
Map of the watershed of the Kentucky River, showing the North Fork, Middle Fork, and South Fork tributaries.

== History ==
After the American Revolutionary War, many veterans settled in the mountains of Kentucky, one of whom was Archibald D. McGuire. who fought in the Battle of Tippecanoe. He came to the Three Forks area from the Boonesborough, Kentucky Settlement in 1799 and settled on what is now the James H. McIntosh farm located in Proctor, the site of a large spring.

In 1848 the town of Proctor was established. It was named after Joseph Proctor, a companion of Daniel Boone, who traveled often in the area as a circuit preacher. Early Proctor enterprises included hotels, groceries, carpentry, basket making, boat building, salt gathering, coal mining, timber operations, and flour milling.

The community of Proctor was originally located within Estill County, but was assigned to the Lee County area when Lee County was formed in 1870 and was the first county seat. Its post office operated from 1843 until 1918. The first court was held on April 25, 1870, in the Old Howerton House.

Samuel and Patience Kelly Beatty sold their land along the Kentucky River to encourage the establishment of a town across the river from Proctor. In 1850 "Beattyville" was chartered.

In 1862, the Proctor flour mill was burned by troops of CSA Colonel John Hunt Morgan as he attempted to stop the retreat of General George W. Morgan (USA) from Cumberland Gap.

Lee County was established as Kentucky's 115th county on March 1, 1870, from part of Owsley, Wolfe, Breathitt and Estill counties.

Lee County may have been named for Confederate General Robert E. Lee, but many early settlers came from Lee County, Virginia and the name may have derived therefrom. James Madison Beatty, the first County Attorney, and his wife Josephine, donated land in Beattyville for a courthouse and jail, and the county seat soon moved across the river to Beattyville.

== Facts ==
Proctor is home of the first county seat of Lee County (1870) and the first Post Office within the confines of present-day Lee County (February 1846).
