= Zachariah, Kentucky =

Unincorporated community in Kentucky, United States

Zachariah
- Unincorporated community
- Location within the state of Kentucky Zachariah (the United States)
- Coordinates: 37°42′18″N 83°41′1″W
- Country: United States
- State: Kentucky
- County: Wolfe
- Elevation: 1,240 ft (380 m)
- Time zone: UTC-5 (Eastern (EST))
  - Summer (DST): UTC-4 (EST)
- ZIP codes: 41396
- GNIS feature ID: 516523

Zachariah is an unincorporated community in Wolfe County, Kentucky, United States. Its post office is closed in late 1928.
