= Congleton, Lee County, Kentucky =

Unincorporated community in Kentucky, United States

Congleton, Kentucky
- Unincorporated community
- Location in Kentucky Location in the United States
- Coordinates: 37°33′8″N 83°43′1″W
- Country: United States
- State: Kentucky
- County: Lee
- Elevation: 942 ft (287 m)
- Time zone: UTC-6 (Central (CST))
  - Summer (DST): UTC-5 (CST)
- GNIS feature ID: 511496

Congleton is an unincorporated community in Lee County, Kentucky, United States. Its post office closed in 1950.
