= Lee County, Kentucky =

County in Kentucky, United States

- County
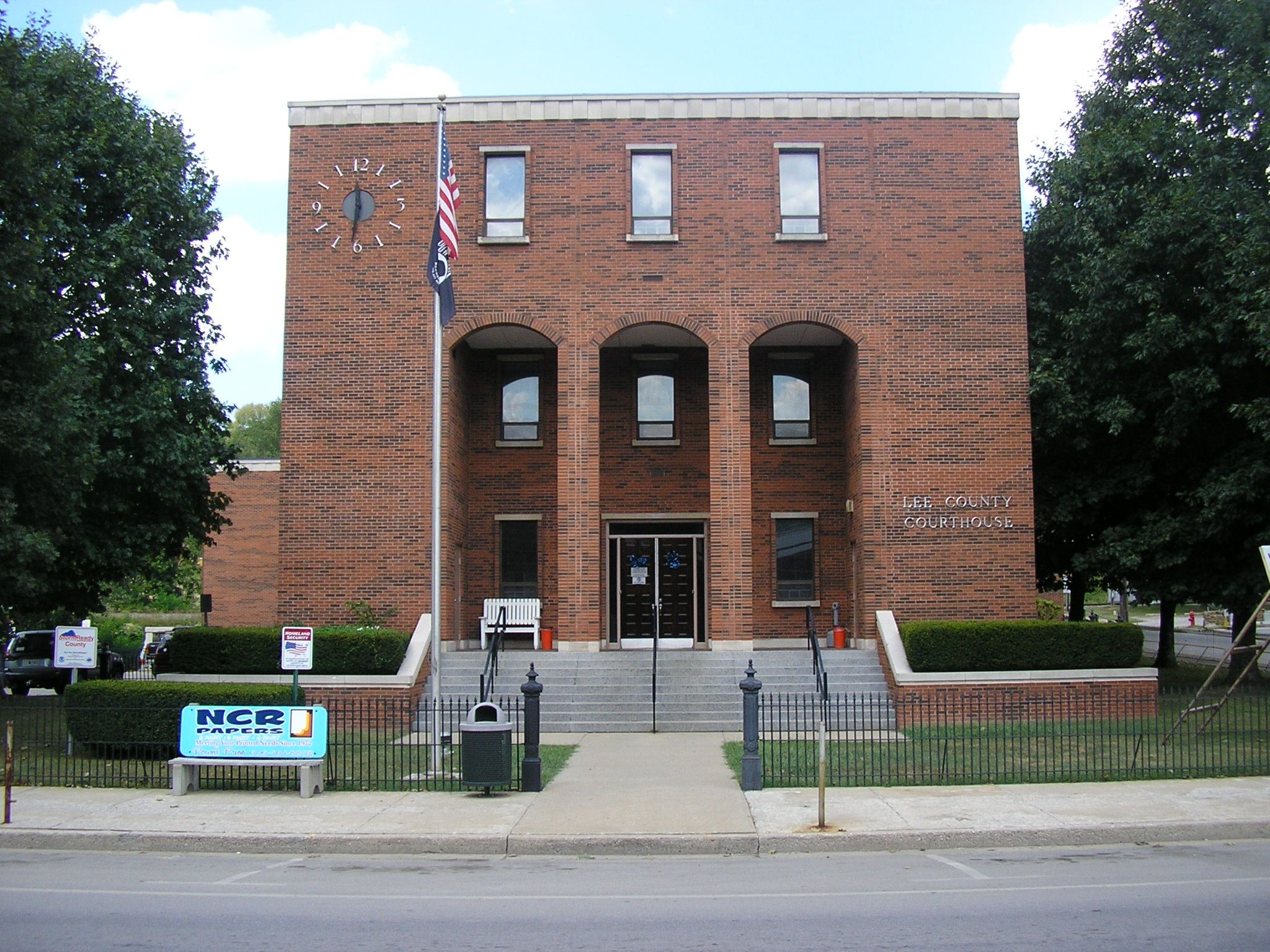
- Lee County courthouse in Beattyville

- Location within the U.S. state of Kentucky
- Coordinates: 37°35′N 83°43′W
- Country: United States
- State: Kentucky
- Founded: 1870
- Named for: Robert E. Lee
- Seat: Beattyville
- Largest city: Beattyville

Government
  - Judge/Executive: Steve Mays (R)

Area
  - Total: 211 sq mi (550 km^{2})
  - Land: 209 sq mi (540 km^{2})
  - Water: 2.4 sq mi (6.2 km^{2}) 1.1%

Population (2020)
  - Total: 7,395
  - Estimate (2025): 7,297 ▼
  - Density: 35.4/sq mi (13.7/km^{2})
- Time zone: UTC−5 (Eastern)
  - Summer (DST): UTC−4 (EDT)
- Congressional district: 5th
- Website: leecounty.ky.gov

Lee County is a county located in the U.S. state of Kentucky. As of the 2020 census, the population was 7,395. Its county seat is Beattyville. The county was formed in 1870 from parts of Breathitt, Estill, Owsley and Wolfe counties. The county was named for Robert E. Lee. The area of Kentucky where Lee County is located was a pro-union region of Kentucky but the legislature that created the county was controlled by former Confederates. The town of Proctor, named for the Rev. Joseph Proctor, was the first county seat. The first court was held on April 25, 1870, in the old Howerton House. The local economy at the time included coal mining, salt gathering, timber operations, and various commercial operations. It had a U.S. post office from 1843 until 1918.

The county seat, Beattyville, was first known as Taylor's Landing, as it was a ferry landing on the Kentucky River. It was renamed to Beatty in 1850 after early settler Samuel Beatty. The town incorporated in 1872 as Beattyville and was chosen as the new county seat due to its location on the river, which aided transportation and trade.

Although Lee County had taverns in the 19th century, it was a prohibition or dry county until 2019 when the county voted to go wet. The City of Beattyville and Lee County Fiscal Court established alcoholic sale rules for their jurisdictions including prohibiting sales of alcohol on Sunday.

== Geography ==
According to the U.S. Census Bureau, the county has a total area of 211 square miles (550 km^{2}), of which 209 square miles (540 km^{2}) is land and 2.4 square miles (6.2 km^{2}) (1.1%) is water.

=== Eastern Kentucky Coal Field ===
Lee County lies within the Eastern Coal Field region of Kentucky. The very rugged terrain essentially defines the area. Roughly half of the county lies within the Daniel Boone National Forest. Timber and coal remain economically significant, as do oil and gas. Harmful effects from unregulated strip mining and clear cut logging practices are still being corrected. The proliferation of kudzu, an invasive vine has proved difficult to address. However, the growing environmental movement and the developing tourism industry have created energy to take more action to control this pest.

=== Adjacent counties ===
- Powell County (north)
- Wolfe County (northeast)
- Breathitt County (southeast)
- Owsley County (south)
- Jackson County (southwest)
- Estill County (northwest)

=== National protected area ===
- Daniel Boone National Forest (part)

== Demographics ==
Historical population
Census	Pop.	Note	%±
1880	4,254		—
1890	6,205		45.9%
1900	7,988		28.7%
1910	9,531		19.3%
1920	11,918		25.0%
1930	9,729		−18.4%
1940	10,860		11.6%
1950	8,739		−19.5%
1960	7,420		−15.1%
1970	6,587		−11.2%
1980	7,754		17.7%
1990	7,422		−4.3%
2000	7,916		6.7%
2010	7,719		−2.5%
2020	7,395		−4.2%
2025 (est.)	7,297	▼	−1.3%
U.S. Decennial Census; 1790–1960 1900–1990; 1990–2000 2010–2021

=== 2020 census ===
As of the 2020 census, the county had a population of 7,395. The median age was 42.8 years. 18.7% of residents were under the age of 18 and 18.3% of residents were 65 years of age or older. For every 100 females there were 125.5 males, and for every 100 females age 18 and over there were 129.1 males age 18 and over.

The racial makeup of the county was 93.4% White, 3.8% Black or African American, 0.0% American Indian and Alaska Native, 0.0% Asian, 0.0% Native Hawaiian and Pacific Islander, 0.5% from some other race, and 2.3% from two or more races. Hispanic or Latino residents of any race comprised 0.8% of the population.

0.0% of residents lived in urban areas, while 100.0% lived in rural areas.

There were 2,714 households in the county, of which 27.3% had children under the age of 18 living with them and 30.2% had a female householder with no spouse or partner present. About 33.9% of all households were made up of individuals and 15.0% had someone living alone who was 65 years of age or older.

There were 3,211 housing units, of which 15.5% were vacant. Among occupied housing units, 72.4% were owner-occupied and 27.6% were renter-occupied. The homeowner vacancy rate was 1.7% and the rental vacancy rate was 4.9%.

=== 2000 census ===
As of the census of 2000, there were 7,916 people, 2,985 households, and 2,122 families residing in the county. The population density was 38 per square mile (15/km^{2}). There were 3,321 housing units at an average density of 16 per square mile (6.2/km^{2}). The racial makeup of the county was 95.10% White, 3.79% Black or African American, 0.28% Native American, 0.10% Asian, 0.01% Pacific Islander, 0.06% from other races, and 0.66% from two or more races. 0.37% of the population were Hispanic or Latino of any race.

There were 2,985 households, out of which 32.60% had children under the age of 18 living with them, 54.80% were married couples living together, 12.80% had a female householder with no husband present, and 28.90% were non-families. 26.60% of all households were made up of individuals, and 11.80% had someone living alone who was 65 years of age or older. The average household size was 2.41 and the average family size was 2.91.

In the county, the population was spread out, with 22.70% under the age of 18, 9.00% from 18 to 24, 30.30% from 25 to 44, 23.60% from 45 to 64, and 14.30% who were 65 years of age or older. The median age was 37 years. For every 100 females there were 109.40 males. For every 100 females age 18 and over, there were 111.80 males.

The median income for a household in the county was $18,544, and the median income for a family was $24,918. Males had a median income of $25,930 versus $19,038 for females. The per capita income for the county was $13,325. About 25.20% of families and 30.40% of the population were below the poverty line, including 41.00% of those under age 18 and 22.90% of those age 65 or over.

=== Life expectancy ===
Of 3,142 counties in the United States in 2013, Lee County ranked no. 3,111 for the life expectancy of males and 2,989 for longevity of females. Males in Lee County lived an average of 68.5 years and females lived an average of 76.7 years compared to the national average for life expectancy of 76.5 for males and 81.2 for females. Moreover, the average life expectancy in Lee Country was stable for males and declined by 1.5 years for females between 1985 and 2013, compared to a national average for the same period of an increased life span of 5.5 years for men and 3.1 years for women. High rates of smoking and obesity, and a low level of physical activity appear to be contributing factors to the low life expectancy for both sexes.

== Politics ==
United States presidential election results for Lee County, Kentucky
Year	Republican		Democratic		Third party(ies)	
Year	No.	%	No.	%	No.	%
1880	418	51.41%	394	48.46%	1	0.12%
1884	410	51.57%	385	48.43%	0	0.00%
1888	514	54.22%	432	45.57%	2	0.21%
1892	565	51.98%	507	46.64%	15	1.38%
1896	881	59.09%	587	39.37%	23	1.54%
1900	857	56.79%	637	42.21%	15	0.99%
1904	879	61.68%	527	36.98%	19	1.33%
1908	1,171	59.47%	783	39.77%	15	0.76%
1912	570	33.37%	728	42.62%	410	24.00%
1916	1,135	58.48%	793	40.86%	13	0.67%
1920	1,856	59.56%	1,246	39.99%	14	0.45%
1924	1,348	49.25%	1,348	49.25%	41	1.50%
1928	2,005	63.91%	1,131	36.05%	1	0.03%
1932	1,628	45.17%	1,970	54.66%	6	0.17%
1936	1,812	55.69%	1,440	44.25%	2	0.06%
1940	1,866	53.39%	1,622	46.41%	7	0.20%
1944	1,468	57.57%	1,072	42.04%	10	0.39%
1948	1,233	52.62%	1,058	45.16%	52	2.22%
1952	1,572	58.70%	1,100	41.08%	6	0.22%
1956	1,774	65.32%	938	34.54%	4	0.15%
1960	2,012	67.74%	958	32.26%	0	0.00%
1964	1,162	45.69%	1,376	54.11%	5	0.20%
1968	1,339	58.27%	674	29.33%	285	12.40%
1972	1,629	68.22%	744	31.16%	15	0.63%
1976	1,449	56.54%	1,091	42.57%	23	0.90%
1980	1,650	60.53%	1,017	37.31%	59	2.16%
1984	1,862	70.53%	768	29.09%	10	0.38%
1988	1,588	61.31%	984	37.99%	18	0.69%
1992	1,617	51.20%	1,170	37.05%	371	11.75%
1996	1,302	51.63%	1,023	40.56%	197	7.81%
2000	1,893	68.49%	836	30.25%	35	1.27%
2004	2,018	69.11%	878	30.07%	24	0.82%
2008	1,978	71.33%	752	27.12%	43	1.55%
2012	1,977	75.37%	595	22.68%	51	1.94%
2016	2,151	80.65%	444	16.65%	72	2.70%
2020	2,273	81.15%	481	17.17%	47	1.68%
2024	2,227	82.63%	406	15.06%	62	2.30%

=== Elected officials ===
Elected officials as of January 3, 2025
U.S. House	Hal Rogers (R)	KY 5
Ky. Senate	Brandon Smith (R)	30
Ky. House	Timmy Truett (R)	89

== Economy ==
Lee County, Kentucky is often listed as one of the poorest counties in the United States. In 2014, 35 percent of its population lived in poverty and the median family income was $23,968 compared to 14.8 percent poor and a $53,482 median family income for the United States as a whole.

== Communities ==
=== City ===
- Beattyville (county seat)

=== Unincorporated communities ===
- Airedale
- Athol
- Bear Track
- Belle Point
- Canyon Falls
- Congleton
- Cressmont
- Crystal
- Delvinta
- Earnestville
- Enoch
- Evelyn
- Fillmore
- Fincastle
- Fixer
- Greeley
- Heidelberg
- Idamay
- Leeco
- Lower Buffalo
- Maloney
- Monica
- Mount Olive
- Old Landing
- Primrose
- Proctor
- Saint Helens
- Standing Rock
- Tallega
- White Ash
- Williba
- Willow Shoals
- Yellow Rock
- Zacharia
- Zoe

== See also ==
- Lee County School District
- List of memorials to Robert E. Lee
- National Register of Historic Places listings in Lee County, Kentucky
