= List of Kentucky supplemental roads and rural secondary highways (400–499) =

Kentucky supplemental roads and rural secondary highways (400–499)
- Highway markers for KY 400 and KY 499

Highway names
- Interstates: Interstate nn (I-nn)
- US Highways: U.S. Highway nn (US nn)
- State: KY nn

System links
- Kentucky State Highway System; Interstate; US; State; Parkways
- Supplemental/Rural Secondary; 1–199; 200–299; 300–399; 400–499; 500–599; 600–699; 700–799; 800–899; 900–999; 1000–1499; 1500–1999; 2000–2499; 2500–2999; 3000–3499; 3500–6999

Kentucky supplemental roads and rural secondary highways are the lesser two of the four functional classes of highways constructed and maintained by the Kentucky Transportation Cabinet, the state-level agency that constructs and maintains highways in Kentucky. The agency splits its inventory of state highway mileage into four categories:

- The State Primary System includes Interstate Highways, Parkways, and other long-distance highways of statewide importance that connect the state's major cities, including much of the courses of Kentucky's U.S. Highways.
- The State Secondary System includes highways of regional importance that connect the state's smaller urban centers, including those county seats not served by the state primary system.
- The Rural Secondary System includes highways of local importance, such as farm-to-market roads and urban collectors.
- Supplemental Roads are the set of highways not in the first three systems, including frontage roads, bypassed portions of other state highways, and rural roads that only serve their immediate area.

The same-numbered highway can comprise sections of road under different categories. This list contains descriptions of Supplemental Roads and highways in the Rural Secondary System numbered 400 to 499 that do not have portions within the State Primary and State Secondary systems.

== KY 400 ==
Kentucky Route 400
- Location: Oak Grove
- Length: 1.377 mi (2.216 km)
- Existed: 1929–present

Kentucky Route 400 is a 1.377-mile-long (2.216 km) supplemental road in the city of Oak Grove in southern Christian County. The highway begins at US 41 Alt. (Fort Campbell Boulevard) at the eastern edge of Fort Campbell just north of the Tennessee state line. KY 400 heads east along State Line Road, which runs immediately north of the state line. The highway turns north away from the state line and veers east again to its terminus at KY 115 (Pembroke–Oak Grove Road). The Kentucky Transportation Cabinet established KY 400 through a March 30, 1987, official order. The route was added as a rural secondary highway; however, the highway was reclassified as a supplemental road at an unknown date, returned to the rural secondary system through an October 26, 2004, official order, and returned to the supplemental road system after a December 9, 2010, official order.

Browse numbered routes
← KY 399	→ KY 401

== KY 403 ==
Kentucky Route 403
- Location: Woodbury–Logansport
- Length: 16.031 mi (25.799 km)

Kentucky Route 403 is a 16.031-mile-long (25.799 km) route. KY 403 extends 16.759 miles (26.971 km) from US 231 near Woodbury north to the end of state maintenance near the Green River. KY 403 begins at US 231 (Bowling Green Road) south of Morgantown and southwest of Woodbury. The highway heads northeast as Woodbury Loop, which crosses over l-165 on its way to the city of Woodbury. KY 403 enters town from the west, turns north three blocks, and turns west and exits the city to the northwest. The highway crosses the Black Swamp Branch of the Green River and Renfrow Creek on its way to the city of Morgantown. Until March 1, 2021, there was a 0.874-mile-long (1.407 km) portion in Ohio County that was a supplemental road that ran from the Green River north to US 231 near Cromwell.

KY 403 enters the city on Porter Street. The route then turns north onto Main Street, which carries US 231 and KY 79. At G L Smith Street, the three concurrent routes turns west while Main Street continues as KY 2161. At the west end of downtown, the three highways have an oblique intersection with KY 2162, which heads east as Ohio Street and west as Logansport Road. At G L Smith Street's three-legged intersection with Veterans Way, KY 403 turns south onto Veterans Way to run concurrently with KY 70 for one block; KY 70 joins US 231 and KY 79 on G L Smith Street. One block to the south at the west end of KY 2162, KY 403 turns west onto Logansport Road. On its way to Logansport, the highway crosses I-165 and meets the east end of KY 269 (Reeds Ferry Road). KY 403 passes through Logansport, and the route ends at the end of state maintenance within a bend of the Green River.

Browse numbered routes
← KY 402	→ KY 404

== KY 405 ==
Kentucky Route 405
- Location: Thruston–Maceo
- Length: 6.729 mi (10.829 km)

Kentucky Route 405 is a 6.729-mile-long (10.829 km) rural secondary highway in northeastern Daviess County. The highway heads northeast from KY 144 at Thruston. KY 405 crosses Van Buren Creek and intersects KY 1831 (Wrights Landing Road). The highway crosses Pup Creek and crosses Carpenter Lake. On either side of the lake, KY 405 intersects the loop road KY 2116. North of the lake at its junction with KY 662 at Yelvington, the highway turns northwest toward Maceo, where the route intersects CSX's LH&StL Subdivision rail line and ends at KY 2830.

Browse numbered routes
← KY 404	→ KY 406

== KY 406 ==
Kentucky Route 406
- Location: Roark–Stinnett
- Length: 13.476 mi (21.688 km)

Kentucky Route 406 is a 13.476-mile-long (21.688 km) rural secondary highway in western Leslie County. The highway begins at KY 66 at the Clay County line where Upper Jacks Creek empties into the Red Bird River. KY 406 heads east along Upper Jacks Creek through Roark. East of Roark, the highway turns north out of the Upper Jacks Creek valley and then descends into the valley of Bowen Creek. KY 406 leaves that creek valley to ascend to Essie and then descends into the valley of Stinnett Creek. The highway follows Stinnett Creek east to the route's eastern terminus at US 421 next to Stinnett Creek's confluence with the Middle Fork Kentucky River at Stinnett.

Browse numbered routes
← KY 405	→ KY 407

== KY 407 ==
Kentucky Route 407
- Location: Empire–Mannington
- Length: 2.796 mi (4.500 km)

Kentucky Route 407 is a 2.796-mile-long (4.500 km) rural secondary highway in northern Christian County. The highway is a loop from US 41 (Madisonville Road) named Mannington Loop that runs from Empire north to Mannington. At Mannington, KY 407 meets the southern end of KY 1687 (Daniel Boone Road) and intersects a CSX rail line at grade just west of its terminus at US 41 just south of the Hopkins County line.

Browse numbered routes
← KY 406	→ KY 408

== KY 408 ==
Kentucky Route 408
- Location: Magee Springs–Viola; Kaler–Fairdealing
- Length: 35.619 mi (57.323 km)

Kentucky Route 408 is a 35.619-mile-long (57.323 km) highway in the Jackson Purchase that is split into two parts. The western segment is a rural secondary highway that extends 21.331 miles (34.329 km) from US 62 near Magee Springs in Carlisle County east to Hopewell Road near Viola in Graves County. The eastern segment, which contains supplemental road and rural secondary sections, extends 14.288 miles (22.994 km) from KY 534 near Kaler in Graves County east to US 68 near Fairdealing via the Marshall County seat of Benton.

The western piece of KY 408 begins at US 62 south of Magee Springs. The highway curves east at its junction with KY 1371 and intersects KY 307 north of Kirbyton. KY 408 briefly runs concurrently with KY 121, meets the southern end of KY 545, and crosses Lick Creek before entering Graves County. The highway passes through Wheel and briefly runs concurrently with KY 339 between a bridge over Goose Creek and a grade crossing of a Canadian National rail line. KY 408 intersects KY 440 west of Pottsville and KY 945 within the hamlet. The highway intersects US 45 and KY 1241 in West Viola. The western segment ofKY 408 intersects a Paducah & Louisville Railway line at Viola and crosses Mayfield Creek before reaching its eastern terminus at Hopewell Road.

The eastern segment of KY 408 has a joint terminus with KY 534 east of Kaler Bottoms Wildlife Management Area and southeast of Kaler. The highway enters Marshall County south of Oak Level near which the route meets the northern end of KY 2603 (Vanzora Road) and briefly runs concurrently with KY 1949 (Wadesboro Road). KY 408 continues east on Oak Level Road, which crosses Middle Fork Creek, a tributary of Clarks River. The highway curves north and then east during its concurrency with KY 2606 (Jackson School Road). KY 408 enters the city of Benton, in the western part of which the highway crosses Bee Creek, meets the southern end of KY 1558 (Ivey Road), and crosses over Purchase Parkway. The highway enters downtown Benton along 8th Street and joins US 641 and KY 58 in a concurrency along a one-way pair, Main Street southbound and Poplar Street northbound. At 12th Street, KY 58 heads west and KY 408 heads east out of downtown. KY 408 crosses Town Creek and meets the southern end of KY 1462 (Benton–Birmingham Road) before leaving the city. The highway crosses Johns River and Clarks River and meets the northern end of KY 1897 (Olive Hamlet Road) before reaching its eastern terminus on a tangent with US 68 west of Fairdealing.

Browse numbered routes
← KY 407	→ KY 409

== KY 409 ==
Kentucky Route 409
- Location: Stephens–Bruin
- Length: 7.499 mi (12.068 km)

Kentucky Route 409 is a 7.499-mile-long (12.068 km) rural secondary highway in northeastern Elliott County. The highway begins at KY 486 at Stephens within a bend of the Little Fork of the Little Sandy River. KY 409 heads west along Bruin Road, which follows Ison Creek upstream and crosses Johnson Creek. The highway leaves the valley of Ison Creek and curves north and descends into the valley of Bruin Creek. KY 409 follows Bruin Creek to its northern terminus at KY 7 south of Bruin.

Browse numbered routes
← KY 408	→ KY 410

== KY 410 ==
Kentucky Route 410
- Location: Greenup
- Length: 0.681 mi (1,096 m)

Kentucky Route 410 is a 0.681-mile-long (1.096 km) supplemental road in the city of Greenup in northeastern Greenup County. The highway begins at an intersection with US 23 (Seaton Avenue) at the east end of the city. KY 410 heads north along Main Street, which intersects CSX's Russell Subdivision, then curves northwest. The highway's terminus is an arbitrary point east of KY 2541's bridge across the railroad and Main Street.

=== History ===
KY 410 is a later route; the original route of KY 410 is unknown.

Browse numbered routes
← KY 409	→ KY 411

== KY 411 ==
Kentucky Route 411
- Location: Whittinghill–Shrewsbury
- Length: 16.241 mi (26.137 km)

Kentucky Route 411 is a 16.241-mile-long (26.137 km) rural secondary highway in eastern Butler County and southern Grayson County. The highway begins at KY 70 (Brownsville Road) at Whittinghill. KY 411 heads north along Love Lee Road, which crosses John Woolsey Creek and passes to the south and east of Love. The highway passes through Lee and Decker before entering Grayson County. KY 411 curves east and briefly runs concurrently with KY 185 (Bowling Green Road) at Ready, where the highway's name becomes Rabbit Flat Road. The highway passes through Windyville and parallels Sunfish Creek northeast to Shrewsbury. There, KY 411 turns southeast, crosses the creek, and reaches its eastern terminus at KY 187 (Shrewsbury Road).

=== History ===
KY 411 is a later route; the original route of KY 411 is unknown.

Browse numbered routes
← KY 410	→ KY 412

== KY 412 ==
Kentucky Route 412
- Location: Saint Mary–Calvary
- Length: 14.048 mi (22.608 km)

Kentucky Route 412 is a 14.048-mile-long (22.608 km) rural secondary highway in Marion County. The highway begins at KY 84 (Raywick Road) south of Saint Mary. KY 412 heads south along St. Joe Road, which follows Stewarts Creek to its confluence with Rolling Fork of the Salt River, just north of which the route meets the west end of KY 2741 (McElroy Pike). KY 412 crosses Rolling Fork and passes through Saint Joseph before curving southeast and crossing Knob Creek. The highway has a brief concurrency with KY 289 at Jessietown, during which the routes cross Slate Creek. KY 412 continues east on Jessietown Road, which crosses Moore Creek. East of Jessieville, the highway runs concurrently with US 68 and KY 55 (Campbellsville Highway). KY 412 splits northeast onto East Calvary Road and crosses Cloyd Creek immediately before its eastern terminus at KY 208 (Calvary Road) south of Calvary.

=== History ===
KY 412 was formed ca. 1970.

The original KY 412 ran from US 421 north of Harlan northeast to what is now KY 2010; this became part of KY 1679 by 1969.

Browse numbered routes
← KY 411	→ KY 413

== KY 413 ==
Kentucky Route 413
- Location: Loyall–Rosspoint
- Length: 5.022 mi (8.082 km)

Kentucky Route 413 is a 5.022-mile-long (8.082 km) supplemental road in central Harlan County. The highway begins at KY 840 in the city of Loyall. KY 840 heads south along Wilkerson Street and east on an unnamed road; KY 413 heads north along Wilkerson Street. As the highway approaches CSX's CV Subdivision, the route turns east onto County Pike and parallels the railroad east out of the city. KY 413 approaches and then runs between the Cumberland River to the south and the railroad to the north. At Baxter, the highway meets the southern end of KY 3460 (Sukey Hill Road) and has a grade crossing of the CV Subdivision at the railroad's junction with its Poor Fork Branch, which the route continues along. KY 413 meets the western end of KY 72 just north of the confluence of the Poor Fork with the Cumberland River. The highway passes under US 119 just west of its southern junction with US 421 and parallels the Poor Fork and the eponymous rail line northeast. KY 413 intersects US 421 (Pine Mountain Road) just west of the U.S. Highway's northern junction with US 119, which runs along the opposite side of Poor Fork. The highway crosses the Tom Jones Branch of Poor Fork at Gatun and has a grade crossing with the railroad before reaching its eastern terminus at an oblique intersection with KY 522 east of Rosspoint.

Browse numbered routes
← KY 412	→ KY 414

== KY 414 ==
Kentucky Route 414
- Location: Henderson
- Existed: 2014

Kentucky Route 414 ran on Stratman Road from Sunset Lane east to US 41 north of Henderson, and after a short concurrency with US 41, it continued east via Wolf Hills Road and south via Green River Road to end at Wathen Lane. The section east of US 41 was decommissioned on May 6, 1997, and was given to Henderson County, and the remaining section was decommissioned on August 20, 2014.

Browse numbered routes
← KY 413	→ KY 415

== KY 415 ==
Kentucky Route 415
- Location: Rolan–Hebbardsville
- Length: 6.674 mi (10.741 km)

Kentucky Route 415 is a 6.674-mile-long (10.741 km) rural secondary highway in southeastern Clinton County. The highway begins at Koger Mountain Road and Koger Lane east of Rolan. KY 415 follows Koger Creek to its confluence with McIver Creek, where the highway veers northwest. The highway crosses Duvall Creek just west of its junction with KY 968. West of the creek, KY 415 runs concurrently with KY 696. The highway continues northwest and crosses Smith Creek at Cannons Mill before reaching its northern terminus at KY 350.

=== History ===
KY 415 was formed in 1951; the original route of KY 415 is unknown.

Browse numbered routes
← KY 414	→ KY 416

== KY 416 ==
Kentucky Route 416
- Location: Tunnel Hill–Hebbardsville
- Length: 24.477 mi (39.392 km)

Kentucky Route 416 is a 24.477-mile-long (39.392 km) rural secondary highway in southern Henderson County. The highway extends from US 41 Alt. at Tunnel Hill east to a dead end at the Green River east of Hebbardsville. KY 416 heads east from US 41 Alt. and meets the southern ends of KY 1217 (Pruitt–Agnew Road) and KY 1299. The highway crosses Canoe Creek and enters the city of Robards at its intersection with KY 283. KY 416 intersects a CSX's Henderson Subdivision rail line in the center of Robards, and the route crosses Grane Creek and intersects US 41 on the east side of the city. East of Robards, the highway has a diamond interchange with I-69 (Pennyrile Parkway) and, just east of the interchange, meets the north end of KY 2096 (Alcan–Aluminum Road).

KY 416 continues northeast through Niagara, where it briefly runs concurrently with KY 136, and through Coraville, where the route crosses Cash Creek and meets the east end of KY 520 (Upper Delaware Road). East of Coraville, the highway crosses Lick Creek and briefly runs concurrently with KY 1078. KY 416 has a four-loop-ramp interchange with the Audubon Parkway south of Hebbardsville. North of the parkway in the village center, the highway turns east at its junction with KY 351 (Zion Road). KY 416 briefly parallels the parkway before reaching its terminus at a dead end on the left bank of the Green River north of the parkway's bridge across the river.

Browse numbered routes
← KY 415	→ KY 417

== KY 417 ==
Kentucky Route 417
- Location: Greensburg
- Length: 6.160 mi (9.914 km)

Kentucky Route 417 is a 6.160-mile-long (9.914 km) rural secondary highway in central Green County. The highway begins at Main Street—which carries US 68, KY 61, and KY 70—at the south end of downtown Greensburg. KY 417 heads southeast along Columbia Avenue, which passes through an S-curve and becomes Legion Park Road, which passes to the south of Green County High School. The highway leaves the city of Greensburg and passes Green County American Legion Park before it crosses the Green River. East of the river, KY 417 turns south onto Blowing Springs Road, which the route follows to its eastern terminus at Grissom Road, from which Blowing Springs Road continues as a county highway.

=== History ===
KY 417 was formerly part of KY 487.

The original KY 417 ran from KY 84 west of Lebanon northwest to C. Campbell Road; this was decommissioned by 1955, and is now obliterated.

Another KY 417 ran from KY 227 near Hessler northeast to KY 1883; this was removed by 1977, and is now KY 3103.

Browse numbered routes
← KY 416	→ KY 418

== KY 419 ==
Kentucky Route 419
- Location: Mays Lick–Lewisburg (in Mason County)
- Length: 5.092 mi (8.195 km)

Kentucky Route 419 is a 5.092-mile-long (8.195 km) rural secondary highway in southern Mason County. The highway begins at KY 324 east of Mays Lick. The highway heads north along Wards Pike, which crosses the North Fork of the Licking River west of Lewisburg. KY 419 turns north at its junction with KY 3170, which heads south into Lewisburg, and reaches its northern terminus at KY 11.

Browse numbered routes
← KY 418	→ KY 420

== KY 422 ==
Kentucky Route 422
- Location: Pig
- Length: 2.909 mi (4.682 km)

Kentucky Route 422 is a 2.909-mile-long (4.682 km) rural secondary highway in southeastern Edmonson County. The highway begins at US 31W (Louisville Road). KY 422 heads north along Pig Road, which crosses Beaverdam Creek, a tributary of the Green River, and meets the eastern end of KY 743 (New Grove Road). The highway reaches its northern terminus at KY 259 (Brownsville Road) at Pig.

=== History ===
KY 422 was formed ca. 1958, however, the original route of KY 422 is unknown.

Browse numbered routes
← KY 421	→ KY 423

== KY 423 ==
Kentucky Route 423
- Location: Millport.
- Length: 0.918 mi (1,477 m)

Kentucky Route 423 is a 0.918-mile-long (1.477 km) rural secondary highway in northwestern Muhlenberg County. The highway begins at a wye junction with KY 175. KY 423 heads north and intersects a CSX rail line before reaching its north terminus at Stringtown Road at Millport. The road continues as county-maintained Millport-Sacramento Road.

Browse numbered routes
← KY 422	→ KY 423

== KY 424 ==
Kentucky Route 424
- Location: Allendale–Mac
- Length: 3.082 mi (4.960 km)

Kentucky Route 424 is a 6.160-mile-long (9.914 km) rural secondary highway in northern Green County and western Taylor County. The highway begins at KY 61 (Hodgenville Road) west of Allendale. KY 424 heads northeast and passes east of the hamlet of Bloyd before entering Taylor County. The highway crosses Little Brush Creek before reaching its eastern terminus at KY 569 at Mac.

=== History ===
KY 424 was formed ca. 1955.

The original KY 424 ran from US 25 to Levi Jackson Wilderness Road Park; this is now part of KY 1006.

Browse numbered routes
← KY 423	→ KY 425

== KY 427 ==
Kentucky Route 427
- Location: Westplains
- Length: 1.018 mi (1.638 km)

Kentucky Route 427 is a 1.018-mile-long (1.638 km) supplemental road in eastern Graves County. The highway extends from KY 1374 north to KY 483 east of Westplains.

=== History ===
It is unclear when this route was formed, but it was formed after 1954, though the original route of KY 427 is unknown.

Browse numbered routes
← KY 426	→ KY 428

== KY 428 ==
Kentucky Route 428
- Location: Guston–Haysville
- Length: 5.402 mi (8.694 km)

Kentucky Route 428 is a 5.402-mile-long (8.694 km) rural secondary highway in western Meade County. The highway begins at US 60 (Owensboro Highway) south of Guston. KY 428 heads northwest along Guston Road, which meets the southern end of KY 710 (Old State Road) and intersects a CSX rail line in the hamlet of Guston. The highway meets the west end of KY 2727 (Haysville Road) in Haysville. KY 428 intersects KY 79 before reaching its northern terminus at KY 261 (Sandy Hill Road).

== KY 429 ==
Kentucky Route 429
- Location: Lebanon–Cisselville
- Length: 9.055 mi (14.573 km)

Kentucky Route 429 is a 9.055-mile-long (14.573 km) rural secondary highway in northern Marion County and southwestern Washington County. The highway begins at KY 55(Spalding Avenue) in the city of Lebanon. KY 429 heads northwest out of the city along Saint Rose Road, which intersects the city bypass, KY 2154 (Veterans Memorial Highway). The highway follows Shepherds Run into Washington County. KY 429 diverges from the stream at its confluence with Cartwright Creek and reaches its northern terminus at KY 152 (Loretto Road) at Cisselville.

== KY 430 ==
Kentucky Route 430
- Location: Russell Springs
- Length: 1.690 mi (2.720 km)

Kentucky Route 430 is a 1.690-mile-long (2.720 km) rural secondary highway within the city of Russell Springs in central Russell County. The highway begins at US 127 (Russellville Road) on the south side of the city. KY 430 heads northwest along Lake Way Drive, which crosses over the Cumberland Parkway. As the highway approaches downtown Russell Springs, KY 430 veers onto Jamestown Street at its tangent intersection with KY 3017, which follows the rest of Lake Way Drive. The highway intersects KY 379 (Main Street) before reaching its northern terminus at a tangent intersection with KY 80 (Steve Wariner Drive).

=== History ===
KY 430 was formerly part of US 127.

A previous KY 430 ran from KY 271 to US 60 in Hawesville; this was decommissioned, and is now KY 1847, though the original route of KY 430 is unknown.

Browse numbered routes
← KY 429	→ KY 431

== KY 432 ==
Kentucky Route 432
- Location: Bowling Green–Blue Level
- Length: 2.809 mi (4.521 km)

Kentucky Route 432 is a 2.809-mile-long (4.521 km) rural secondary highway in western Warren County. The highway begins at US 68 and KY 80 (Russellville Road) on the western edge of Bowling Green. KY 432 heads northwest along Blue Level Road to its terminus at the road's intersection with White Stone Quarry Road at the hamlet of Blue Level, from which Blue Level Road continues west as a county highway.

=== History ===
KY 432 was formed by 1955.

The original KY 432 ran from KY 55 in Crocus southeast to KY 35 (now US 127) in Sewellton; this became part of rerouted KY 55 when the old route of KY 55 was given to the counties as the ferry along it was discontinued; it is now Crocus Road, KY 1058, Logan Antle Road, and KY 3063.

== KY 433 ==
Kentucky Route 433
- Location: Mackville–Polin
- Length: 14.832 mi (23.870 km)

Western Terminus of KY 433

Kentucky Route 433 is a 14.832-mile-long (23.870 km) rural secondary highway in northern Washington County. The highway begins at KY 152 (Mackville Road) in Mackville. KY 433 heads northwest along Mackville–Willisbyurg Road, which meets the south end of KY 1586 (Battle Road) and follows Taylors Fork. The highway ascends to a ridge and enters Willisburg, where the route runs concurrently with KY 53 on Main Street. West of the city, KY 433 splits northwest onto Polin Road and intersects KY 555 (Triple 5 Highway). The highway crosses Lick Creek at Polin before reaching its northern terminus at KY 458 (Mount Zion Road).

Browse numbered routes
← KY 432	→ KY 434

== KY 435 ==
Kentucky Route 435
- Location: Fernleaf–Augusta
- Length: 11.193 mi (18.013 km)

Kentucky Route 435 is a 11.193-mile-long (18.013 km) rural secondary highway in western Mason County and eastern Bracken County. The highway begins at KY 10 at Fernleaf. KY 435 heads north along Ida M. Ross Road, which intersects KY 9 (AA Highway) and curves west at its junction with KY 1235 (Dover Minerva Road) at Minerva. The highway continues into Bracken County along Augusta Minerva Road. KY 435 crosses Bracken Creek and follows the creek to the city of Augusta on the Ohio River. The highway meets the northern end of KY 2370 (Dutch Ridge Road) and crosses Little Bracken Creek before reaching its northern terminus at KY 8 (Mary Ingles Highway).

Browse numbered routes
← KY 434	→ KY 436

== KY 437 ==
Kentucky Route 437
- Location: Elamton–Relief
- Length: 12.366 mi (19.901 km)

Kentucky Route 437 is a 12.366-mile-long (19.901 km) rural secondary highway in eastern Morgan County. The highway begins at KY 172 northwest of Elamton. KY 437 crosses Elk Fork, a tributary of the Licking River, and follows Williams Creek southeast through Elamton to Dingus, where the route meets the west end of KY 1260 (Coffee Creek Road). The highway follows Williams Creek to its source then descends to Mima, where the route meets the east end of KY 589 in the valley of Smith Creek. KY 437 follows Smith Creek northeast to the stream's confluence with the Open Fork of Paint Creek, which the route crosses immediately before its eastern terminus at KY 172 west of Relief.

== KY 438 ==
Kentucky Route 438
- Location: Valley Hill–Mackville
- Length: 12.824 mi (20.638 km)
- Existed: 1987–present

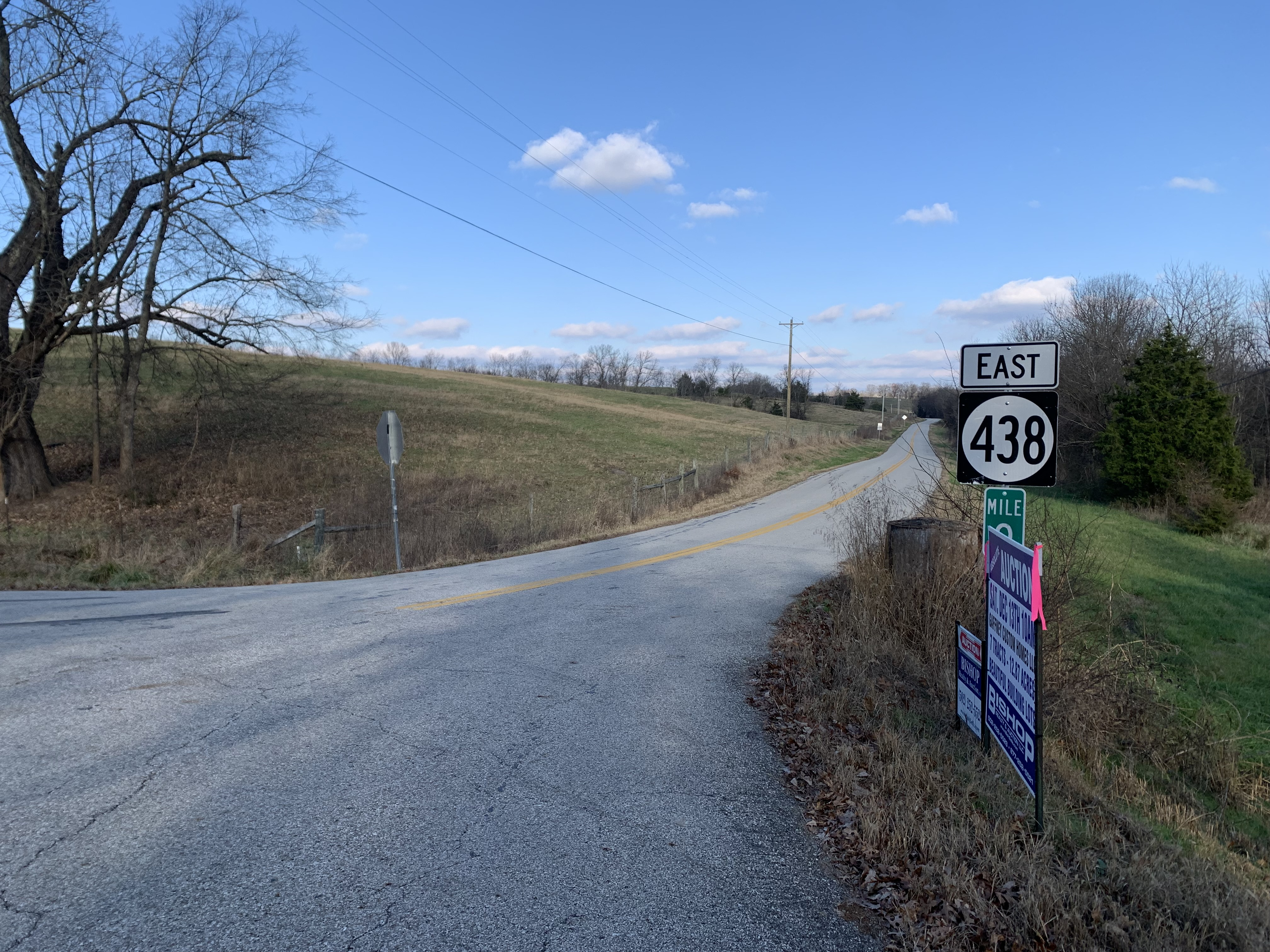
Western terminus of KY 438 in Washington County

Kentucky Route 438 is a 12.824-mile-long (20.638 km) rural secondary highway in northern Washington County. The highway begins at KY 55 (Bloomfield Road) east of Valley Hill. KY 438 heads east along Beechland Road, which crosses Lincoln Run just west of its junction with KY 528 (Lincoln Park Road) within Lincoln Homestead State Park. The highway crosses the Beech Fork of the Salt River at Litsey and runs concurrently with KY 555 (Triple 5 Highway) north of Pleasant Grove. KY 438 diverges from KY 555 onto Mayes Creek Road at Mays Creek, which the highway follows southeast. The highway crosses a ridge and follows Long Lick Creek to its terminus at KY 152 (Mackville Road) at the west end of Mackville. The Kentucky Transportation Cabinet assigned KY 438 through a March 11, 1987, official order.

== KY 439 ==
Kentucky Route 439
- Location: Columbia
- Length: 1.674 mi (2.694 km)

Kentucky Route 439 is a 1.674-mile-long (2.694 km) rural secondary highway in central Adair County. The highway begins on the west side of Columbia at a four-legged intersection with the Columbia Bypass, which carries KY 55 north and both KY 55 and KY 61 south. The west leg of the intersection is KY 61. East of its western terminus, KY 439 has an intersection with Kentucky Route 439 Connector, a 0.137-mile-long (0.220 km) rural secondary highway between KY 439 and KY 2287 (Greensburg Road), which passes under the bypass and terminates at KY 61 to the west. KY 439 enters the city of Columbia along Greensburg Street, which turns south at its junction with KY 767 (Pelham Branch Road). KY 439 enters the Columbia Commercial Historic District and passes the Dr. Nathan Gaither House before ending as the north leg of a four-legged roundabout that encircles the Adair County Courthouse. The west, south, and east legs of the roundabout are, respectively, KY 80 (Burkesville Street), KY 55 Bus. and KY 80 (Jamestown Street), and KY 55 Bus. (Campbellsville Street). The Kentucky Transportation Cabinet reassigned the portion of KY 439 west of the Columbia Bypass as part of KY 61 and established KY 439 Conn. through a May 14, 2009, official order.

== KY 440 ==
Kentucky Route 440
- Location: Mayfield–Lowes
- Length: 7.421 mi (11.943 km)

Kentucky Route 440 is a 7.421-mile-long (11.943 km) rural secondary highway in northwestern Graves County. The highway begins at a tanget nt intersection with KY 121 northwest of Mayfield. KY 440 heads northwest and intersects KY 945 and the east end of KY 1213 around its crossing of Gilbert Creek, a tributary of Mayfield Creek. The highway intersects KY 408 west of Pottsville and crosses Wilson Creek as it approaches the village of Lowes. KY 440 meets the east end of KY 2588 (School Street) shortly before reaching its northern terminus at KY 339.

Browse numbered routes
← KY 439	→ KY 441

== KY 442 ==
Kentucky Route 442
- Location: Pottsville–Jenkinsville
- Length: 6.661 mi (10.720 km)

Kentucky Route 442 is a 6.661-mile-long (10.720 km) rural secondary highway in southeastern Washington County. The highway begins at US 150 (Perryville Road) between Pottsville and the Boyle County line. KY 442 heads north on Deep Creek Road, which eventually follows the eponymous creek to a very close encounter with the Mercer County county line and the west end of KY 1920 (Perryville–Mackville Road). The highway leaves Deep Creek and crosses a ridge to Glens Creek, which the route follows to its northern terminus at KY 152 (Mackville–Harrodsburg Road) at Jenkinsville. After US 150 was placed on its present course through Pottsville, the Kentucky Transportation Cabinet extended KY 442 south along a piece of old US 150 (Pottsville Road) to new US 150 through a November 29, 2005, official order.

=== History ===
KY 442 was formed by 1954.

The original KY 442 ran from US 23/42 in Erlanger to the Boone County Airport; this was renumbered to KY 236.

== KY 443 ==
Kentucky Route 443
- Location: Rock Springs
- Length: 2.505 mi (4.031 km)

Kentucky Route 443 is a 2.505-mile-long (4.031 km) supplemental road in western Henderson County. The highway begins at locally maintained Cairo–Hickory Grove Road. KY 443 heads northwest along Rudy Road and crosses a pair of tributaries of Canoe Creek, which flows into Wilson Creek and thence the Ohio River, on its way to US 41 Alt. north of Rock Springs.

=== History ===
KY 443 was formed after 1954, but the original route of KY 443 is unknown.

== KY 444 ==
Kentucky Route 444
- Location: New Concord–Hamlin
- Length: 6.437 mi (10.359 km)

Kentucky Route 444 is a 6.437-mile-long (10.359 km) rural secondary highway in southeastern Calloway County. The highway begins at KY 121 at New Concord. KY 444 heads northeast along Dunbar Road, which crosses Beechy Creek and Tan Branch, both tributaries of the Blood River of Kentucky Lake. At the lakefront community of Hamlin on the main body of Kentucky Lake, the highway meets the southern end of KY 1918 and reaches its eastern terminus at Dunbar Road's intersection with Tearose Drive and Primrose Drive.

Browse numbered routes
← KY 443	→ KY 445

== KY 447 ==
Kentucky Route 447
- Location: Elizabethtown–Radcliff
- Length: 2.116 mi (3.405 km)

Kentucky Route 447 is a 2.116-mile-long (3.405 km) rural secondary highway in central Hardin County. The highway begins at US 31W (Dixie Avenue) at the north end of the city of Elizabethtown. KY 447, which follows Wilson Road, heads west and curves north at a tangent intersection with Cabinet Lane at the route's bridge across Shaw Creek, a tributary of the Nolin River. The highway runs concurrently with KY 2802 between that route's Hutcherson Lane and W.A. Jenkins Road sections and passes through the south end of the city of Radcliff. KY 447 reaches its northern terminus at KY 220 (Rineyville–Big Springs Road); Wilson Road continues north as a local highway.

Browse numbered routes
← KY 446	→ KY 448

== KY 449 ==
Kentucky Route 449
- Location: Kettle–Bow
- Length: 8.994 mi (14.474 km)

Kentucky Route 449 is a 8.994-mile-long (14.474 km) rural secondary highway in eastern Cumberland County. The highway begins at KY 61 (Celina Road) north of Kettle. KY 449 heads roughly eastward in a curvaceous path along Modoc Road. The highway curves north at KY 1206 (State Park Road) and northwest at KY 1351 (Green Grove Road) at Modoc. KY 449 crosses Bear Creek, a tributary of the Cumberland River, immediately before its terminus at KY 90 (Albany Road) east of Bow.

Browse numbered routes
← KY 448	→ KY 450

== KY 450 ==
Kentucky Route 450
- Location: Symsonia–Woodlawn-Oakdale
- Length: 8.633 mi (13.893 km)

Kentucky Route 450 is a 8.633-mile-long (13.893 km) rural secondary highway in northern Graves County and eastern McCracken County. The highway begins at KY 348 northwest of Symsonia and follows Oaks Road into McCracken County. KY 450 meets the east end of KY 1255 (Bonds Road) before crossing a tributary of the West Fork of Clarks River and passes through Oaks. The highway intersects KY 3075 at Sheehan Bridge and passes under I-24. KY 450 continues to the unincorporatedPaducah suburbs of Woodlawn and Oakdale, where the route intersects KY 1954 (John Puryear Drive), which forms part of I-24 Bus. The highway continues on the west side of KY 1954 to its terminus at KY 284 (Benton Road); KY 450 serves as a connector between KY 284 and KY 1954, which crosses over the former route immediately to the east of KY 450's terminus.

Browse numbered routes
← KY 449	→ KY 451

== KY 452 ==
Kentucky Route 452
- Location: Pulaski–Bobtown
- Length: 6.048 mi (9.733 km)

Kentucky Route 452 is a 6.048-mile-long (9.733 km) rural secondary highway in northern Pulaski County. The highway begins at KY 1247 at Pulaski. KY 452 heads east and intersects US 27. The highway crosses Pittman Creek, a tributary of the Cumberland River, and passes through the hamlet of Etna. KY 452 meets the northern end of KY 3266 and crosses Indian Creek before reaching its eastern terminus at KY 39 at Bobtown.

Browse numbered routes
← KY 451	→ KY 453

== KY 454 ==
Kentucky Route 454
- Location: St. Charles–Carbondale
- Length: 2.284 mi (3.676 km)

Kentucky Route 454 is a 2.284-mile-long (3.676 km) rural secondary highway in southern Hopkins County. The highway begins at US 62 in the city of St. Charles. KY 454 heads north and crosses I-69 with no access. The highway crosses a branch of Caney Creek before reaching its northern terminus at KY 112 at Carbondale.

Browse numbered routes
← KY 453	→ KY 455

== KY 456 ==
Kentucky Route 456
- Location: Curdsville–Sorgho
- Length: 3.392 mi (5.459 km)

Kentucky Route 456 is a 3.392-mile-long (5.459 km) rural secondary highway in western Daviess County. The highway begins at KY 500 south of Curdsville. KY 456 heads east and crosses Panther Creek, a tributary of the Green River. before reaching its eastern terminus at KY 56 west of Sorgho.

Browse numbered routes
← KY 455	→ KY 457

== KY 457 ==
Kentucky Route 457
- Location: Mooresville–Holy Cross
- Length: 10.904 mi (17.548 km)

Kentucky Route 457 is a 10.904-mile-long (17.548 km) rural secondary highway in southeastern Nelson County and northwestern Marion County. The highway begins at KY 84 (Stiles Road) at the Nelson–Marion county line near Gleanings. KY 457 heads north along Gap Knob Road, which follows and then crosses Sulphur Lick Creek. The highway descends to New Hope, where the route runs concurrently with KY 52 (New Hope Road) across Pottinger Creek, a tributary of Roling Fork. KY 457 diverges from KY 52 onto Holy Cross Road, which heads north then turns east into Marion County, where the route terminates as the west leg of a four-legged intersection at Holy Cross. KY 49 heads north and east along Holy Cross Road, and KY 527 heads south along St. Francis Road.

== KY 458 ==
Kentucky Route 458
- Location: Mooresville–Wakefield
- Length: 15.229 mi (24.509 km)

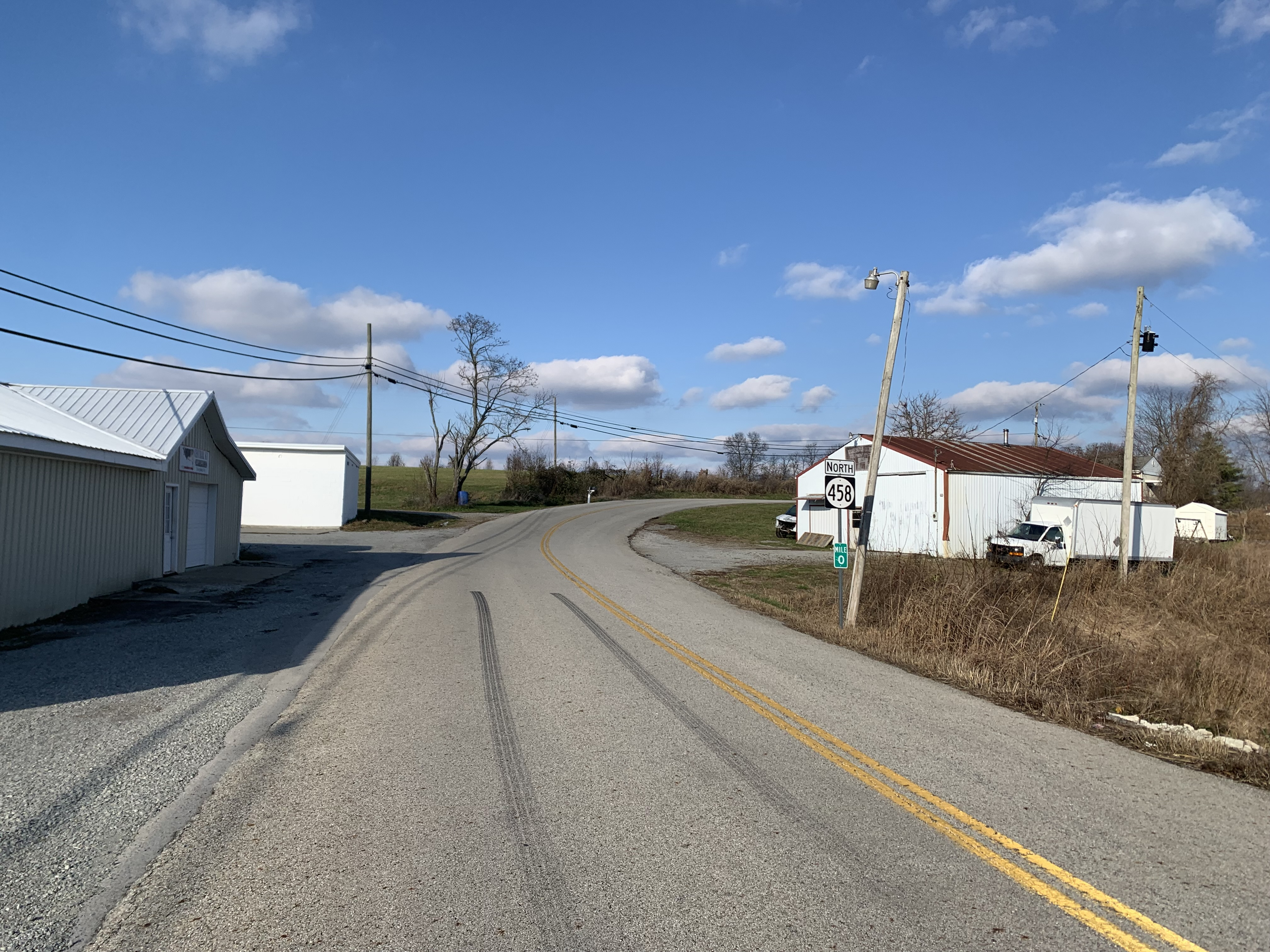
Western terminus of KY 458 at Moorseville

Kentucky Route 458 is a 15.229-mile-long (24.509 km) rural secondary highway in northwestern Washington County, eastern Nelson County, and far southern Spencer County. The highway extends between a pair of intersections with KY 55 at Mooresville and Wakefield. KY 458 heads north from KY 55 (Bloomfield Road) along Mount Zion Road, which crosses the Beech Fork of the Chaplin River. The highway meets the west ends of KY 433 (Polin Road) and KY 1796 (Brush Grove Road) before crossing the Chaplin River into Nelson County, where the route continues as Old Tunnel Hill Road. KY 458 crosses over the Bluegrass Parkway and enters the village of Chaplin. There, the highway meets the west end of KY 1754 (Old Willisburg Road) and turns west to run concurrently with US 62 (Chaplin Road). During the overlap, the highways intersect the south end of KY 1873 (Ashes Creek Road) and the north end of KY 2738 (Tunnel Mill Road). KY 458 splits north from US 62 onto Chaplin–Taylorsville Road, which parallels Jacks Creek north. The highway intersects KY 1066 before crossing into Spencer County, where the route immediately ends at KY 55 south of Wakefield.

=== History ===
KY 458 was originally Kentucky Route 431 until US 431 extended into the state in 1953.

The original KY 458 ran from KY 345 near Herndon to the Tennessee State Line via Bell Station Road; this was decommissioned, but later reinstated as KY 1483 until its decommissioning on November 20, 1980.

== KY 459 ==
Kentucky Route 459
- Location: Dishman Springs–Barbourville
- Length: 11.710 mi (18.845 km)

Kentucky Route 459 is a 11.710-mile-long (18.845 km) rural secondary highway in western Knox County. The highway begins at KY 6 near Dishman Springs. KY 459 heads south parallel to Big Indian Creek, which the highway crosses twice. Near Big Indian Creek's mouth at the Cumberland River, the route curves east and then north as it follows the river upstream. Within the curve, KY 459 crosses Bull Run Creek, passes through the hamlet of Swan Lake, and passes Dr. Thomas Walker State Historic Site. At Providence, the highway curves east and meets the west end of KY 2423 (Sharps Gap Road). KY 459 enters the city of Barbourville on Pitzer Street and crosses Richland Creek. The highway has a jog on Sycamore Street before following Daniel Boone Drive one block to its eastern terminus at KY 6 and KY 11 at the south end of the Barbourville Commercial District. KY 6 heads north on Main Street through the courthouse square, and KY 11 heads south on Main Street and east on Daniel Boone Drive. The Kentucky Transportation Cabinet transferred KY 459 from the state secondary system to the rural secondary system through a November 3, 2004, official order.

Browse numbered routes
← KY 458	→ KY 460

== KY 462 ==
Kentucky Route 462
- Location: Badger–Gleanings
- Length: 11.783 mi (18.963 km)

Kentucky Route 462 is a 11.783-mile-long (18.963 km) rural secondary highway mostly in far eastern LaRue County but with short segments on either side in Taylor and Nelson counties. The highway begins at KY 210 (Campbellsville Road) at Badger in northwestern Taylor County. KY 462 follows Attilla Road along the top of a ridge that forms the Taylor–LaRue county line. The highway meets the western end of KY 1511 (Social Band Road) on top of the ridge. KY 462 descends from the ridge fully into LaRue County and passes through the hamlet of Attilla. The highway continues as Gleanings Road, which briefly parallels Christie Creek and passes through the hamlet of Gleanings. KY 462 crosses Rolling Fork into far southern Nelson County and reaches its northern terminus at KY 84 (Stiles Road). The Kentucky Transportation Cabinet extended KY 462 to its present southern terminus on part of a bypassed loop of KY 210 through a March 12, 2002, official order after KY 210 was relocated at Badger.

Browse numbered routes
← KY 461	→ KY 463

== KY 464 ==
Kentucky Route 464
- Location: Mayfield–Shiloh
- Length: 27.658 mi (44.511 km)

Kentucky Route 464 is a 27.658-mile-long (44.511 km) rural secondary highway in Graves County and Calloway County. The highway extends from KY 121 Bus. in Mayfield east to KY 94 near Shiloh. KY 464 begins at KY 121 Bus. (6th Street) south of downtown Mayfield. The highway heads east along Backusburg Road to the east city limit, where the route intersects KY 121 (Castleman Bypass). KY 464 crosses Mayfield Creek and meets the northern ends of KY 940 and KY 2205 before crossing Vulton Creek. The highway intersects KY 564 south of Golo before entering Calloway County. KY 464 has staggered intersections with KY 1836, which heads south as Hammond Road and north as Downing Road, on either side of the West Fork of Clarks River at Backusburg. KY 464 intersects KY 299 (Kirksey Road) at Kirksey, where the route's name becomes Kirksey Almo Road. The highway intersects KY 783 (Airport Road) and crosses Rockhouse Creek. KY 464 intersects US 641 west of Almo Heights and KY 1824 in the hamlet itself. The highway continues through the village of Almo, east of which the highway crosses Clarks River. KY 464 continues along Almo Shiloh Road, which crosses Jonathan Creek before passing through Shiloh, where the highway meets the west end of KY 1551. The highway intersects KY 80 before reaching its eastern terminus at KY 94.

Browse numbered routes
← KY 463	→ KY 465

== KY 465 ==
Kentucky Route 465
- Location: Sparta
- Length: 7.199 mi (11.586 km)

Kentucky Route 465 is a 7.199-mile-long (11.586 km) rural secondary highway in southern Gallatin County. The highway extends from KY 47 west of Sparta to KY 455 north of Sparta. KY 465 begins at KY 47 just east of the Carroll County line at the confluence of Stony Creek with Lick Creek, which flows into Eagle Creek. The route heads east along Boone Road, which runs northeast between Lick Creek to the south and I-71 to the north. KY 465 passes under and then meets the south end of KY 1039 south of that highway's interchange with I-71. The highway veers away from Lick Creek and passes through the northern fringe of the city of Sparta, where the route intersects KY 35 (Sparta Pike). KY 465 curves north and crosses over I-71 before reaching its eastern terminus at KY 455 (Johnson Hill Road).

== KY 466 ==
Kentucky Route 466
- Location: Weeksbury–Melvin
- Length: 4.062 mi (6.537 km)

Kentucky Route 466 is a 4.062-mile-long (6.537 km) rural secondary highway in southern Floyd County. The highway begins at the junction of Abe Fork Road and Skull Fork Road southeast of Wheelwright and southwest of Weeksbury. KY 466 follows the upper reaches of the Left Fork of Beaver Creek, a tributary of Levisa Fork, crosses the creek three times, and passes through Weeksbury on its way to its northern terminus at KY 122 at Melvin.

Browse numbered routes
← KY 465	→ KY 467

== KY 469 ==
Kentucky Route 469
- Location: Redbush–Martha
- Length: 8.239 mi (13.259 km)

Kentucky Route 469 is a 8.239-mile-long (13.259 km) rural secondary highway in northwestern Johnson County and southwestern Lawrence County. The highway begins at KY 172 at Redbush. KY 469 follows Upper Laurel Creek north then turns west to cross to the valley of Keaton Fork, where the route meets the northern end of KY 1614 and turns north again. The highway follows Keaton Fork through the hamlet of Keaton and meets the west end of KY 1092 before entering Lawrence County at the confluence of Keaton Creek with Left Fork Blaine Creek, which the route crosses just south of its junction with KY 1715 near Skaggs. KY 469 follows Left Fork Blaine Creek east to its terminus at KY 32 just north of its crossing of Right Fork Blaine Creek at Martha. The Kentucky Transportation Cabinet transferred KY 469 from the state secondary system to the rural secondary system through a pair of October 19, 2004, official orders.

Browse numbered routes
← KY 468	→ KY 470

== KY 470 ==
Kentucky Route 470
- Location: Magnolia–Hodgenville
- Length: 15.149 mi (24.380 km)
- Existed: 1987–present

Kentucky Route 470 is a 15.149-mile-long (24.380 km) rural secondary highway in eastern LaRue County. The highway extends from US31E at Magnolia north to KY 1832 near Hodgenville. KY 470 begins at a tangent intersection with US 31E (New Jackson Highway) in the village of Magnolia at the south end of LaRue County. The highway heads northeast along L and N Turnpike and meets the north end of KY 1549 and the west end of KY 1906 (Mount Sherman Road) before leaving the Magnolia area. KY 470 crosses Bayne Creek and Walters Creek, both tributaries of the South Fork of the Nolin River, and meets the west end of KY 1192 (Bailey Road). The highway runs concurrently with KY 61 (Greensburg Road) between South Buffalo and Buffalo, along which the highways cross Brownfield Creek.

KY 470 continues northeast from Buffalo and crosses the South Fork of the Nolin River and intersects KY 210 (Campbellsville Road). The highway has staggered intersections with KY 916, which heads west as Stiles Ford Road and east as Dangerfield Road. Near the north end of the concurrency, the highways cross McDougal Creek. KY 470 meets the east end of KY 1794 (Leafdale Road) at Leafdale and crosses the North Fork of the Nolin River near its source. North of the river, the highway joins US 31E and KY 84 (Bardstown Road) in a three-route concurrency. KY 84 splits east onto Howardstown Road before KY 470 diverges from US 31E onto White City Road. KY 470 crosses Wilkins Creek before reaching its northern terminus at KY 1832 (Salem Church Road) northeast of Hodgenville. The Kentucky Transportation Cabinet established KY 470 through a March 11, 1987, official order.

Browse numbered routes
← KY 469	→ KY 471

== KY 473 ==
Kentucky Route 473
- Location: Gage–Oscar
- Length: 24.706 mi (39.760 km)

Kentucky Route 473 is a 24.706-mile-long (39.760 km) rural secondary highway in eastern Ballard County that briefly enters McCracken County. The highway extends from KY 286 at Gage north to KY 1105 near Oscar. KY 473's first segment north from Gage has several right-angle turns and crosses Humphrey Branch and Humphrey Creek, the latter of which flows into the Ohio River. The highway briefly runs concurrently with US 60 in the city of Kevil, then the route turns northeast into McCracken County. In its brief length in the county at Woodville, KY 473 has a TOTSO intersection with KY 725 from which the former route heads south and west and the latter route heads north and east.

KY 473 continues northwest along a route with several right-angle turns. The highway crosses Clanton Creek and meets the southern end of KY 1563 at Ingleside. KY 473 has a brief concurrency with KY 358 and meets the eastern end of KY 1105, from which KY 473 turns north, at Bandana. KY 473 crosses Clanton Creek again and turns west again at the west end of KY 1782 at Needmore. The highway passes through Monkeys Eyebrow and turns southwest along the edge of Ballard Wildlife Management Area, which lies between the route and the Ohio River. KY 473 turns southwest and crosses Clanton Creek a third time before reaching its northern terminus at KY 1105 northeast of Oscar. The Kentucky Transportation Cabinet transferred KY 473 from the state secondary system to the rural secondary system through a pair of November 9, 2004, official orders.

Browse numbered routes
← KY 472	→ KY 474

== KY 474 ==
Kentucky Route 474
- Location: Fort Dix–Carter
- Length: 10.170 mi (16.367 km)

Kentucky Route 474 is a 10.170-mile-long (16.367 km) rural secondary highway in eastern Lewis County and northern Carter County. The highway begins at KY 59 southeast of Camp Dix and immediately crosses Laurel Fork of Kinniconick Creek, a tributary of the Ohio River. KY 474 follows Scotts Branch Road, which runs along the eponymous creek to near the Lewis–Carter county line, where the highway turns and closely follows the watershed boundary that forms the county line. While along the county line, the highway meets the western end of KY 396 and the eastern end of KY 1149. Near Smiths Creek, KY 474 veers east deeper into Carter County. The highway follows Smiths Creek, a tributary of Tygarts Creek, east through Poplar and crosses the creek five times on its way to its terminus at KY 2 at Carter. The Kentucky Transportation Cabinet transferred KY 474 from the state secondary system to the rural secondary system through an October 11, 2004, official order.

=== History ===
KY 474 was formed between 1973 and 1976 as a renumbering of a section of KY 24 due to I-24.

The original KY 474 ran from KY 744 in Saloma southeast to US 68 in Campbellsville; this became part of KY 527 when it was extended south.

Another KY 474 was formed by 1966, running from KY 335 in Horse Cave west to Northtown; this became part of KY 218 when it was extended west by 1973, though part of this is no longer a state road.

== KY 475 ==
Kentucky Route 475
- Location: Trenton–Tress Shop
- Length: 8.176 mi (13.158 km)

Kentucky Route 475 is a 8.176-mile-long (13.158 km) rural secondary highway in western Todd County. The highway begins at US 41 (Dixie Beeline Highway) just west of the city of Trenton. KY 475 immediately intersects a rail line at grade as it heads north, then east, then north, along Tress Shop Road to US 68 and KY 80 at Tress Shop; Tress Shop Road continues on the north leg of the four-way intersection to Jefferson Davis Highway. After US 68 was placed on its current course, the Kentucky Transportation Cabinet transferred the portion of KY 475 north of current US 68 to county maintenance through a March 13, 2000, official order.

Browse numbered routes
← KY 474	→ KY 476

== KY 477 ==
Kentucky Route 477
- Location: Irvington–Frymire
- Length: 10.299 mi (16.575 km)

Kentucky Route 477 is a 10.299-mile-long (16.575 km) rural secondary highway in northern Breckinridge County and western Meade County. KY 477 begins at KY 79 just north of the city of Irvington. The highway heads west to the community of Webster, where it briefly runs concurrently with KY 261. KY 477 heads north from Webster and meets the west end of KY 283 at Raymond. The highway enters Meade County immediately before it reaches its northern terminus at KY 376 between Frymire and Payneville.

Browse numbered routes
← KY 476	→ KY 478

== KY 478 ==
Kentucky Route 478
- Location: Whitley City–Redbird
- Length: 18.758 mi (30.188 km)

Kentucky Route 478 is a 18.758-mile-long (30.188 km) rural secondary highway in eastern McCreary County and western Whitley County. The highway extends from KY 1651 in Whitley City east to KY 204 at Redbird. KY 478 begins at KY 1651 (Main Street) in the center of Whitley City, the unincorporated county seat of McCreary County. The highway heads east as Williamsburg Street, which intersects US 27 on the eastern edge of downtown. KY 478 continues along Whitley City Williamsburg Road, which has a curvaceous path through Daniel Boone National Forest. The highway crosses Laurel Creek, Bridge Fork Creek, and Marsh Creek, which all feed into the Cumberland River to the north, and meets the north end of KY 1673 (Three C Road) before entering Whitley County. KY 478 meets the east end of KY 679 (Duckrun Road) at Duckrun. The highway leaves the national forest and crosses Jellico Creek before reaching its eastern terminus at KY 204 (Redbird Road) at Redbird northwest of Williamsburg.

== KY 479 ==
Kentucky Route 479
- Location: Wax–Millerstown
- Length: 8.169 mi (13.147 km)

Kentucky Route 479 is a 8.169-mile-long (13.147 km) rural secondary highway in southeastern Grayson County. The highway begins at KY 88 at Wax. KY 479 heads northeast along Laurel Run, a tributary of the Nolin River. The highway passes to the west of Pearman and to the east of Hilltop at its intersection with KY 1214. KY 479 continues through Spike and Lone Oak on its way to its northern terminus at KY 224 (Millerstown Road) just west of the Nolin River.

Browse numbered routes
← KY 478	→ KY 480

== KY 481 ==
Kentucky Route 481
- Location: Earlington–Madisonville
- Length: 3.213 mi (5.171 km)

Kentucky Route 481 is a 3.213-mile-long (5.171 km) supplemental road in central Hopkins County. The highway runs from KY 336 and KY 2171 in Earlington north to US 41 and KY 70 in Madisonville. KY 481 begins at a four-legged intersection with east–west KY 2171 (Hubert Reid Drive) and KY 336, which heads south along North Sandcut Road toward the center of Earlington. The highway heads north along Sandcut Road, from which spurs KY 3202 (West Kentucky Road). KY 481 intersects another segment of KY 336, which heads west along McLeod Lane and east on Grapevine Road, and intersects the Paducah & Louisville Railway at grade at the south city limit of Madisonville. The highway continues northwest on Grapevine Road, then the route turns west on McLaughlin Street for one block to its terminus at US 41 and KY 70. US 41 heads south along Main Street, the two highways run concurrently north on Main Street toward downtown Madisonville, and KY 70 heads west along McLaughlin Avenue.

Browse numbered routes
← KY 480	→ KY 482

== KY 482 ==
Kentucky Route 482
- Location: Alonzo–Adolphus
- Length: 8.368 mi (13.467 km)

Kentucky Route 482 is a 8.368-mile-long (13.467 km) rural secondary highway in southern Allen County. The highway begins at KY 100 (Franklin Road) west of Alonzo. KY 482 heads south along Calvert Road and then southeast along Pleasant Ridge Church Road, which crosses the Middle Fork of Drakes Creek. At Fleet, the highway turns northeast onto Fleet Road. At Old Highway 31E, which heads south as KY 3521 through Adolphus to the Tennessee state line, KY 482 turns onto the old road and follows it and Little Trammel Creek north to the route's eastern terminus at US 31E and US 231 (New Gallatin Road).

=== History ===
KY 482 was formed in 1964, replacing part of US 31E, which was rerouted.

The original KY 482 ran from KY 93 in Newbern to US 62/US 641 near Lake City; this became part of KY 453 (which had its old route southwest replaced by US 641 in 1957).

== KY 483 ==
Kentucky Route 483
- Location: Westplains–Clear Springs
- Length: 3.085 mi (4.965 km)

Kentucky Route 483 is a 3.085-mile-long (4.965 km) supplemental road in eastern Graves County. The highway begins at KY 131 at Westplains. KY 483 heads east and meets the northern end of KY 427 just west of a branch of Dry Creek, a tributary of Clarks River. The highway crosses Trace Creek before reaching its eastern terminus at KY 301 at Clear Springs.

=== History ===
KY 483 was formed in 1954, but the original route of KY 483 is unknown.

== KY 484 ==
Kentucky Route 484
- Location: Panco–Buckhorn Lake
- Length: 4.069 mi (6.548 km)

Kentucky Route 484 is a 4.069-mile-long (6.548 km) highway in eastern Clay County and far western Perry County. The highway begins at KY 1482 at Panco and heads northeast into Perry County as a rural secondary highway. At KY 484's junction with KY 2022, the former highway continues northeast as a supplemental road that passes through Saul. The highway ends at a boat ramp at Buckhorn Lake.

== KY 485 ==
Kentucky Route 485
- Location: Dale Hollow Lake–Ellington
- Length: 10.465 mi (16.842 km)
- Existed: 1987–present

Kentucky Route 485 is a 10.465-mile-long (16.842 km) rural secondary highway in southern Cumberland County. The highway begins at a boat ramp at Dale Hollow Lake. KY 485 heads north and turns west at Kettle and intersects KY 61. The highway continues north along Guthrie Chapel Road through Tanbark. KY 485 turns west onto Whites Bottom Road at its junction with KY 3104 (Gaines Hill Road). The highway crosses Warsaw Creek and curves north through Ellington. Northeast of Ellington, KY 485 and KY 3104 have joint termini within a sweeping bend of the Cumberland River. The Kentucky Transportation Cabinet established KY 485 through a May 18, 1987, official order.

== KY 486 ==
Kentucky Route 486
- Location: Isonville–Willard
- Length: 17.028 mi (27.404 km)

Kentucky Route 486 is a 17.028-mile-long (27.404 km) rural secondary highway in eastern Elliott County and southern Carter County. The highway extends from KY 32 near Isonville north to KY 1 near Willard. KY 486 begins at KY 32 next to the Lick Fork of Newcombe Creek, a tributary of the Little Sandy River, south of Isonville. The highway ascends out of the creek valley and descends to the Little Fork of the Little Sandy River, which the highway follows for much of its course in Elliott County. KY 486 passes through Culver after one crossing of the Little Fork, crosses Hurricane Creek near Fielden, and crosses the Little Fork again just south of its junction with KY 409 (Bruin Road) at Stephens. The highway crosses the creek one last time before its intersection with KY 863 (Blaine Trace Road) at Dobbins. KY 486 leaves the valley of the Little Fork and meets the eastern end of KY 1122 before entering Carter County at the Elliott–Carter–Lawrence tripoint. The highway follows the north side of the Carter–Lawrence county line to its terminus at KY 1 south of Willard. KY 486 was part of the state secondary system until the Kentucky Transportation Cabinet reclassified the highway as a rural secondary highway through an October 11, 2004, official order.

== KY 487 ==
Kentucky Route 487
- Location: Exie–Gresham
- Length: 9.977 mi (16.056 km)

Kentucky Route 487 is a 9.977-mile-long (16.056 km) rural secondary highway in southern Green County. The highway begins at US 68 at Exie. KY 487 heads south across Greasy Creek, a tributary of the Little Barren River. The highway turns east at its intersection with KY 745. KY 487 crosses the South Fork of Russell Creek on its circuitous course to Fry. The highway continues northeast through Bramlett, where the highway crosses Russell Creek. KY 487 heads north on an indirect path to its northern terminus at KY 61 at Gresham.

== KY 488 ==
Kentucky Route 488
- Location: Lida
- Length: 2.076 mi (3.341 km)

Kentucky Route 488 is a 2.076-mile-long (3.341 km) rural secondary highway in eastern Laurel County. The highway begins at KY 80 (Laurel Road) near Lida. KY 488 heads north parallel to Little Sandy Creek, a tributary of the Laurel River. The highway passes under the Hal Rogers Parkway then curves east, crosses over Little Sandy Creek, and reaches its northern terminus at KY 1305 (Tom Cat Trail). The Kentucky Transportation Cabinet reclassified KY 488 from a supplemental highway to a rural secondary highway through a February 21, 2011, official order.

=== History ===
KY 488 was formed after 1955.

The original KY 488 ran from US 41 in Mortons Gap northeast to White City; part of this road became part of KY 813 and the rest (White City Road) was later reinstated as KY 1633 until the late 1970s.

== KY 489 ==
Kentucky Route 489
- Location: Williamstown
- Length: 4.107 mi (6.610 km)

Kentucky Route 489 is a 4.107-mile-long (6.610 km) supplemental road in eastern Grant County. The highway is split into two disjoint segments by the South Fork of Grassy Creek at Williamstown Lake on the east side of Williamstown. The 3.044-mile-long (4.899 km) southern segment of KY 489, which is almost entirely within the city limits of Williamstown, begins at KY 22 and heads northeast along Fairview Road. At KY 2362, the highway turns north onto Draper Road, which the route follows until the end of state maintenance south of the dam at the east end of the lake. The 1.063-mile-long (1.711 km) northern segment of KY 489 begins north of the dam and follows Day Road north to KY 467 (Knoxville Road).

=== History ===
KY 489 originally ran from KY 453 in Kentucky Dam to US 62 (now KY 93) in Kuttawa. This became part of US 641 in 1955, and KY 489 was reassigned as a renumbering of Kentucky Route 641 to avoid duplication.

Browse numbered routes
← KY 488	→ KY 490

== KY 491 ==
Kentucky Route 491
- Location: Verona–DeMossville
- Length: 16.801 mi (27.039 km)

Kentucky Route 491 is a 16.801-mile-long (27.039 km) rural secondary highway in southeastern Boone County, northern Grant County, and northwestern Pendleton County. The highway extends from KY 14 and KY 16 at Verona east via Crittenden to KY 17 near DeMossville. KY 491 begins at a four-legged intersection with KY 14 and KY 16 at Verona. KY 14 heads west on Verona–Mudlick Road, KY 16 heads southwest on Glencoe–Verona Road, and the two highways run concurrently east on Walton–Verona Road. KY 491 heads south on Lebanon–Crittenden Road, which intersects CSX's LCL Subdivision rail line. The highway meets the north end of KY 1942 (Mount Zion–Verona Road) immediately before the former highway enters Grant County next to Bullock Pen Lake. KY 491 follows Lebanon Road east to the west city limit of Crittenden near I-75.

As KY 491 approaches I-75, the highway curves north and briefly parallels the southbound sides of the Interstate highway then curves northwest to an intersection with KY 2363 (Violet Road), where the highway turns southeast onto Violet Road and has a diamond interchange with I-75. KY 491 has intersections with KY 3373 (Lebanon Road) on either side of its intersection with KY 2363, the latter junction just west of the southbound I-75 ramps. East of I-75, the highway intersects and runs concurrently south with US 25 (Main Street). At the south end of the city, KY 491 splits east from US 25 onto Gardnersville Road, which immediately intersects CSX's CC Subdivision rail line, passes by Leary Lake, and passes through Curtis Gates Lloyd Wildlife Management Area. The highway passes through Flingsville before it enters Pendleton County. KY 491 meets the west end of KY 3184 (Center Ridge Road) at Gardnersville, then the highway continues northeast to its terminus at KY 17 in the valley of Grassy Creek, a tributary of the Licking River, west of DeMossville.

Browse numbered routes
← KY 490	→ KY 492

== KY 492 ==
Kentucky Route 492
- Location: Dekoven–Hamner
- Length: 11.014 mi (17.725 km)

Kentucky Route 492 is a 11.014-mile-long (17.725 km) highway with rural secondary and supplemental road sections in western Union County. The western rural secondary portion begins at KY 667 at Dekoven. KY 492 runs concurrently with KY 1508 before it splits east toward KY 109 northwest of Sturgis. The highway heads northwest with KY 109, then it turns northwest onto a concurrence with KY 270 southeast of Henshaw. KY 492 continues along its supplemental road section, which crosses Wash Creek at its junction with KY 2101 south of Grove Center. The highway follows Wash Creek east, then the route continues northeast and crosses Eagle Creek immediately before its eastern terminus at US 60 at Hamner.

== KY 493 ==
Kentucky Route 493
- Location: Fairmont–Wheatcroft
- Length: 2.196 mi (3.534 km)

Kentucky Route 493 is a 2.196-mile-long (3.534 km) supplemental road in western Webster County. The highway begins at KY 132 at Fairmont. KY 493 heads north parallel to a rail line, then the route veers away from the railroad through several sharp curves. The highway reaches its northern terminus at KY 109 east of the city of Wheatcroft.

== KY 494 ==
Kentucky Route 494
- Location: Sebree
- Length: 2.218 mi (3.570 km)

Kentucky Route 494 is a 2.218-mile-long (3.570 km) supplemental road in eastern Webster County. The highway begins at KY 132 southwest of Sebree. KY 494 heads east and intersects a north–south CSX rail line before reaching its eastern terminus at US 41 south of Sebree.

Browse numbered routes
← KY 493	→ KY 495

== KY 495 ==
Kentucky Route 495
- Location: Francisville-Bullittsville
- Length: 2.206 mi (3.550 km)

Kentucky Route 495 is a 2.206-mile-long (3.550 km) secondary road in Boone County, running from KY 20 to KY 237. It is also known as Graves Road. The road was designated on August 31, 2022.

The original KY 495 ran from US 41 south of Sebree southwest to KY 138 in Webster County. That route was decommissioned on September 27, 1993, with the section southwest of KY 1835 becoming part of KY 1835 and the remainder being given to the county; that section is now known as Breton Road.

== KY 496 ==
Kentucky Route 496
- Location: Marrowbone–Edmonton
- Length: 15.477 mi (24.908 km)

Kentucky Route 496 is a 15.477-mile-long (24.908 km) rural secondary highway in eastern Cumberland County and eastern Metcalfe County. The highway extends from KY 90 near Marrowbone north to KY 163 in Edmonton. KY 496 begins at KY 90 (Glasgow Road) east of the hamlet of Marrowbone in the valley of Marrowbone Creek. The highway crosses Franklin Branch of Casey Fork and follows Casey Fork through the same-named hamlet, where the route crosses the stream, and enters Metcalfe County. KY 496 ascends to the headwaters of a branch of Casey Fork and passes by the source of the South Fork of the Little Barren River before heading northwest along the ridge between the South Fork and the East Fork to the north. West of its junction with KY 2390, the highway descends to and crosses Old Well Branch of the South Fork. KY 496 veers west at its intersection with KY 533 and enters the city of Edmonton at its bridge across the South Fork of the Little Barren River. As the route approaches the town center, it curves north onto Beauchamp Street and west onto Hamilton Street to its terminus at KY 163 (Main Street) next to the Metcalfe County Courthouse one block south of KY 163's northern terminus at US 68 and KY 80.

Browse numbered routes
← KY 495	→ KY 497

== KY 497 ==
Kentucky Route 497
- Location: Hico
- Length: 2.635 mi (4.241 km)

Kentucky Route 497 is a 2.635-mile-long (4.241 km) supplemental road in eastern Calloway County. The highway begins at KY 94 east of Hico and to the south of Kenlake State Resort Park. KY 497 heads east on a curvaceous path that takes the route to its end at the barge terminal entrance on the west shore of Kentucky Lake.

Browse numbered routes
← KY 496	→ KY 498
