= Headwater darter =

Conservation status
- Least Concern (IUCN 3.1)

Scientific classification
- Kingdom: Animalia
- Phylum: Chordata
- Class: Actinopterygii
- Order: Perciformes
- Family: Percidae
- Genus: Etheostoma
- Species: E. lawrencei

Binomial name
- Etheostoma lawrencei Ceas & Burr, 2002

Species of fish

The headwater darter (Etheostoma lawrencei) is a species of freshwater ray-finned fish, a darter from the subfamily Etheostomatinae, part of the family Percidae, which also contains the perches, ruffes and pikeperches. It is endemic to the eastern United States where it is found in Kentucky and Tennessee in the upper Green River system down to the Mud River, in the Cumberland River and upper Salt River systems. It is an inhabitant of streams up to about 5 metres (16 ft) wide with gravel or cobble substrates. Males of this species can reach a length of 6.2 centimetres (2.4 in) SL while females only reach 5.7 centimetres (2.2 in). The headwater darter was first formally described in 2002 by Patrick A. Ceas and Brooks M. Burr With the type locality given as Koger Creek, which is in the drainage of the Wolf River, about 0.8 kilometers northwest of Rolan, Kentucky along Kentucky Route 415 at the confluence of McIver Creek in Clinton County.

== Etymology ==
The specific name honors the American ichthyologist Lawrence M. Page of the Florida Museum of Natural History.
