= Dingamalarie =

Dingamalarie may refer to:

- Dingamalarie, a southern African word for a non-descript object, akin to "thingamabob", "dooverlackie" or "thingamajig"
- Dingamalarie, see also "Dingus (disambiguation)"
