= Fair dealing (disambiguation) =

Fair dealing is a concept of copyright law that grants limitations and exceptions to exclusive rights.

Fair dealing or Fairdealing may also refer to:

- The implied covenant of good faith and fair dealing, a concept in contract law
- Fairdealing, Kentucky, an unincorporated community in Marshall County
- Fairdealing, Missouri, an unincorporated community and census-designated place located in Ripley County and Butler County

== See also ==
- Fair Deal, policy of U.S. President Harry S. Truman
