= Isonville, Kentucky =

Unincorporated community in Kentucky, United States

- Unincorporated community
- Location within the state of Kentucky Isonville (the United States)
- Coordinates: 38°3′54″N 83°3′10″W
- Country: United States
- State: Kentucky
- County: Elliott
- Elevation: 709 ft (216 m)
- Time zone: UTC-5 (Eastern (EST))
  - Summer (DST): UTC-4 (EDT)
- ZIP codes: 41149
- GNIS feature ID: 495056

Isonville is an unincorporated community in Elliott County, Kentucky, United States. It lies along Routes 32 and 486 east of the city of Sandy Hook, the county seat of Elliott County. Its elevation is 709 feet (216 m). It has a post office with the ZIP code 41149.

A post office was established in the community in 1866 and named for Archibald Ison, an early settler from Virginia.
