= Dingus =

Dingus is an informal English word for a fool, a thingamajig, or a penis. It may also refer to:

- Brenda Dingus, American astrophysicist
- Eric Dingus (born 1995), American musician
- Marita Dingus (born 1956), American artist
- Dingus, Kentucky, an unincorporated community
- nickname allegedly given to the American outlaw Jesse James by his brother Frank
- title character of Dirty Dingus Magee, a 1970 Western film starring Frank Sinatra
- "Dirty" Dingus McDuck, a Disney character who is Scrooge McDuck's grandfather

== See also ==
- Śmigus-Dyngus, a Polish holiday, called Dyngus Day by Polish Americans
- Dinkus, a typographic symbol or symbols
