= Clarks River =

River in Kentucky, United States

Coordinates: 37.047835°N 88.542268°W

The Clarks River, named for William Clark of the 1804-1806 Lewis and Clark Expedition, is a 66.7-mile-long (107.3 km) tributary of the Tennessee River in the Jackson Purchase region of western Kentucky. Below the West Fork Clarks River, the river has a mean annual discharge of 368 cubic feet per second. This figure is obtained by combining the average discharge of the Clarks River at Benton, and the average discharge of the West Fork at Brewers.

== Two forks ==
For the greater part of its length, it consists of two parallel forks of approximately equal size, the East Fork and the West Fork. The East Fork, shown on federal maps as the main stem of the river, begins south of Murray near the community of Puryear in Henry County, Tennessee and is paralleled by the Paducah, Tennessee and Alabama Railroad. The West Fork begins about 4 miles (6 km) west of Murray near the intersection of Jones-Sparkman and Butterworth Roads in Calloway County and flows through Kaler and Symsonia in Graves County before joining with the East Fork at Oaks Station in McCracken County.

== Artifacts ==
The Clarks River streams from Murray in Calloway County through Benton in Marshall County and ends in Paducah (McCracken County), where the mouth of the river intersects with the Tennessee River just before the Tennessee River joins the Ohio River. This river is full of wildlife including the venomous water moccasin snake. Documented evidence states that many Native American encampments and Indian tribes camped and lived along its banks. To this day artifacts have been found including spearheads, arrowheads and pottery.

The river is the namesake of Clarks River Road in Paducah.

== See also ==
- List of rivers of Kentucky
