= Melvin, Kentucky =

Unincorporated community in Kentucky, United States

- Unincorporated community
- Location within the state of Kentucky Melvin (the United States)
- Coordinates: 37°21′1″N 82°41′39″W
- Country: United States
- State: Kentucky
- County: Floyd
- Elevation: 1,083 ft (330 m)
- Time zone: UTC-5 (Eastern (EST))
  - Summer (DST): UTC-4 (EDT)
- ZIP codes: 41650
- GNIS feature ID: 498053

Melvin is an unincorporated community and coal town in Floyd County, Kentucky, United States.

== Geography ==
Melvin is located on Kentucky Route 122 at the northern terminus of Kentucky Route 466.
