= Stephens, Kentucky =

Unincorporated community in Kentucky, United States

- Unincorporated community
- Location within the state of Kentucky Stephens (the United States)
- Coordinates: 38°8′7″N 82°57′32″W
- Country: United States
- State: Kentucky
- County: Elliott
- Elevation: 628 ft (191 m)
- Time zone: UTC-5 (Eastern (EST))
  - Summer (DST): UTC-4 (EDT)
- GNIS feature ID: 509125

Stephens is an unincorporated community in Elliott County, Kentucky, United States. It lies along Routes 409 and 486 northeast of the city of Sandy Hook, the county seat of Elliott County. Its elevation is 628 feet (208 m).
