= Kettle, Kentucky =

Unincorporated community in Kentucky, United States

Kettle
- Unincorporated community
- Location within the state of Kentucky Kettle (the United States)
- Coordinates: 36°42′8″N 85°21′40″W
- Country: United States
- State: Kentucky
- County: Cumberland
- Elevation: 984 ft (300 m)
- Time zone: UTC-6 (Central (CST))
  - Summer (DST): UTC-5 (CDT)
- GNIS feature ID: 508385

Kettle is an unincorporated community in Cumberland County, Kentucky, United States.

== Geography ==
The community is located near the junction of Routes 61 and 485 south of the city of Burkesville, the county seat of Cumberland County. Its elevation is 984 feet (300 m).

== History ==
The community was named after a creek of the same name.
