= Alonzo, Kentucky =

Unincorporated community in Kentucky, United States

- Unincorporated community
- Location within Kentucky
- Coordinates: 36°41′35″N 86°20′41″W
- Country: United States
- State: Kentucky
- County: Allen
- Elevation: 594 ft (181 m)
- Time zone: UTC-6 (Central (CST))
  - Summer (DST): UTC-5 (CDT)
- GNIS feature ID: 485895

Alonzo is an unincorporated community in Allen County, Kentucky, United States. The community is located on Kentucky Route 482. Kentucky Route 100 travels west of the community.
