= Guston, Kentucky =

Unincorporated community in Kentucky, United States

Guston is a rural unincorporated community in Meade County, Kentucky, United States, a few miles southwest of Brandenburg on KY 428.

A post office was established in the community in 1889. Guston was named for area resident Gustavia "Gus" W. Richardson.

== Geography ==
Battletown is located at 37°53′33.75″N 86°13′18.25″W.
