= Bruin, Kentucky =

Unincorporated community in Kentucky, United States

- Unincorporated community
- Location within the state of Kentucky Bruin (the United States)
- Coordinates: 38°10′30″N 83°1′32″W
- Country: United States
- State: Kentucky
- County: Elliott
- Elevation: 689 ft (210 m)
- Time zone: UTC-5 (Eastern (EST))
  - Summer (DST): UTC-4 (EDT)
- ZIP codes: 41125
- GNIS feature ID: 507598

Bruin is an unincorporated community in Elliott County, Kentucky, United States. It lies along Kentucky routes 7 and 409 just south of Grayson Lake State Park. Bruin is northeast of the county seat, Sandy Hook. Its elevation is 689 feet (210 m).

The post office was established on 28 December 1869 by Samuel Mobley The community was named after Bruin Creek which flows parallel to Route 7 on the east side.
