= Loyall, Kentucky =

- City
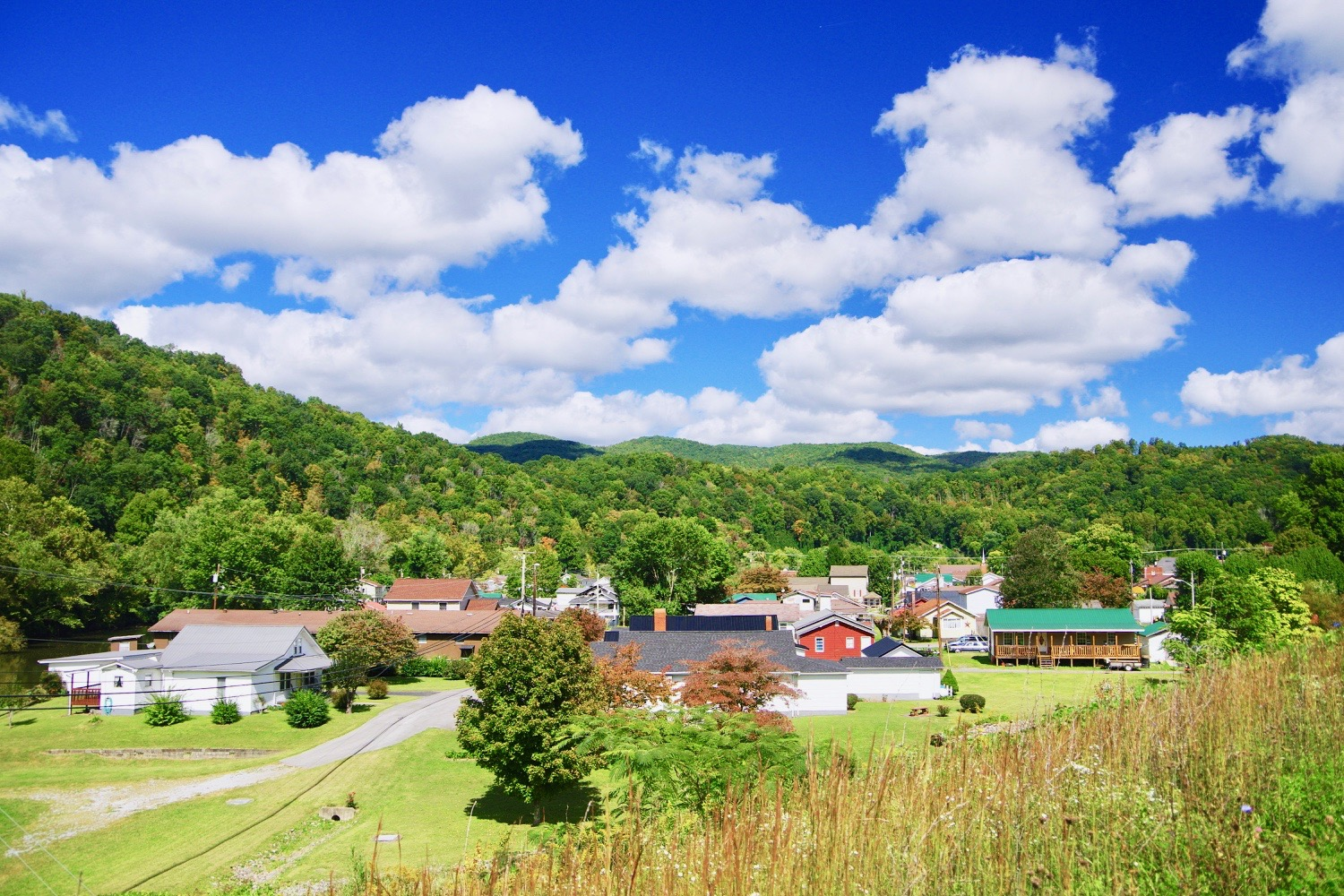
- Loyall from KY 840

- Location of Loyall in Harlan County, Kentucky.
- Coordinates: 36°51′7″N 83°21′10″W
- Country: United States
- State: Kentucky
- County: Harlan
- Incorporated: 1924

Government
  - Type: Mayor-Council
  - Mayor: Rodrick Major

Area
  - Total: 0.32 sq mi (0.84 km^{2})
  - Land: 0.29 sq mi (0.76 km^{2})
  - Water: 0.031 sq mi (0.08 km^{2})
- Elevation: 1,175 ft (358 m)

Population (2020)
  - Total: 638
  - Density: 2,163.0/sq mi (835.15/km^{2})
- Time zone: UTC-5 (Eastern (EST))
  - Summer (DST): UTC-4 (EDT)
- ZIP code: 40854
- Area code: 606
- FIPS code: 21-48288
- GNIS feature ID: 0497327

Loyall (/ˈloʊəl/) is a home rule-class city in Harlan County, Kentucky, in the United States. As of the 2020 census, Loyall had a population of 638.

== History ==
The community grew up around a Louisville and Nashville Railroad switching yard and maintenance facility, first constructed in 1920. The local post office (est. 1922) was originally known as "Shonn", from local slang for a rail siding. The name "Loyall" was adopted in 1932. It remains unclear if it honors a company official or some other resident.

== Geography ==
Loyall is located in western Harlan County at 36°51′7″N 83°21′10″W (36.852046, -83.352870) in the valley of the Cumberland River, near its source. It is 3 miles (5 km) by road northwest of Harlan, the county seat. U.S. Route 119 bypasses the city to the north, leading northeast 23 miles (37 km) to Cumberland and southwest 28 miles (45 km) to its terminus in Pineville.

According to the United States Census Bureau, Loyall has a total area of 1.4 square miles (3.7 km^{2}), of which 1.4 square miles (3.5 km^{2}) are land and 0.1 square miles (0.2 km^{2}), or 6.05%, are water. The city's area has more than quadrupled since 2000, when it was reported as 0.3 square miles (0.78 km^{2}), all of it land.

== Demographics ==
Historical population
Census	Pop.	Note	%±
1930	1,468		—
1940	1,600		9.0%
1950	1,548		−3.2%
1960	1,260		−18.6%
1970	1,212		−3.8%
1980	1,210		−0.2%
1990	1,100		−9.1%
2000	766		−30.4%
2010	671		−12.4%
2020	638		−4.9%
U.S. Decennial Census

As of the census of 2000, there were 766 people, 339 households, and 227 families living in the city. The population density was 2,246.5 inhabitants per square mile (867.4/km^{2}). There were 368 housing units at an average density of 1,079.3 per square mile (416.7/km^{2}). The racial makeup of the city was 97.91% White, 0.78% Native American, 0.52% Asian, and 0.78% from two or more races. Hispanic or Latino of any race were 0.13% of the population.

There were 339 households, out of which 26.0% had children under the age of 18 living with them, 50.7% were married couples living together, 11.5% had a female householder with no husband present, and 33.0% were non-families. 31.6% of all households were made up of individuals, and 13.6% had someone living alone who was 65 years of age or older. The average household size was 2.26 and the average family size was 2.82.

In the city, the population was spread out, with 20.6% under the age of 18, 8.9% from 18 to 24, 28.7% from 25 to 44, 26.2% from 45 to 64, and 15.5% who were 65 years of age or older. The median age was 40 years. For every 100 females, there were 86.8 males. For every 100 females age 18 and over, there were 81.0 males.

The median income for a household in the city was $26,250, and the median income for a family was $31,607. Males had a median income of $25,893 versus $20,313 for females. The per capita income for the city was $14,997. About 15.8% of families and 15.9% of the population were below the poverty line, including 17.5% of those under age 18 and 14.3% of those age 65 or over.
