= Bow, Kentucky =

Unincorporated community in Kentucky, United States

Bow
- Unincorporated community
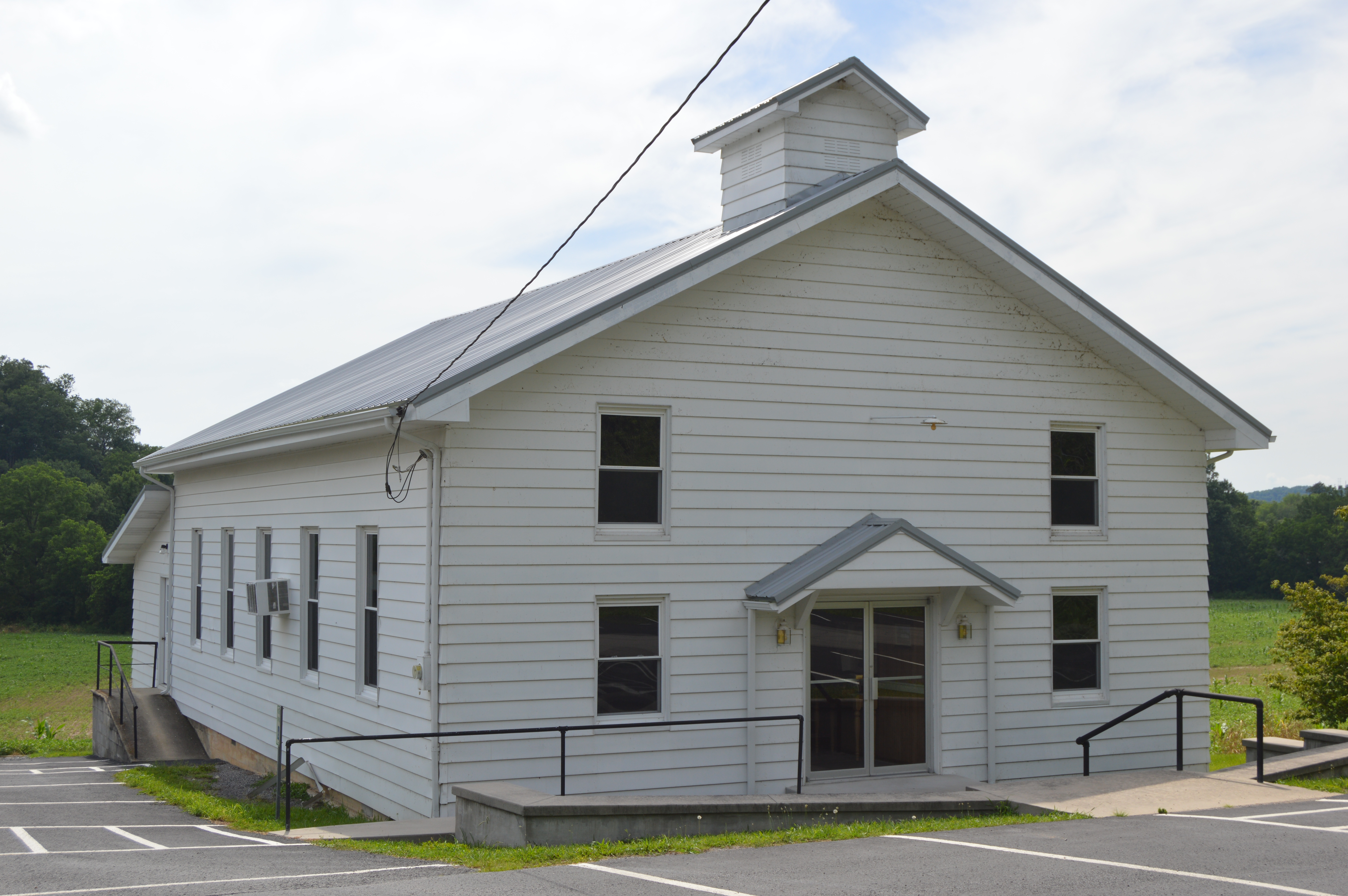
- Liberty United Methodist Church

- Location within the state of Kentucky Bow (the United States)
- Coordinates: 36°45′45″N 85°20′42″W
- Country: United States
- State: Kentucky
- County: Cumberland
- Elevation: 607 ft (185 m)
- Time zone: UTC-6 (Central (CST))
  - Summer (DST): UTC-5 (CDT)
- GNIS feature ID: 507563

Bow is an unincorporated community in Cumberland County, Kentucky, United States.

== Geography ==
The community is located along Route 90 southeast of the city of Burkesville, the county seat of Cumberland County. Its elevation is 607 feet (185 m).
