= Thruston, Kentucky =

Unincorporated community in Kentucky, United States

Thruston
- Census-designated place
- Location within the state of Kentucky Thruston (the United States)
- Coordinates: 37.801°N 87.026°W
- Country: United States
- State: Kentucky
- County: Daviess

Area
  - Total: 1.77 sq mi (4.58 km^{2})
  - Land: 1.76 sq mi (4.57 km^{2})
  - Water: 0.0039 sq mi (0.01 km^{2})

Population (2020)
  - Total: 2,234
  - Density: 1,265.9/sq mi (488.75/km^{2})
- Time zone: UTC-6 (Central (CST))
  - Summer (DST): UTC-5 (CST)
- FIPS code: 21-76620
- GNIS feature ID: 509210

Thruston is an unincorporated community located in Daviess County in the U.S. state of Kentucky, northeast of Owensboro. As of the 2020 census, Thruston had a population of 2,234.

The community is named after Algernon Sidney Thruston, a veteran of the Texas Revolution, who owned a plantation in the region.

== Demographics ==
Historical population
Census	Pop.	Note	%±
2020	2,234		—
U.S. Decennial Census

=== 2020 census ===
As of the 2020 census, Thruston had a population of 2,234. The median age was 34.7 years. 29.2% of residents were under the age of 18 and 16.5% of residents were 65 years of age or older. For every 100 females there were 102.9 males, and for every 100 females age 18 and over there were 95.8 males age 18 and over.

96.1% of residents lived in urban areas, while 3.9% lived in rural areas.

There were 793 households in Thruston, of which 35.2% had children under the age of 18 living in them. Of all households, 49.2% were married-couple households, 21.3% were households with a male householder and no spouse or partner present, and 22.7% were households with a female householder and no spouse or partner present. About 24.0% of all households were made up of individuals and 10.9% had someone living alone who was 65 years of age or older.

There were 845 housing units, of which 6.2% were vacant. The homeowner vacancy rate was 0.9% and the rental vacancy rate was 9.4%.

Racial composition as of the 2020 census
Race	Number	Percent
White	2,016	90.2%
Black or African American	38	1.7%
American Indian and Alaska Native	8	0.4%
Asian	5	0.2%
Native Hawaiian and Other Pacific Islander	1	0.0%
Some other race	23	1.0%
Two or more races	143	6.4%
Hispanic or Latino (of any race)	108	4.8%
