= Curdsville, Kentucky =

Unincorporated community in Kentucky, United States

Curdsville
- Census-designated place
- Location within the state of Kentucky Curdsville (the United States)
- Coordinates: 37°44′6″N 87°19′54″W
- Country: United States
- State: Kentucky
- County: Daviess

Area
  - Total: 0.27 sq mi (0.69 km^{2})
  - Land: 0.27 sq mi (0.69 km^{2})
  - Water: 0 sq mi (0.00 km^{2})
- Elevation: 384 ft (117 m)

Population (2020)
  - Total: 94
  - Density: 351.5/sq mi (135.73/km^{2})
- Time zone: UTC-6 (Central (CST))
  - Summer (DST): UTC-5 (CST)
- FIPS code: 21-19288
- GNIS feature ID: 490493

Curdsville is an unincorporated community and census-designated place (CDP) located in Daviess County, Kentucky, United States. The population was 94 as of the 2020 census.

The area was first settled by William Glenn in 1797, who was originally from Nelson County and was the son of celebrated Kentucky pioneer David Glenn. William would later serve as colonel of the local "cornstalk" militia following the War of 1812 as well as a representative in the state legislature in 1817 and sheriff of Daviess County from 1821 to 1823.

According to legend, an early settler was paid a barrel of whiskey to name the town after H. T. Curd, a steamboat captain on the nearby Green River.

== Demographics ==
Historical population
Census	Pop.	Note	%±
2020	94		—
U.S. Decennial Census
