= Roark, Kentucky =

Unincorporated community in Kentucky, United States

- Unincorporated community
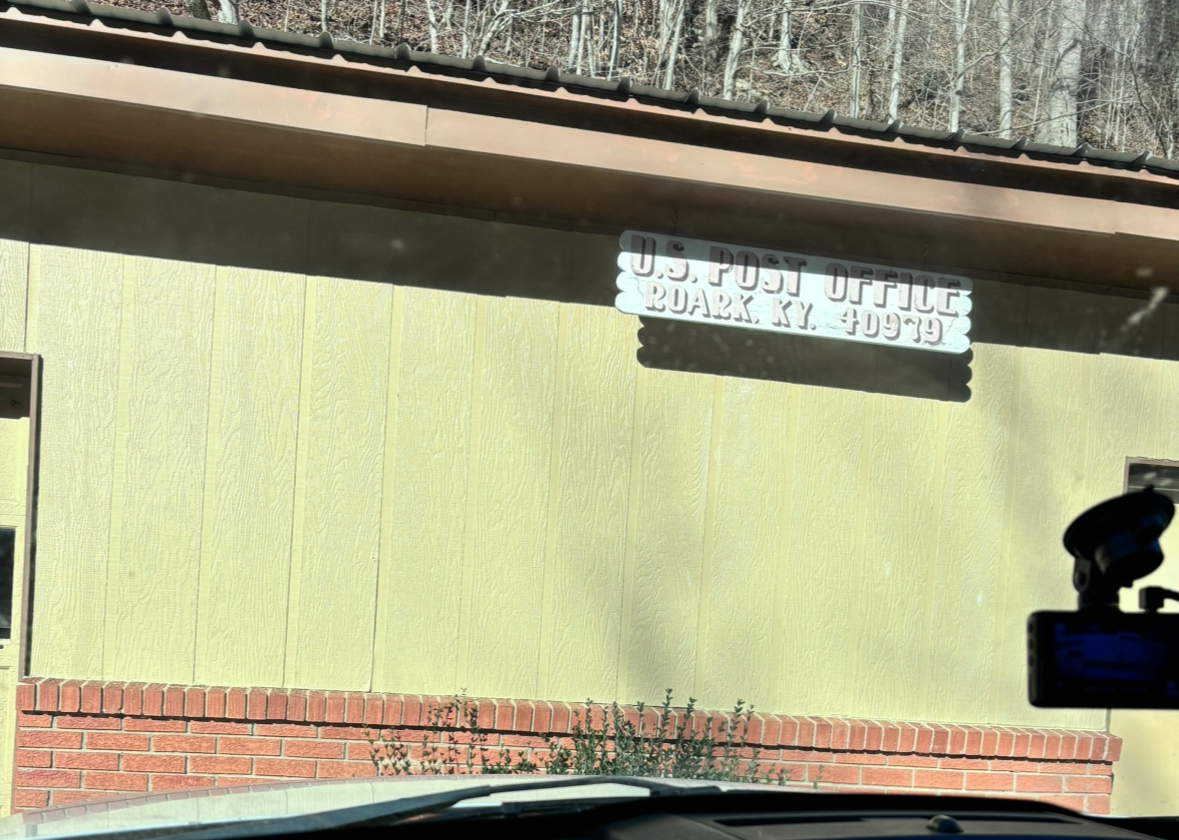
- U.S. Post Office in Roark

- Location in Kentucky Location in the United States
- Coordinates: 37°1′21″N 83°30′55″W
- Country: United States
- State: Kentucky
- County: Leslie
- Elevation: 1,043 ft (318 m)
- Time zone: UTC-5 (Eastern (EST))
  - Summer (DST): UTC-4 (CDT)
- ZIP codes: 40979
- GNIS feature ID: 514994

Roark is an unincorporated community located in Leslie County, Kentucky, United States. Main schools, Redbird Christian, Leslie, Stinnet Elementary, and Mountain View elementary. It is the birthplace of the Osborne Brothers.
