= Pup Creek =

Stream in Daviess County, Kentucky, U.S.

Coordinates: 37.8342164°N 87.0438848°W

Pup Creek is a stream in Daviess County, Kentucky, in the United States. It is a tributary of the Ohio River.

Pup Creek was so named from an incident when pioneers drowned puppies in this stream.

== See also ==
- List of rivers of Kentucky
