= Empire, Kentucky =

- Unincorporated community
- Location within Kentucky
- Coordinates: 37°5′11″N 87°29′50″W
- Country: United States
- State: Kentucky
- County: Christian
- Elevation: 515 ft (157 m)
- GNIS feature ID: 491774

Empire is an unincorporated community and coal town in Christian County, Kentucky, United States.
