= Hico, Kentucky =

Unincorporated community in Kentucky, United States

- Unincorporated community
- Location within the state of Kentucky Hico (the United States)
- Coordinates: 36°43′46″N 88°11′00″W
- Country: United States
- State: Kentucky
- County: Calloway
- Elevation: 518 ft (158 m)
- Time zone: UTC-6 (Central (CST))
  - Summer (DST): UTC-5 (CST)
- GNIS feature ID: 508232

Hico is an unincorporated community in Calloway County, Kentucky, United States.
