= Viola, Kentucky =

Unincorporated community in Kentucky, United States

- Unincorporated community
- Location within Kentucky Location within the United States
- Coordinates: 36°51′20″N 88°38′29″W
- Country: United States
- State: Kentucky
- County: Graves
- Elevation: 404 ft (123 m)
- Time zone: UTC-6 (Central (CST))
  - Summer (DST): UTC-5 (CDT)
- ZIP Code: 42051
- GNIS feature ID: 506063

Viola is an unincorporated community in Graves County, Kentucky, United States.
