= Weeksbury, Kentucky =

Unincorporated community in Kentucky, United States

- Unincorporated community
- Location within the state of Kentucky Weeksbury (the United States)
- Coordinates: 37°19′40″N 82°41′18″W
- Country: United States
- State: Kentucky
- County: Floyd
- Elevation: 1,178 ft (359 m)
- Time zone: UTC-5 (Eastern (EST))
  - Summer (DST): UTC-4 (EST)
- ZIP codes: 41667
- GNIS feature ID: 509333

Weeksbury is an unincorporated community and coal town in Floyd County, Kentucky, United States. It was also known as Weeksburg. It is on Kentucky Route 466.
