= Bullock Pen Lake =

- Location within Kentucky Location within the United States
- Location: Boat Dock Rd. Boone / Grant counties, Kentucky, United States
- Coordinates: 38°47′35″N 84°38′41″W
- Type: reservoir
- Basin countries: United States
- Surface area: 134 acres (54 ha)
- Surface elevation: 761 ft (232 m)

Bullock Pen Lake, located between Boone County and Grant County in Kentucky, is a 134 acres (54 ha) reservoir constructed in 1963 by the damming of Bullock Pen Creek. Accessibility and boat ramp located on Boat Dock Rd.
