= Tress Shop, Kentucky =

Unincorporated community in Kentucky, United States

Tress Shop
- Unincorporated community
- Location within the state of Kentucky Tress Shop (the United States)
- Coordinates: 36°49′44″N 87°13′6″W
- Country: United States
- State: Kentucky
- County: Todd
- Elevation: 679 ft (207 m)
- Time zone: UTC-6 (Central (CST))
  - Summer (DST): UTC-5 (CDT)
- GNIS feature ID: 509231

Tress Shop is an unincorporated community located in Todd County, Kentucky, United States.
