= Mannington, Kentucky =

- Unincorporated community
- Location within Kentucky
- Coordinates: 37°7′12″N 87°29′15″W
- Country: United States
- State: Kentucky
- County: Christian
- Elevation: 456 ft (139 m)
- GNIS feature ID: 497498

Mannington is an unincorporated community and coal town in Christian County, Kentucky, United States.
