= Stinnett, Kentucky =

Unincorporated community in Kentucky, United States

- Unincorporated community
- Location within Kentucky Location within the United States
- Coordinates: 37°5′24″N 83°23′42″W
- Country: United States
- State: Kentucky
- County: Leslie
- Elevation: 909 ft (277 m)
- Time zone: UTC-5 (Eastern (EST))
  - Summer (DST): UTC-4 (EDT)
- ZIP code: 40868
- Area code: 606

Stinnett is an unincorporated community in Leslie County, Kentucky, United States.

== Geography ==
Stinnett is located at 37°5′24″N 83°23′42″W (37.09, -83.39500).
