= Hamlin, Kentucky =

Unincorporated community in Kentucky, United States

- Unincorporated community
- Location within the state of Kentucky Hamlin (the United States)
- Coordinates: 36°35′54″N 88°4′35″W
- Country: United States
- State: Kentucky
- County: Calloway
- Elevation: 417 ft (127 m)
- Time zone: UTC-6 (Central (CST))
  - Summer (DST): UTC-5 (CST)
- ZIP codes: 42046
- Area code: 270
- GNIS feature ID: 508168

Hamlin is an unincorporated community in Calloway County, Kentucky, United States.

The community had a post office from February 9, 1885, to February 1, 1988.
