= Redbird, Kentucky =

Unincorporated community in Kentucky, United States

Redbird
- Unincorporated community
- Location within the state of Kentucky Redbird (the United States)
- Coordinates: 36°45′43″N 84°13′12″W
- Country: United States
- State: Kentucky
- County: Whitley
- Elevation: 915 ft (279 m)
- Time zone: UTC-5 (Eastern (EST))
  - Summer (DST): UTC-4 (EST)
- GNIS feature ID: 514874

Redbird is an unincorporated community located in Whitley County, Kentucky, United States.
