= Dingus, Kentucky =

Unincorporated community in Kentucky, United States

- Unincorporated community
- Location within Kentucky Location within the United States
- Coordinates: 37°54′29″N 83°06′08″W
- Country: United States
- State: Kentucky
- County: Morgan
- Elevation: 883 ft (269 m)
- Time zone: UTC-5 (Eastern (EST))
  - Summer (DST): UTC-4 (EDT)
- GNIS feature ID: 507856

Dingus is an unincorporated community in Morgan County, Kentucky on Kentucky Highway 437, between Elamton and Mima. The town is located 14 miles from West Liberty, the county seat. There was formerly a post office in the town, but residents are now served by the post office at Elkfork, Kentucky (41421). Dingus lies at an elevation of 883 feet (269 m).

The community was named for early postmaster Charles B. Dingus.
