= Fairdealing, Kentucky =

Unincorporated community in Kentucky, United States

- Unincorporated community
- Location within Kentucky Location within the United States
- Coordinates: 36°50′48″N 88°14′21″W
- Country: United States
- State: Kentucky
- County: Marshall
- Elevation: 459 ft (140 m)
- Time zone: UTC-6 (Central (CST))
  - Summer (DST): UTC-5 (CDT)
- Area code: 270
- GNIS feature ID: 507968

Fairdealing is an unincorporated community in Marshall County, Kentucky, United States. Fairdealing is located on U.S. Route 68, 6.2 miles (10.0 km) east of Benton.

In 1838, a post office was established in the community said to be named for storekeeper whose deals were perceived as fair. The post office was discontinued in 1908.
