= Elamton, Kentucky =

Unincorporated community in Kentucky, United States

- Unincorporated community
- Location within Kentucky Location within the United States
- Coordinates: 37°55′39″N 83°08′51″W
- Country: United States
- State: Kentucky
- County: Morgan
- Elevation: 833 ft (254 m)
- Time zone: UTC-5 (Eastern (EST))
  - Summer (DST): UTC-4 (EDT)
- GNIS feature ID: 507915

Elamton is an unincorporated community in Morgan County, Kentucky. Elamton lies at an elevation of 833 feet (254 m).

A post office was established in the community in 1883, and named for its postmaster James S. Elam.
