= Rolan, Kentucky =

Unincorporated community in Kentucky, United States

- Unincorporated community
- Location within Kentucky
- Coordinates: 36°39′07″N 85°02′00″W
- Country: United States
- State: Kentucky
- County: Clinton
- Elevation: 915 ft (279 m)
- Time zone: UTC-6 (Central (CST))
  - Summer (DST): UTC-5 (CDT)
- Area code: 606
- GNIS feature ID: 508963

Rolan is an unincorporated community in Clinton County, Kentucky, United States.
