= Kentucky Route 339 =

State highway in Kentucky, United States

Kentucky Route 339
- KY 339 highlighted in red

Route information
- Maintained by KYTC
- Length: 45.513 mi (73.246 km)

Major junctions
- South end: KY 564 north or Cooksville
- KY 97 / KY 381 in Sedalia; KY 303 near Payne; US 45 in Wingo; I-69 in Wingo; KY 58 in Hollifield; KY 80 in Fancy Farm; KY 121 near Wheel
- North end: US 45 on the Massac–Hendron

Location
- Country: United States
- State: Kentucky
- Counties: Graves, McCracken

Highway system
- Kentucky State Highway System; Interstate; US; State; Parkways
← KY 338	→ KY 340

Kentucky Route 339 (KY 339) is a 45.513-mile-long (73.246 km) state highway in the U.S. state of Kentucky. The highway connects mostly rural areas of Graves and McCracken counties with Wingo, Massac, and Hendron.

== Route description ==
=== Graves County ===
==== Southern terminus to Hollifield ====
KY 339 begins at an intersection with KY 564 north of Crossville, within the southeastern part of Graves. Here, the roadway continues as Antioch Church Road. It travels to the west-southwest and crosses over Mayfield Creek. It curves to the west-northwest and crosses over Leech Creek. It begins a brief concurrency with KY 97. They enter Sedalia, where they split at an intersection with KY 381. After KY 339 leaves Sedalia, it travels to the west-northwest and intersects KY 303. The highway curves to the west-southwest and enters Stubblefield, where it intersects the southern terminus of KY 1748. Just after leaving the community, it crosses over Obion Creek. It then intersects the northern terminus of KY 129. The highway curves to the west-northwest and enters Wingo. It intersects U.S. Route 45 (US 45). The two highways travel concurrently to the north-northeast. When KY 339 splits off, it resumes its west-northwest direction and briefly leaves the city limits of Wingo. When it re-enters Wingo, it has an interchange with Interstate 69 (I-69). At this interchange, KY 339 curves to the northwest. It enters Hollifield, where it intersects KY 58. The two highways have a one-block concurrency.

==== Hollifield to Fancy Farm ====
KY 339 turns right, to the north-northeast. It then curves to the north-northwest and has a second crossing of Obion Creek. It curves back to the north-northeast and then to a due north direction before it intersects both KY 1748 and the western terminus of KY 384. KY 339 and KY 1748 travel concurrently to the west and curve to the west-northwest. They cross over some railroad tracks of the Central Illinois Railroad (CIR). They curve to the west-southwest and enter Dublin. There, at an intersection with the eastern terminus of Dublin Hill Road, they turn right to the north-northeast. The two highways curve to the north-northwest and split. KY 339 heads to the north-northeast and crosses over McClane Creek. It curves to the north and intersects the eastern terminus of KY 1686 and then crosses over Barnes Creek. The highway enters Fancy Farm. It passes Fancy Farm Elementary School and curves to the north-northeast. It then passes a U.S. Post Office before a one-block concurrency with KY 80.

==== Fancy Farm to Melber ====
After KY 339 leaves Fancy Farm, it crosses over West Fork Mayfield Creek. It intersects the western terminus of KY 1213 before it curves to the north-northwest. KY 339 curves back to the north-northeast and intersects KY 121. It begins paralleling railroad tracks of the CIR, curves to the north-northwest and crosses over Goose Creek before a very brief concurrency with KY 408. It curves to the north-northwest before it curves to a due east direction and travels under a railroad bridge that carries those railroad tracks. It curves to the north-northeast and crosses over Wilson Creek. The highway curves to the north-northwest and enters Lowes. It passes Lowes Cemetery and Lowes Elementary School before intersecting the western terminus of KY 2588 (School Street). Then, it intersects the northern terminus of KY 440. The highway passes a U.S. Post Office and enters downtown Lowes, where it has a brief concurrency with KY 849. When they split, KY 339 resumes its north-northeasterly direction. It curves to the east and crosses over Brush Creek. KY 339 heads to the north-northeast and passes Heard Cemetery before it heads to a due north direction. It intersects the southern terminus of KY 2151 (New Concord Church Road). Here, it heads to the northeast. It passes Allcock Cemetery before it intersects the northern terminus of KY 945. KY 339 turns to the north and enters Melber. There, it intersects KY 1820 (County Line Road) on the McCracken County line.

=== McCracken County ===
KY 339 curves to the north-northeast and crosses over Mayfield Creek. It curves to the north-northwest and intersects the southern terminus of KY 786 (Mayfield–Metropolis Road). Here, KY 339 curves back to the north-northeast and intersects the eastern terminus of KY 1438 (New Hope Church Road). It then crosses over Massac Creek and enters Massac. On the Massac–Hendron line, it meets its northern terminus, a second intersection with US 45 (Lone Oak Road).

== Major intersections ==
Massac–Hendron line, it meets its northern terminus, a second intersection with US 45 (Lone Oak Road).

County	Location	mi	km	Destinations	Notes
Graves		0.000	0.000	KY 564	Southern terminus
Graves		4.501	7.244	KY 97 south	Southern end of KY 97 concurrency
Graves	Sedalia	4.501	7.244	KY 97 north / KY 381 south	Northern end of KY 97 concurrency; northern terminus of KY 381
Graves		6.036	9.714	KY 303 – Cuba, Mayfield	
Graves	Stubblefield	8.692	13.988	KY 1748 north	Southern terminus of KY 2781
Graves		9.148	14.722	KY 129 south	Northern terminus of KY 129
Graves	Wingo	12.334	19.850	US 45 south – Fulton	Southern end of US 45 concurrency
Graves	Wingo	12.334	19.850	US 45 north – Mayfield	Northern end of US 45 concurrency
Graves	Wingo	13.187	21.222	I-69 – Fulton, Mayfield	I-69 exit 14
Graves	Hollifield	15.481	24.914	KY 58 east – Mayfield	Southern end of KY 58 concurrency
Graves	Hollifield	15.481	24.914	KY 58 west – Clinton	Northern end of KY 58 concurrency
Graves		20.120	32.380	KY 384 east / KY 1748 south	Western terminus of KY 384; southern end of KY 1748 concurrency
Graves		22.035	35.462	KY 1748 north	Northern end of KY 1748 concurrency
Graves		24.311	39.125	KY 1686 west	Eastern terminus of KY 1686
Graves	Fancy Farm	26.487	42.627	KY 80 east	Southern end of KY 80 concurrency
Graves	Fancy Farm	26.487	42.627	KY 80 west	Northern end of KY 80 concurrency
Graves		27.433	44.149	KY 1213 east	Western terminus of KY 1213
Graves		28.737	46.248	KY 121 – Mayfield, Wickliffe	
Graves		30.498	49.082	KY 408 west	Southern end of KY 408 concurrency
Graves		30.535	49.141	KY 408 east	Northern end of KY 408 concurrency
Graves	Lowes	32.661	52.563	KY 2588 east (School Street)	Western terminus of KY 2588
Graves	Lowes	32.744	52.696	KY 440 south	Northern terminus of KY 440
Graves	Lowes	32.913	52.968	KY 849 west	Southern end of KY 849 concurrency
Graves	Lowes	32.980	53.076	KY 849 east	Northern end of KY 849 concurrency
Graves		36.013	57.957	KY 2151 north (New Concord Church Road)	Southern terminus of KY 2151
Graves		38.007	61.166	KY 945 south – Kansas	Northern terminus of KY 945
Graves–McCracken county line	Melber	38.361	61.736	KY 1820 (County Line Road) to US 45 / US 62	
McCracken		40.449	65.096	KY 786 north (Mayfield–Metropolis Road)	Southern terminus of KY 786
McCracken		42.281	68.045	KY 1438 west (New Hope Church Road)	Eastern terminus of KY 1438
McCracken	Massac–Hendron line	45.513	73.246	US 45 (Lone Oak Road) – Mayfield, Paducah	Northern terminus
1.000 mi = 1.609 km; 1.000 km = 0.621 mi: Concurrency terminus
