= U.S. Route 45 in Kentucky =

U.S. Highway in Kentucky

U.S. Route 45

Route information
- Maintained by KYTC
- Length: 51.880 mi (83.493 km)

Major junctions
- South end: US 45 / SR 3 at Tennessee state line in Fulton
- US 45 Byp. in Mayfield; I-69 near Mayfield; I-24 in Paducah; US 62 / KY 731 in Paducah; US 60 in Paducah; US 45 Bus. in Paducah; I-24 BL / US 60 Bus. in Paducah
- North end: US 45 at Ohio River in Paducah

Location
- Country: United States
- State: Kentucky
- Counties: Fulton, Hickman, Graves, McCracken

Highway system
- United States Numbered Highway System; List; Special; Divided; Kentucky State Highway System; Interstate; US; State; Parkways
| ← KY 44 | → KY 46 |

U.S. Route 45 (US 45) enters Kentucky at Fulton in Fulton County and travels northeast through Hickman County, Graves County, and McCracken County. After passing through Mayfield in Graves County it heads directly north into Paducah as a four-lane highway. In Paducah, US 45 serves as a major artery, intersecting with Interstate 24 at Exit 7, and intersecting US 60 and 62. U.S. 45 leaves Kentucky from Paducah's northern border across the two-lane, metal-grate Brookport Bridge to Brookport, Illinois across the Ohio River.

== Route description ==
US 45 enters Kentucky at Fulton in Fulton County where it travels around the west side and then north side of town before entering Hickman County. It travels just to the south and east of I-69 as it passes briefly through Hickman County and into Graves County. In Graves County US 45 travels northeast and passes through the communities of Water Valley and Wingo. Roughly 7 miles (11 km) northeast of Wingo, US 45 passes through Mayfield where it forms an intersection with US 45 Bypass before passing through the heart of town. Just north of town, US 45 intersects US 45 Bypass and Purchase Parkway and becomes a four-lane divided highway as it turns toward the north. US 45 continues northward through rural sections of Graves County and into McCracken County. The previous routing between these two points is now designated Kentucky Route 1241. In McCracken County, US 45 passes through Lone Oak and then passes under I-24 as it enters Paducah. In Paducah, US 45 forms intersections with US 60, US 62, US 60 Business, I-24 Business, and US 45 Business as it passes through the western part of town. US 45 crosses the Ohio River via the Brookport Bridge into Illinois 51.880 miles (83.493 km) from the Tennessee state line.

== History ==
US 45 was signed in Kentucky by 1928, although it was not yet paved. The entire route in Kentucky was paved by 1939.

== Major intersections ==
| County | Location | mi | km | Destinations | Notes |
|---|---|---|---|---|---|
| Fulton | Fulton | 0.000 | 0.000 | US 45 south / KY 116 east (Highland Drive) | Continuation into Tennessee |
| Fulton | Fulton | 0.000 | 0.000 | KY 116 west (State Line Street) | North end of KY 116 overlap (southbound only); Kentucky–Tennessee line |
| Fulton | Fulton | 0.065 | 0.105 | KY 1648 north (Second Street) | |
| Fulton | Fulton | 0.579 | 0.932 | Redbud Lane (KY 1644 north) | |
| Fulton | Fulton | 0.579 | 0.932 | KY 1648 to I-69 / US 51 – Clinton | |
| Fulton | Fulton | 1.345 | 2.165 | KY 1718 north (Fairview Avenue) – Business District | |
| Fulton | Fulton | 1.790 | 2.881 | KY 307 south (M.L. King Jr. Drive) – Business District | South end of KY 307 overlap |
| Fulton | Fulton | 1.845 | 2.969 | KY 307 north to I-69 / US 51 | North end of KY 307 overlap |
| Hickman | | 3.439 | 5.535 | KY 1218 | |
| Hickman | | 3.846 | 6.190 | KY 2569 | |
| Hickman | | 5.162 | 8.307 | KY 94 west | South end of KY 94 overlap |
| Graves | Water Valley | 6.670 | 10.734 | KY 94 east / KY 1529 west – Murray | North end of KY 94 overlap |
| Graves | Water Valley | 7.012 | 11.285 | KY 1283 north | |
| Graves | Water Valley | 7.118 | 11.455 | To KY 2422 / Hubbard Street (KY 1839) – Camp Beauregard | |
| Graves | | 13.122 | 21.118 | KY 944 west | |
| Graves | Wingo | 13.668 | 21.997 | KY 1806 north (Whitnell Drive) | |
| Graves | Wingo | 13.963 | 22.471 | KY 339 south – Sedalia, Business District | South end of KY 339 overlap |
| Graves | Wingo | 14.043 | 22.600 | KY 339 north to I-69 – Clinton | North end of KY 339 overlap |
| Graves | | 16.916 | 27.224 | KY 58 west – Clinton | South end of KY 58 overlap |
| Graves | Pryorsburg | 17.572 | 28.279 | KY 1748 | |
| Graves | | 21.184 | 34.092 | US 45 Byp. north to I-69 – Paducah | Interchange |
| Graves | Mayfield | 23.719 | 38.172 | KY 58 east / KY 80 Bus. west (Broadway) | North end of KY 58 overlap |
| Graves | Mayfield | 24.697 | 39.746 | KY 121 – Wickliffe, Cairo, Murray | |
| Graves | Mayfield | 24.833 | 39.965 | KY 3141 east (Crittendon Lane) | |
| Graves | | 25.563 | 41.140 | I-69 / US 45 Byp. south – Fulton, Benton | I-69 exit 25 |
| Graves | | 25.833 | 41.574 | KY 1830 west | |
| Graves | | 27.055 | 43.541 | KY 1276 west (Key Bottom Road) | |
| Graves | | 27.289 | 43.917 | KY 1241 north | |
| Graves | Hickory | 29.082 | 46.803 | Powell Road (KY 3043 west) | |
| Graves | | 30.743 | 49.476 | KY 2194 (Doyle Road) | |
| Graves | | 31.861 | 51.275 | KY 408 – Viola | |
| Graves | | 33.475 | 53.873 | KY 849 – Lowes, Folsomdale | |
| Graves | | 34.427 | 55.405 | KY 1241 | |
| McCracken | | 38.347 | 61.714 | KY 1241 – Melber | |
| McCracken | | 40.672 | 65.455 | KY 1288 east (Lebanon Church Road) | |
| McCracken | | 41.695 | 67.102 | KY 999 east (Krebs Station Road) | |
| McCracken | | 43.865 | 70.594 | KY 1241 south | |
| McCracken | | 44.215 | 71.157 | KY 339 south (Clinton Road) – Melber | |
| McCracken | Lone Oak | 44.413 | 71.476 | KY 1322 west (Lovelaceville Road) | |
| McCracken | Lone Oak | 44.779 | 72.065 | KY 1286 (Friendship Road) | |
| McCracken | | 45.447 | 73.140 | KY 3074 east (Bleich Road) | |
| McCracken | Paducah | 46.098 | 74.188 | I-24 to US 62 – St. Louis, Nashville | I-24 exit 7 |
| McCracken | Paducah | 46.976 | 75.601 | KY 1310 east (Berger Road) | |
| McCracken | Paducah | 47.304 | 76.128 | US 62 west (Alben Barkley Drive) / KY 731 north (Lone Oak Road) to I-24 west – Bardwell, Wickliffe | South end of US 62 overlap |
| McCracken | Paducah | 47.950 | 77.168 | US 60 east / US 62 east (Jackson Street) | North end of US 62 overlap; south end of US 60 overlap |
| McCracken | Paducah | 48.197 | 77.566 | US 45 Bus. north (Washington Street) | |
| McCracken | Paducah | 48.886 | 78.674 | US 60 west (Joe Clifton Drive) – Barkley Airport | North end of US 60 overlap |
| McCracken | Paducah | 49.132 | 79.070 | I-24 BL / US 60 Bus. (Park Avenue) – Barkley Airport | |
| McCracken | Paducah | 49.796 | 80.139 | KY 305 (Cairo Road) | |
| McCracken | Paducah | 50.186 | 80.767 | US 45 Bus. south (Eighth Street) | |
| Ohio River | | 51.880 | 83.493 | Brookport Bridge; Kentucky–Illinois line | |
| Ohio River | | 51.880 | 83.493 | US 45 north – Brookport | Continuation into Illinois |
1.000 mi = 1.609 km; 1.000 km = 0.621 mi: Concurrency terminus

== Special routes ==
=== Mayfield bypass ===
U.S. Route 45 Bypass
- Location: Mayfield, Kentucky
- Length: 3.818 mi (6.144 km)

US 45 Bypass in Mayfield begins at a junction with US 45 on the southwest side of Mayfield and forms a concurrency with I-69 at exit 21 0.958 miles (1.542 km) north of US 45. It carries this concurrency for 2.860 miles (4.603 km) and ends at a junction with US 45 at exit 25 of the parkway north of Mayfield. Since the former Purchase Parkway has been re-designated I-69, US 45 Bypass signs have been removed from the I-69 concurrency, and the north interchange with US 45.

The entire route is in Graves County.

| Location | mi | km | Exit | Destinations | Notes |
|---|---|---|---|---|---|
| | 0.000 | 0.000 | | US 45 / KY 80 east – Mayfield, Fulton | Partial interchange; southern terminus; south end of KY 80 concurrency |
| Mayfield | | | 21 | I-69 south – Fulton | South end of I-69 overlap; I-69 Exit 21 |
| Mayfield | 1.338 | 2.153 | 22 | KY 80 west / KY 80 Bus. east – Fancy Farm, Mayfield | North end of KY 80 concurrency; western terminus of KY 80 Business |
| Mayfield | 2.794 | 4.497 | 24 | KY 121 – Wickliffe, Mayfield | |
| | 3.818 | 6.144 | | I-69 north / US 45 – Benton, Mayfield | Northern terminus; north end of I-69 overlap; I-69 exit 25 |
1.000 mi = 1.609 km; 1.000 km = 0.621 mi: Concurrency terminus

=== Paducah business route ===
U.S. Route 45 Business
- Location: Paducah, Kentucky
- Length: 4.378 mi (7.046 km)

US 45 Business in Paducah begins at an intersection with US 45 in downtown Paducah and travels northeast through town. As it nears the Ohio River, it turns to the northwest and ends at a junction with US 45 south of the Brookport Bridge over the Ohio River 4.378 miles (7.046 km) from its origin.

The entire route is in Paducah, McCracken County.

| mi | km | Destinations | Notes |
|---|---|---|---|
| 0.000 | 0.000 | US 45 | Southern terminus |
| 2.039 | 3.281 | US 60 Bus. | South end of US 60 Business overlap |
| 2.119 | 3.410 | KY 3238 (Kentucky Avenue) | |
| 2.188 | 3.521 | KY 3238 (Broadway Street) | |
| 2.946 | 4.741 | US 60 Bus. | North end of US 60 Business overlap |
| 4.378 | 7.046 | US 45 | Northern terminus |
1.000 mi = 1.609 km; 1.000 km = 0.621 mi: Concurrency terminus

U.S. Route 45
| Previous state: Tennessee | Kentucky | Next state: Illinois |
