= Purchase Parkway =

Former freeway designation in Kentucky

Purchase Parkway
- Julian M. Carroll Purchase Parkway
- Purchase Parkway highlighted in red

Route information
- Maintained by KYTC
- Length: 52.333 mi (84.222 km)
- Existed: 1966–December 2024

Major junctions
- South end: Future I-69 / US 51 in Fulton at the Tennessee state line
- US 51 in Fulton; US 45 in Mayfield; US 68 north of Benton; I-24 / I-69 near Calvert City
- North end: US 62 / KY 1523 near Calvert City

Location
- Country: United States
- State: Kentucky
- Counties: Fulton, Hickman, Graves, Marshall

Highway system
- Kentucky State Highway System; Interstate; US; State; Parkways

The Julian M. Carroll Purchase Parkway was the designation for a 52.3-mile (84.2 km) freeway in the U.S. state of Kentucky that ran between the Tennessee state line at Fulton and US 62 in Calvert City. It began concurrent with U.S. Route 51 (US 51) only a few yards from an intersection with US 45W, US 45E, and US 45 at its southern terminus. It was one of seven highways that are part of the Kentucky Parkway System. The parkway was upgraded to Interstate Highway standards and incorporated into I-69 in two phases. The northern half between US 45 Bypass in Mayfield and I-24 near Calvert City was redesignated as I-69 in July 2018. The interchange with I-24 was reconstructed from a basic cloverleaf interchange to include a pair of direct high-speed connectors for I-69 through traffic continuing east concurrent with I-24, with the northernmost 1.67 miles (2.69 km) of the parkway becoming exit 51A-B (unsigned KY 2602) and facilitating access to westbound I-24 and US 62 for northbound traffic. The Kentucky Transportation Cabinet (KYTC) acquired and closed the nearby Kentucky Lake Motor Speedway in 2015 via eminent domain for the reconstruction of the interchange. The southern half of the parkway from the Tennessee state line in Fulton to US 45 Bypass in Mayfield was redesignated as I-69 in December 2024.

== History ==
The Purchase Parkway formerly used a light blue shield.

Federal legislation designated the entire length of the Purchase Parkway as I-69 in 2002. On June 6, 2008, President George W. Bush signed HR 1195 (SAFETEA-LU Technical Corrections Act of 2008), reaffirming the I-69 designation for the Purchase Parkway and further authorizing Kentucky to sign the route as such with Federal Highway Administration (FHWA) approval. The Kentucky Transportation Cabinet had planned I-69 signs on the parkway during the summer of 2008, but the FHWA required the KYTC to either upgrade substandard portions of the route or obtain a design waiver before the parkway could be signed as I-69.

On July 6, 2018, a 30-mile segment of the parkway was re-designated as Interstate 69, and the parkway was truncated to exit 21 in Mayfield The northernmost stub of the Purchase Parkway between I-24/I-69 and US-62 (now unsigned KY 2602) is now signed as "TO US-62" in the northbound direction and "TO I-24/I-69" in the southbound direction.

Originally named Purchase Parkway for the Jackson Purchase area it diagonally traverses, the road was renamed for Julian Carroll, a former Kentucky governor from McCracken County, in 2001. The Purchase Parkway carried the unsigned designation of Kentucky Route 9003 (JC 9003). The Mayfield Bypass, which was incorporated into the parkway following its construction, is also signed as US 45 Bypass.

=== Transition to Interstate 69 ===
The Julian M. Carroll Purchase Parkway from the junction with Interstate 24 west was legally designated to become part of I-69. On May 15, 2006, Governor Ernie Fletcher announced that the Purchase Parkway would become part of the alignment of I-69 in Kentucky, along with parts of I-24, the Edward T. Breathitt Pennyrile Parkway, and the Wendell H. Ford Western Kentucky Parkway. To reflect this, Future I-69 shields were erected along the parkway in the middle of 2006. Additional federal legislation enacted in 2008 confirmed the route of I-69, and authorized Kentucky to immediately begin signing the Purchase Parkway (and parts of the Western Kentucky Parkway and Pennyrile Parkway) as I-69, even though the parkways did not yet meet Interstate Highway standards.

The reason the 2008 legislation (HR 1195) immediately applied the I-69 designation to the Purchase Parkway was to tap into federal Interstate Highway money to fund upgrades to the parkway. This is because Interstate Highway funds typically could not be used to upgrade an existing freeway until it is designated and signed as an Interstate. Median improvements near Mayfield, increased bridge heights to 16 feet (4.9 m), shoulder improvements, and interchange reconstructions will all need to take place to bring the alignment into federal compliance. No official funding has been set in the six-year plan stipulating modernization of the parkways that will be affected by I-69's routing, nor has any official study been completed.

=== As a toll road ===
Except for the Mayfield bypass, which remained free, the parkway was originally a toll road, as were all Kentucky parkways. State law requires that toll collection cease when enough tolls are collected to pay off the parkway's construction bonds; which in the case of the Purchase, occurred in 1992.

==== Toll locations and charges (1988) ====
Exit	Location	Through cars charge	Enter (N) or Exit (S)	Enter (S) or Exit (N)
14	Wingo (at KY 339)	40 cents	20 cents	20 cents
43	Benton (at KY 348)	50 cents	20 cents	30 cents

== Exit list ==
County	Location	mi	km	Exit	Destinations	Notes
Fulton	Fulton	0.000	0.000		Future I-69 south / US 51 south	Continuation into Tennessee; south end of US 51 concurrency
Fulton	Fulton	0.030	0.048	0	To KY 116 / KY 166 – Weigh Station, Fulton, Hickman	Fulton / Hickman not signed northbound, KY 116 / Weigh Station not signed southbound
Fulton	Fulton	1.424	2.292	1	US 51 north – Clinton, Fulton	North end of US 51 concurrency
Fulton	Fulton	2.478	3.988	2	KY 307 – Fulton	
Graves	Wingo	13.645	21.959	14	KY 339 – Wingo, Clinton	Converted to a diamond interchange in 2023
Graves	Mayfield	21.256	34.208	21	US 45 Byp. south	South end of US 45 Bypass concurrency
Graves	Mayfield	22.239	35.790	22	KY 80 – Fancy Farm, Mayfield	
Graves	Mayfield	23.701	38.143	24	KY 121 – Wickliffe, Mayfield	
Graves	Mayfield	24.713	39.772	25	US 45 / US 45 Byp. ends – Paducah, Mayfield	North end of US 45 Bypass concurrency
Graves	Mayfield	27.452	44.180	27	KY 131 – Airport	
Marshall	Benton	40.805	65.669	41	US 641 Spur south – Hardin, Murray	
Marshall	Benton	42.568	68.507	43	KY 348 – Benton, Symsonia	
Marshall	Draffenville	46.953	75.564	47	US 68 – Kenlake State Park, Kentucky Lake Recreation Area	
Marshall	Calvert City	51.394	82.711	52A	I-24 east / I-69 north – Nashville	Northern end of I-69 overlap; I-24 exit 25A
Marshall	Calvert City	51.394	82.711	52B	I-24 west – Paducah	I-24 exit 25B
Marshall	Calvert City	52.333	84.222		KY 1523 north (Oak Park Boulevard) / US 62 – Calvert City, Paducah, Eddyville	At-grade intersection; northern terminus; road continues east as KY 1523 (Oak Park Blvd.)
1.000 mi = 1.609 km; 1.000 km = 0.621 mi: Concurrency terminus
