= Richard Heath =

American politician

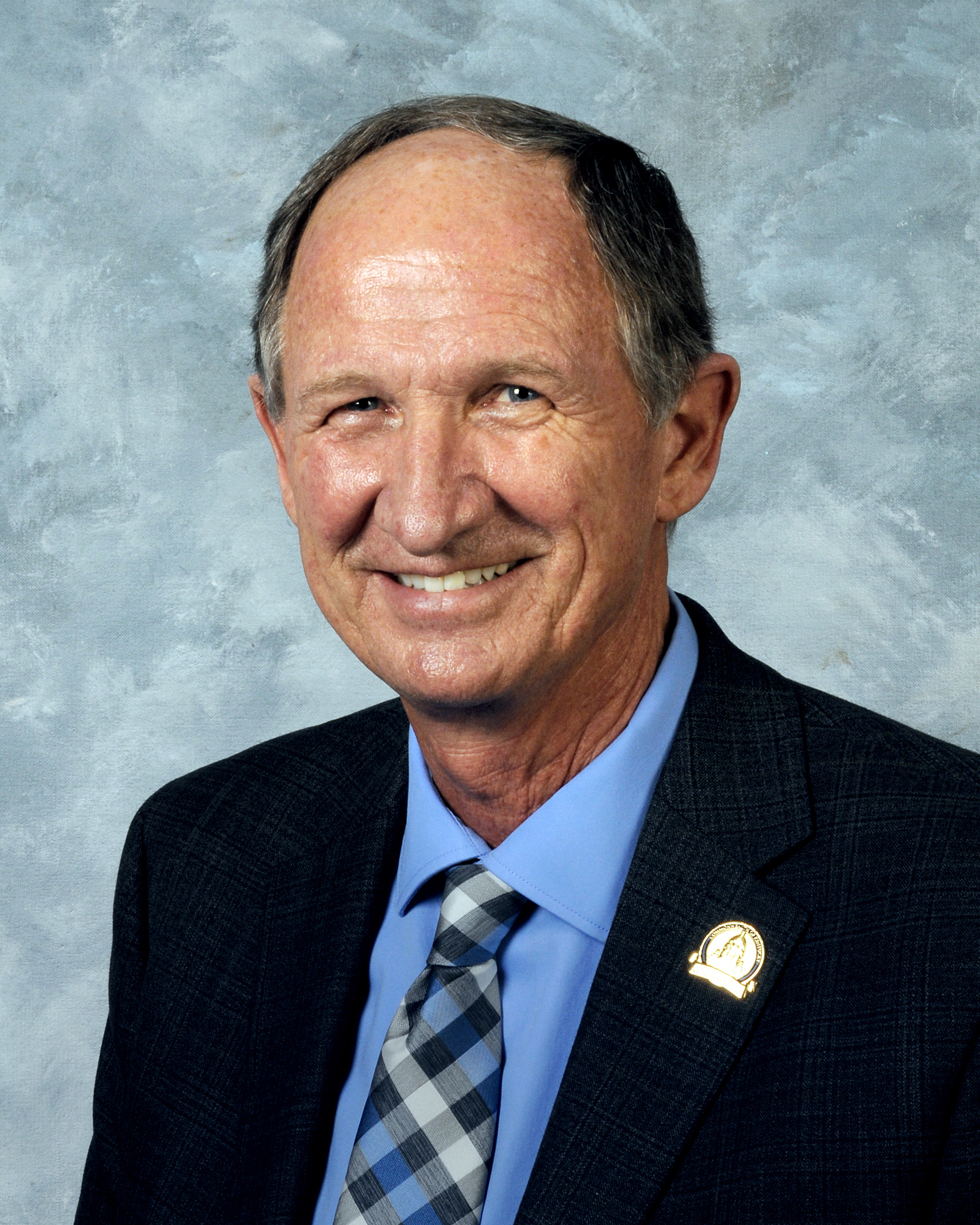

Member of the Kentucky House of Representatives from the 2nd district
- In office November 2012 – January 1, 2025
- Preceded by: Fred Nesler
- Succeeded by: Kim Holloway

Personal details
- Born: August 9, 1955 (age 70)
- Party: Republican
- Education: Murray State University (BS, MA)
- Committees: Agriculture (Chair); Small Business and Information Technology; State Government

Richard Gale Heath (born August 9, 1955) is an American politician who served as a Republican member of the Kentucky House of Representatives from 2012 to 2025. He represented Kentucky's 2nd House district, which included Graves County and part of McCracken County.

== Background ==
Heath graduated from Cuba High School in 1973. He went on to earn a Bachelor of Science in agricultural education in 1984, and a Master of Arts in agriculture in 1989, both from Murray State University.

Heath is the owner of Heath Building Materials, located in Mayfield, Kentucky. He identifies as a Baptist, and is currently a member of the Graves County Chamber of Commerce, Graves County Rotary Club, National Rifle Association of America (NRA), Associated General Contractors of America, National Frame Building Association, and Home Builders Association.

== Elections ==
- 2012 On May 31, 2012, Kentucky's 2nd House district incumbent Fred Nesler resigned to accept a position with the Kentucky Department of Agriculture. Subsequently, Governor Steve Beshear called for a special election to be held on November 6, 2012, the same day as the general election. Heath won the 2012 Republican Primary with 752 votes (78.6%) and won the November 6, 2012 General election with 9,681 votes (54.8%) against Democratic nominee Kelly Whitaker. He also won the special election for the remaining two months of Nesler's term.
- 2014 Heath was unopposed in the 2014 republican primary, and won the 2014 general election with 9,181 votes against Democratic candidate Jesse Wright.
- 2015 Heath was defeated by Ryan Quarles in the 2015 republican primary for Kentucky Commissioner of Agriculture by a margin of 1,427 votes.
- 2016 Heath was unopposed in the 2016 republican primary, and won the 2016 general election with 11,699 votes against Democratic candidate Jesse Wright.
- 2018 Heath was unopposed in the 2018 republican primary, and won the 2018 general election with 10,880 votes against Democratic candidate Charlotte Goddard.
- 2020 Heath was unopposed in the 2020 republican primary, and won the 2020 general election with 15,484 votes against Libertarian candidate Joshua Gilpin.
- 2022 Heath was challenged in the 2022 republican primary by Kim Holloway, however Holloway was disqualified from the ballot due to one of her signatories for her campaign filing not being a registered republican. Holloway chose to continue her campaign as a write-in candidate during the 2022 general election, which Heath would win with 10,922 votes.
- 2023 Heath was defeated by Jonathan Shell in the 2023 republican primary for Kentucky Commissioner of Agriculture by a margin of 33,802 votes.
- 2024 Heath was defeated in the 2024 Republican primary, garnering 1,743 votes (47.8%) against Kim Holloway.
- 2026 Heath unsuccessfully ran to regain his seat, losing again to Holloway.
