= New Concord =

New Concord may refer to:

- New Concord, Kentucky
- New Concord, Ohio

== See also ==
- New Concorde, an American film distributor
- Concord (disambiguation)
