= Kentucky Route 97 =

State highway in Kentucky, United States

Kentucky Route 97
- KY 97 highlighted in red

Route information
- Maintained by KYTC
- Length: 18.262 mi (29.390 km)

Major junctions
- South end: SR 69 / State Line Road West at Kentucky-Tennessee state line
- North end: KY 80 / KY 121 / KY 121 Bus. near Mayfield

Location
- Country: United States
- State: Kentucky
- Counties: Graves

Highway system
- Kentucky State Highway System; Interstate; US; State; Parkways
← KY 96	→ KY 98

Kentucky Route 97 (KY 97) is a 18.262-mile-long (29.390 km) state highway in Graves County, Kentucky that runs from Tennessee State Route 69 (SR 69) and State Line Road West on the Kentucky-Tennessee state border southeast of Sedalia to KY 80, KY 121, and KY 121 Business just southeast of Mayfield.

== Route description ==
KY 97 enters Kentucky on the Graves-Calloway County line and travels north for a few tenths of a mile before curving toward the northwest away from the Calloway County line. It continues to the northwest through rural sections of southeastern Graves County, passing through the unincorporated community of Bell City. Nearly 7 miles (11 km) from the Tennessee state line, KY 97 forms a junction with KY 94 and continues toward the northwest passing through Sedalia and forming a junction with KY 339/KY 381. After passing through Sedalia the route travels due north for nearly 5.5 miles (8.9 km) and terminates at a junction with KY 80/KY 121/KY 121 Business just south of Mayfield. The route remains two lanes for its entirety and passes through mostly rural sections of Graves County.

== History ==
By 1937, KY 97 was a mostly unpaved road that terminated in the center of Mayfield. By 1989, KY 97 ended at its current northern terminus at a junction with KY 121 just south of Mayfield.

== Major intersections ==
The entire route is in Graves County.

Location	mi	km	Destinations	Notes
	0.000	0.000	SR 69 south	Southern terminus; continues as SR 69 in Tennessee
	0.688	1.107	KY 1270 east (Edgehill Trail) / Alderdice Road	Western terminus of KY 1270
	2.725	4.385	KY 1485 south (Bellville Road) / Protemus Hill Road	Northern terminus of KY 1485
	6.850	11.024	KY 94	
	12.268	19.743	KY 339 south	South end of KY 339 overlap
Sedalia	12.676	20.400	KY 339 south / KY 381 north	North end of KY 339 overlap; northern terminus of KY 381 overlap
	15.536	25.003	KY 1890	
	18.262	29.390	KY 80 / KY 121 / KY 121 Bus. north	Northern terminus; southern terminus of KY 121 Bus.
1.000 mi = 1.609 km; 1.000 km = 0.621 mi
