= Kentucky Route 303 =

State highway in Kentucky, United States

Kentucky Route 303
- KY 303 highlighted in red

Route information
- Maintained by KYTC
- Length: 16.9 mi (27.2 km)

Major junctions
- South end: Foyshack Road at the Tennessee state line southeast of Pilot Oak
- KY 385 southeast of Pilot Oak; KY 94 near Cuba; KY 83 / KY 2422 in Cuba; KY 80 in Mayfield
- North end: KY 121 Bus. in Mayfield

Location
- Country: United States
- State: Kentucky
- Counties: Graves

Highway system
- Kentucky State Highway System; Interstate; US; State; Parkways
| ← KY 302 | → KY 304 |

Kentucky Route 303 (KY 303) is a 16.9-mile-long (27.2 km) state highway in the U.S. state of Kentucky. The highway connects mostly rural areas of Graves County with the Tennessee state line and Mayfield.

== Route description ==
KY 303 begins at the Tennessee state line, at an intersection with Foyshack Road, southeast of Pilot Oak, within Graves County. It travels to the north-northeast and intersects the southern terminus of KY 385. It curves to the east and then to the north-northeast. The highway then curves to the east-southeast and then to a due north direction. It has an intersection with KY 94. Right after it crosses Obion Creek, it enters Cuba. Here, the highway has an intersection with both the eastern terminus of KY 2422 and the western terminus of KY 83. KY 303 continues to the north and intersects KY 339 and then crosses over Ford Creek. The highway intersects the western terminus of KY 1890 just before it crosses over Perry Creek. It travels through South Highland. It crosses over Torian Creek and then enters Mayfield. It intersects the western terminus of KY 80 and crosses over Kess Creek before passing Highland Park Cemetery. The highway continues to the north and meets its northern terminus, an intersection with KY 121 Bus. (Paris Road). Here, the roadway continues as South 3rd Street.

== Major intersections ==
The entire route is in Graves County.

| Location | mi | km | Destinations | Notes |
|---|---|---|---|---|
| Tennessee state line | 0.0 | 0.0 | Foyshack Road | Southern terminus |
| | 0.5 | 0.80 | KY 385 north | Southern terminus of KY 385 |
| | 5.1 | 8.2 | KY 94 | |
| Cuba | 6.9 | 11.1 | KY 83 east / KY 2422 west | Western terminus of KY 83; eastern terminus of KY 2422 |
| | 10.8 | 17.4 | KY 339 | |
| | 13.3 | 21.4 | KY 1890 east | Western terminus of KY 1890 |
| Mayfield | 15.9 | 25.6 | KY 80 east | Western terminus of KY 80 |
| Mayfield | 16.9 | 27.2 | KY 121 Bus. (Paris Road) | Northern terminus |
1.000 mi = 1.609 km; 1.000 km = 0.621 mi
