= Barkley Regional Airport =

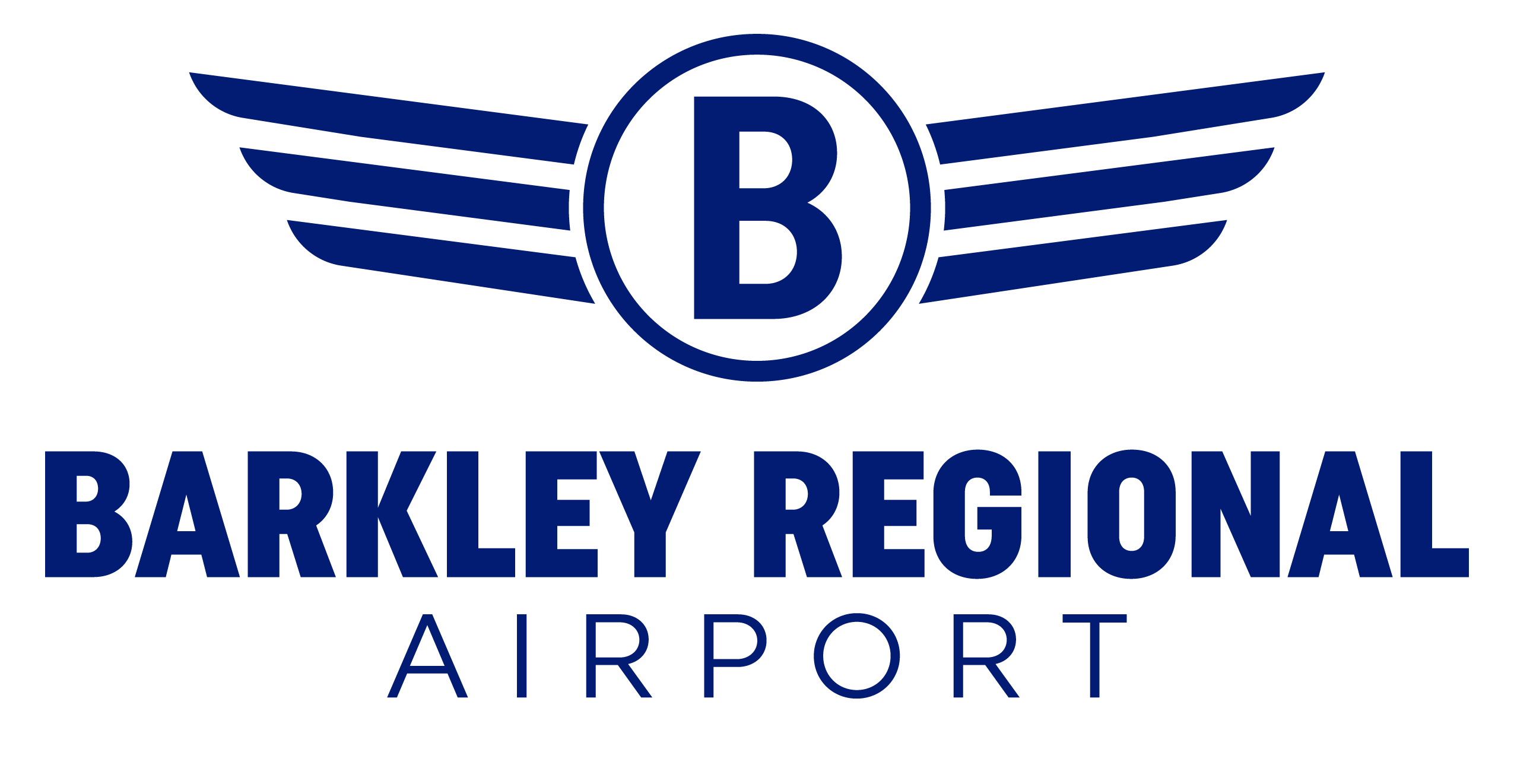

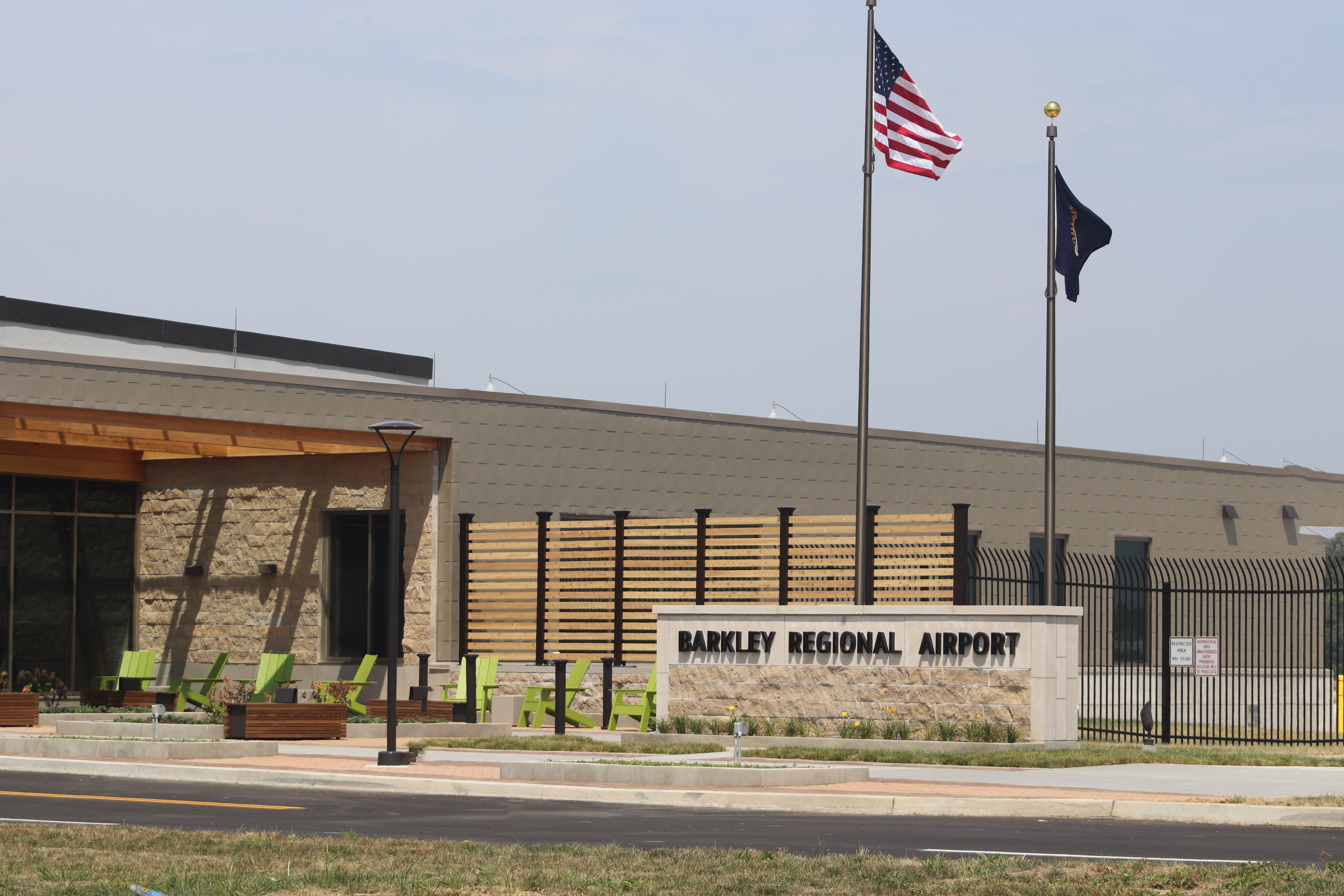
- New terminal at Barkley Regional Airport, 2023
- IATA: PAH; ICAO: KPAH; FAA LID: PAH

Summary
- Airport type: Public
- Owner: Barkley Regional Airport Authority
- Serves: Jackson Purchase Region
- Elevation AMSL: 410 ft (120 m)
- Coordinates: 37°03′37″N 088°46′23″W
- Website: FlyBarkley.com

Map
- Location within Kentucky Location within the United States

Runways
Direction	Length		Surface
Direction	ft	m	Surface
5/23	6,500	1,981	Asphalt
14/32	5,499	1,676	Asphalt

Statistics
- Aircraft operations (2018): 23,537
- Based aircraft (2018): 40
- Total passengers served (2016): 40,770
- Source: Federal Aviation Administration

Barkley Regional Airport (IATA: PAH, ICAO: KPAH, FAA LID: PAH) is an American domestic airport in West Paducah, Kentucky, 14 miles west of Paducah in McCracken County. It is used for general aviation and sees one airline, subsidized by the Essential Air Service program.

The only airline is Skywest Airlines, with Canadair CRJ200 flights for United Express to O'Hare International Airport in Chicago and George Bush Intercontinental Airport in Houston. A new $43M terminal building opened in June 2023, roughly 70 years after the original terminal was built in 1953.

The Federal Aviation Administration (FAA) National Plan of Integrated Airport Systems for 2023-2027 categorized it as a non-hub primary commercial service facility.

Federal Aviation Administration records say Barkley Regional had 13,643 passenger boardings (enplanements) in calendar year 2021 and 14,677 in 2022.

== History ==
Barkley Regional Airport is named after former Vice President of the United States Alben W. Barkley, who was from western Kentucky. The airport was previously served by Northwest Airlink (operated by Mesaba Airlines) Saab 340 regional turboprops with service to Memphis International Airport. When Northwest Airlines merged with Delta Air Lines, service to Memphis from Paducah was discontinued. New airline service began when Chicago-based United Airlines started daily Canadair CRJ200 regional jets nonstop to Chicago O'Hare International Airport with this service operated by SkyWest Airlines flying as United Express on behalf of United. Service began in the winter of 2010. This service was replaced by Contour Airlines on December 6, 2022, with nonstop flights to Charlotte, NC, using Embraer 145 regional jets, this service ended Feb 2026. Skywest began daily Canadair CRJ200 flights for United Express on Feb 23, 2026, connecting to O'Hare International Airport in Chicago and George Bush Intercontinental Airport in Houston through Essential Air Service subsidies.

Originally built as a military airfield in 1941, thanks to the efforts of then Senator Alben Barkley, the airfield was originally used to facilitate U.S. Army Air Corps B-17 bomber crew training which was taking place at nearby Dyersburg, TN. In 1945 the U.S. government deeded the land to the city of Paducah and McCracken County, making it available for civilian use.

On April 1, 1946, a Chicago and Southern Air Lines (C&S Air Lines) Douglas DC-3 was the first airline flight out of Paducah and the airport has had scheduled airline flights ever since. Chicago and Southern was then acquired by Delta Air Lines which in turn continued to serve Paducah. Ozark Airlines arrived in 1951. According to the Official Airline Guide (OAG), two airlines were serving Paducah in 1976: Delta with McDonnell Douglas DC-9-30 jets nonstop from Evansville and Memphis as well as direct, no change of plane DC-9-30 jet flights from Atlanta, Birmingham, AL, Boston, Chicago O'Hare Airport, Indianapolis and Philadelphia, and Ozark with nonstop McDonnell Douglas DC-9-30 jet and/or Fairchild FH-227B turboprop flights from Clarksville, TN, Louisville, Nashville and St. Louis as well as direct, no change of plane DC-9-30 jet flights from Chicago O'Hare Airport, Columbia, MO, Indianapolis, Kansas City and Milwaukee. Delta left in 1979 and Ozark pulled out in 1980.

Several commuter and regional air carriers operating turboprop aircraft served Paducah during the 1980s. In 1981 Air Illinois was operating nonstop service from Cape Girardeau, MO, Carbondale, IL, Memphis and St. Louis with larger Hawker Siddeley HS 748 regional aircraft as well as with smaller de Havilland Canada DHC-6 Twin Otter and Handley Page Jetstream commuter aircraft while Allegheny Commuter was flying on behalf of USAir nonstop from Louisville with Beechcraft commuter aircraft. In 1985 Allegheny Commuter had expanded its service on behalf of USAir with nonstops from Evansville, Louisville, Nashville, and Owensboro, KY with Beechcraft 99s while Britt Airways was flying nonstop from Cape Girardeau, Evansville, Memphis and St. Louis with Fairchild Swearingen Metroliner propjets. By 1989 three airlines were serving the airport: American Eagle operating on behalf of American Airlines with nonstop service from Nashville flown with Fairchild Swearingen Metroliners, Northwest Airlink flying on behalf of Northwest Airlines nonstop from Evansville and Memphis with British Aerospace BAe Jetstream 31 and Saab 340 aircraft, and Trans World Express operated by Air Midwest on behalf of Trans World Airlines (TWA) nonstop from Evansville and St. Louis flown with Fairchild Swearingen Metroliners and Saab 340 aircraft.

== Facilities ==
Barkley Regional Airport covers 1,018 acres (412 ha) at an elevation of 410 feet (125 m). It has two asphalt runways: 5/23 is 6,500 by 150 feet (1,981 x 46 m) and 14/32 is 5,499 by 150 feet (1,676 x 46 m). An expansion of runway 14/32 was completed in December 2005.

In 2015 the airport had 23,269 aircraft operations, average 63 per day: 80% general aviation, 8% military, 6% air taxi and 6% airline. In March 2017, 40 aircraft were based at the airport: 29 single-engine, 6 multi-engine, 4 jet and 1 helicopter.

Fixed-base operator Midwest Aviation provides charter services, flight training, aircraft maintenance, aircraft rental, avionics service, aircraft sales, and other aviation services.

== Airlines and destinations ==
United Express connects Barkley Airport to George Bush Intercontinental Airport (Houston) and O'Hare International Airport (Chicago).

== Statistics ==
Carrier shares (January 2023 – December 2023)
Carrier	Passengers (arriving and departing)
Contour	24,810(100%)

Top domestic destinations (January 2023 – December 2023)
Rank	Airport	Passengers	Airline
1	Charlotte	12,480	Contour

== Accidents and incidents ==
- September 30, 1991: A man was spotted falling from the wing of Northwest Airlink Flight 2940 bound for Memphis shortly after takeoff. He was later located deceased at the northern end of the airport with no identification. An airport worker recalled the man asking to trade his jacket for a flight out west. Later, the same employee, along with two other eye-witnesses, observed him scaling the airport's fence before running towards the Northwest aircraft sitting on the runway. The incident was covered in the September 16, 1992 episode of Unsolved Mysteries, which eventually led to the man being identified in 1999 as 28 year-old Brian Stanley Duecker of Cincinnati.

== See also ==
- List of airports in Kentucky

== Other sources ==
- Essential Air Service documents (Docket DOT-OST-2009-0160) from the U.S. Department of Transportation:
  - Ninety-day notice (July 15, 2009): from Mesaba Aviation, Inc. of its intent to discontinue unsubsidized scheduled air service at the following communities, effective October 12, 2009: Paducah, KY; Alpena, MI; Muskegon, MI; Hancock, MI; Sault Ste. Marie, MI; International Falls, MN; Tupelo, MS and Eau Claire, WI.
- Essential Air Service documents (Docket OST-2009-0299) from the U.S. Department of Transportation:
  - Memorandum (November 19, 2009): closing out docket DOT-2009-0160 and opening up eight new dockets for the various communities (Alpena, MI; Eau Claire, WI; Hancock/Houghton, MI; International Falls, MN; Muskegon, MI; Paducah, KY; Sault Ste. Marie, MI; Tupelo, MS).
  - Order 2009-10-8 (October 16, 2009): selecting SkyWest Airlines, Inc., d/b/a United Express, to provide subsidized essential air service (EAS) at Hancock/Houghton and Muskegon, Michigan, Paducah, Kentucky, and Eau Claire, Wisconsin.
  - Order 2012-1-24 (January 26, 2012): tentatively re-selecting SkyWest Airlines, Inc. to provide Essential Air Service (EAS) with subsidy rates as follows: Eau Claire, Wisconsin, $1,733,576; Hancock/Houghton, Michigan, $934,156; Muskegon, Michigan, $1,576,067; and Paducah, Kentucky, $1,710,775.
  - Order 2012-2-2 (February 1, 2012): makes final the selection of SkyWest Airlines, Inc., to provide Essential Air Service at Eau Claire, Wisconsin; Hancock/Houghton, Michigan; and Paducah, Kentucky (at Muskegon, the selection of SkyWest was not finalized at this time).
  - Order 2013-10-8 (October 21, 2013): reselecting Delta Air Lines, Inc., to provide Essential Air Service (EAS) at Pellston and Sault Ste. Marie, Michigan; and SkyWest Airlines, at Paducah, Kentucky; Hancock/Houghton, and Muskegon, Michigan; and Eau Claire, Wisconsin. The Order also tentatively reselects American Airlines, at Watertown, New York. Paducah, Kentucky: Docket 2009-0299; Effective Period: January 1, 2014, through January 31, 2016; Service: Fourteen (14) nonstop round trips per week to Chicago O'Hare (ORD); Aircraft Type: CRJ-200; Annual Subsidy: $2,034,160.
