= Hendron, Kentucky =

Census-designated place in Kentucky, United States

- Census-designated place
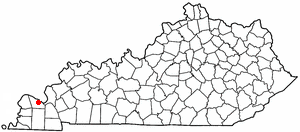
- Location in Kentucky
- Coordinates: 37°2′16″N 88°38′42″W
- Country: United States
- State: Kentucky
- County: McCracken

Area
  - Total: 5.37 sq mi (13.91 km^{2})
  - Land: 5.35 sq mi (13.85 km^{2})
  - Water: 0.023 sq mi (0.06 km^{2})
- Elevation: 367 ft (112 m)

Population (2020)
  - Total: 4,774
  - Density: 892.6/sq mi (344.63/km^{2})
- Time zone: UTC-6 (Central (CST))
  - Summer (DST): UTC-5 (CDT)
- ZIP code: 42003 (Paducah)
- Area codes: 270 & 364
- FIPS code: 21-35902
- GNIS feature ID: 0494048

Hendron is an unincorporated community and census-designated place (CDP) in McCracken County, Kentucky, United States. The population was 4,774 at the 2020 census. It is part of the Paducah, KY-IL Metropolitan Statistical Area.

== History ==
Hendron was named for the local Hendron family.

== Geography ==
Hendron is located at 37°2′16″N 88°38′42″W (37.037800, -88.644889) and borders the southern edge of the city of Paducah. The original community of Hendron is in the northeast part of the CDP at Old Mayfield Road, north of where it crosses Interstate 24. The Hendron CDP extends west as far as U.S. Route 45 and south as far as Yopp Lane, between South Friendship Road and Old Highway 45.

Hendron is bordered to the west by the CDP of Massac, and the unincorporated community of Lone Oak along US 45 is split between the two CDPs.

According to the United States Census Bureau, the Hendron CDP has a total area of 5.37 square miles (13.91 km^{2}), of which 0.02 square miles (0.05 km^{2}), or 0.41%, are water.

== Demographics ==
Historical population
Census	Pop.	Note	%±
1990	3,712		—
2000	4,239		14.2%
2010	4,687		10.6%
2020	4,774		1.9%
U.S. Decennial Census

=== 2020 census ===
As of the 2020 census, Hendron had a population of 4,774. The median age was 44.8 years. 20.9% of residents were under the age of 18 and 24.6% of residents were 65 years of age or older. For every 100 females there were 87.4 males, and for every 100 females age 18 and over there were 82.8 males age 18 and over.

97.9% of residents lived in urban areas, while 2.1% lived in rural areas.

There were 2,133 households in Hendron, of which 26.3% had children under the age of 18 living in them. Of all households, 45.3% were married-couple households, 18.8% were households with a male householder and no spouse or partner present, and 31.0% were households with a female householder and no spouse or partner present. About 35.7% of all households were made up of individuals and 21.4% had someone living alone who was 65 years of age or older.

There were 2,374 housing units, of which 10.2% were vacant. The homeowner vacancy rate was 2.5% and the rental vacancy rate was 11.8%.

Racial composition as of the 2020 census
Race	Number	Percent
White	4,121	86.3%
Black or African American	229	4.8%
American Indian and Alaska Native	8	0.2%
Asian	89	1.9%
Native Hawaiian and Other Pacific Islander	2	0.0%
Some other race	72	1.5%
Two or more races	253	5.3%
Hispanic or Latino (of any race)	161	3.4%

=== 2000 census ===
As of the census of 2000, there were 4,239 people, 1,832 households, and 1,278 families residing in the CDP. The population density was 816.7 inhabitants per square mile (315.3/km^{2}). There were 1,932 housing units at an average density of 372.2 units per square mile (143.7 units/km^{2}). The racial makeup of the CDP was 95.59% White, 2.24% African American, 0.26% Native American, 0.66% Asian, 0.42% from other races, and 0.83% from two or more races. Hispanic or Latino of any race were 1.25% of the population.

There were 1,832 households, out of which 28.5% had children under the age of 18 living with them, 56.6% were married couples living together, 9.4% had a female householder with no husband present, and 30.2% were non-families. 26.9% of all households were made up of individuals, and 9.6% had someone living alone who was 65 years of age or older. The average household size was 2.30 and the average family size was 2.76.

In the CDP, the population was spread out, with 21.5% under the age of 18, 7.7% from 18 to 24, 28.0% from 25 to 44, 26.6% from 45 to 64, and 16.2% who were 65 years of age or older. The median age was 41 years. For every 100 females, there were 91.3 males. For every 100 females age 18 and over, there were 87.1 males.

The median income for a household in the CDP was $40,858, and the median income for a family was $49,401. Males had a median income of $45,870 versus $24,884 for females. The per capita income for the CDP was $22,984. About 3.8% of families and 7.0% of the population were below the poverty line, including 9.6% of those under age 18 and 9.2% of those age 65 or over.

== Education ==
It is in the McCracken County Public Schools (MCPS) school district.

MCPS, the school district that serves all areas in McCracken County except for most of the City of Paducah, has its headquarters in Hendron.
