= Robbie Castleman =

American politician

Member of the Kentucky House of Representatives from the 2nd district
- In office August 1991 – January 1, 1993
- Preceded by: Dick Castleman
- Succeeded by: Fred Nesler

Personal details
- Born: February 27, 1929
- Died: August 9, 2009 (aged 80)
- Party: Democratic

Robbie N. Castleman (February 27, 1929 – August 9, 2009) was an American politician from Kentucky who was a member of the Kentucky House of Representatives from 1991 to 1993. Castleman was elected in an August 1991 special election following the death of her husband, incumbent representative Dick Castleman. She was defeated for renomination in 1992 by Fred Nesler.

Castleman died in August 2009.
