= Kentucky's 1st House of Representatives district =

American legislative district

Kentucky's 1st State House of Representatives district
Representative
Steven Rudy; R–Paducah
since January 1, 2005
- Registration: 46.8% Democratic; 44.1% Republican; 8.5% No party preference
- Demographics: 82.7% White; 10.4% Black; 2.9% Hispanic; 0.2% Asian; 0.1% Native American; 0.2% Hawaiian/Pacific Islander; 0.2% Other; 3.5% Multiracial
- Population (2023): 44,228
- Registered voters (2025): 37,408

Kentucky's 1st House of Representatives district is one of 100 districts in the Kentucky House of Representatives. Located in the far west of the state, it comprises the counties of Ballard, Crittenden, Fulton, Hickman, and part of McCracken. It has been represented by Steven Rudy (R–Paducah) since 2005. As of 2023, the district had a population of 44,228. In 2024, the median income for a household in the district was $61,830.

== Voter registration ==
On January 1, 2025, the district had 37,408 registered voters, who were registered with the following parties.

Party	Registration	
Party	Voters	%
Democratic	17,522	46.84
Republican	16,504	44.12
Independent	1,212	3.24
Libertarian	144	0.38
Green	24	0.06
Constitution	18	0.05
Reform	4	0.01
Socialist Workers	2	0.01
"Other"	1,978	5.29
Total	37,408	100.00
Source: Kentucky State Board of Elections

== List of members representing the district ==
=== 1894 – 1962 ===
Member	Party	Years	Counties
District created January 1, 1894
J. F. Rennick	Democratic	1894–1896	1894–1920; Fulton and Hickman
J. C. Speight	Democratic	1896–1898	1894–1920; Fulton and Hickman
A. C. Brown	Democratic	1898–1900	1894–1920; Fulton and Hickman
James L. Egbert	Democratic	1900–1902	1894–1920; Fulton and Hickman
Joshua Naylor	Democratic	1902–1904	1894–1920; Fulton and Hickman
Luby Hargrove	Democratic	1904–1906	1894–1920; Fulton and Hickman
W. J. Jackson	Democratic	1906–1910	1894–1920; Fulton and Hickman
Frank S. Moore	Democratic	1910–1912	1894–1920; Fulton and Hickman
W. J. Jackson	Democratic	1912–1914	1894–1920; Fulton and Hickman
Will L. Hampton	Democratic	1914–1916	1894–1920; Fulton and Hickman
Walter J. McMurray	Democratic	1916–1918	1894–1920; Fulton and Hickman
Oate Piper	Democratic	1918–1920	1894–1920; Fulton and Hickman
Lon Adams	Democratic	1920–1922	1920–1944; Fulton and Hickman
William T. Walker	Democratic	1922–1924	1920–1944; Fulton and Hickman
Walter J. McMurray	Democratic	1924–1926	1920–1944; Fulton and Hickman
Morman B. Daniels	Democratic	1926–1928	1920–1944; Fulton and Hickman
James D. Via	Democratic	1928–1934	1920–1944; Fulton and Hickman
Glenn W. Lane	Democratic	1934–1936	1920–1944; Fulton and Hickman
Will L. Hampton	Democratic	1936–1938	1920–1944; Fulton and Hickman
Harry Lee Waterfield	Democratic	1938–1948	1920–1944; Fulton and Hickman
Harry Lee Waterfield	Democratic	1938–1948	1944–1964; Fulton and Hickman
Harvey M. Pewitt	Democratic	1948–1950	1944–1964; Fulton and Hickman
Harry Lee Waterfield	Democratic	1950–1952	1944–1964; Fulton and Hickman
Jennings H. Kearby	Democratic	1952–1956	1944–1964; Fulton and Hickman
Huston Johnson	Democratic	1956–1960	1944–1964; Fulton and Hickman
Joe W. Treas	Democratic	1960–1962	1944–1964; Fulton and Hickman

=== 1962 – present ===
Member	Party	Years	Electoral history	District location
Hoyt Allen Barnett (Hickman)	Democratic	January 1, 1962 – August 30, 1962	Elected in 1961. Resigned to become a Department of Commerce liaison for western Kentucky.	1944–1964; Fulton and Hickman Counties.
Henry Maddox (Hickman)	Democratic	November 1962 – January 1, 1970	Elected to finish Barnett's term. Reelected in 1963. Reelected in 1965. Reelected in 1967. Lost renomination.	1944–1964; Fulton and Hickman Counties.
Henry Maddox (Hickman)	Democratic	November 1962 – January 1, 1970	Elected to finish Barnett's term. Reelected in 1963. Reelected in 1965. Reelected in 1967. Lost renomination.	1964–1972; Ballard, Carlisle, Fulton, and Hickman Counties.
Ralph Ed Graves (Bardwell)	Democratic	January 1, 1970 – December 16, 1974	Elected in 1969. Reelected in 1971. Reelected in 1973. Resigned to become assistant press secretary of Julian Carroll.	1964–1972; Ballard, Carlisle, Fulton, and Hickman Counties.
Ralph Ed Graves (Bardwell)	Democratic	January 1, 1970 – December 16, 1974	Elected in 1969. Reelected in 1971. Reelected in 1973. Resigned to become assistant press secretary of Julian Carroll.	1972–1974; Ballard, Carlisle, Fulton, and Hickman Counties.
Ralph Ed Graves (Bardwell)	Democratic	January 1, 1970 – December 16, 1974	Elected in 1969. Reelected in 1971. Reelected in 1973. Resigned to become assistant press secretary of Julian Carroll.	1974–1985; Ballard, Carlisle, Fulton, and Hickman Counties.
Ward Burnette (Fulton)	Democratic	January 1, 1976 – December 1987	Elected in 1975. Reelected in 1977. Reelected in 1979. Reelected in 1981. Reelected in 1984. Reelected in 1986. Resigned after being elected Commissioner of Agriculture.	1974–1985; Ballard, Carlisle, Fulton, and Hickman Counties.
Ward Burnette (Fulton)	Democratic	January 1, 1976 – December 1987	Elected in 1975. Reelected in 1977. Reelected in 1979. Reelected in 1981. Reelected in 1984. Reelected in 1986. Resigned after being elected Commissioner of Agriculture.	1985–1993; Ballard, Carlisle, Fulton, Hickman, and McCracken (part) Counties.
Charles Geveden (Wickliffe)	Democratic	January 1988 – January 1, 2005	Elected to finish Burnette's term. Reelected in 1988. Reelected in 1990. Reelected in 1992. Reelected in 1994. Reelected in 1996. Reelected in 1998. Reelected in 2000. Reelected in 2002. Lost reelection.	1985–1993; Ballard, Carlisle, Fulton, Hickman, and McCracken (part) Counties.
Charles Geveden (Wickliffe)	Democratic	January 1988 – January 1, 2005	Elected to finish Burnette's term. Reelected in 1988. Reelected in 1990. Reelected in 1992. Reelected in 1994. Reelected in 1996. Reelected in 1998. Reelected in 2000. Reelected in 2002. Lost reelection.	1993–1997; Ballard, Carlisle, Fulton, Hickman, and McCracken (part) Counties.
Charles Geveden (Wickliffe)	Democratic	January 1988 – January 1, 2005	Elected to finish Burnette's term. Reelected in 1988. Reelected in 1990. Reelected in 1992. Reelected in 1994. Reelected in 1996. Reelected in 1998. Reelected in 2000. Reelected in 2002. Lost reelection.	1997–2003
Charles Geveden (Wickliffe)	Democratic	January 1988 – January 1, 2005	Elected to finish Burnette's term. Reelected in 1988. Reelected in 1990. Reelected in 1992. Reelected in 1994. Reelected in 1996. Reelected in 1998. Reelected in 2000. Reelected in 2002. Lost reelection.	2003–2015
Steven Rudy (Paducah)	Republican	January 1, 2005 – present	Elected in 2004. Reelected in 2006. Reelected in 2008. Reelected in 2010. Reelected in 2012. Reelected in 2014. Reelected in 2016. Reelected in 2018. Reelected in 2020. Reelected in 2022. Reelected in 2024. Reelected in 2026.	2003–2015
Steven Rudy (Paducah)	Republican	January 1, 2005 – present	Elected in 2004. Reelected in 2006. Reelected in 2008. Reelected in 2010. Reelected in 2012. Reelected in 2014. Reelected in 2016. Reelected in 2018. Reelected in 2020. Reelected in 2022. Reelected in 2024. Reelected in 2026.	2015–2023
Steven Rudy (Paducah)	Republican	January 1, 2005 – present	Elected in 2004. Reelected in 2006. Reelected in 2008. Reelected in 2010. Reelected in 2012. Reelected in 2014. Reelected in 2016. Reelected in 2018. Reelected in 2020. Reelected in 2022. Reelected in 2024. Reelected in 2026.	2023–present
