= Dick Castleman =

American politician

Member of the Kentucky House of Representatives from the 2nd district
- In office January 1, 1987 – May 19, 1991
- Preceded by: Lloyd E. Clapp
- Succeeded by: Robbie Castleman

Personal details
- Born: December 7, 1926
- Died: May 19, 1991 (aged 64)
- Party: Democratic

Richard G. Castleman (December 7, 1926 – May 19, 1991) was an American politician from Kentucky who was a member of the Kentucky House of Representatives from 1987 until his death in 1991. Castleman first elected in 1986 following the retirement of incumbent representative Lloyd E. Clapp. He died in office of a heart attack and was succeeded by his wife Robbie Castleman.
