= Fred Nesler =

American politician (1944–2026)

Member of the Kentucky House of Representatives from the 2nd district
- In office January 1, 1993 – May 31, 2012
- Preceded by: Robbie Castleman
- Succeeded by: Richard Heath

Personal details
- Born: August 2, 1944
- Died: May 14, 2026 (aged 81) Paducah, Kentucky, U.S.
- Party: Democratic

Fred L. Nesler (August 2, 1944 – May 14, 2026) was an American politician from Kentucky who was a member of the Kentucky House of Representatives from 1993 to 2013. Nesler was first elected in 1992 after defeating incumbent representative Robbie Castleman in the May primary election. He resigned from the house in 2012 and was succeeded by Republican Richard Heath. Nesler died on May 14, 2026, at the age of 81.
