= Steven Rudy =

American politician (born 1978)

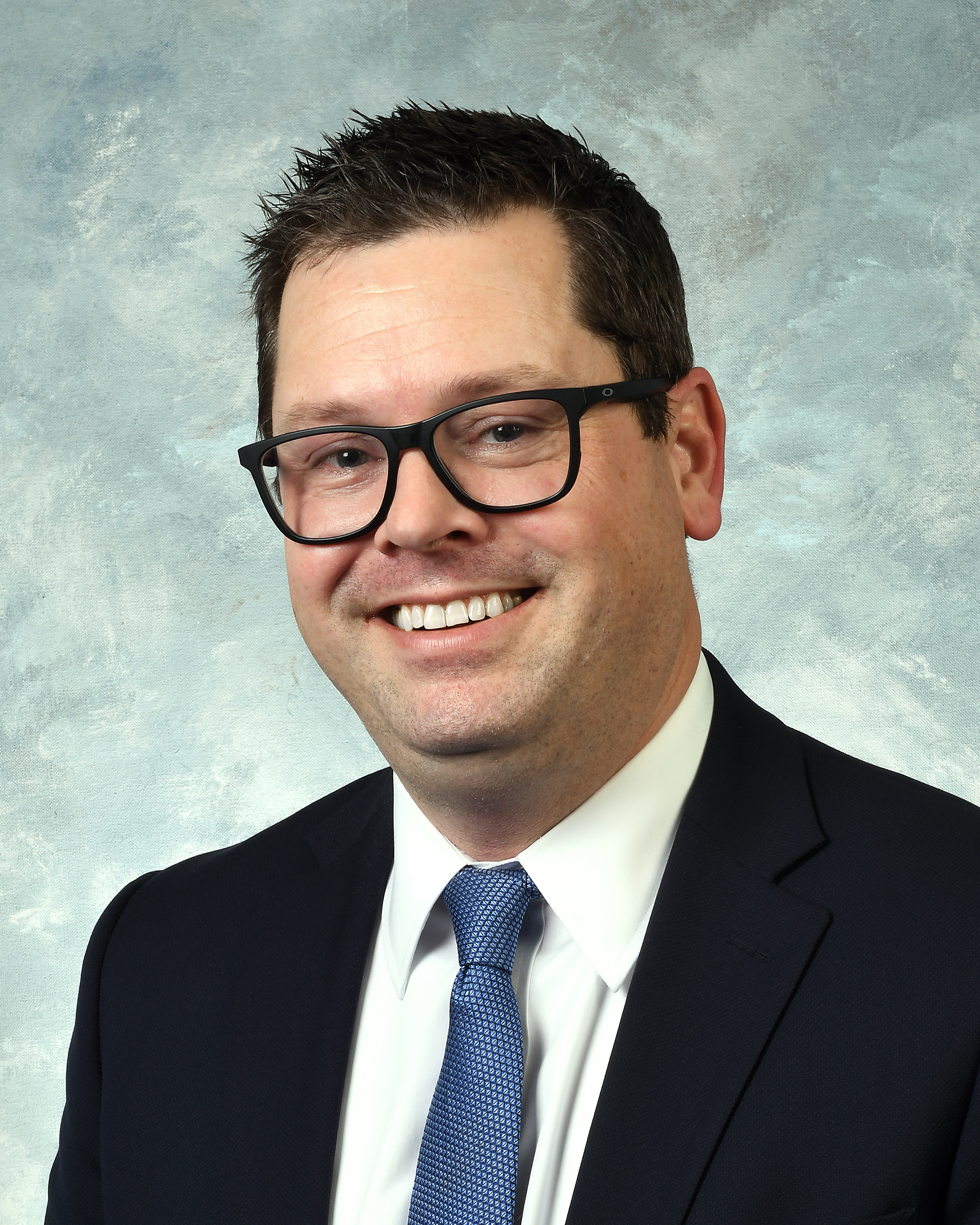
- Official portrait, 2021

Majority Leader of the Kentucky House of Representatives
- Incumbent
- Assumed office January 5, 2021
- Preceded by: Bam Carney

Member of the Kentucky House of Representatives from the 1st district
- Incumbent
- Assumed office January 1, 2005
- Preceded by: Charles Geveden

Personal details
- Born: Steven Jack Rudy; August 9, 1978 (age 48)
- Party: Republican
- Spouse: Jessica Patton Rudy (m. 2006; died 2026)
- Education: West Kentucky Community and Technical College (attended); Murray State University (BA)

Steven Jack Rudy (born August 9, 1978) is an American politician and agribusiness owner who has served as a Republican member of the Kentucky House of Representatives since January 2005. He represents Kentucky's 1st House district, which includes Ballard, Carlisle, Fulton, and Hickman counties as well as part of McCracken County.

He has served as the House Majority Leader since 2021.

== Early life ==
Steven Jack Rudy was born to parents Jack and Jeanette Rudy of Ballard County on August 9, 1978. Rudy was educated in the Ballard County School system and graduated from Ballard Memorial High School in 1996. Rudy attended college at the former Paducah Community College (now West Kentucky Community and Technical College) and graduated from Murray State University in 2000 with a Bachelor of Arts in agriculture education. While at Murray, he was a member of the Future Farmers of America.

== Political career ==
Rudy was 26 when he made his first bid for public office in 2004. His opponent, Democrat Charles Geveden, had held the seat for 17 years and co-chaired the Kentucky General Assembly's Interim Joint Committee on State Government.

Democrat Mike Lawrence, who ran against Rudy in 2008 and 2010, served several terms as McCracken County circuit court clerk. Rudy's 2020 Republican primary challenger, Carroll Hubbard, had represented Kentucky's 1st congressional district as a Democrat from 1975 to 1993. Hubbard switched parties in 2019.

=== Nuclear Energy ===
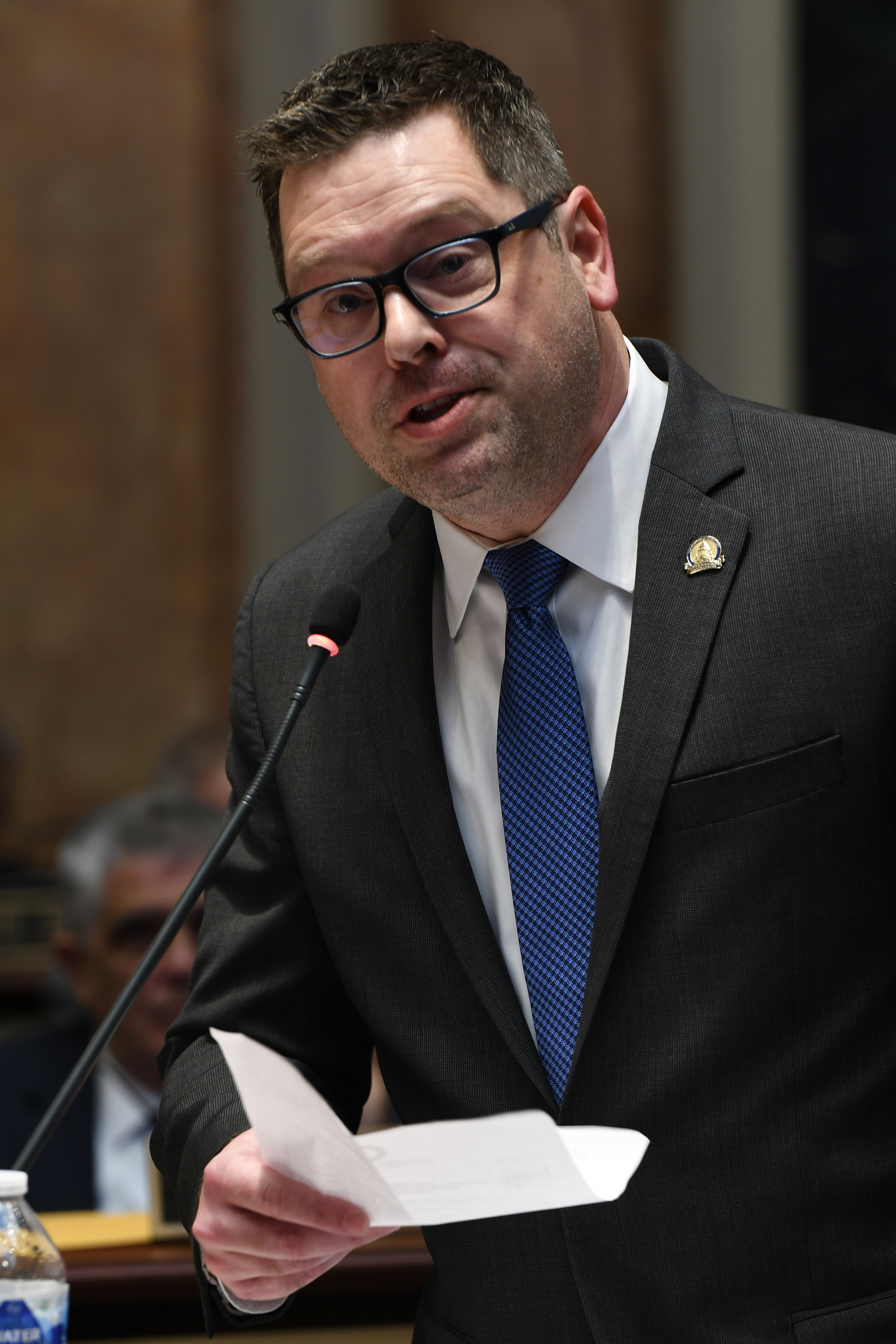
Rudy has served as Majority Floor Leader of the Kentucky House since January 2021.

In the 2008 session of the Kentucky General Assembly, Rudy introduced legislation that would allow for nuclear plants to be built in Kentucky without having a permanent waste disposal facility, in an attempt to end the state's moratorium on nuclear power plants. The legislation did not pass.

In the 2009 regular session of the Kentucky General Assembly, Rudy refiled legislation to lift the moratorium on nuclear power plants. The General Assembly adjourned sine die that year without the matter passing the house, but the moratorium was later lifted during the 2017 regular session with the passage of the Robert J. Lepper Act. Rudy voted in favor of the bill's passage.

=== Elections ===
Rudy received the Republican nomination without a primary vote in 2004, 2006, 2008, 2010, 2012, 2014, 2016, 2018, 2024, and 2026. In Kentucky, candidates without primary opponents do not appear on the primary ballot.

==== 2004 ====
Kentucky House District 1 general election, November 2, 2004
Party	Candidate	Votes	%
Republican	Steven Rudy	9,749	54.6
Democratic	Charles Geveden (incumbent)	8,107	45.4
Total votes		17,856	100.0

==== 2006 ====
Kentucky House District 1 general election, November 7, 2006
Party	Candidate	Votes	%
Republican	Steven Rudy (incumbent)	8,226	57.7
Democratic	Thomas H. French	6,026	42.3
Total votes		14,252	100.0

==== 2008 ====
Kentucky House District 1 general election, November 4, 2008
Party	Candidate	Votes	%
Republican	Steven Rudy (incumbent)	9,753	53.4
Democratic	Mike Lawrence	8,505	46.6
Total votes		18,258	100.0

==== 2010 ====
Kentucky House District 1 general election, November 2, 2010
Party	Candidate	Votes	%
Republican	Steven Rudy (incumbent)	8,494	59.4
Democratic	Mike Lawrence	5,804	40.6
Total votes		14,298	100.0

==== 2012 ====
Kentucky House District 1 general election, November 6, 2012
Party	Candidate	Votes	%
Republican	Steven Rudy (incumbent)	14,080	100.0
Total votes		14,080	100.0

==== 2014 ====
Kentucky House District 1 general election, November 4, 2014
Party	Candidate	Votes	%
Republican	Steven Rudy (incumbent)	13,017	100.0
Total votes		13,017	100.0

==== 2016 ====
Kentucky House District 1 general election, November 8, 2016
Party	Candidate	Votes	%
Republican	Steven Rudy (incumbent)	14,046	70.2
Democratic	Michael Murphy	5,963	29.8
Total votes		20,009	100.0

==== 2018 ====
Kentucky House District 1 general election, November 6, 2018
Party	Candidate	Votes	%
Republican	Steven Rudy (incumbent)	11,050	67.0
Democratic	Desiree Owen	5,445	33.0
Total votes		16,495	100.0

==== 2020 ====
Kentucky House District 1 Republican primary, June 23, 2020
Party	Candidate	Votes	%
Republican	Steven Rudy (incumbent)	3,258	85.7
Republican	Carroll Hubbard	543	14.3
Total votes		3,801	100.0

Kentucky House District 1 general election, November 3, 2020
Party	Candidate	Votes	%
Republican	Steven Rudy (incumbent)	17,836	100.0
Total votes		17,836	100.0

==== 2022 ====
Kentucky House District 1 Republican primary, May 17, 2022
Party	Candidate	Votes	%
Republican	Steven Rudy (incumbent)	2,176	61.0
Republican	Christopher M. Tucker	1,394	39.0
Total votes		3,570	100.0

Kentucky House District 1 general election, November 8, 2022
Party	Candidate	Votes	%
Republican	Steven Rudy (incumbent)	12,590	100.0
Total votes		12,590	100.0

==== 2024 ====
Kentucky House District 1 general election, November 5, 2024
Party	Candidate	Votes	%
Republican	Steven Rudy (incumbent)	16,074	76.7
Democratic	Fredrick Fountain	4,881	23.3
Total votes		20,955	100.0

==== 2026 ====
Kentucky House District 1 general election, November 3, 2026 (unofficial results)
Party	Candidate	Votes	%
Republican	Steven Rudy (incumbent)	10,897	100.0
Total votes		10,897	100.0

Kentucky House of Representatives
Preceded by Bam Carney	Majority Leader of the Kentucky House of Representatives; 2021–present	Incumbent
