= Kentucky's 2nd House of Representatives district =

American legislative district

Kentucky's 2nd State House of Representatives district
Representative
| Kim Holloway; R–Mayfield |
since January 1, 2025
- Registration: 48.8% Republican; 42.8% Democratic; 7.7% No party preference
- Demographics: 86.2% White; 3.9% Black; 6.4% Hispanic; 0.4% Asian; 0.3% Other; 2.8% Multiracial
- Population (2023): 44,484
- Registered voters (2025): 33,243

Kentucky's 2nd House of Representatives district is one of 100 districts in the Kentucky House of Representatives. Located in the far west of the state, it comprises the counties of Graves and part of McCracken. It has been represented by Kim Holloway (R–Mayfield) since 2025. As of 2023, the district had a population of 44,484.

== Voter registration ==
On January 1, 2025, the district had 33,243 registered voters, who were registered with the following parties.

| Party | Registration | |
| Party | Voters | % |
|---|---|---|
| Republican | 16,232 | 48.83 |
| Democratic | 14,243 | 42.85 |
| Independent | 1,059 | 3.19 |
| Libertarian | 153 | 0.46 |
| Green | 18 | 0.05 |
| Constitution | 17 | 0.05 |
| Socialist Workers | 7 | 0.02 |
| Reform | 3 | 0.01 |
| "Other" | 1,511 | 4.55 |
| Total | 33,243 | 100.00 |
Source: Kentucky State Board of Elections

== List of members representing the district ==
| Member | Party | Years | Electoral history | District location |
|---|---|---|---|---|
| Dick Castleman (Mayfield) | Democratic | January 1, 1987 – May 19, 1991 | Elected in 1986. Reelected in 1988. Reelected in 1990. Died. | 1985–1993; Graves County. |
| Robbie Castleman (Mayfield) | Democratic | August 1991 – January 1, 1993 | Elected to finish her husband's term. Lost renomination. | 1985–1993; Graves County. |
| Fred Nesler (Mayfield) | Democratic | January 1, 1993 – May 31, 2012 | Elected in 1992. Reelected in 1994. Reelected in 1996. Reelected in 1998. Reelected in 2000. Reelected in 2002. Reelected in 2004. Reelected in 2006. Reelected in 2008. Reelected in 2010. Resigned. | 1993–1997; Graves and McCracken (part) Counties. |
| Fred Nesler (Mayfield) | Democratic | January 1, 1993 – May 31, 2012 | Elected in 1992. Reelected in 1994. Reelected in 1996. Reelected in 1998. Reelected in 2000. Reelected in 2002. Reelected in 2004. Reelected in 2006. Reelected in 2008. Reelected in 2010. Resigned. | 1997–2003 |
| Fred Nesler (Mayfield) | Democratic | January 1, 1993 – May 31, 2012 | Elected in 1992. Reelected in 1994. Reelected in 1996. Reelected in 1998. Reelected in 2000. Reelected in 2002. Reelected in 2004. Reelected in 2006. Reelected in 2008. Reelected in 2010. Resigned. | 2003–2015 |
| Richard Heath (Mayfield) | Republican | November 2012 – January 1, 2025 | Elected to finish Nesler's term and also to the next term in 2012. Reelected in 2014. Reelected in 2016. Reelected in 2018. Reelected in 2020. Reelected in 2022. Lost renomination. | 2003–2015 |
| Richard Heath (Mayfield) | Republican | November 2012 – January 1, 2025 | Elected to finish Nesler's term and also to the next term in 2012. Reelected in 2014. Reelected in 2016. Reelected in 2018. Reelected in 2020. Reelected in 2022. Lost renomination. | 2015–2023 |
| Richard Heath (Mayfield) | Republican | November 2012 – January 1, 2025 | Elected to finish Nesler's term and also to the next term in 2012. Reelected in 2014. Reelected in 2016. Reelected in 2018. Reelected in 2020. Reelected in 2022. Lost renomination. | 2023–present |
| Kim Holloway (Mayfield) | Republican | January 1, 2025 – present | Elected in 2024. Reelected in 2026. | 2023–present |
