= Kentucky Route 121 =

State highway in Kentucky, United States

Kentucky Route 121
- KY 121 highlighted in red

Route information
- Maintained by KYTC
- Length: 69.383 mi (111.661 km)

Major junctions
- South end: SR 119 at the Kentucky–Tennessee state line
- US 641 in Murray; KY 80 near Mayfield; US 45 in Mayfield I-69 / US 45 Byp. in Mayfield; US 62 near Bardwell
- North end: US 51 / US 62 in Wickliffe

Location
- Country: United States
- State: Kentucky
- Counties: Calloway, Graves, Carlisle, Ballard

Highway system
- Kentucky State Highway System; Interstate; US; State; Parkways
← KY 120	→ KY 122

Kentucky Route 121 (KY 121) is a 69.383-mile-long (111.661 km) state highway in Kentucky. It runs from State Route 119 (SR 119) at the Kentucky–Tennessee state line southeast of New Concord to U.S. Route 51 (US 51) and US 62 in Wickliffe via Murray and Mayfield.

== Major intersections ==
County	Location	mi	km	Destinations	Notes
Calloway		0.000	0.000	SR 119 south	Southern terminus; Tennessee state line
Calloway	New Concord	4.749	7.643	KY 444 north (Dunbar Road)	Southern terminus of KY 444
Calloway		5.698	9.170	KY 280 west (Speaker Trail)	Eastern terminus of KY 280
Calloway		10.510	16.914	KY 893 west (New Providence Road)	Eastern terminus of KY 893
Calloway		13.142	21.150	KY 1497 south (Murray-Paris Road)	Northern terminus of KY 1497
Calloway	Murray	14.075	22.652	US 641 Bus. south (Glendale Road)	South end of US 641 Bus.
Calloway	Murray	15.127	24.345	KY 94 (Main Street)	
Calloway	Murray	15.604	25.112	KY 2075 south (Chestnut Street) / KY 2594 north (North 4th Street)	Southern terminus of KY 2075; northern terminus of KY 2594
Calloway	Murray	16.322	26.268	US 641 south (North 12th Street) / KY 1327 west (Chestnut Street)	North end of US 641 Bus. overlap; south end of US 641 overlap; northern terminus of US 641 Bus.; eastern terminus of KY 1327
Calloway	Murray	16.812	27.056	US 641 north (North 12th Street)	North end of US 641 overlap
Calloway	Murray	17.700	28.485	KY 774 east (Coldwater Road) / Lowes Drive	Western terminus of KY 774
Calloway		18.929	30.463	KY 1660 south (Robertson Road)	Northern terminus of KY 1660
Calloway		20.592	33.140	KY 783 north (Airport Road)	Southern terminus of KY 783
Calloway		21.602	34.765	KY 299 north (Kirksey Road)	South end of KY 299 overlap
Calloway		22.117	35.594	KY 299 south (Butterworth Road)	North end of KY 299 overlap
Calloway		24.397	39.263	KY 1836 south (Coopertown Road)	South end of KY 1836 overlap
Calloway		25.171	40.509	KY 1836 north (Hammond Road)	North end of KY 1836 overlap
Calloway–Graves county line		26.893	43.280	KY 893 east (County Line Road) / KY 1124 west	Western terminus of KY 893; eastern terminus of KY 1124
Graves		28.497	45.861	KY 564 north	South end of KY 564 overlap
Graves	Farmington	29.109	46.846	KY 564 south / Old KY 3122	North end of KY 564 overlap
Graves		30.895	49.721	KY 1890 west	Eastern terminus of KY 1890
Graves		32.392	52.130	KY 80 east	South end of KY 80 overlap
Graves		27.518	44.286	KY 1124 east	Western terminus of KY 1124
Graves		28.541	45.932	KY 940 north (Jeff Davis Road) / Jeff Davis Road	Southern terminus of KY 940
Graves		29.096	46.825	KY 2205 north	Southern terminus of KY 2205
Graves		35.628	57.338	KY 80 west / KY 121 Bus. north / KY 97 south	North end of KY 80 overlap; southern terminus of KY 121 Bus.; northern terminus of KY 97
Graves		37.105	59.715	KY 464 (Backusburg Road)	
Graves		37.745	60.745	KY 58 (East Broadway Street)	
Graves	Mayfield	39.067	62.872	US 45 (Paducah Road / KY 121 Bus. south)	Northern terminus of KY 121 Bus.
Graves	Mayfield	40.205	64.704	I-69 / US 45 Byp. – Benton, Fulton	I-69/US 45 Byp. exit 24
Graves		40.971	65.936	KY 1830 east (Jimtown Road) / Jimtown Road	Western terminus of KY 1830
Graves		42.919	69.071	KY 1276 east (Key Bottom Road) / New Hope Church Road	Western terminus of KY 1276
Graves		43.808	70.502	KY 440 north	Southern terminus of KY 440
Graves		44.172	71.088	KY 945 north (New Hope Church Road)	Southern terminus of KY 945
Graves		47.481	76.413	KY 1213	
Graves		49.147	79.094	KY 339	
Carlisle		52.580	84.619	KY 408 east	South end of KY 408 overlap
Carlisle		52.620	84.684	KY 408 west	North end of KY 408 overlap
Carlisle		54.248	87.304	KY 307	
Carlisle		58.268	93.773	US 62	
Carlisle		59.750	96.158	KY 1628 east / Magee Springs Road	Western terminus of KY 1628
Ballard		62.159	100.035	KY 802 north (New York Road)	Southern terminus of KY 802
Ballard	Wickliffe	69.050	111.125	KY 286 east (Phillips Drive)	Western terminus of KY 286
Ballard	Wickliffe	69.249	111.445	KY 1290 east (North Sixth Street)	Western terminus of KY 1290
Ballard	Wickliffe	69.383	111.661	US 51 / US 62 (Fourth Street) / Court Street	Northern terminus; continues as Court Street beyond US 51 / US 62
1.000 mi = 1.609 km; 1.000 km = 0.621 mi: Concurrency terminus

== Mayfield business loop ==
Kentucky Route 121 Business
- Location: Mayfield
- Length: 3.087 mi (4.968 km)

Kentucky Route 121 Business is a 3.087-mile-long (4.968 km) business route of Kentucky Route 121. It runs from Kentucky Route 121, Kentucky Route 80, and Kentucky Route 97 southeast of Mayfield to Kentucky Route 121 and U.S. Route 45 north of Mayfield. It runs through downtown, while KY 121 uses a bypass to the east and north. It runs concurrent with U.S. Route 45 for its final two miles.

=== Major intersections ===
The entire route is in Graves County.

Location	mi	km	Destinations	Notes
	0.000	0.000	KY 80 east / KY 97 south / KY 121	Southern terminus; south end of KY 80 overlap; northern terminus of KY 97
	0.175	0.282	KY 80 west	North end of KY 80 overlap
Mayfield	1.209	1.946	KY 303 south (Cuba Road) / South Third Street	Northern terminus of KY 303
Mayfield	1.723	2.773	KY 464 east (Backusburg Road)	Western terminus of KY 464
Mayfield	2.045	3.291	KY 58 east (East Broadway Street) / North Sixth Street	South end of KY 58 overlap
Mayfield	2.109	3.394	US 45 south / KY 58 west (South Eighth Street)	North end of KY 58 overlap; south end of US 45 overlap
Mayfield	3.087	4.968	US 45 north (Paducah Road) / KY 121	Northern terminus; north end of US 45 overlap
1.000 mi = 1.609 km; 1.000 km = 0.621 mi: Concurrency terminus
