= Kim Holloway =

American politician

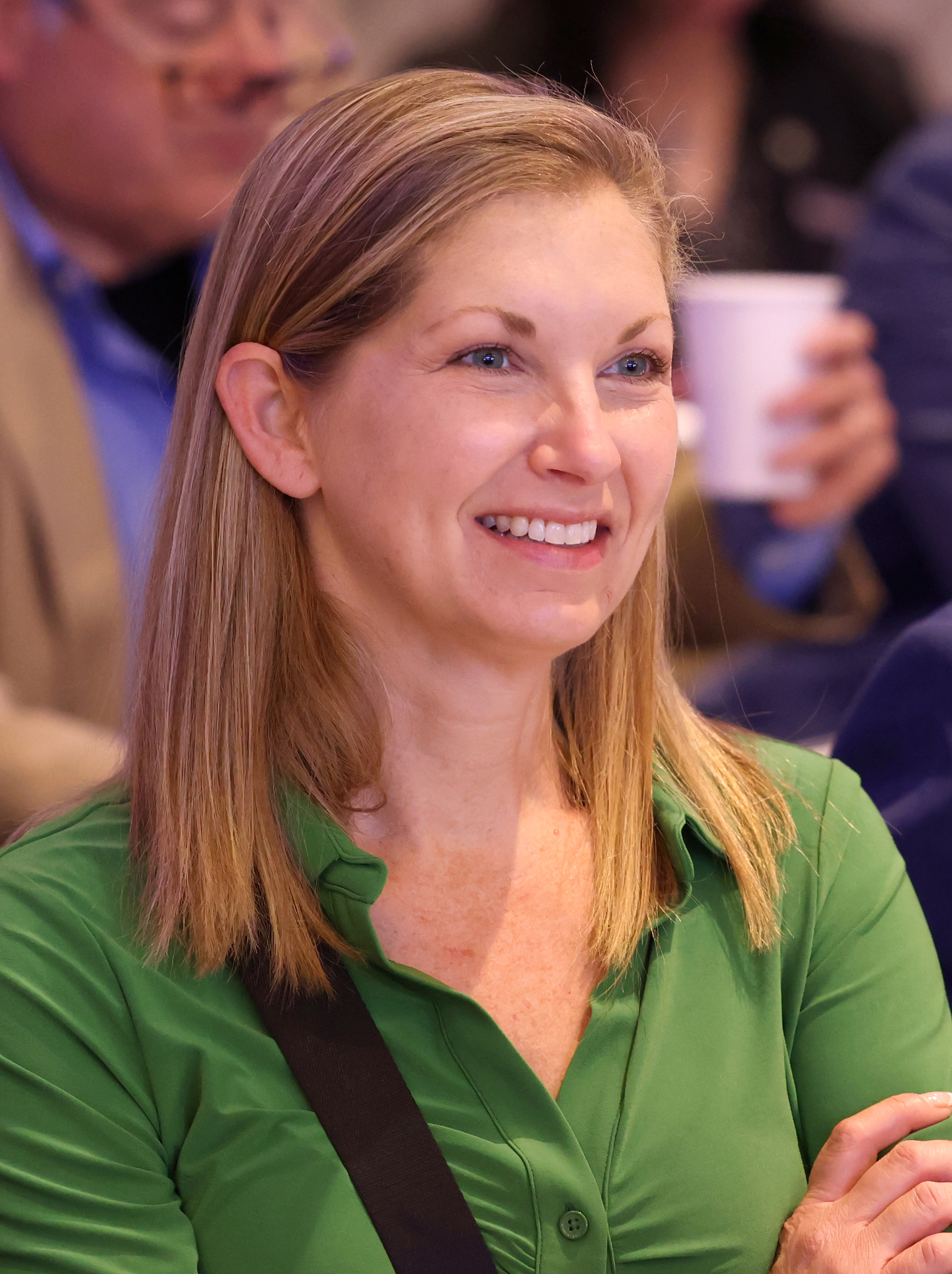
- Holloway at the 2024 Hazlitt Summit hosted by Young Americans for Liberty Foundation

Member of the Kentucky House of Representatives from the 2nd district
- Incumbent
- Assumed office January 1, 2025
- Preceded by: Richard Heath

Personal details
- Born: Paducah, Kentucky
- Party: Republican
- Other political affiliations: Libertarian (2020)
- Education: Murray State University (BA, MAeD); Lindenwood University (MA)
- Committees: Agriculture; Families and Children; Health Services

Kimberly M. Holloway (born November 4, 1978) is an American politician and member of the Kentucky House of Representatives from Kentucky's 2nd House district. Her district includes Graves County as well as part of McCracken County. She assumed office on January 1, 2025.

== Background ==
Holloway was born in Paducah, Kentucky, and graduated from Murray State University with a Bachelor of Arts in psychology in 2000. She would later return to Murray, graduating in 2011 with a Master of Arts in Education in school guidance and counseling. In 2014, she graduated from Lindenwood University with a Master of Arts in professional counseling.

She spent four years as a counselor for the Kentucky Department of Juvenile Justice, and is currently employed as the Social Services Director of a retirement community in Western Kentucky.

== Political career ==
Holloway was raised as a Republican, but temporarily changed her registration in 2020 and joined the Libertarian Party in protest of the government's "gross overreach" during the COVID-19 pandemic. By 2022, she had switched her registration back to the Republican Party.

In 2022, Holloway filed to challenge incumbent Republican Richard Heath, who chaired the Kentucky House Agriculture Committee. A circuit judge disqualified Holloway from the Republican primary after finding that one of the two voters who signed her candidacy declaration was a registered Democrat and that the notary had failed to administer the required oaths. Holloway continued her campaign as a write-in candidate in the general election.

Heath had represented the district for 12 years before Holloway took office. He challenged her in the 2026 Republican primary, which also drew Mayfield City Council member Nate Cox.

=== Elections ===
==== 2022 ====
Kentucky House District 2 general election, November 8, 2022
Party	Candidate	Votes	%
Republican	Richard Heath (incumbent)	10,922	82.6
Republican	Kim Holloway (write-in)	2,300	17.4
Total votes		13,222	100.0

==== 2024 ====
Kentucky House District 2 Republican primary, May 21, 2024
Party	Candidate	Votes	%
Republican	Kim Holloway	1,904	52.2
Republican	Richard Heath (incumbent)	1,743	47.8
Total votes		3,647	100.0

Kentucky House District 2 general election, November 5, 2024
Party	Candidate	Votes	%
Republican	Kim Holloway	16,855	100.0
Total votes		16,855	100.0

==== 2026 ====
Kentucky House District 2 Republican primary, May 19, 2026
Party	Candidate	Votes	%
Republican	Kim Holloway (incumbent)	3,026	56.8
Republican	Richard Heath	1,740	32.6
Republican	Nate Cox	566	10.6
Total votes		5,332	100.0

Kentucky House District 2 general election, November 3, 2026 (unofficial results)
Party	Candidate	Votes	%
Republican	Kim Holloway (incumbent)	10,435	100.0
Total votes		10,435	100.0
