= Charles Geveden =

American politician

Member of the Kentucky House of Representatives from the 1st district
- In office January 1988 – January 1, 2005
- Preceded by: Ward Burnette
- Succeeded by: Steven Rudy

Personal details
- Born: March 3, 1940 (age 86)
- Party: Democratic

Charles Robert Geveden (born March 3, 1940) is an American politician from Kentucky who was a member of the Kentucky House of Representatives from 1988 to 2005. Prior to his election he was an attorney in Wickliffe. Geveden was first elected in a December 1987 special election following the resignation of incumbent representative Ward Burnette to become the state agriculture commissioner. He won reelection to the house continuously until his defeat by Republican Steven Rudy in 2004.

Geveden was later chosen in 2007 by governor Steve Beshear to be the state's deputy secretary of justice and public safety. In 2014 Geveden was fined $5,000 by the Kentucky Executive Branch Ethics Commission for coercing his employees to donate to Beshear's reelection campaign. In response he stated that he "was not aware at the time that his actions were in violation" of the state ethics code.
