= Lone Oak, Kentucky =

Unincorporated community in Kentucky, United States

- Unincorporated community
- Flag

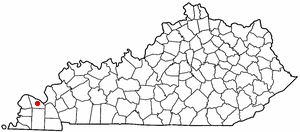
- Location of Lone Oak, Kentucky
- Coordinates: 37°2′10″N 88°39′58″W
- Country: United States
- State: Kentucky
- County: McCracken
- Established: 1

Area
  - Total: 0.27 sq mi (0.7 km^{2})
  - Land: 0.27 sq mi (0.7 km^{2})
  - Water: 0 sq mi (0.0 km^{2})
- Elevation: 472 ft (144 m)

Population (2000)
  - Total: 454
  - Density: 1,782/sq mi (688.1/km^{2})
- Time zone: UTC-6 (Central (CST))
  - Summer (DST): UTC-5 (CDT)
- ZIP code: 42001
- Area codes: 270 & 364
- FIPS code: 21-47512
- GNIS feature ID: 0496999

Lone Oak is an unincorporated community and former city in McCracken County, Kentucky, United States. The population was 454 at the 2000 census, the last before its disincorporation. It is a part of the Paducah, KY-IL Metropolitan Statistical Area.

== History ==
The area was named "Pepper's Mill" in 1875 after Dr. W.T. Pepper, an early resident of the area, who constructed a gristmill near the intersection of Lovelaceville Road and what is now US Highway 45. After "Pepper's Mill" was declined as a post office name in 1900, the name "Lone Oak" was chosen due to the large oak tree that stood at the intersection. The tree was cut down for a Christmas bonfire in 1903. A historical marker now sits on the site where the tree once stood.

On November 4, 2008, the citizens of Lone Oak voted 75–64 to dissolve the city. The area is still referred to as the community of Lone Oak, but all government jobs, including the mayor, city council, and police, were eliminated when the city was dissolved. The measure went into effect 30 days after the date of the vote.

== Geography ==
Lone Oak is located at 37°2′10″N 88°39′58″W (37.036165, -88.666131). The area of the former city is split between the census-designated places of Hendron to the east and Massac to the west, with U.S. Route 45 (Lone Oak Road) serving as the boundary. The Paducah city limits touch what had been the northeast corner of Lone Oak. Downtown Paducah is 5 miles (8 km) to the northeast and Mayfield is 21 miles (34 km) to the south via US 45.

According to the United States Census Bureau, the city of Lone Oak had a total area of 0.2 square miles (0.52 km^{2}), all land.

== Demographics ==
As of the census of 2000, there were 454 people, 220 households, and 128 families residing in the city. The population density was 1,782.2 inhabitants per square mile (688.1/km^{2}). There were 250 housing units at an average density of 981.4 units per square mile (378.9 units/km^{2}). The racial makeup of the city was 93.83% White, 1.76% African American, 0.22% Asian, 2.64% from other races, and 1.54% from two or more races. Hispanics or Latinos of any race were 4.19% of the population.

There were 220 households, out of which 22.3% had children under the age of 18 living with them, 41.4% were married couples living together, 10.5% had a female householder with no husband present, and 41.8% were non-families. 38.2% of all households were made up of individuals, and 17.3% had someone living alone who was 65 years of age or older. The average household size was 2.06 and the average family size was 2.68.

The age distribution was 17.4% under the age of 18, 12.1% from 18 to 24, 31.1% from 25 to 44, 20.3% from 45 to 64, and 19.2% who were 65 years of age or older. The median age was 40 years. For every 100 females, there were 84.6 males. For every 100 females age 18 and over, there were 81.2 males.

The median income for a household in the city was $31,250, and the median income for a family was $35,938. Males had a median income of $30,417 versus $19,833 for females. The per capita income for the city was $17,512. About 10.6% of families and 15.3% of the population were below the poverty line, including 20.4% of those under age 18 and 11.1% of those age 65 or over.

== Education ==
The former municipality is in the McCracken County Public Schools school district.

The district operates Lone Oak Elementary School.
