= Massac, Kentucky =

Census-designated place in Kentucky, United States

- Census-designated place
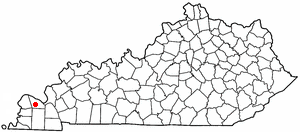
- Location in Kentucky
- Coordinates: 37°1′48″N 88°40′53″W
- Country: United States
- State: Kentucky
- County: McCracken

Area
  - Total: 4.07 sq mi (10.54 km^{2})
  - Land: 4.04 sq mi (10.47 km^{2})
  - Water: 0.027 sq mi (0.07 km^{2})
- Elevation: 460 ft (140 m)

Population (2020)
  - Total: 4,635
  - Density: 1,146.4/sq mi (442.63/km^{2})
- Time zone: UTC-6 (Central (CST))
  - Summer (DST): UTC-5 (CDT)
- ZIP code: 42001 (Paducah)
- Area codes: 270 & 364
- FIPS code: 21-50556
- GNIS feature ID: 0508556

Massac is a census-designated place (CDP) in McCracken County, Kentucky, United States. The population was 4,635 at the 2020 census. It is part of the Paducah, KY-IL Metropolitan Statistical Area.

== Geography ==
Massac is located at 37°1′48″N 88°40′53″W (37.030066, -88.681369) and borders the southwest side of Paducah. U.S. Route 62 (Blandville Road) serves as the border between Massac and Paducah. U.S. Route 45 (Lone Oak Road) forms the eastern edge of the Massac CDP, with the CDP of Hendron to the east. The unincorporated community of Lone Oak, centered on US 45, is split between the two CDPs.

According to the United States Census Bureau, the Massac CDP has a total area of 4.07 square miles (10.54 km^{2}), of which 0.03 square miles (0.08 km^{2}), or 0.64%, are water. The CDP's western boundary follows Massac Creek, a north-flowing tributary of the Ohio River.

== Demographics ==
Historical population
Census	Pop.	Note	%±
1990	3,733		—
2000	3,888		4.2%
2010	4,505		15.9%
2020	4,635		2.9%
U.S. Decennial Census

=== 2020 census ===
As of the 2020 census, Massac had a population of 4,635. The median age was 40.8 years. 24.5% of residents were under the age of 18 and 19.7% of residents were 65 years of age or older. For every 100 females there were 91.3 males, and for every 100 females age 18 and over there were 89.5 males age 18 and over.

96.0% of residents lived in urban areas, while 4.0% lived in rural areas.

There were 1,966 households in Massac, of which 30.0% had children under the age of 18 living in them. Of all households, 45.1% were married-couple households, 16.9% were households with a male householder and no spouse or partner present, and 32.7% were households with a female householder and no spouse or partner present. About 31.4% of all households were made up of individuals and 13.0% had someone living alone who was 65 years of age or older.

There were 2,132 housing units, of which 7.8% were vacant. The homeowner vacancy rate was 2.2% and the rental vacancy rate was 8.9%.

Racial composition as of the 2020 census
Race	Number	Percent
White	3,871	83.5%
Black or African American	368	7.9%
American Indian and Alaska Native	6	0.1%
Asian	51	1.1%
Native Hawaiian and Other Pacific Islander	0	0.0%
Some other race	50	1.1%
Two or more races	289	6.2%
Hispanic or Latino (of any race)	143	3.1%

=== 2000 census ===
As of the census of 2000, there were 3,888 people, 1,610 households, and 1,189 families residing in the CDP. The population density was 1,005.7/sq mi (387.9/km^{2}). There were 1,693 housing units at an average density of 437.9 per square mile (169.1/km^{2}). The racial makeup of the CDP was 94.80% White, 2.70% African American, 0.26% Native American, 0.85% Asian, 0.05% Pacific Islander, 0.23% from other races, and 1.11% from two or more races. Hispanic or Latino of any race were 1.26% of the population.

There were 1,610 households, out of which 34.4% had children under the age of 18 living with them, 60.5% were married couples living together, 10.7% had a female householder with no husband present, and 26.1% were non-families. 21.9% of all households were made up of individuals, and 7.0% had someone living alone who was 65 years of age or older. The average household size was 2.41 and the average family size was 2.81.

In the CDP, the population was spread out, with 24.6% under the age of 18, 8.3% from 18 to 24, 27.4% from 25 to 44, 27.0% from 45 to 64, and 12.7% who were 65 years of age or older. The median age was 39 years. For every 100 females, there were 91.1 males. For every 100 females age 18 and over, there were 86.3 males.

The median income for a household in the CDP was $46,201, and the median income for a family was $61,105. Males had a median income of $39,413 versus $25,240 for females. The per capita income for the CDP was $22,519. About 7.2% of families and 11.4% of the population were below the poverty line, including 20.2% of those under age 18 and 5.7% of those age 65 or over.

== Education ==
It is in the McCracken County School District.
