= Melber, Kentucky =

Unincorporated community in Kentucky, United States

- Unincorporated community
- Location within Kentucky Location within the United States
- Coordinates: 36°56′47″N 88°43′31″W
- Country: United States
- State: Kentucky
- Counties: Graves, McCracken
- Elevation: 374 ft (114 m)

Population (2016)
  - Total: 787
- Time zone: UTC-6 (Central (CST))
  - Summer (DST): UTC-5 (CDT)
- ZIP Code: 42069
- Area codes: 270 & 364
- GNIS feature ID: 498042

Melber (also known as Burg and Lewisburg) is an unincorporated community in Graves and McCracken counties in the U.S. state of Kentucky.

Andy Melber, an early postmaster, gave the community his last name.

== Notable people ==
- Ray Smith, rockabilly musician
- Andy Melber, early postmaster
