= Lowes, Kentucky =

Census-designated place in Kentucky, United States

- Census-designated place
- Coordinates: 36°53′08″N 88°46′26″W
- Country: United States
- State: Kentucky
- County: Graves

Area
  - Total: 0.69 sq mi (1.78 km^{2})
  - Land: 0.68 sq mi (1.77 km^{2})
  - Water: 0 sq mi (0.00 km^{2})
- Elevation: 469 ft (143 m)

Population (2020)
  - Total: 92
  - Density: 134.3/sq mi (51.84/km^{2})
- Time zone: UTC-6 (Central (CST))
  - Summer (DST): UTC-5 (CDT)
- Area codes: 270 & 364
- GNIS feature ID: 497318

Lowes is an unincorporated community and census-designated place (CDP) in Graves County, Kentucky, United States. Lowes is 13 miles (21 km) northwest of Mayfield. As of the 2020 census, Lowes had a population of 92.

== Demographics ==
Historical population
Census	Pop.	Note	%±
2020	92		—
U.S. Decennial Census

== Notable people ==
- Alben W. Barkley, U.S. Senator and Vice President of the United States, born near Lowes
- J. Paul Hogan, pioneer in the invention of the plastics industry, born in Lowes
