= New Concord, Kentucky =

Unincorporated community in Kentucky, United States

- Unincorporated community
- Location within the state of Kentucky New Concord (the United States)
- Coordinates: 36°32′54″N 88°9′17″W
- Country: United States
- State: Kentucky
- County: Calloway
- Elevation: 413 ft (126 m)
- Time zone: UTC-6 (Central (CST))
  - Summer (DST): UTC-5 (CST)
- ZIP codes: 42076
- Area code: 270
- GNIS feature ID: 499305

New Concord is an unincorporated community in Calloway County, Kentucky, United States.

== History ==
On March 2, 1836, a post office was opened at the site and it was named as being located at Humility, Kentucky. Settlers from Concord, North Carolina came to the area in the late 1830s and renamed Humility to Concord in 1835. The post office was renamed New Concord in 1861 because there was already a Concord, Kentucky in Lewis County. Thus after existing as Concord since 1835, the community was incorporated with the new name of New Concord in 1868.

Fort Heiman, a Confederate gun emplacement constructed during the Battle of Fort Henry, is one and a half miles southeast of the community and is part of Fort Donelson National Battlefield.

In 1955, the New Concord community received international recognition from Hollywood with that year's release of the Burt Lancaster directed and also top role performed film The Kentuckian (1955 film) a historical film project which portrayed 1820s Kentucky. Much of that film's content took place in a community named Humility, a former name for New Concord, as the film's lead role awaited the arrival of river transportation from Kentucky to Texas.
