= Wheel, Kentucky =

Unincorporated community in Kentucky, United States

- Unincorporated community
- Location within Kentucky Location within the United States
- Coordinates: 36°51′20″N 88°48′13″W
- Country: United States
- State: Kentucky
- County: Graves
- Elevation: 482 ft (147 m)
- Time zone: UTC-6 (Central (CST))
  - Summer (DST): UTC-5 (CST)
- GNIS feature ID: 509348

Wheel is an unincorporated community located in Graves County, Kentucky.

== Notable people ==
- Alben W. Barkley, Vice President of the United States (1949–1953).
