= Fancy Farm, Kentucky =

Census-designated place in Kentucky, United States

- Census-designated place
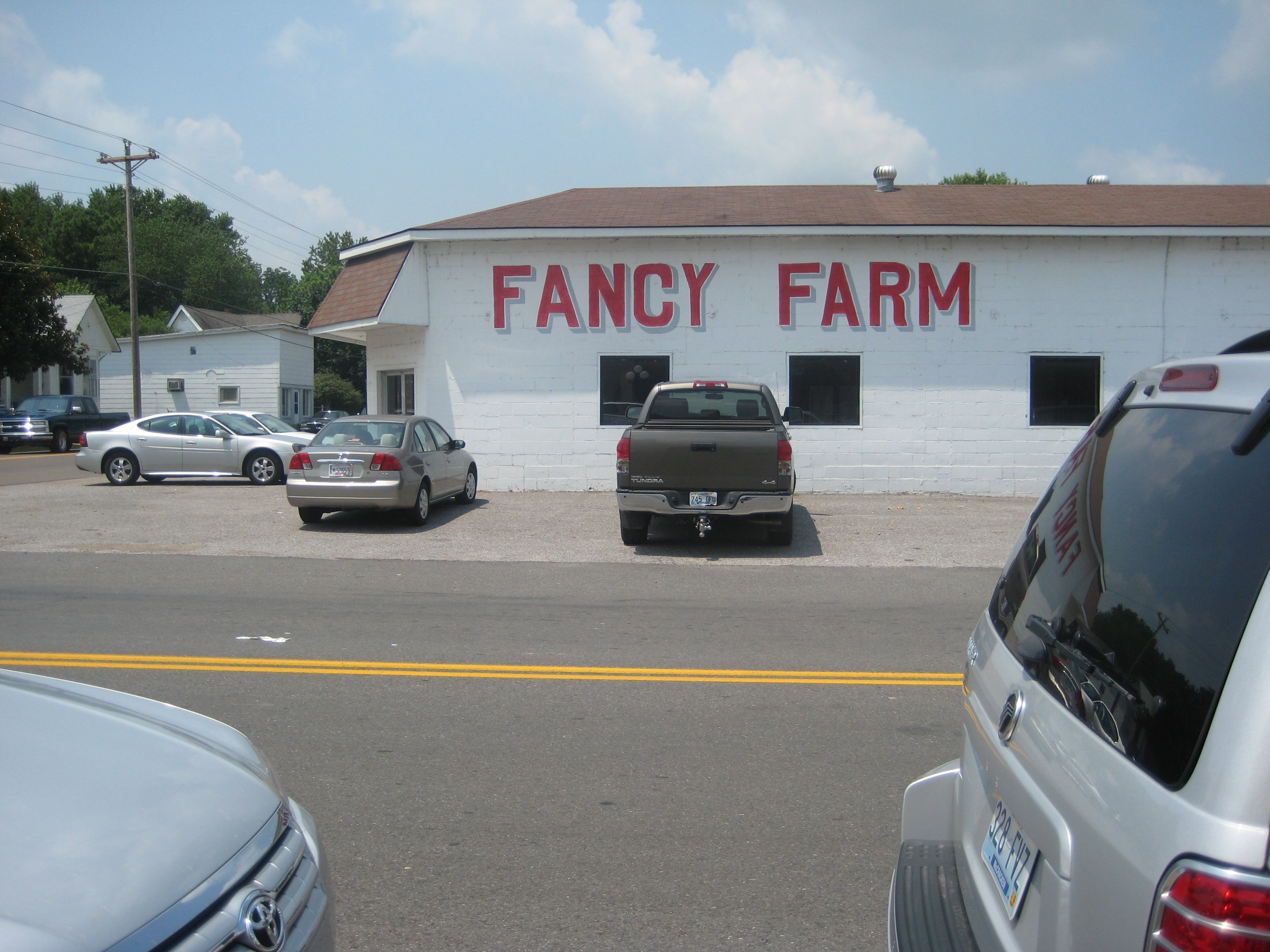
- Street scene in Fancy Farm

- Fancy Farm's location in Kentucky
- Coordinates: 36°47′56″N 88°47′29″W
- Country: United States
- State: Kentucky
- County: Graves

Area
  - Total: 0.88 sq mi (2.27 km^{2})
  - Land: 0.88 sq mi (2.27 km^{2})
  - Water: 0.0039 sq mi (0.01 km^{2})
- Elevation: 430 ft (130 m)

Population (2020)
  - Total: 403
  - Density: 460.1/sq mi (177.63/km^{2})
- Time zone: UTC-6 (Central (CST))
  - Summer (DST): UTC-5 (CDT)
- ZIP Code: 42039
- Area codes: 270 & 364
- GNIS feature ID: 2629613

Fancy Farm is an unincorporated community and census-designated place in Graves County, Kentucky, United States, 10 miles (16 km) northwest of the county seat, Mayfield. As of the 2020 census it had a population of 403.

Fancy Farm is on Kentucky Route 80 in the rural, far-western portion of the state called the Jackson Purchase. It was settled by Catholics starting in 1829, and is known for being a strongly Catholic area. The community grew around St. Jerome Church, built in 1836. The first post office opened in 1843. The colorful name was apparently chosen when the post office opened, by a man who was applying to be postmaster. It was first mentioned in the U.S. Census in 1870 as a post office in Boswell Precinct; first mentioned as a town in Magisterial District 5 in the 1910 census; and finally enumerated as a town in its own precinct in the 1920 census.

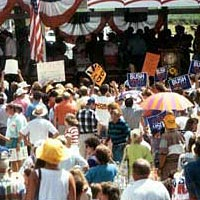
A crowd gathers to hear a stump speech at the Fancy Farm picnic.

== St. Jerome Church Picnic ==
The village is the site of the annual St. Jerome Catholic Church Picnic, famous as a traditional political gathering attracting statewide and occasionally national candidates. The picnic, referred to by non-locals as the "Fancy Farm Picnic," began in 1881 as a purely local affair. It takes place on the grounds of the church, which have expanded thanks in part to the picnic's success. Since 1956, the year that Kentucky moved its primary election to May from August, it has been held on the first Saturday in August and has come to represent the traditional starting point of the fall campaign season in Kentucky. It is the premiere annual political event in the state, in and out of campaign season.

The picnic was of largely local interest until two-time Governor A. B. "Happy" Chandler (best known for being the second Commissioner of Major League Baseball) began making appearances, going for the first time in 1931 while running successfully for lieutenant governor.

So many Kentucky politicians routinely attend that it is news when a major state politician decides not to make an appearance, such as with U.S. Sen. Jim Bunning in 2007 and, after some forty-two years of attendance, Sen. Mitch Connell in July 2026. National figures who have made speeches include George Wallace in 1975, Lloyd Bentsen in 1988 and Al Gore in 1992. Vice President Alben Barkley, who was born at nearby Wheel and lived in Paducah, spoke many times over the years.

In addition to the political appearances, the picnic offers traditional fair activities such as bingo games and raffle prizes. Food includes barbecue, a Knights of Columbus fish fry on Friday evening and homemade baked goods. The event was recognized in the 1985 Guinness Book of World Records as the "World's Largest Picnic" for the consumption of 15,000 pounds of mutton, pork, and chicken at the 1982 picnic.

The picnic proceeds are used to finance the Catholic elementary school and local improvements. No outside vendors participate, but people representing political causes sell paraphernalia, and about 12,000 to 15,000 people attend each year.

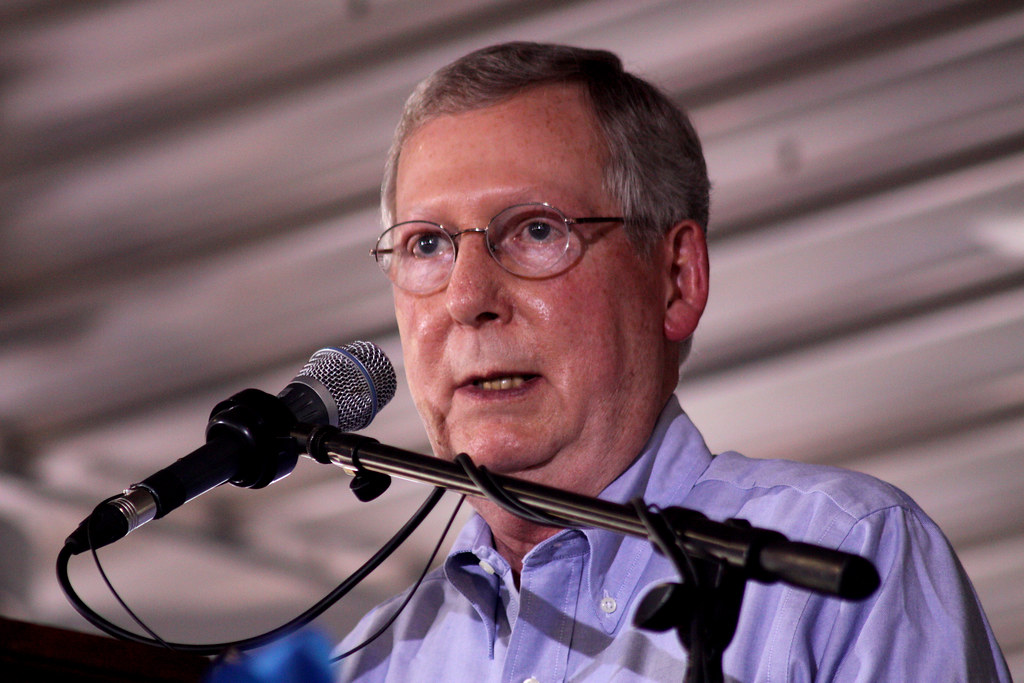
Mitch McConnell, August 8, 2010.

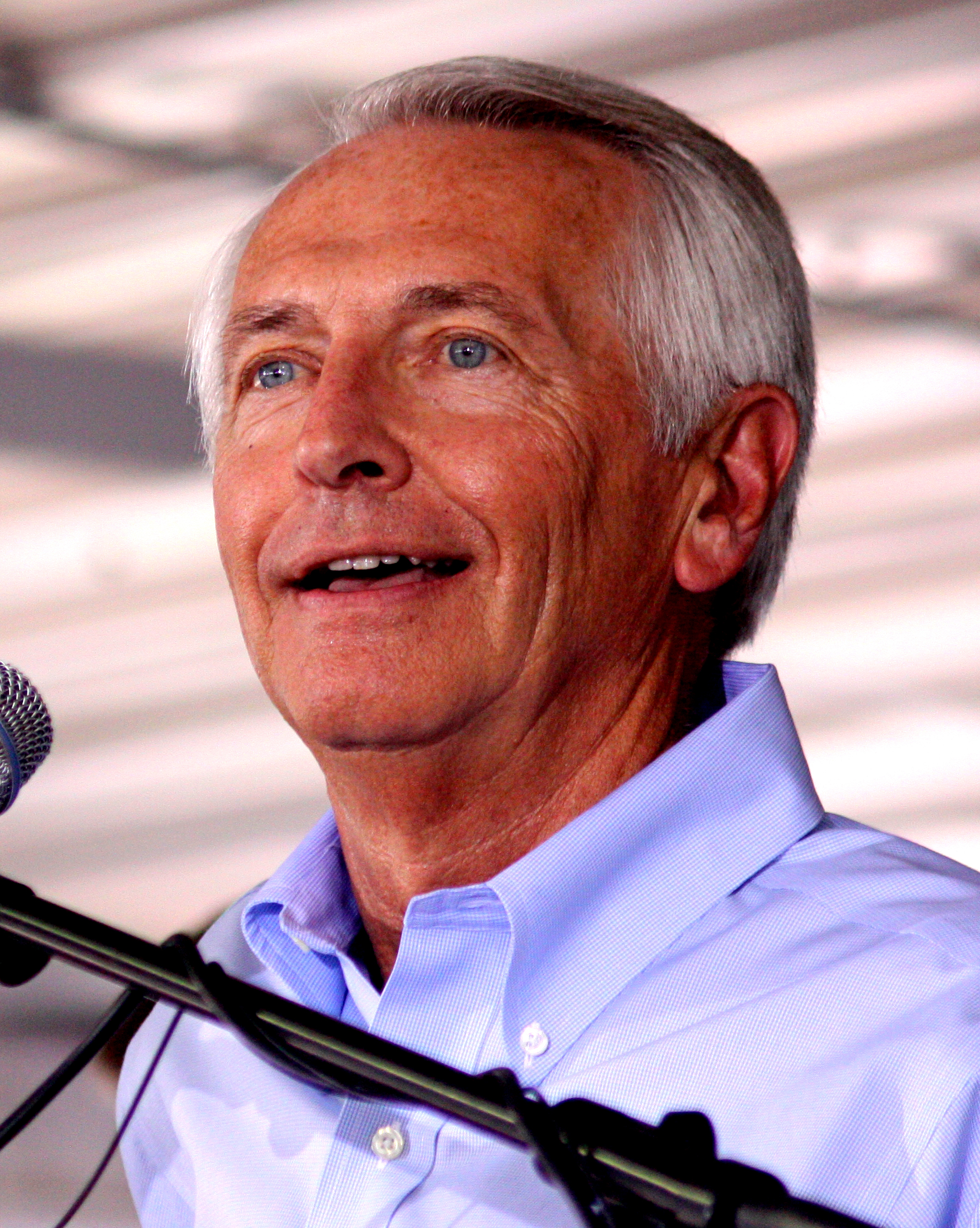
Steve Beshear, August 7, 2010.

== Demographics ==
Historical population
Census	Pop.	Note	%±
2020	403		—
U.S. Decennial Census
