= Wingo, Kentucky =

- City
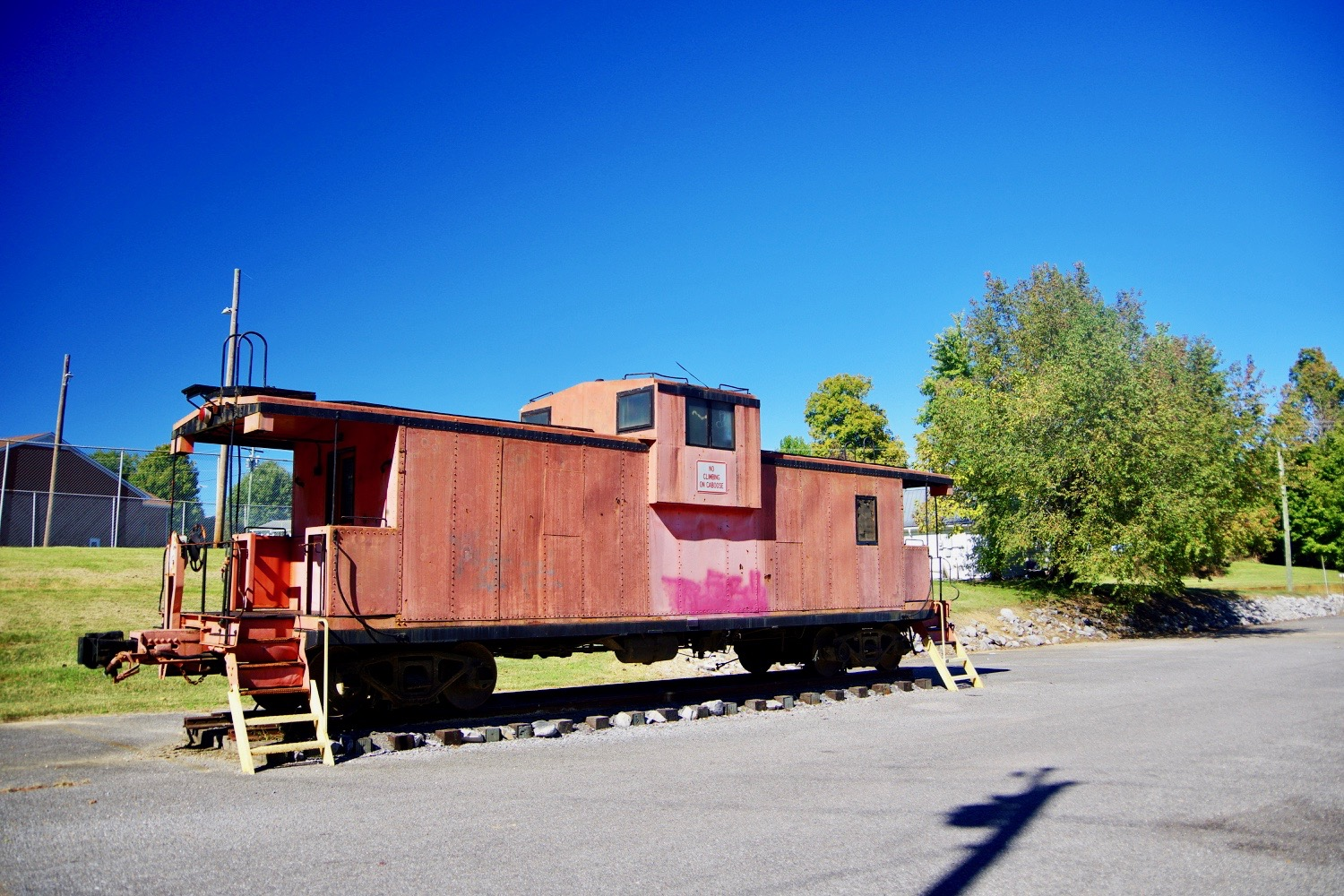
- Caboose on display in Wingo

- Location of Wingo in Graves County, Kentucky.
- Coordinates: 36°38′41″N 88°44′11″W
- Country: United States
- State: Kentucky
- County: Graves

Area
  - Total: 0.98 sq mi (2.54 km^{2})
  - Land: 0.98 sq mi (2.53 km^{2})
  - Water: 0.0077 sq mi (0.02 km^{2})
- Elevation: 502 ft (153 m)

Population (2020)
  - Total: 573
  - Density: 587.6/sq mi (226.89/km^{2})
- Time zone: UTC-6 (Central (CST))
  - Summer (DST): UTC-5 (CDT)
- ZIP code: 42088
- Area codes: 270 & 364
- FIPS code: 21-83856
- GNIS feature ID: 0506944

Wingo is a home rule-class city in Graves County, Kentucky, United States. As of the 2020 census, Wingo had a population of 573.

== History ==
Wingo was established in 1854 as a stop along the New Orleans and Ohio Railroad, a predecessor line of the Illinois Central. The city was originally named "Wingo's Station" for local landowner Jerman J. Wingo, who provided the land for the depot. A post office was moved to the station from nearby Point Curve in 1862, and the city incorporated in 1872. The "Station" was dropped from the name in 1882. In 2021, Wingo-born Clayton Ray Mullins was arrested and charged in the assault of Washington, D.C. Metropolitan Police Officer "A.W." amidst that year's United States Capitol Attack, which was the focus of a subsequent long-form story in the New York Times.

== Geography ==
Wingo is located 10 miles (16 km) southwest of Mayfield, the county seat, and 13 miles (21 km) northeast of Fulton, at 36°38′41″N 88°44′11″W (36.644711, -88.736509). U.S. Route 45 passes through the center of town connecting the two larger cities. Interstate 69 (formerly the Purchase Parkway) runs just west of Wingo, with access from Exit 14.

According to the United States Census Bureau, Wingo has a total area of 0.97 square miles (2.5 km^{2}), of which 0.01 square miles (0.02 km^{2}), or 0.70%, is water.

== Demographics ==
Historical population
Census	Pop.	Note	%±
1880	212		—
1890	451		112.7%
1900	418		−7.3%
1910	404		−3.3%
1920	419		3.7%
1930	479		14.3%
1940	475		−0.8%
1950	451		−5.1%
1960	340		−24.6%
1970	593		74.4%
1980	606		2.2%
1990	568		−6.3%
2000	581		2.3%
2010	632		8.8%
2020	573		−9.3%
U.S. Decennial Census

As of the census of 2000, there were 581 people, 246 households, and 177 families residing in the city. The population density was 640.3 inhabitants per square mile (247.2/km^{2}). There were 281 housing units at an average density of 309.7 per square mile (119.6/km^{2}). The racial makeup of the city was 96.21% White, 2.93% African American, 0.34% Native American, 0.17% from other races, and 0.34% from two or more races. Hispanic or Latino of any race were 1.20% of the population.

There were 246 households, out of which 32.1% had children under the age of 18 living with them, 51.2% were married couples living together, 15.9% had a female householder with no husband present, and 28.0% were non-families. 25.2% of all households were made up of individuals, and 15.0% had someone living alone who was 65 years of age or older. The average household size was 2.36 and the average family size was 2.71.

In the city, the population was spread out, with 26.7% under the age of 18, 6.5% from 18 to 24, 25.1% from 25 to 44, 24.6% from 45 to 64, and 17.0% who were 65 years of age or older. The median age was 39 years. For every 100 females, there were 82.7 males. For every 100 females age 18 and over, there were 82.1 males.

The median income for a household in the city was $28,083, and the median income for a family was $30,500. Males had a median income of $30,000 versus $19,375 for females. The per capita income for the city was $17,526. About 17.7% of families and 17.0% of the population were below the poverty line, including 18.0% of those under age 18 and 13.0% of those age 65 or over.
