= Cuba, Kentucky =

Unincorporated community in Kentucky, United States

- Unincorporated community
- Location within Kentucky Location within the United States
- Coordinates: 36°35′06″N 88°37′45″W
- Country: United States
- State: Kentucky
- County: Graves
- Elevation: 518 ft (158 m)
- Time zone: UTC-6 (Central (CST))
  - Summer (DST): UTC-5 (CDT)
- GNIS feature ID: 490449

Cuba is an unincorporated community in Graves County, Kentucky, United States.

Cuba was named for the Caribbean island Cuba, which at the time defenders of slavery hoped would be acquired from Spain. Under the influence of tobacco farming and subsequent trade and political interests, the community was named in 1854 during the release of the Ostend Manifesto. The Cuba post office, which had been opened in 1858, closed in 1905.

== Notable people ==
- Howie Crittenden, basketball player and coach, school administrator
- Bobbie Ann Mason, author
