= Sedalia, Kentucky =

Census-designated place in Kentucky, United States

- Census-designated place
- Location within Kentucky Location within the United States
- Coordinates: 36°38′35″N 88°36′13″W
- Country: United States
- State: Kentucky
- County: Graves

Area
  - Total: 1.19 sq mi (3.08 km^{2})
  - Land: 1.19 sq mi (3.07 km^{2})
  - Water: 0.0039 sq mi (0.01 km^{2})
- Elevation: 502 ft (153 m)

Population (2020)
  - Total: 279
  - Density: 235.7/sq mi (91.02/km^{2})
- Time zone: UTC-6 (Central (CST))
  - Summer (DST): UTC-5 (CDT)
- ZIP Code: 42079
- Area codes: 270 & 364
- GNIS feature ID: 2629678

Sedalia is an unincorporated community and census-designated place (CDP) in Graves County, Kentucky, United States. As of the 2020 census, Sedalia had a population of 279.

Sedalia is located 7 miles (11 km) south of Mayfield, the Graves County seat.

== Demographics ==
Historical population
Census	Pop.	Note	%±
2020	279		—
U.S. Decennial Census
