= McCracken County, Kentucky =

County in Kentucky, United States

- County
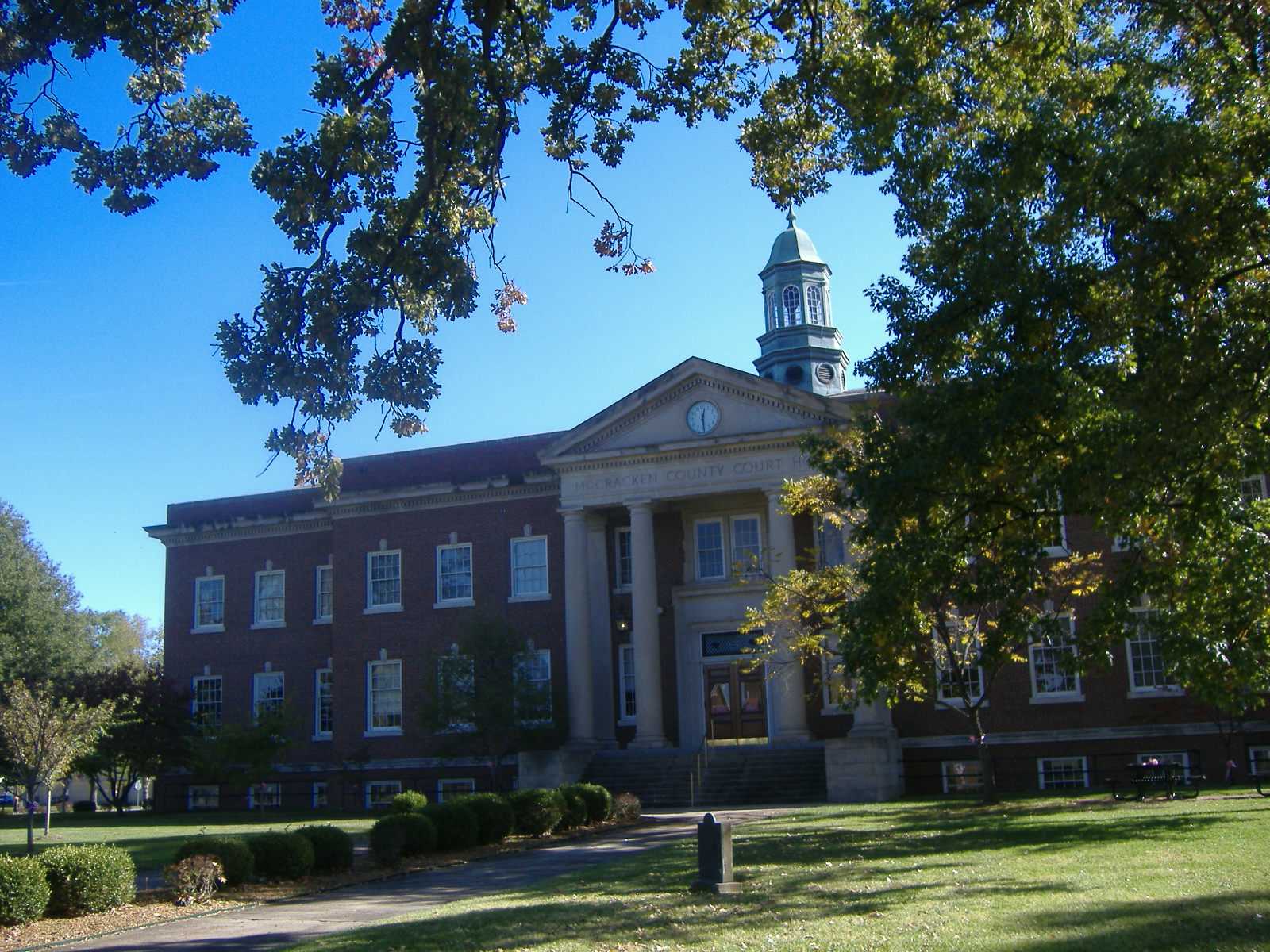
- McCracken County courthouse in Paducah

- Location within the U.S. state of Kentucky
- Coordinates: 37°04′N 88°43′W
- Country: United States
- State: Kentucky
- Founded: January 15th, 1825
- Named for: Virgil McCracken
- Seat: Paducah
- Largest city: Paducah

Government
  - Judge/Executive: Craig Clymer (R)

Area
  - Total: 268 sq mi (690 km^{2})
  - Land: 249 sq mi (640 km^{2})
  - Water: 19 sq mi (49 km^{2}) 7.2%

Population (2020)
  - Total: 67,875
  - Estimate (2025): 67,553 ▼
  - Density: 273/sq mi (105/km^{2})
- Time zone: UTC−6 (Central)
  - Summer (DST): UTC−5 (CDT)
- Congressional district: 1st
- Website: mccrackencountyky.gov

McCracken County is a county located in the far west portion of U.S. state of Kentucky. As of the 2020 census, the population was 67,875. The county seat and only municipality is Paducah. McCracken County was the 78th county formed in the state, having been created in 1825. It is part of the historic Jackson Purchase, territory sold by the Chickasaw people to General Andrew Jackson and Governor Isaac Shelby; this territory was located at the extreme western end of Kentucky.

Paducah developed based on its "River and Rail" traffic. Steamboats, barges, and the Illinois Central Railroad were the basis of the economy into the late 20th century. In the 1920s, the Illinois Central built the largest operating, and maintenance base in the world here.

McCracken County is the central county of the Paducah, KY-IL Metropolitan Statistical Area.

== History ==
McCracken County was founded in 1825 from Hickman County; it was named for Captain Virgil McCracken of Woodford County, Kentucky, who was killed in the Battle of Frenchtown in southeastern Michigan during the War of 1812.

The Battle of Paducah occurred during the American Civil War in McCracken County on March 25, 1864. The skirmish between the Union and Confederate troops ended in a Confederate victory. A total of 140 men were killed during the battle.

In addition to having an economy influenced by river traffic, the county's economy was strengthened by construction of the railroad to Paducah. The railroads based operations and maintenance in Paducah, and the men in many families had careers as firemen, repairment, and related jobs.

== Geography ==
According to the United States Census Bureau, the county has a total area of 268 square miles (690 km^{2}), of which 249 square miles (640 km^{2}) is land and 19 square miles (49 km^{2}) (7.2%) is water. The county's northern border with Illinois is formed by the Ohio River, and its northeastern border by the Tennessee River.

=== Adjacent counties ===
- Massac County, Illinois (north)
- Livingston County (northeast)
- Marshall County (east)
- Graves County (south)
- Carlisle County (southwest)
- Ballard County (west)

=== National protected area ===
- Clarks River National Wildlife Refuge (part)

== Demographics ==
Historical population
Census	Pop.	Note	%±
1830	1,297		—
1840	4,745		265.8%
1850	6,067		27.9%
1860	10,360		70.8%
1870	13,988		35.0%
1880	16,262		16.3%
1890	21,051		29.4%
1900	28,733		36.5%
1910	35,064		22.0%
1920	37,246		6.2%
1930	46,271		24.2%
1940	48,534		4.9%
1950	49,137		1.2%
1960	57,306		16.6%
1970	58,281		1.7%
1980	61,310		5.2%
1990	62,879		2.6%
2000	65,514		4.2%
2010	65,565		0.1%
2020	67,875		3.5%
2025 (est.)	67,553	▼	−0.5%
U.S. Decennial Census; 1790-1960 1900-1990; 1990-2000

=== 2020 census ===
As of the 2020 census, the county had a population of 67,875. The median age was 42.3 years. 21.8% of residents were under the age of 18 and 20.3% of residents were 65 years of age or older. For every 100 females there were 92.7 males, and for every 100 females age 18 and over there were 89.9 males age 18 and over.

The racial makeup of the county was 80.0% White, 11.2% Black or African American, 0.3% American Indian and Alaska Native, 1.0% Asian, 0.0% Native Hawaiian and Pacific Islander, 1.4% from some other race, and 6.0% from two or more races. Hispanic or Latino residents of any race comprised 3.1% of the population.

73.2% of residents lived in urban areas, while 26.8% lived in rural areas.

There were 28,932 households in the county, of which 27.6% had children under the age of 18 living with them and 31.7% had a female householder with no spouse or partner present. About 33.4% of all households were made up of individuals and 14.6% had someone living alone who was 65 years of age or older.

There were 32,040 housing units, of which 9.7% were vacant. Among occupied housing units, 63.6% were owner-occupied and 36.4% were renter-occupied. The homeowner vacancy rate was 2.1% and the rental vacancy rate was 8.1%.

=== 2000 census ===
As of the census of 2000, there were 65,514 people, 27,736 households, and 18,444 families residing in the county. The population density was 261 per square mile (101/km^{2}). There were 30,361 housing units at an average density of 121 per square mile (47/km^{2}). The racial makeup of the county was 86.76% White, 10.88% Black or African American, 0.22% Native American, 0.51% Asian, 0.05% Pacific Islander, 0.40% from other races, and 1.18% from two or more races. Hispanic or Latino of any race were 1.06% of the population.

There were 27,736 households, out of which 29.60% had children under the age of 18 living with them, 51.10% were married couples living together, 12.20% had a female householder with no husband present, and 33.50% were non-families. 29.70% of all households were made up of individuals, and 12.30% had someone living alone who was 65 years of age or older. The average household size was 2.31 and the average family size was 2.86.

In the county, the population was spread out, with 23.40% under the age of 18, 7.90% from 18 to 24, 28.10% from 25 to 44, 24.70% from 45 to 64, and 15.90% who were 65 years of age or older. The median age was 39 years. For every 100 females, there were 90.50 males. For every 100 females age 18 and over, there were 86.30 males.

The median income for a household in the county was $33,865, and the median income for a family was $42,513. Males had a median income of $36,417 versus $22,704 for females. The per capita income for the county was $19,533. About 11.40% of families and 15.10% of the population were below the poverty line, including 21.90% of those under age 18 and 12.30% of those age 65 or over.

== Education ==
Public elementary and secondary education in the county is provided by two school districts:

- McCracken County Public Schools, which serves the entire county except for the bulk of the city of Paducah, served by:
- Paducah Public Schools

Several private schools also provide K-12 education. These institutions include the St. Mary System and Community Christian Academy.

Higher education is provided by West Kentucky Community and Technical College in Paducah, part of the Kentucky Community and Technical College System. Like all other schools in this system, WKCTC offers associate degrees. The state's largest public university, the University of Kentucky, operates a branch campus of its College of Engineering at WKCTC. Murray State University offers bachelor's degree programs and master's degrees. A new 43,000 square foot facility located on a 23-acre campus adjacent to WKCTC was opened in 2014.

== Communities ==
=== City ===
- Paducah (county seat)

=== Census-designated places ===
- Farley (formerly Woodlawn-Oakdale)
- Hendron
- Massac
- Reidland

=== Unincorporated communities ===
- Camelia
- Cecil
- Cimota City
- Freemont
- Future City
- Grahamville
- Hardmoney
- Heath
- Hovekamp
- Krebs
- Lone Oak
- Maxon
- Melber (mostly in Graves County)
- Ragland
- Rossington
- Rudolph
- Saint Johns
- Sheehan Bridge
- West Paducah

== Politics ==
United States presidential election results for McCracken County, Kentucky
Year	Republican		Democratic		Third party(ies)	
Year	No.	%	No.	%	No.	%
1912	1,308	22.62%	2,948	50.99%	1,526	26.39%
1916	3,058	39.96%	4,356	56.92%	239	3.12%
1920	6,085	40.89%	8,496	57.10%	299	2.01%
1924	4,979	40.54%	6,028	49.08%	1,274	10.37%
1928	7,368	56.93%	5,535	42.76%	40	0.31%
1932	3,140	25.12%	9,188	73.51%	171	1.37%
1936	3,160	22.85%	10,557	76.33%	113	0.82%
1940	3,554	23.43%	11,562	76.23%	52	0.34%
1944	4,190	27.71%	10,846	71.73%	84	0.56%
1948	3,251	21.57%	11,183	74.19%	640	4.25%
1952	6,051	32.93%	12,302	66.95%	22	0.12%
1956	7,076	33.29%	14,103	66.34%	79	0.37%
1960	9,689	43.59%	12,539	56.41%	0	0.00%
1964	4,543	21.83%	16,178	77.75%	87	0.42%
1968	5,887	27.33%	9,741	45.21%	5,916	27.46%
1972	11,260	57.69%	7,567	38.77%	691	3.54%
1976	6,997	30.84%	14,956	65.92%	734	3.24%
1980	10,281	42.27%	13,365	54.94%	679	2.79%
1984	12,903	50.08%	12,535	48.65%	327	1.27%
1988	12,160	49.34%	12,208	49.54%	275	1.12%
1992	10,657	39.25%	13,341	49.13%	3,155	11.62%
1996	10,221	40.42%	12,670	50.10%	2,396	9.48%
2000	14,745	55.25%	11,412	42.76%	532	1.99%
2004	18,218	61.14%	11,361	38.13%	218	0.73%
2008	19,043	61.92%	11,285	36.69%	426	1.39%
2012	19,979	65.40%	10,062	32.94%	510	1.67%
2016	20,774	66.36%	9,134	29.18%	1,399	4.47%
2020	21,820	65.04%	11,195	33.37%	534	1.59%
2024	21,349	66.83%	10,191	31.90%	407	1.27%

=== Elected officials ===
Elected officials as of January 3, 2025
U.S. House	James Comer (R)	KY 1
Ky. Senate	Danny Carroll (R)	2
Ky. House	Steven Rudy (R)	1
Ky. House	Kim Holloway (R)	2
Ky. House	Randy Bridges (R)	3
Ky. House	Chris Freeland (R)	6

== See also ==
- National Register of Historic Places listings in McCracken County, Kentucky
