= Bielaski =

Bielaski is a surname. Notable people with the surname include:

- A. Bruce Bielaski (1883–1964), American lawyer and government official
- Alexander Bielaski (1811–1861), American civil engineer and Union Army captain
- Oscar Bielaski (1847–1911), American baseball player
- Ruth Shipley (born Ruth Bielaski; 1885–1966), American civil servant

== See also ==
- Bielski
