= Alexander Bielaski =

Engineer and Union Army officer

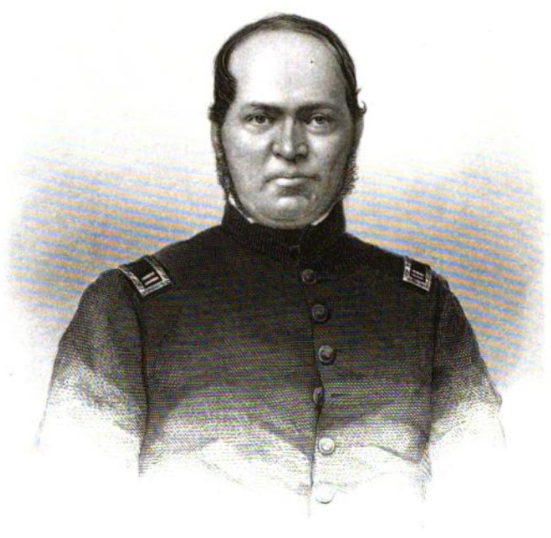
- Born: August 1, 1811; Minsk Governorate, Russian Empire
- Died: November 7, 1861 (aged 50) near Belmont, Missouri, U.S.
- Burial place: Mound City National Cemetery
- Spouse: Mary Ann Carey
- Children: Oscar Bielaski
- Relatives: A. Bruce Bielaski (grandson); Ruth Shipley (granddaughter)
- Military career
- Allegiance: Kingdom of Poland; United States
- Branch: Army of Poland; Union Army
- Rank: Captain
- Conflicts: November Uprising: Battle of Grochów; American Civil War: Battle of Belmont

Alexander Bielaski (August 1, 1811 – November 7, 1861) was an engineer and Union Army officer who was killed during the Battle of Belmont during the American Civil War. Born in the Minsk Governorate of the Russian Empire or elsewhere in the former Grand Duchy of Lithuania, Bielaski fought under Polish officer Henryk Dembiński during the November Uprising against the Russians in 1831. After suffering a disfiguring wound at the Battle of Grochów, he immigrated to the United States in 1832 and worked as an engineer and surveyor, including doing work for the Baltimore and Ohio Railroad and the Illinois Central Railroad. Bielaski was a friend of Abraham Lincoln, who gave him a commission in the Union Army when the American Civil War broke out in 1861. Serving as an aide to Brigadier General John A. McClernand, Bielaski was killed while leading the 27th Illinois Infantry Regiment in a charge at the Battle of Belmont.

== Early life ==
Alexander Bielaski was born either in the Minsk Governorate of the Russian Empire or elsewhere in the former Grand Duchy of Lithuania, on August 1, 1811. The modern historian Nathaniel C. Hughes describes him as Polish. Bielaski was trained as a topographical engineer in a Russian military academy at St. Petersburg and entered the Imperial Russian Army as an engineer. He joined the November Uprising, a revolt against the Russian Empire, in 1831. He served in a Polish army under Henryk Dembiński, under whom he once commanded a 300-man rear guard; his unit was wrecked by a Russian attack and Bielaski only returned to Polish headquarters with a single man. He was later shot in the mouth while fighting in the Battle of Grochów. The wound was disfiguring and destroyed several teeth. After the wound healed, Bielaski moved to Paris to work for the French government before immigrating to the United States in 1832.

Bielaski entered the United States at Portland, Maine, and entered the railroad industry. When he first reached the United States, he spoke no English, but some French; he eventually gained a proficiency in the use of English. After serving as a surveyor and engineer for the Baltimore and Ohio Railroad, he traveled to Florida for surveying work in 1835 before moving to Springfield, Illinois, in 1837. That same year, Bielaski befriended Abraham Lincoln. After surveying the Illinois Central Railroad, he was naturalized as a United States citizen in 1841. In July 1842, he married Springfield resident Mary Ann Carey, before moving to Mexico City in November 1842. Bielaski spent eighteen months in Mexico, where he was employed as an engineer and declined an offer of Mexican citizenship made by Santa Anna.

Returning to Illinois, he farmed for two years, but accepted an offer of employment with the United States General Land Office in 1845. Bielaski moved to Washington, D. C. for the position; by 1853, he had been promoted to a well-compensated position as a principal draftsman. After Lincoln was elected president, he would spend evenings sitting with Bielaski on the latter's porch. When the American Civil War began in 1861, Lincoln offered Bielaski a captain's commission to serve in the Union Army. Bielaski was initially reluctant to accept the offer because of his family, but was convinced to join the army by Lincoln. After joining the Union Army, he became an aide-de-camp for Brigadier General John A. McClernand.

== American Civil War ==
While serving as an aide to McClernand, Bielaski was concerned about the armament of the Union troops. McClernand's men were largely armed with flintlock muskets retooled to use percussion caps. Bielaski felt that the Union cavalry should be armed with lances, as were French and Austrian armies as well as the Cossacks. Early in the war, the Confederate States Army controlled the towns of Columbus, Kentucky, and Belmont, Missouri on opposite sides of the Mississippi River, giving them control of the river. Union Brigadier General Ulysses S. Grant wanted to contain the Confederate positions, and boarded men onto transport vessels on November 6, 1861. After learning that the Confederates were planning an offensive, Grant ordered the transports to attack the Confederate camp in Belmont. A position near Belmont was reached on November 7, and the Union troops began moving to attack the Confederates, who were commanded by Brigiader General Gideon Pillow.

While most of Grant's force encountered Pillow's Confederates, McClernand had detached the 27th Illinois Infantry Regiment, under the command of Colonel Napoleon Buford, to take a road to the Union right, and be in position on the other side of a slough from the main Union line. Bielaski accompanied Buford and the 27th Illinois Infantry during the movement. During the march, Buford learned that by abandoning his original directions and heading further down the road, he could strike the Confederates in the rear of their position. Buford decided to make the movement against the Confederate rear; the historian Nathaniel Cheairs Hughes believes that Bielaski supported the decision. After turning onto a plank road and later making another turn, the 27th Illinois Infantry Regiment reached a point within 0.25 miles (0.40 km) of the Confederate camp, where the trees surrounding the camp had been cut down to form abatis. Bielaski had helped make the decisions about which roads to take during the movement.

The 27th Illinois Infantry then charged the Confederate line, which was held in that sector by Company A of the 13th Tennessee Infantry Regiment. Confederate fire initially disrupted the Union line, but Bielaski rallied the men and took part in the charge. He was first shot in the hand, and was then forced to dismount from his horse after the animal was wounded in the neck. After firing several shots with a musket he picked up on the field, Bielaski grabbed the regiment's battle flag and led the charge. Carrying the flag made him a target, though, and he was killed during the attack. Hughes states that he was killed by a bullet to the head, while Joseph A. Wytrwał, writing for Polish American Studies, attributes his death to a cannonball. A contemporary newspaper report stated that he "fell mutilated by cannon bullets". Union Colonel John A. Logan stated "a braver man never fell on the field of battle" when writing about Bielaski's death in his action report, and McClernand also noted his bravery. Grant's men were initially able to capture the Confederate camp, but Pillow received reinforcements from Columbus and counterattacked, driving the Union soldiers from the field. Bielaski was buried in a mass grave until his remains were disinterred in 1864 and transferred to the Mound City National Cemetery in Illinois. His grave is marked as "Unknown Soldier, killed at the Battle of Belmont".

== Family ==
Bielaski was the father of Oscar Bielaski, who was one of the first Polish-Americans to play professional baseball in the United States. Through his other son, Alexander, Bielaski was the grandfather of A. Bruce Bielaski, who served as director of what became the Federal Bureau of Investigation from 1912 to 1919. Ruth Shipley was A. Bruce's sister and Bielaski's granddaughter; she served as the head of the passport division of the United States Department of State for 27 years.

== Sources ==
- Cadzow, John F. (1978). Lithuanian Americans and their communities of Cleveland (PDF). Cleveland State University. OCLC 4725349.
- Hughes, Nathaniel Cheairs (1991). The Battle of Belmont: Grant Strikes South. Chapel Hill, North Carolina: University of North Carolina Press. ISBN 0-8078-1968-9.
- Kahn, Jeffrey (2013). Mrs. Shipley's Ghost: The Right to Travel and Terror Watchlists (ebook ed.). Ann Arbor, Michigan: University of Michigan Press. ISBN 978-0-472-02883-2.
- Kennedy, Frances H., ed. (1998). The Civil War Battlefield Guide (2nd ed.). Boston/New York: Houghton Mifflin. ISBN 978-0-395-74012-5.
- Pula, James S. (2011). "Bruce Bielaski and the Origin of the FBI" (PDF). Polish American Studies. 68 (1): 43–57. doi:10.2307/41289314. JSTOR 41289314. S2CID 254433629.
- Shea, John Gilmary (1872). A Child's History of the United States. Vol. 2. New York, New York: McMenamy, Hess & Company. OCLC 10468201.
- Wytrwał, Joseph A. (1957). "Lincoln's Friend: Captain A. Bielaski" (PDF). Polish American Studies. 14 (3/4): 65–67. JSTOR 20147452.
