= Mound City National Cemetery =

Historic veterans cemetery in Pulaski County, Illinois

- U.S. National Register of Historic Places
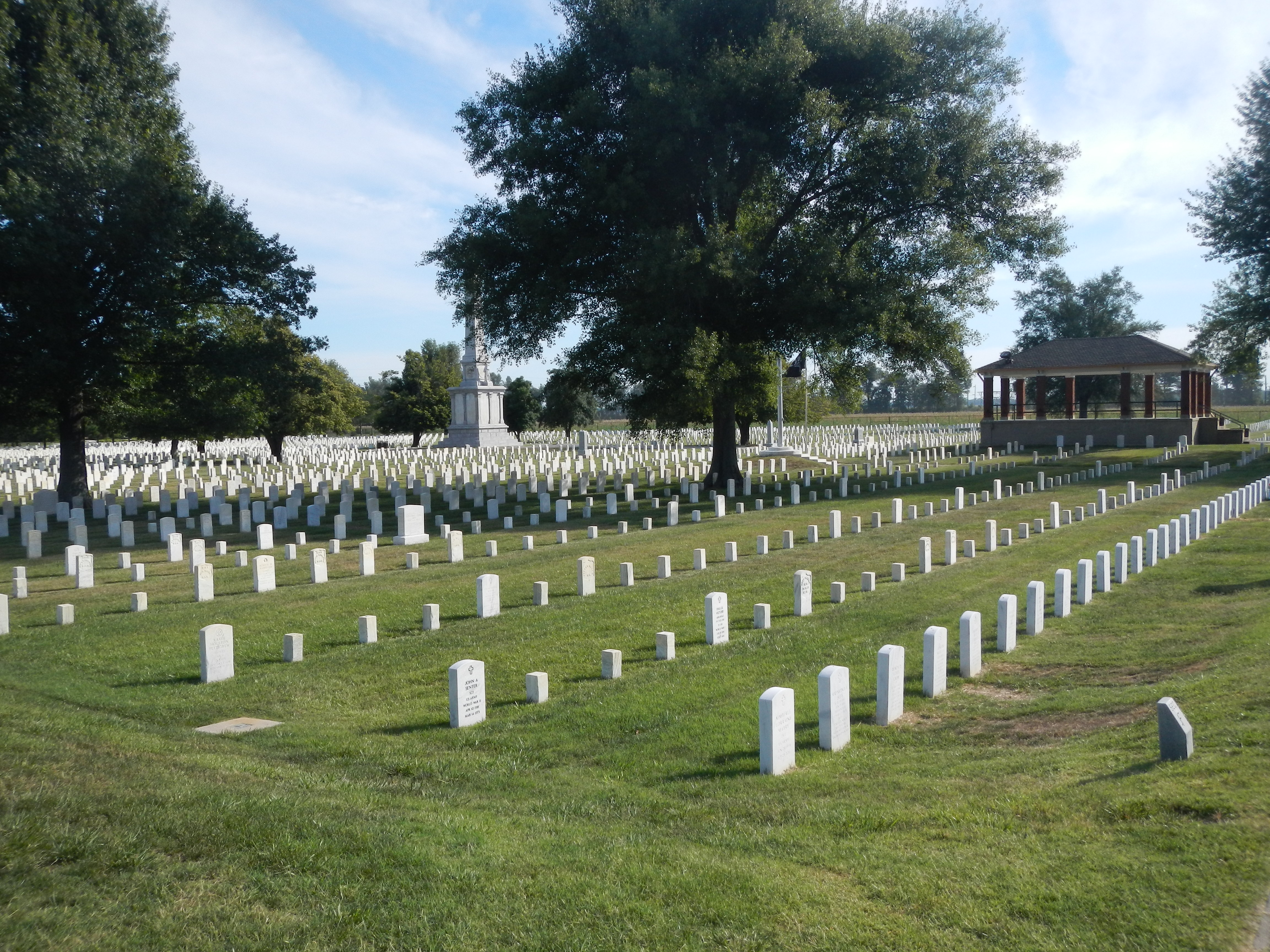

- Location within Illinois
- Location: Jct. of IL 37 and US 51, Mound City, Illinois
- Coordinates: 37°05′17″N 89°10′40″W
- Built: 1864
- Architect: Montgomery C. Meigs
- Architectural style: Queen Anne
- MPS: MPL020 – Civil War Era National Cemeteries
- NRHP reference No.: 97001174
- Added to NRHP: October 8, 1997

Mound City National Cemetery is a United States National Cemetery located near Mound City, in Pulaski County, Illinois. It encompasses 10.5 acres (4.2 ha), and as of the end of 2005, had 8,098 interments. Administered by the United States Department of Veterans Affairs, it is managed by the Jefferson Barracks National Cemetery. This cemetery is listed on the National Register of Historic Places.

== History ==
During the American Civil War, Mound City was the site of the Mound City Civil War Naval Hospital. The cemetery was used to inter both Union and Confederate soldiers who died while under care at the hospital. After it was officially declared a National Cemetery in 1864, several nearby battlefield cemeteries arranged to have their remains reinterred there.

Mound City National Cemetery was listed in the National Register of Historic Places in 1997.

== Notable monuments ==
- The Illinois State Soldiers and Sailors Monument, a marble monument erected in 1874.

== Notable burials ==
- John Basil Turchin (1821–1901), Russian-born, United States Civil War Union Army brigadier general.
- Alexander Bielaski (1811–1861), Polish-born United States Civil War Union Army officer killed at Battle of Belmont; father of Oscar Bielaski, the first Polish-American Major League Baseball player, and grandfather of Alexander Bruce Bielaski, second Director of the Bureau of Investigation (FBI).
