= Gideon Johnson Pillow =

Confederate States Army general

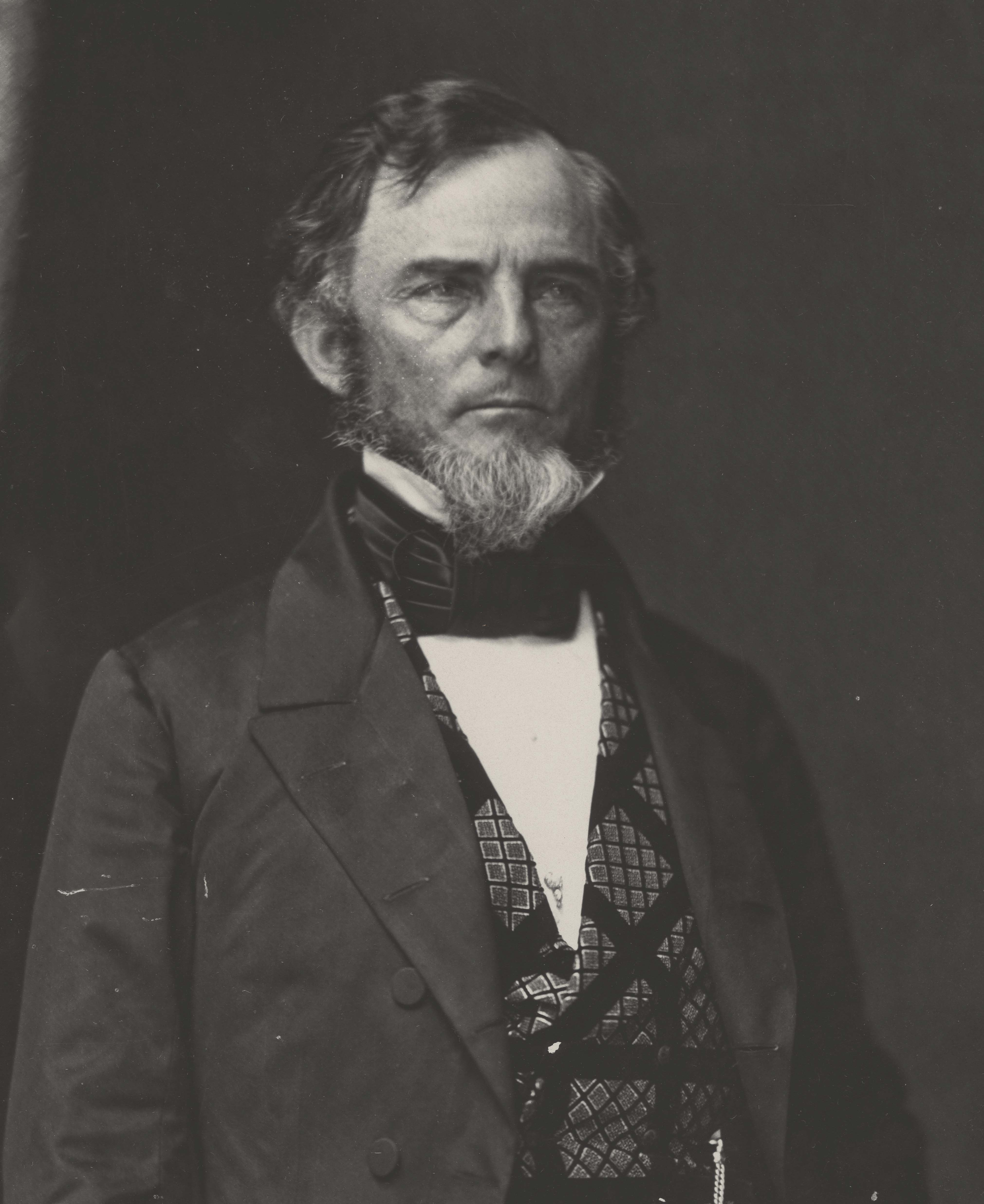
- Born: June 8, 1806; Williamson County, Tennessee, U.S.
- Died: October 8, 1878 (aged 72); Phillips County, Arkansas, U.S.
- Burial place: Elmwood Cemetery, Memphis, Tennessee, U.S.
- Education: University of Nashville
- Military career
- Allegiance: United States; Confederate States
- Branch: United States Army; Confederate States Army
- Service years: 1846–1848 (U.S.); 1861 (Tenn.); 1861–1865 (C.S.)
- Rank: Major-General (U.S.); Major-General (Tenn.); Brigadier-General (C.S.)
- Battles: Mexican–American War; Battle of Cerro Gordo; Battle of Chapultepec; American Civil War; Battle of Belmont; Battle of Fort Donelson; Battle of Stones River

Gideon Johnson Pillow Jr. (June 8, 1806 – October 8, 1878) was a senior officer of the Confederate States Army in the Western Theater of the American Civil War, having previously served as a general of United States Volunteers during the Mexican–American War. Before his military career, Pillow practiced law and was active in Democratic Party politics. He was a floor leader in support of the nomination of fellow Tennessean James K. Polk at the 1844 Democratic National Convention. In 1847, Pillow was commissioned a brigadier general of volunteers to serve in the Mexican–American War, where he was wounded at Cerro Gordo and Chapultepec and later promoted to major general, even when his superiors were unimpressed with his lack of military knowledge and his tendency to modify battle plans to the detriment of operations. However, controversy arose when, in a series of letters, Pillow tried to take what was perceived by some as undue credit for American victories at the expense of his commander, Major General Winfield Scott. Pillow was court-martialed for insubordination, but with President Polk's assistance, the court-martial was reduced to a court of inquiry, which in 1848 exonerated Pillow.

After the war, Pillow served as a delegate to the Nashville Convention of 1850, where he supported compromise. He remained active in supporting the Democratic Party. At the start of the Civil War in 1861, Pillow supported secession, and was commissioned a brigadier general in the Confederate Army in July. Pillow received the thanks of the Confederate Congress for driving off the Union force at the Battle of Belmont, Missouri.

Pillow controversially failed to exploit a temporary breakthrough of Union lines by his troops which might have allowed the Confederate garrison of Fort Donelson to escape at the Battle of Fort Donelson on February 15, 1862. The next night, before the surrender of the fort, Brigadier General John B. Floyd passed overall command of the fort to Pillow, who in turn passed it to Brigadier General Simon Buckner. Floyd and Pillow managed to personally escape with a few aides before Buckner surrendered the remaining garrison to the Union Army of Brigadier General Ulysses S. Grant. These actions sent his military career and reputation into decline.

Pillow commanded a brigade at the Battle of Stones River in 1863, where he performed poorly, and was among the few generals in the army to praise the leadership of commanding General Braxton Bragg. Removed from combat duty, he worked mainly in recruiting assignments through the remainder of the war. Bankrupt after the war, Pillow recovered financially and resumed a successful legal career. He died near Helena, Arkansas, in 1878; initially buried in Helena, Pillow was later reinterred at Elmwood Cemetery in Memphis.

== Early life and education ==
Pillow was born on June 8, 1806, in Williamson County, Tennessee, to Gideon Pillow and Ann Payne Pillow.

He came from a well connected, property owning family with a reputation for Indian fighting and loyalty to Andrew Jackson. He graduated from the University of Nashville in 1827 and practiced law in Columbia, Tennessee, where he became friends with future President James K. Polk. Pillow married Mary Elizabeth Martin, March 24, 1831.

In 1831, Tennessee Governor William Carroll, a cousin who had been one of Jackson's lieutenants, appointed Pillow as district attorney general. Pillow served as a brigadier general in the Tennessee Militia from 1833 to 1836. Pillow played "an important role" in the 1844 Democratic Party convention which nominated Polk for president, although Pillow exaggerated his contribution to the exclusion of other prominent Polk supporters.

== Early military career ==
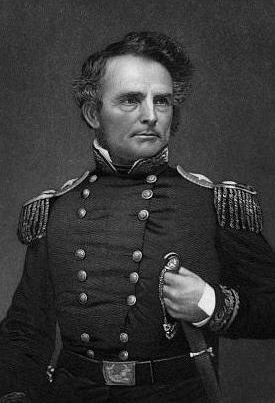
Pillow in uniform, c. 1846

Carroll appointed Pillow Tennessee's adjutant general in 1833, commissioning him a brigadier general. Pillow treated the position as largely ceremonial, the first in a path to higher office he hoped to attain. He stepped down after three years to return to practicing law. He bought the Clifton Place plantation near Columbia, which he eventually developed into one of the largest estates in the state, increasing his political influence. In 1844, he helped James K. Polk secure the Democratic nomination for president, which Polk won.

== Mexican War ==
When the Mexican–American War began shortly afterwards, Polk appointed Pillow brigadier general in the United States Volunteers, largely to keep an eye on Zachary Taylor and Winfield Scott, both political rivals of Polk's. In Mexico, Pillow's superiors, many of them West Point graduates trained as career soldiers, were unimpressed by the minimal training and experience he had despite his high rank, as a citizen soldier. Assigned to Robert Patterson's encampment in Lomita, where he commanded the Second Brigade of the Second Division of Tennessee volunteers, one of his first orders canceled daytime guard duty, a popular move with the troops but a potential major security lapse. He also proposed a reorganization of the troops so divisive that Taylor had to personally resolve tensions. In another move that was associated with him for years afterwards, after ordering his troops to dig a ditch around their encampment, had them put the earth on the wrong side of the ditch, making it useless for defensive purposes. William B. Campbell, a colonel in the First Tennessee and later governor of Tennessee, said Pillow's was "one of the smallest capacity elevated to so high a command."

Taylor, who described Pillow as having "much to learn" about military matters, left him and his troops behind when he later marched on Monterrey early in 1847. They saw some minor skirmishes during the Siege of Veracruz. Pillow made another widely noted misstep one night early in the battle when he ordered half of a company of Pennsylvania volunteers to stand guard on one side of a road while the others slept across from them, a formation that would likely have resulted in heavy casualties had the unit been attacked, leading even privates to hold his generalship in low esteem. At the Battle of Cerro Gordo, Pillow disregarded orders and chose a more direct route up one of the ridges where the Mexicans under Antonio López de Santa Anna were positioned. His troops had less cover and had to ascend in single file. The Mexicans opened fire upon seeing them, forcing Pillow to attack the wrong position and ruining Scott's plan to have Pillow's troops serve as a diversionary force for the main U.S. attack. Attempting to get some clarification on how to regroup during the ensuing chaotic retreat, George McClellan found Pillow, his commander, hiding behind a bush in the rear when an errant canister wounded Pillow's arm, forcing him to retreat even further for medical attention, where he berated his subordinates for their failure to properly support him. Pillow sent McClellan to ask Scott for reinforcements, which were unavailable. When he returned, the Mexicans on the ridges had surrendered as Santa Anna had abandoned them in his retreat.

When Pillow returned to Tennessee to heal his arm afterwards, he was harshly criticized by others who had fought under him at Cerro Gordo. He published his own account of the battle, reflecting favorably on him. Pillow was promoted to major general shortly afterwards, primarily because he was to return to Mexico, and Polk wanted him to continue monitoring Scott's actions. Pillow believed the promotion was due to the military prowess he had displayed.

Pillow rejoined U.S. forces as they made their final drive towards Mexico City. He again disobeyed superior orders to avoid battle after cutting a road through the lava field at Padierna resulting in the Battle of Contreras. Scott came to the battlefield and found Pillow a mile and a half (2.4 km) from his troops. That evening Pillow admitted to Scott that he had lost track of where his troops were, and Scott ordered Pillow to remain at headquarters the next day while Persifor Frazer Smith led the action that won the battle for the U.S.

For the remainder of the Battle for Mexico City, Pillow began differing with Scott's plans. He opposed the attack on Molino del Rey, and after the cannon foundry Scott believed was there turned out not to be, Pillow sent a private letter to Polk questioning Scott's judgement. Pillow also resisted his assignment to attack Chapultepec from the west, believing it would expose his troops to higher casualties while letting other commanders take the credit, an objection that held little sway with Scott. Early in the next day's fighting, he was wounded in the ankle, putting him out of action for what was effectively the rest of the war.

During the war he came into conflict with Scott. Pillow refused Scott's request that Pillow revise his exaggerated battle reports in which he took credit for the American victories at Contreras and Churubusco. Then, a letter written by Pillow under the pseudonym "Leonidas", published in the New Orleans Delta in September 1847, wrongfully credited Pillow with the victories at Contreras, including the plan of battle and command of all the forces engaged, and Churubusco. (Note: Colonel James Duncan and Brigadier General William J. Worth also exaggerated their roles in the successful campaign and arranged for publication of accounts that claimed credit, leading to Scott's charges against them as well as Pillow. Johnson, 1998, p. 210. Worth, however, was technically innocent of Scott's accusation that he violated regulations and was insubordinate. Eisenhower, 1997, p. 312.) When Pillow's intrigue was exposed, he was arrested by Scott and held for court-martial for insubordination and violating regulations, along with Colonel James Duncan and Brigadier General William J. Worth.

Pillow wrote to President Polk about Scott's involvement in a bribery scheme proposed by Mexican leader Santa Anna for his help in ending the war without further bloodshed. Polk relieved Scott of command by a letter of February 18, 1848. Polk reduced the proceedings against Pillow, Duncan and Worth from a court martial to a court of inquiry which had no criminal implications and added that Pillow could question Scott about the bribery scheme. Polk and Secretary of War William L. Marcy chose the three members of the court for their hostility to Scott.

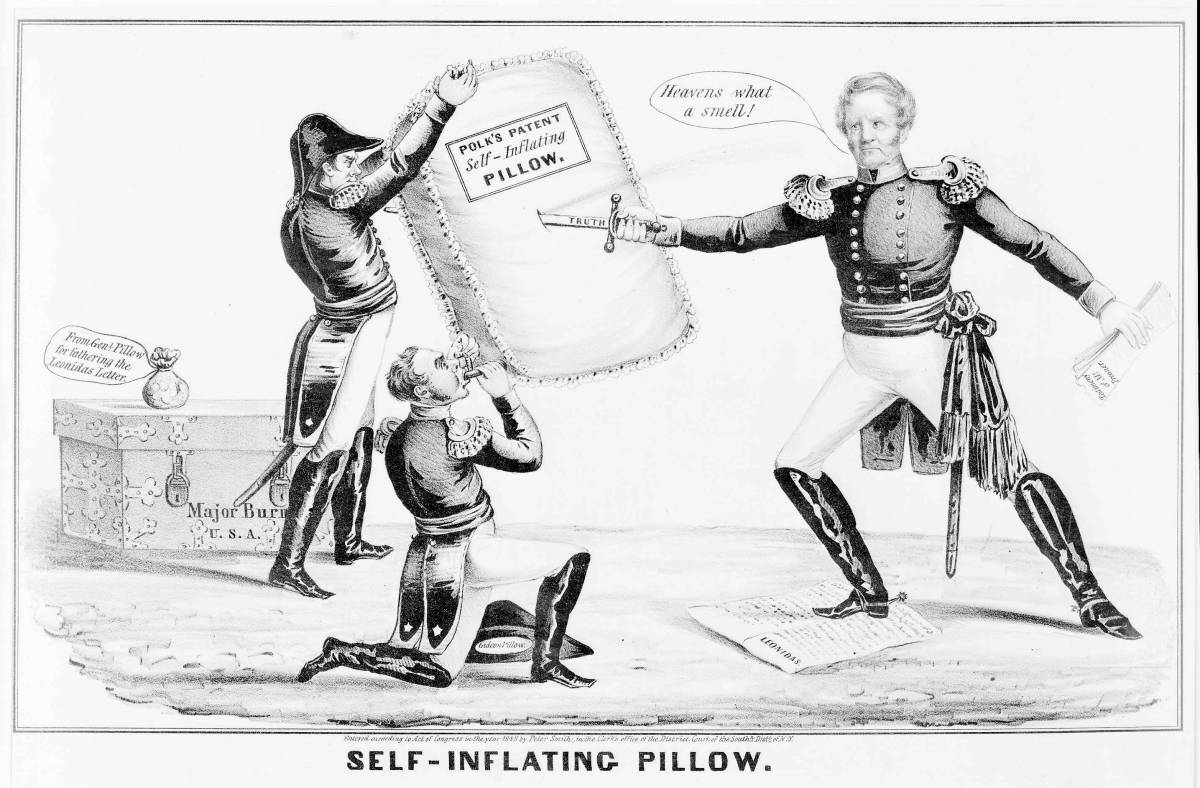
1840s newspaper cartoon depicting Pillow's self-promoting attempts to discredit Mexican–American War commander General Winfield Scott-a pun of Pillow's name

Proceedings began in March 1848 in Mexico City. Major Archibald W. Burns, a paymaster and Pillow protege, claimed authorship of the "Leonidas" letter, at Pillow's behest. When the court of inquiry took as much testimony as they could in Mexico City it reconvened in Frederick, Maryland. Scott left Mexico City the next day. The court reconvened in June with Scott ill. Scott dropped the charges against Worth and Duncan and Pillow was exonerated when the court announced their findings on July 1, 1848. Scott resumed his duties as general-in-chief of the army early that month. While the affair had cost Pillow politically, it benefited Polk by ending Scott's presidential aspirations.

Pillow was discharged from the United States Volunteers in July. In early 1849, two other courts of inquiry cleared Pillow of any misconduct during the war. Pillow assisted Roswell S. Ripley in writing The war with Mexico.

In his memoirs, Scott wrote that Pillow was "amiable and possessed of some acuteness, but the only person I have ever known who was wholly indifferent in the choice between truth and falsehood, honesty and dishonesty:—ever as ready to attain an end by the one as the other, and habitually boastful of acts of cleverness at the total sacrifice of moral character."

On the other hand, Pillow's friend and patron, President Polk, stated after the court of inquiry was closed: "General Pillow is a gallant and highly meritorious officer, and has been greatly persecuted by General Scott, for no other reason than that he is a Democrat in his politics and was supposed to be my personal and political friend."

=== Interbellum career ===
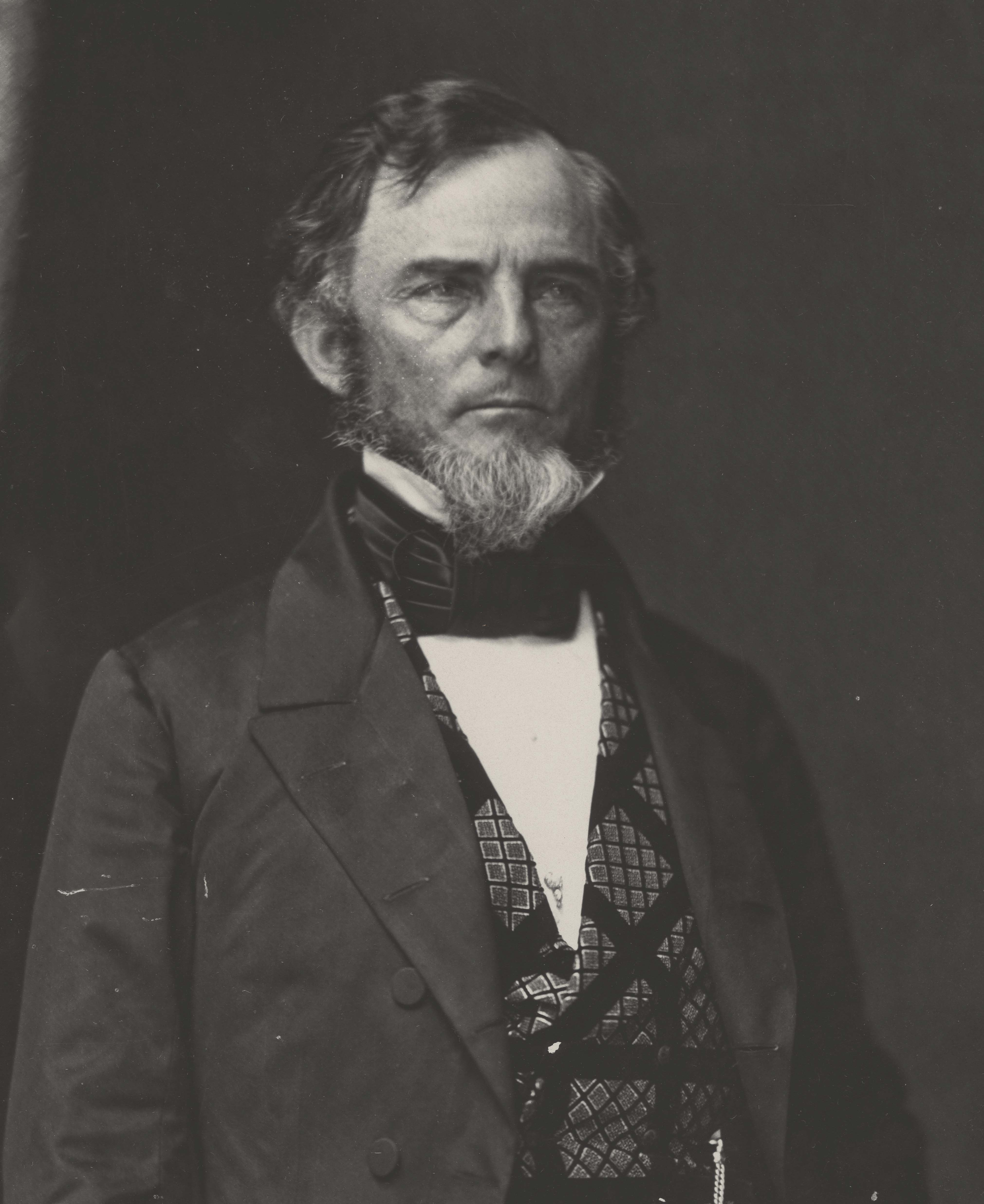
Antebellum portrait

Pillow was a Tennessee delegate to the 1850 Nashville Convention, which met to consider possible courses of action if the federal government decided to ban slavery in territories acquired and organized as part of Westward Expansion and the Mexican–American War. Pillow supported compromise, opposing delegates who favored nullification and secession. He declined to run to succeed Carroll as governor of Tennessee since his time in Mexico had left his business affairs in such disarray that he did not believe himself capable of giving the job his full attention. Instead, he expanded his landholdings into Arkansas and Mississippi.

Pillow's antagonism for Scott was reflected in the 1852 election for president, when he opposed Scott and supported Franklin Pierce. Pillow attempted to win the vice presidential nomination, but was not taken seriously, and it went to William R. King. He intended to be a candidate for vice president in 1856. Instead, he supported his brother-in-law Aaron V. Brown, who lost that nomination to John C. Breckinridge.

With sentiment in the South increasingly in favor of secession, Pillow was one of the region's few supporters of James Buchanan in 1856. However, Buchanan did not see fit to reward Pillow with a position in his administration following his victory. The following year, Pillow tried unsuccessfully to secure the Democratic nomination for a seat in the United States Senate from Tennessee.

Pillow supported the candidacy of Stephen A. Douglas in the presidential election of 1860, despite being publicly critical of the Democratic nominee. With the election of Abraham Lincoln as president, Pillow ultimately came to support secession as the will of the majority in Tennessee, although he remained personally opposed.

Pillow's political failures were in contrast to his continuing business success. In addition to his law practice and management of the family farm, Pillow engaged in highly profitable land speculation. By 1860, he was one of the largest landholders in the South and possibly the wealthiest man in Tennessee.

== American Civil War ==
Pillow joined the Confederacy just after the start of the American Civil War. Tennessee Governor Isham G. Harris appointed Pillow as the senior major general in the Tennessee Militia and commander of the Provisional Army of Tennessee as of May 9, 1861. Green worked closely with Harris to develop a regional munitions industry and to create the structure that would become the Army of Tennessee. In July 1861, he was appointed brigadier general in the Confederate States Army and was given command of the unit that was briefly called the "Army of Liberation". Pillow felt disrespected by his rank since other veterans of the Mexican War had been commissioned into the Confederate Army with at least the rank they had attained during that conflict; he was oblivious to his low reputation among other veteran officers and believed himself to be a skilled military leader.

Pillow soon came under the command of Major General Leonidas Polk and General Albert Sidney Johnston in the Western Theater. Polk ordered him to lead a force into Kentucky on September 3, 1861, violating Kentucky's declared "neutrality" and provoking the State and the majority of its citizens to adhere to the Union.

=== Belmont ===
Pillow's first combat of the war was against Union Army Brigadier General Ulysses S. Grant, also in his first battle, at Belmont, Missouri, in November. Grant crossed the Mississippi River from Cairo, Illinois, on the night of November 6, 1861, to keep Confederate forces occupied in Missouri while Major General John C. Fremont tried to maintain control of the western part of the state. Grant decided to attack the small Confederate Camp Johnston at Belmont, Missouri across the river from the Confederate fort at Columbus, Kentucky. Pillow, who had left the area with 5,000 men for Clarksville, Tennessee, a few hours earlier, was recalled by Polk to confront the attackers.

Failing to take full advantage of a superior position, Pillow ordered an assault on the Union force through the woods, giving the Union troops cover from which to push back the Confederates. Then the Union troops turned to the camp to pillage and celebrate, which Grant attempted to stop by burning the camp. Pillow, assisted by Brigadier General Benjamin F. Cheatham, reorganized the Confederates and counterattacked. The disorganized Union soldiers fled for their gunboats, leaving the 27th Illinois Volunteer Infantry Regiment behind, only to be rescued by boats sent back for that purpose.

Both sides claimed the battle, seen today as inconclusive, as a victory: the Confederates because the Union force withdrew across the river under fire; Grant because he had achieved both his objectives. The Confederate force of about 5,000 men and the Union force of about 3,100 men suffered about the same number of casualties and the armies returned to their original positions. Nevertheless, Pillow and his command were voted the Thanks of the Confederate Congress on December 6, 1861:

... for the desperate courage they exhibited in sustaining for several hours, and under most disadvantageous circumstances, an attack by a force of the enemy greatly superior to their own, both in numbers and appointments; and for the skill and gallantry by which they converted what at first threatened so much disaster, into a triumphant victory.

=== Fort Donelson ===
Pillow resigned from the Army on December 28, 1861, in a dispute with Major General Leonidas Polk, but he soon realized that this was a rash decision and was able to cancel his resignation by obtaining an order from Confederate President Jefferson Davis on February 2, 1862. When he returned, under direct command of General Albert Sidney Johnston rather than under Polk, he was given command at Clarksville, Tennessee. Without permission, Pillow began to forward men and supplies to Fort Donelson, a crucial installation protecting the Cumberland River. On February 9, Pillow was briefly assigned to command at Fort Donelson and began to make improvements. Three additional brigadier generals were assigned to the fort soon thereafter. One, John B. Floyd, former governor of Virginia and Secretary of War under James Buchanan, outranked Pillow, who found himself displaced as commander and put in the unofficial position of second-in-command.

On February 12, 1862, Union forces under the command of Brigadier General Grant began to arrive near Fort Donelson. On the night of February 14, Floyd and his subordinate commanders decided to try to break out of the fort and escape a likely Union siege before the full Union force could arrive. Pillow set forth a plan to surprise the Union force which was accepted. Floyd gave no orders concerning the details of the operations, including the evacuation and order of march, in order to exploit any breakthrough.

As the Battle of Fort Donelson continued into February 15, 1862, under Floyd's order, Pillow took control from the general who was in formal command of the left wing of the army, Brigadier General Bushrod Johnson, who continued to ably assist Pillow. Pillow led this wing in a surprise assault with the intention of opening an escape route to relieve the besieged Confederate forces in the fort. Although the assault against the division of Brigadier General John A. McClernand was initially successful, Pillow inexplicably decided to pull his men from their advance positions and back into the trenches so that they could be resupplied before their escape, squandering the advances they had fought for so hard that morning. Floyd and the other generals were furious with Pillow, but it was too late to correct his error, especially because Floyd and Pillow saw Union troop movements and heard false reports about the arrival of substantial Union Army reinforcements. Floyd then panicked and ordered all troops back to their trenches. The Union force then retook the lost ground and the outer defenses of the fort.

At a council of war early on the morning of February 16, the generals agreed to surrender their army. Floyd, who feared prosecution for treason if he should be captured, turned command of the army over to Pillow, who had similar concerns and immediately passed command to Simon Bolivar Buckner, who had argued that the Confederate position was untenable. Believing the garrison could hold out long enough to be evacuated by river transport, Pillow still wanted to fight. He finally agreed with the other generals to surrender the fort and garrison, but not himself personally. Pillow did ask cavalry commander Nathan Bedford Forrest, who was determined to escape with his command, to lead Pillow's brigade out as well. Pillow escaped in the night in a small boat across the Cumberland River; Floyd likewise escaped, taking two regiments of his Virginia command with him before Buckner could surrender to Grant. Forrest inquired of Floyd about Pillow's whereabouts and was told he had already retreated and Forrest was free to follow his own course.

Some historians have judged Ulysses S. Grant as being too rash in his haste to assault Fort Donelson without possessing overwhelming superiority. However, his acquaintance with Gideon Pillow played a key factor in his confidence. As he wrote in his memoirs,

I had known General Pillow in Mexico, and judged that with any force, no matter how small, I could march up to within gunshot of any intrenchments he was given to hold. I said this to the officers of my staff at the time. I knew that Floyd was in command, but he was no soldier, and I judged that he would yield to Pillow's pretensions.

...

General Pillow, next in command, was conceited, and prided himself much on his services in the Mexican war. He telegraphed to General Johnston, at Nashville, after our men were within the rebel rifle-pits, and almost on the eve of his making his escape, that the Southern troops had had great success all day.

Grant also recalled that, following the surrender of Fort Donelson, he met with his old friend Buckner, who told him of Pillow's escape. At the Confederate council of war the night before, the vain Pillow had expressed concern that his capture would be a disaster for the Southern cause.

"He thought you'd rather get hold of him than any other man in the Southern Confederacy," Buckner told Grant.

"Oh," replied Grant, "if I had got him, I'd let him go again. He will do us more good commanding you fellows."

=== Reassignment ===
Pillow assumed command of the 3rd Division of the Army of Central Kentucky, but was suspended from command by order of Jefferson Davis on April 16 for "grave errors in judgement in the military operations which resulted in the surrender of the army" (at Fort Donelson). Pillow resigned October 21, 1862, but Confederate President Jefferson Davis rescinded the resignation and restored Pillow to command on December 10, 1862. He commanded a brigade in Major General John C. Breckinridge's division of the Army of Tennessee, commanded by General Braxton Bragg, during the third day at the Battle of Stones River, January 2, 1863, arriving on the battlefield just an hour before Breckinridge's assault. Breckinridge was furious to find Pillow cowering behind a tree and ordered him forward. After the battle, Pillow was one of the few Confederate officers to speak in favor of General Bragg's battlefield decisions, denigrating Breckinridge's execution of the ill-fated assault.

Pillow commanded the Volunteer and Conscription Bureau of the Army of Tennessee and related recruiting assignments starting January 16, 1863. Although he had no combat assignments after Stones River, he had a short and unsuccessful field command in June 1864 when he was assigned to disrupt Major General William Tecumseh Sherman's communications between Chattanooga, Tennessee, and Atlanta, Georgia, during the Atlanta campaign. After his loss at the Battle of LaFayette, he resumed recruiting assignments, where he served out the remainder of the war. He was the Commissary General of Prisoners for the Confederacy starting in February after the death of Brigadier General John H. Winder. He was captured by Union forces at Union Springs, Alabama, in April, and was paroled in Montgomery the next month. President Andrew Johnson pardoned him in August.

== Later life ==
After the American Civil War, Pillow was forced into bankruptcy, but embarked on a successful law practice in Memphis, Tennessee, as partner with former Governor Isham G. Harris. He died October 8, 1878, at age 72 near Helena, Arkansas, in Phillips County, during that year's yellow fever epidemic. Initially buried at Helena, Pillow was reinterred in Elmwood Cemetery, Memphis.

== Honors ==
Fort Pillow, site of the controversial 1864 battle of Fort Pillow, was named for him.

== See also ==
- List of Confederate generals
- List of people pardoned or granted clemency by the president of the United States
