= Ruth Shipley =

United States civil servant (1885 - 1966)

Ruth B. Shipley
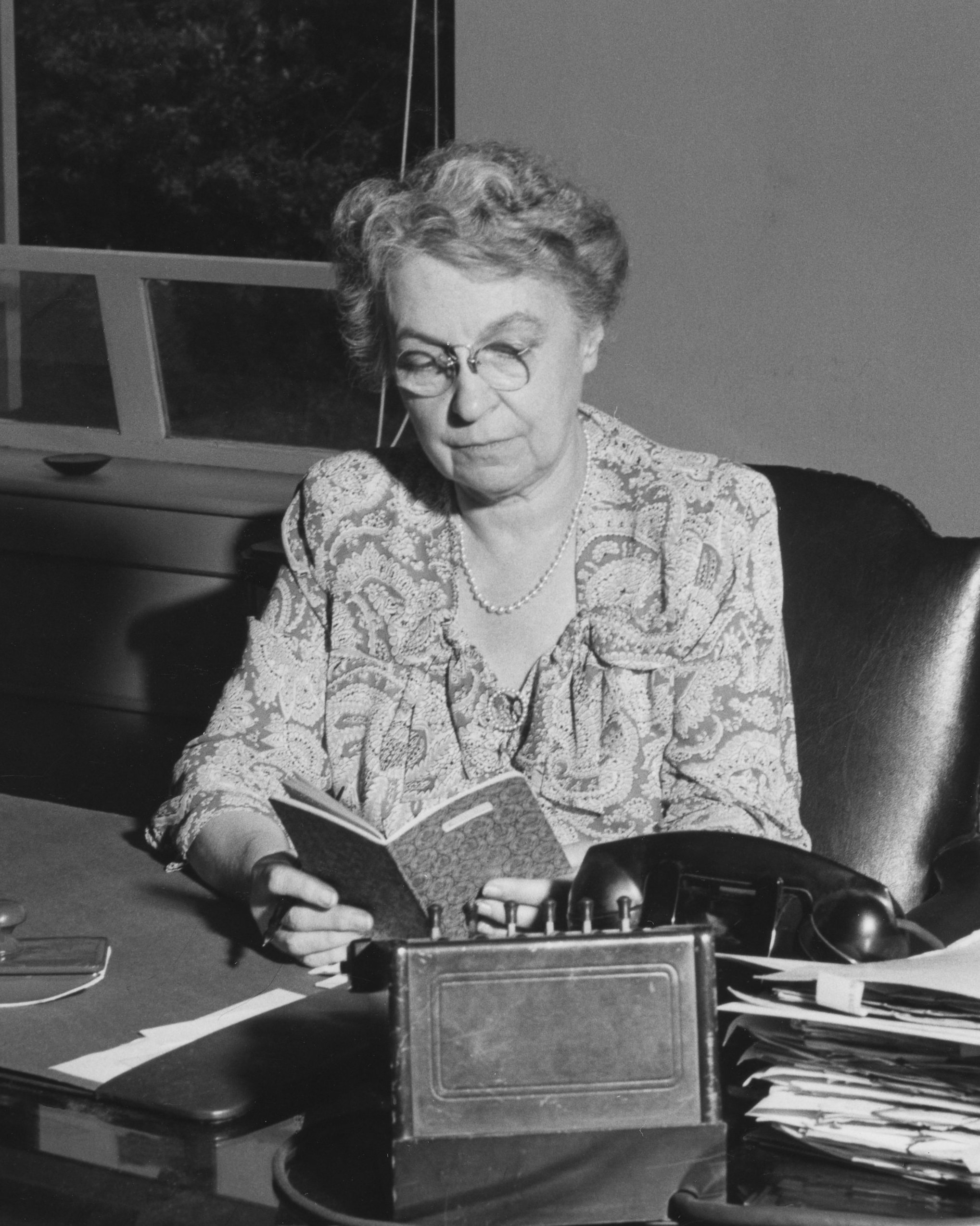
- Born: Ruth Bielaski; April 20, 1885; Montgomery County, Maryland, U.S.
- Died: November 3, 1966 (aged 81); Washington, D.C., U.S.
- Employer: United States Department of State
- Children: 1
- Relatives: Alexander Bielaski (grandfather); Oscar Bielaski (uncle); A. Bruce Bielaski (brother)

Ruth Bielaski Shipley (April 20, 1885 – November 3, 1966) was an American government employee who served as the head of the Passport Division of the United States Department of State for 27 years, from 1928 to 1955. Her decisions to refuse passports were widely seen as undemocratic, dictatorial, whimsical and often personal.

== Early life and education ==
Shipley was born Ruth Bielaski on April 20, 1885, in Montgomery County, Maryland, the daughter of a Methodist minister. She attended high school in Washington, D.C., and took the civil service examination after graduating.

== Career ==
Shipley first worked for the United States Patent and Trademark Office beginning in 1908. She joined the State Department on August 25, 1914. In 1924, she became assistant chief of the Office of Coordination and Review.

=== Passport Division ===
She became head of the Passport Division in 1928, the first woman to hold the position, after twice declining the appointment. She succeeded foreign service officer Parker Wilson Buhrman and initially headed a staff of more than 70. In 1930, she joined the United States delegation to the Hague conference on the codification of international law. Three years later, she led a successful campaign over the objections of some at the State Department, to prevent a magazine's advertising campaign from using the word "passport" to identify its promotional literature. She believed it "cheapened...the high plane to which a passport had been raised."

In 1937, she altered the Passport Division's policies and began issuing passports in a married woman's maiden name alone if she requested it, no longer followed by the phrase "wife of". She noted that the passports of married men never carried "husband of" as further identification.

The Neutrality Act of 1939 restricted travel by American citizens to certain areas and forbade transport on the ships of nations involved in hostilities. Shipley reviewed every application personally and the number of passports issued fell from 75,000 monthly in 1930 to 2,000. She also oversaw the issuance of new passports to all citizens abroad and the incorporation of new anti-counterfeiting measures into their design.

In 1945, Fortune called her "redoubtable" and in 1951 Time described her as "the most invulnerable, most unfirable, most feared and most admired career woman in Government." That same year Reader's Digest wrote that: "No American can go abroad without her authorization. She decides whether the applicant is entitled to a passport and also whether he would be a hazard to Uncle Sam's security or create prejudice against the United States by unbecoming conduct."

In 1942, she was criticized for issuing a passport to a Polish-American Catholic priest who visited Joseph Stalin to plead for a democratic post-war Poland. Her decision was defended by President Roosevelt. By the end of World War II, her staff included more than 200 employees.

Because of her personal role in issuing passports, many important figures corresponded with and met with her to document their reasons for travel abroad, including W. E. B. Du Bois, playwright Lillian Hellman, and Manhattan Project physicist Martin David Kamen.

Upon her retirement, an editorial in the New York Times attributed her reputation for "arbitrary" decision to the fact that she had to enforce newly restrictive government policies. Despite the conflict between individual freedom and government policies, it said, "there was never any doubt that Mrs. Shipley did her duty as she saw it."

She retired on April 30, 1955, when she reached the mandatory retirement age of 70. She said that she chose her successor, Frances G. Knight, herself. The State Department awarded her its Distinguished Service Medal upon retirement. Her decisions to withhold issuance of great numbers of passports were seen as arbitrary, and her actions presented unwarranted difficulties impeding the travel of many U.S. citizens.

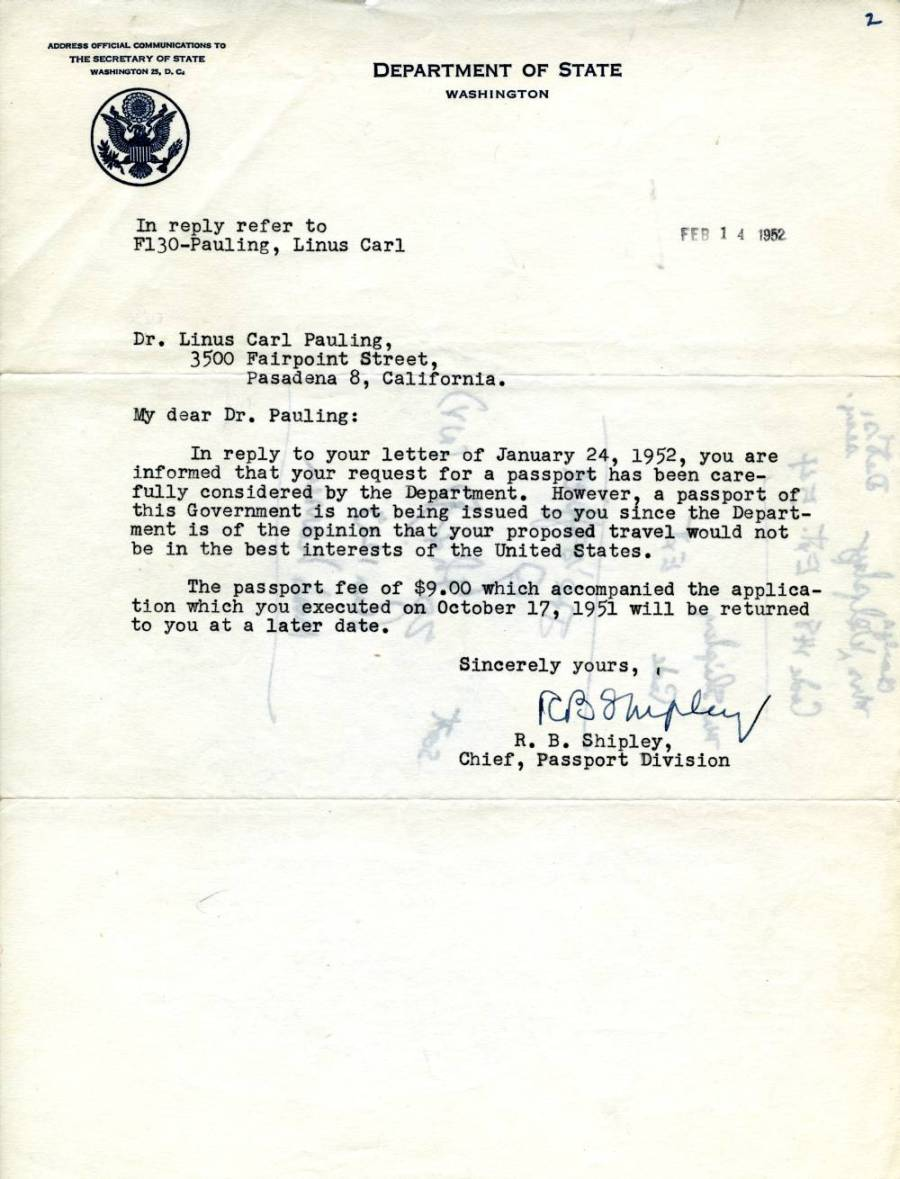
Letter notifying Pauling of Shipley's refusal to grant him a passport

==== Controversies ====
Her authority was widely acknowledged and rarely challenged with success. Decisions of the Passport Division were not subject to judicial review during her years of service and her authority was described as "limitless discretion." Bill Donovan of the Office of Strategic Services (OSS) first tried to win favor with Shipley by hiring her brother. When she nevertheless insisted on identifying OSS agents by noting "on Official Business" on their passports, Donovan had to get President Roosevelt to reverse her. Her efforts to deny travel privileges to the children of U.S. diplomats were similarly overridden in the years following World War II.

In the 1950s, she became the object of controversy when critics accused her of denying passports without due process on the basis of politics, while critics defended her actions as attempts to support the fight against Communism. Senator Wayne Morse called her decisions "tyrannical and capricious" for failure to disclose the reasons for the denial of passport applications. Her supporters included Secretary of State Dean Acheson and Senator Pat McCarran. Such decisions were made necessary by Section 6 of the Subversive Activities Control Act of 1950, which made it a crime for any member of a communist organization to use or obtain a passport. This provision was declared unconstitutional by the United States Supreme Court in its 1964 decision in the case of Aptheker v. Secretary of State.

In September 1952, Secretary of State Dean Acheson called his relations with Shipley's "Queendom of Passports" "a hard struggle" and said that passport, travel and visa issues were "the most distasteful part of this job." In 1953, she refused Linus Pauling a passport for travel to travel to accept the Nobel Prize in Chemistry because, using the standard language of her office, it "would not be in the best interests of the United States," but was overruled.

== Personal life ==
She married Frederick W. van Dorn Shipley in 1909. She left government service for several years while the couple lived in the Panama Canal Zone, where he worked in government administration until his poor health forced their return to the United States. They had a son born in 1911. Her husband died in 1919.

The American Jewish League Against Communism gave her an award for "a lifetime of service to the American people." She died in Washington, D.C., on November 3, 1966. She is buried in the Congressional Cemetery in Washington, D.C.

=== Family ===
Shipley's grandfather Alexander Bielaski died fighting for the Union at the Battle of Belmont and her uncle Oscar Bielaski was a professional baseball player. Her brother A. Bruce Bielaski headed the Bureau of Investigation, later the Federal Bureau of Investigation, in the Department of Justice during World War I.
