= Columbus-Belmont State Park =

State park in Kentucky, United States

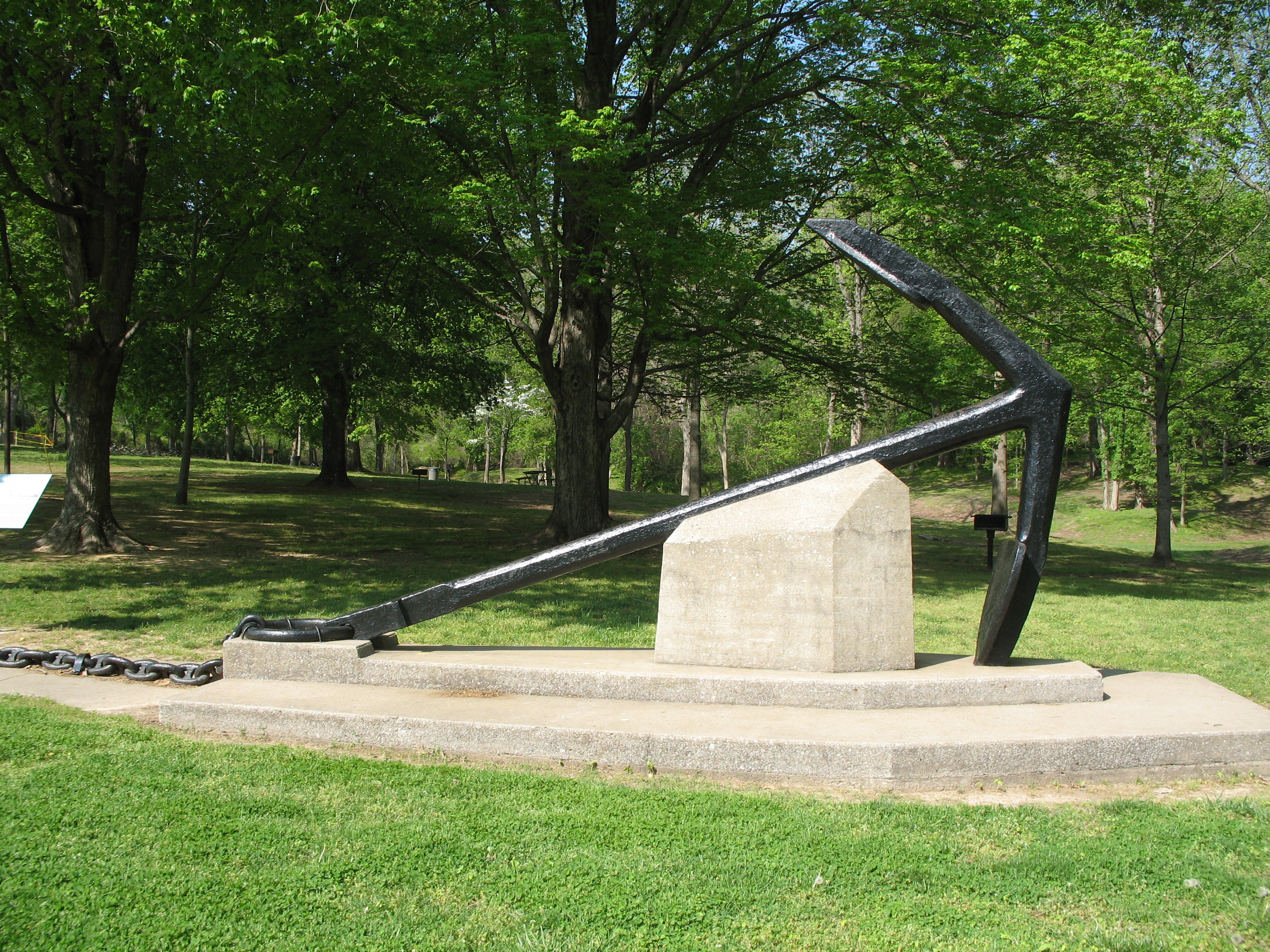
- Columbus-Belmont State Park Anchor

- Location within Kentucky Location within the United States
- Type: Kentucky state park
- Location: Hickman County, Kentucky, United States
- Coordinates: 36°45′56″N 89°06′25″W
- Area: 156 acres (63 ha)
- Created: 1934
- Operator: Kentucky Department of Parks
- Open: Year-round
- Website: Official website
- Columbus-Belmont State Park
- U.S. National Register of Historic Places
- Built: 1861
- NRHP reference No.: 73000806
- Added to NRHP: May 09, 1973

Columbus-Belmont State Park, on the shores of the Mississippi River in Hickman County, near Columbus, Kentucky, is the site of a Confederate fortification built during the American Civil War. The site was considered by both North and South to be strategically significant in gaining and keeping control of the Mississippi River. It commemorates military actions in Columbus, Kentucky, and across the river in Belmont, Missouri.

== History ==
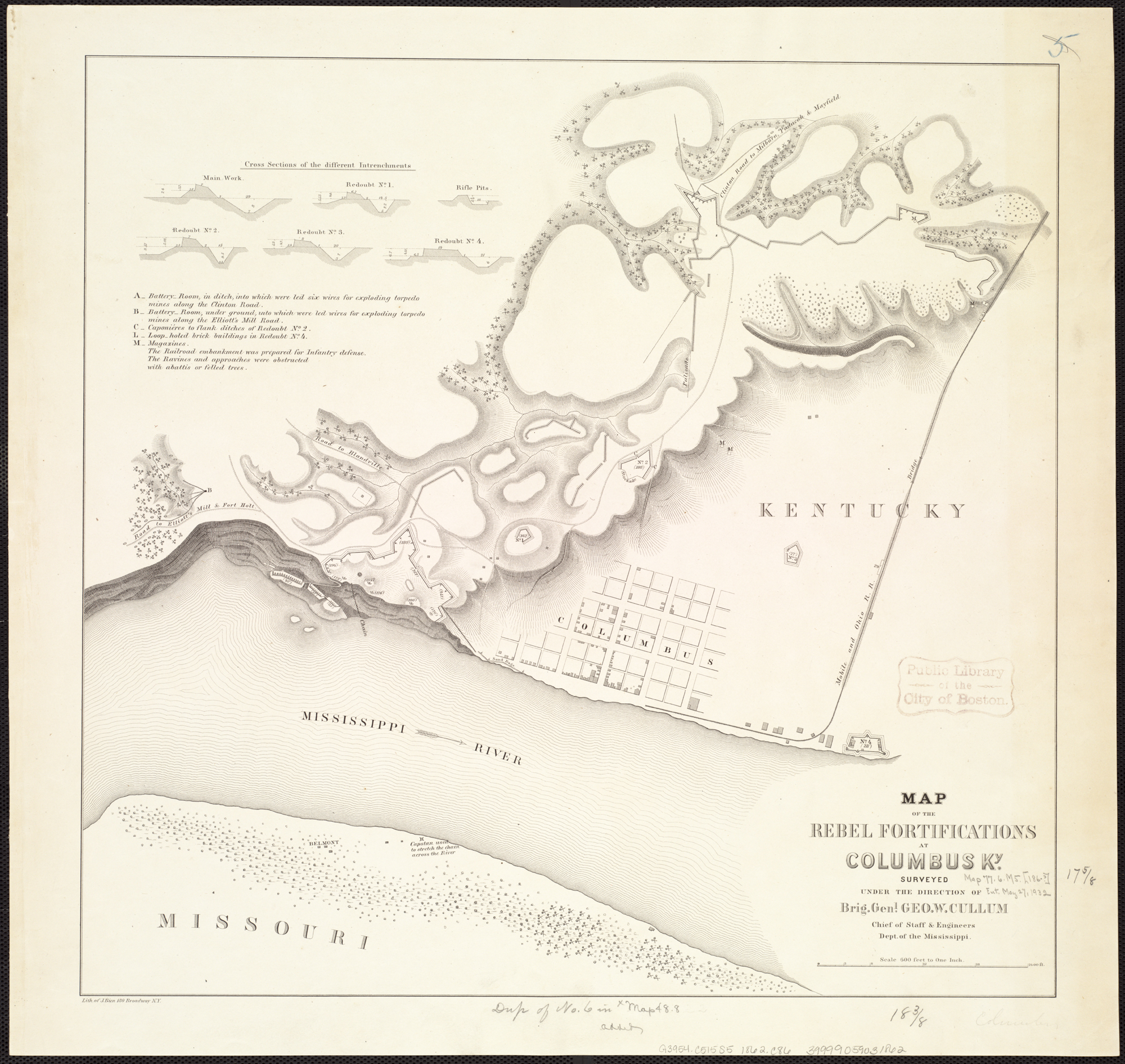
Map of rebel fortifications in 1862

Confederate General Leonidas Polk fortified the area now occupied by the park beginning September 3, 1861. The fort at Columbus was built upon a bluff along the "cutside" of the river. The fort was christened Fort De Russey, after an engineer supervising the construction of fortifications, but Polk referred to it as the "Gibraltar of the West". He had equipped it with a massive chain that stretched across the Mississippi to Belmont, Missouri, to block the passage of U.S. gunboats and supply vessels to and from destinations in the western theaters of the war. Equipped also with 143 cannons, Columbus was the northernmost Confederate base along the Mississippi, protecting Memphis, Tennessee, Vicksburg, Mississippi, and other critical Conferate-held territory. As the northern terminus of the Mobile and Ohio Railroad, Columbus was logistically tied to Confederate supply lines.

Many of the earthen fortifications, buildings, and artillery pieces were lost to the erosion of the bluff during heavy flooding in the region during the 1920s. When the flooding receded in 1925, the giant chain was exposed, and the people of Columbus decided to save it for future generations. The area containing the park was purchased by the state of Kentucky in 1934.

== Attractions ==
The primary attraction in the park continues to be Polk's giant chain, estimated to have been more than a mile long before flooding and erosion destroyed part of it. Its anchor weighed between four and six tons, and each chain link was eleven inches (280 mm) long. In 1934, during the Great Depression, the Civilian Conservation Corps built a stone monument to hold the chain.

Another attraction at the park is the "Lady Polk", the remains of a giant experimental cannon named for Polk's wife. At 10 feet (3.0 m) long and 15,000 pounds, the imposing gun bombarded Ulysses S. Grant's troops at the Battle of Belmont with 128-pound conical projectiles that it could fire up to three miles (4.8 km). However, repeated shots from the cannon heated and expanded the metal barrel, deforming it. When soldiers fired the last loaded but unfired shot from the Battle of Belmont two days later, the projectile could not escape the barrel. The cannon exploded into three pieces and killed 18 Confederate soldiers. A Federal newspaper soon after mocked that: "a person would be likely to consider himself as safe on one end [of the cannon] as the other."

== Museum ==
A single surviving antebellum building at the park, once a farmhouse, served as a Confederate hospital during the early part of the war. The restored building is used as a museum and interpretive center for the Kentucky state park system. Exhibits focus on the Civil War history of the area and local natural and cultural history. The museum is open daily from May through September and on weekends in April and October.

== See also ==
- Fort Defiance (Illinois)
- Battle of Belmont
- Battle of Island Number Ten
