= John L. T. Sneed =

American judge (1820–1901)

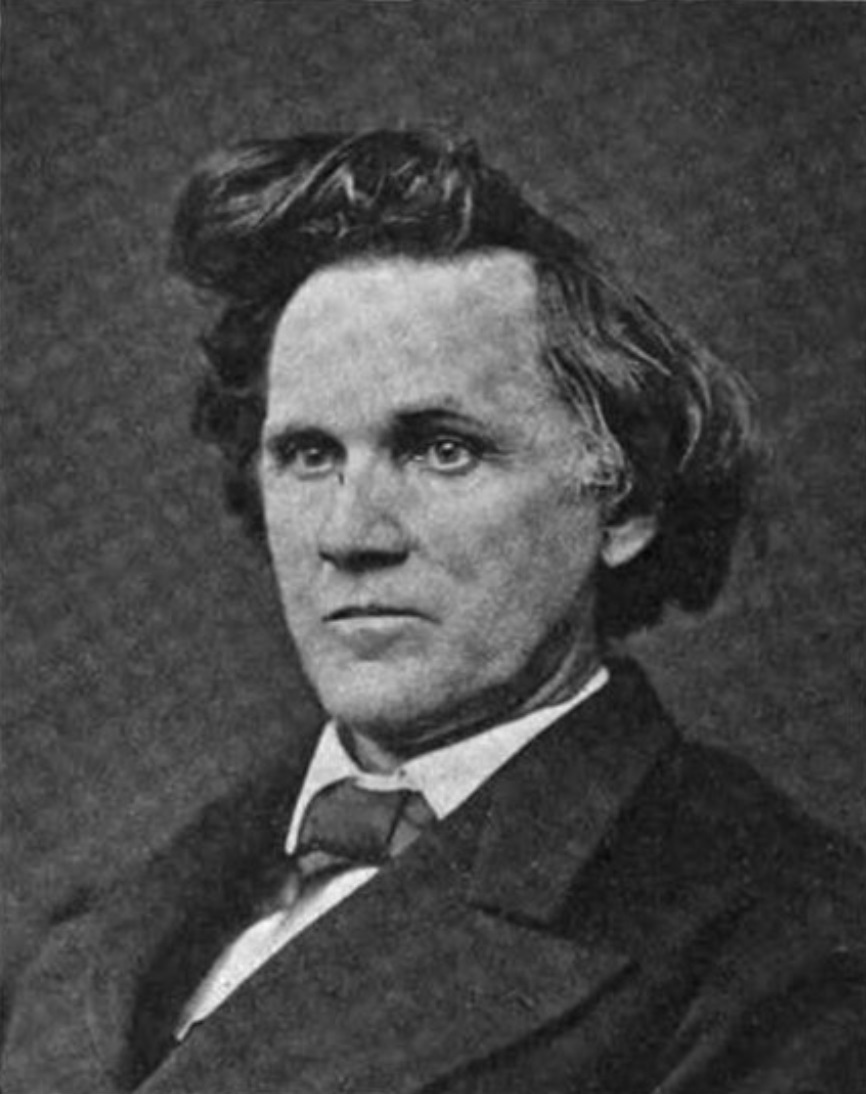
Judge John L. T. Sneed

John Louis Taylor Sneed (1820 – June 29, 1901) was a justice of the Tennessee Supreme Court from 1870 to 1878. He also served as Attorney General of Tennessee. He served in the Mexican–American War and became a brigadier general in the pro-Confederate Tennessee militia during the American Civil War.

== Early life, education, and career ==
Born in Raleigh, North Carolina, he was named for his grandfather, John Louis Taylor, who was chief justice of North Carolina at the time of Sneed's birth. His mother died when he was very young, and he was sent to live with his uncle, Stephen K. Sneed, who shortly afterward moved to West Tennessee. After reaching manhood, Sneed began the study of law, being admitted to practice in 1843, opening an office at Memphis. In 1845 he was elected as a representative for Shelby County in the Tennessee House of Representatives. On the call for volunteers for the Mexican–American War, he enlisted, reaching the rank of captain. In 1851 he was elected by the legislature to serve as attorney general for the Memphis Judicial District, resigning in 1854 to become a candidate for Attorney General of Tennessee. He was elected and served for five years, from 1854 to 1859. He compiled volumes 33-37 of Tennessee Reports. After retiring from that office, he was the unsuccessful Whig candidate for Congress in his district.

On the breaking out of the American Civil War, Governor Harris appointed Sneed as a brigadier general in the Provisional Army of Tennessee, in the Confederate States Army; but on the mustering of the troops into the Confederate service, he was not given a commission. He then enlisted as a private, and served until 1863, when he was appointed by Governor Harris commissioner on the part of Tennessee to settle its affairs with the Confederate States. This work occupied him until the end of the war, after which he resumed the practice of law at Memphis.

== Judicial service and later life ==
He was elected to the state supreme court in 1870, but he failed in his bid for renomination 1878. He was shortly afterward appointed by Governor Marks as a judge of the Court of Arbitration, a tribunal established to relieve the Supreme Court of its accumulated cases, to which appealed cases might be submitted by consent, its decree to be made the decree of the Supreme Court. In 1883, on the creation of the Commission of Referees, which succeeded the Court of Arbitration as a means of relief of the Supreme Court, he was made a member of the commission for East Tennessee. He was an unsuccessful candidate for a U.S. Senate seat in 1887. He was a chancellor in Memphis, succeeding Judge William D. Beard in 1894.

He and his wife grew peaches on their property.

== See also ==
- Provisional Army of Tennessee
- List of justices of the Tennessee Supreme Court
- Pardons for ex-Confederates

Political offices
Preceded by Newly constituted court	Justice of the Tennessee Supreme Court; 1870–1878	Succeeded by William Frierson Cooper
