= Provisional Army of Tennessee =

- Founded: May 9, 1861
- Disbanded: August 7, 1861
- Country: Tennessee (June 8, 1861 — July 2, 1861)
- Type: Army
- Size: 22 regiments of infantry, 2 regiments of cavalry, 10 companies of artillery, engineer corps, ordnance bureau etc.

Commanders
- Commander-in-chief: Governor Isham Harris
- Senior Major General: Gideon Johnson Pillow
- Major General: Samuel Read Anderson
- Brigadier Generals: William R. Caswell, Benjamin F. Cheatham, Robert G. Foster III, John L. T. Sneed, Felix Zollicoffer
- Adjutant-General: Daniel S. Donelson

The Provisional Army of Tennessee was activated on May 9, 1861, when Tennessee had entered into a military league with the Confederate States. The army was to contain 25,000 men for field service and 30,000 in the reserves. The staff officers were appointed by the governor, while the field, company, and non-commissioned officers were elected by the men. It was transferred to the Provisional Army of the Confederate States on July 31, 1861, and the transfer was concluded by August 7.

== Background ==
After the fall of Fort Sumter and President Abraham Lincoln's call for troops to suppress the rebellion, the Tennessee General Assembly met in extra session and authorized Governor Isham G. Harris to enter into a military league with the Confederate States. On May 6, 1861, the General Assembly passed an ordinance of secession from the United States to be ratified by the people. The state militia had been abolished in 1857, and the state lacked any military organizations. To fill this lacuna, the General Assembly created the Provisional Army of Tennessee.

== Organization ==
The General Assembly authorized Governor Harris to organize and equip a provisional force of volunteers. This force should contain 25,000 men for field service and 30,000 in the reserves, enlisted for a period of twelve months. The force should be under the command of a senior major general, and be organized into regiments, brigades and divisions. The staff should contain an adjutant-general, an inspector-general, a paymaster-general, a commissary-general, a quartermaster-general (all with the rank of colonel in the cavalry), and a surgeon-general. There would also be an ordnance officer (with the rank of colonel of infantry) in charge of the Ordnance Bureau as well as a chief of engineers. These officers and their assistants were to be appointed by Harris subject to the confirmation of the General Assembly. The field-grade officers of the regiments raised were to be elected by the whole regiment; the company-grade officers and the non-commissioned officers by the company.

Each regiment of infantry should consist of one colonel, one lieutenant colonel, one major, and ten companies. Each company to consist of one captain, one first lieutenant, two second lieutenants, four sergeants, four corporals, two musicians, and 64 to 90 privates. Each regiment to have an adjutant selected from the lieutenants, and one sergeant-major selected from the enlisted men. Each regiment of cavalry should consist of one colonel, one lieutenant colonel, one major, and ten companies. Each company to consist of one captain, one first lieutenant, two second lieutenants, four sergeants, four corporals, one farrier, one blacksmith, two musicians, and 60 privates. Each regiment to have an adjutant selected from the lieutenants, and one sergeant-major selected from the enlisted men.

== Appointments ==
Gideon Johnson Pillow and Samuel Read Anderson were appointed major-generals; William R. Caswell, Benjamin F. Cheatham, Robert G. Foster III, John L. T. Sneed, Felix Zollicoffer brigadier-generals; adjutant-general Daniel Smith Donelson; inspector-general William Henry Carroll; quartermaster-general Vernon K. Stevenson; commissary-general R.G. Fain; paymaster-general William Williams; surgeon-general Dr. B.W. Avent. The appointments of Pillow and Anderson, both Democrats, were not popular in the traditionally Whig West Tennessee. Of the five brigadier-generals all except Cheatham were Whigs.

== Preparations ==
On April 25 Harris ordered General Anderson to take command at Memphis and to organize the volunteer forces that were assembling there. He remained there until May 3, when the command was turned over to General Sneed. Ten companies mustered into state service in Nashville became the First Tennessee Regiment on May 3. Placed under the command of Colonel George Earl Maney, it was the first regiment of the provisional army to be raised. About the same time, another regiment was mustered into service at Winchester; it became the First Confederate Tennessee under Colonel Peter Turney. By May 5, about 171 companies had reported themselves ready for the field. General Anderson became commander of the Middle Department with headquarters at Memphis. General Foster took command of Camp Cheatham in Robertson County, General Zollicoffer of Camp Trousdale, Sumner County, General Caswell of the forces in East Tennessee (with headquarters at Knoxville), General Cheatham at Union City, and General Sneed at Randolph.

Early in June five or six batteries were posted along the Mississippi River from Memphis to Knoxville. Commanding the leading strategic points, the batteries were equipped with mortars, columbiads and 24- and 32-pound cannons, and manned by ten companies of artillery under Colonel John P. McCown. About 15,000 volunteers were assembled in West Tennessee under the command of General Pillow. They were concentrated in the forts still under construction: Fort Harris, Fort Wright and Fort Pillow. No more than 4,000 volunteers guarded the supply depot at Nashville and only a minimal force was maintained at Knoxville. Harris assumed that Kentucky could remain neutral during the war and let the Tennessee-Kentucky border remain undefended.

== Transfer ==
The General Assembly resolved on June 29 that the governor was authorized to place at the disposal of the Confederate States the volunteer forces of Tennessee, and to place the defense of the state in the hands of President Jefferson Davis. On July 31 Harris ordered the officers to muster their commands for the inspection of senior officers from the Confederacy. Rolls of companies and regiments were turned over to the Confederate inspectors, which would act as a formal transfer of the troops from Tennessee to the Confederate States. The transfer was concluded on August 7. Pillow, Anderson and Donelson were commissioned brigadier generals in the Confederate States Army. The Provisional Army of Tennessee formed the core of the Confederate Army of Tennessee. When the army was turned over, it contained 22 regiments of infantry, 2 regiments of cavalry, 10 companies of artillery, engineer corps, ordnance bureau etc.
