= Stanley Finch =

First director of the FBI, from 1908 to 1912

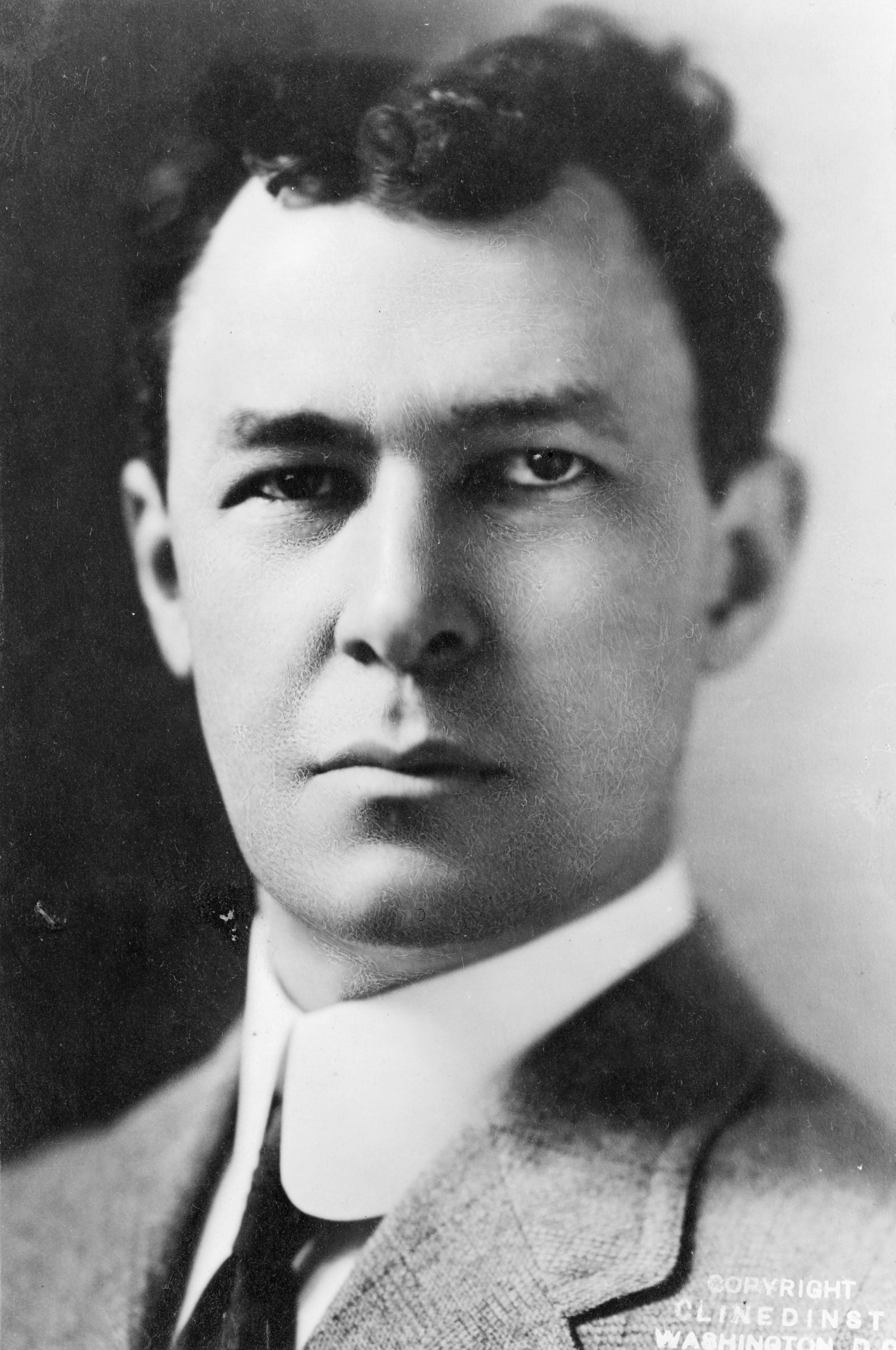

1st Chief of the Bureau of Investigation
- In office July 26, 1908 – April 30, 1912
- President: Theodore Roosevelt; William Howard Taft
- Preceded by: Position established
- Succeeded by: A. Bruce Bielaski

Personal details
- Born: July 20, 1872 Monticello, New York, U.S.
- Died: November 22, 1951 (aged 79) Washington, D.C., U.S.
- Education: George Washington University (LLB, LLM)

Stanley Wellington Finch (July 20, 1872 – November 22, 1951) was the first director of the Bureau of Investigation (1908–1912), which would eventually become the FBI.

== Life ==
Finch was born in Monticello, New York, in 1872. He became a clerk in the United States Department of Justice, where he worked off and on for almost 40 years. Finch rose from the position of clerk to that of chief examiner between 1893 and 1908. While working in the Justice Department, Finch earned his LL.B degree (1908), followed by an LL.M degree (1909) from what is now The George Washington University Law School. He was admitted to the Washington, DC bar in 1911.

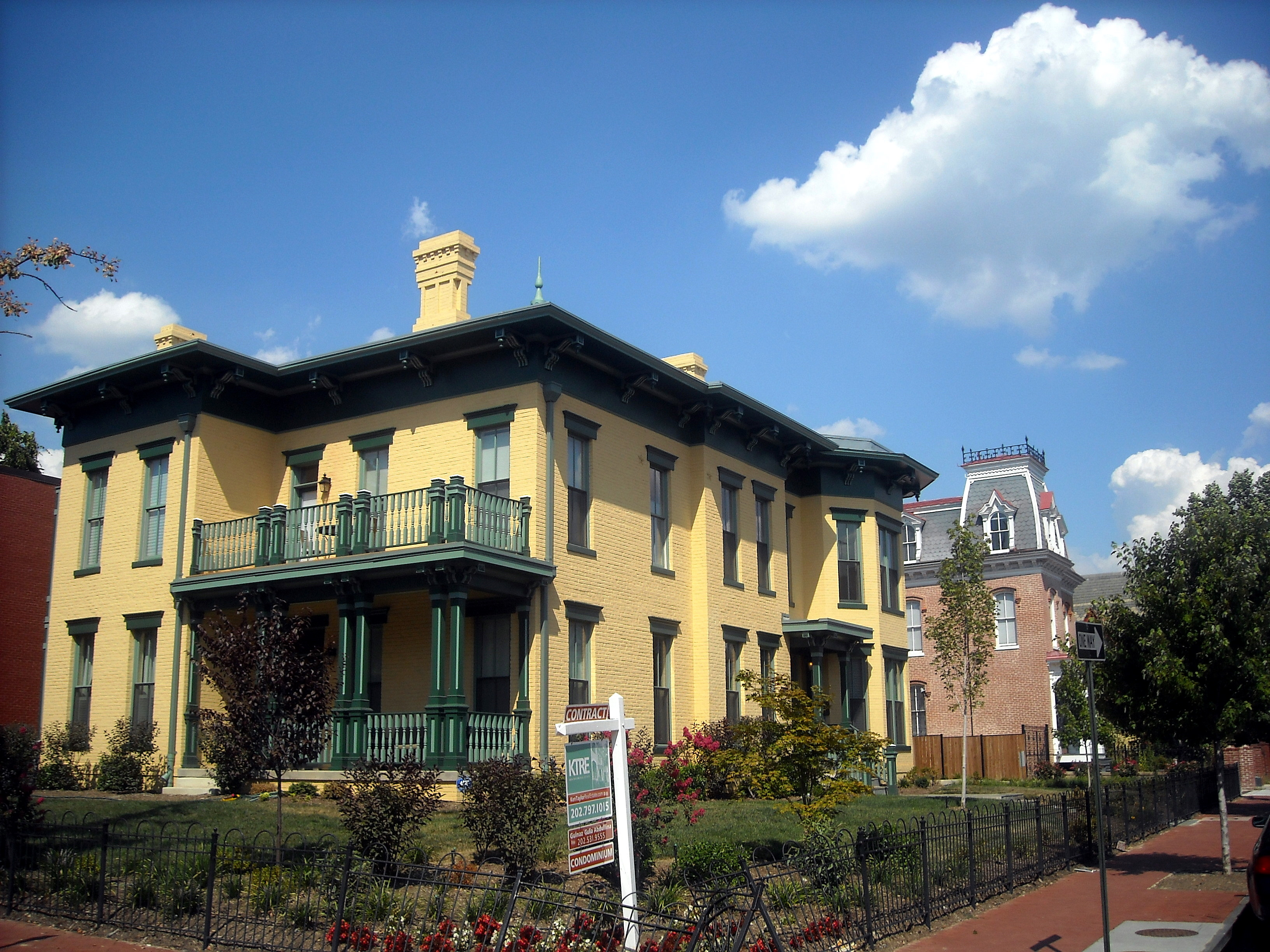
Former Washington, D.C. residence (left) of Stanley Finch

Previously, when the Justice Department needed to investigate a crime, it would borrow Secret Service personnel from the Treasury Department. As chief examiner, Finch advocated setting up a squad of detectives within the Justice Department.

Attorney General Charles Joseph Bonaparte created a Special Agent force and gave oversight of the force, later named the Bureau of Investigation (BOI), to Finch. Thus, he created what would become the FBI.

From 1913 to the 1930s, Finch alternated between private employment—primarily in the novelty manufacturing business—and positions in the Justice Department. He finally retired from the Justice Department in 1940.

Government offices
New office	Chief of the Bureau of Investigation; 1908–1912	Succeeded by A. Bruce Bielaski
