= 79th Illinois Infantry Regiment =

79th Regiment Illinois Volunteer Infantry
- Illinois flag
- Active: August 28, 1862, to June 12, 1865
- Country: United States
- Allegiance: Union
- Branch: Infantry
- Engagements: American Civil War: Battle of Perryville; Battle of Stones River; Tullahoma Campaign; Battle of Chickamauga; Chattanooga Campaign; Battle of Missionary Ridge; Knoxville Campaign; Relief of Knoxville; Atlanta Campaign; Battle of Rocky Face Ridge; Battle of Resaca; Battle of Kennesaw Mountain; Battle of Peachtree Creek; Siege of Atlanta; Battle of Jonesborough; Franklin-Nashville Campaign; Battle of Spring Hill; Battle of Franklin; Battle of Nashville

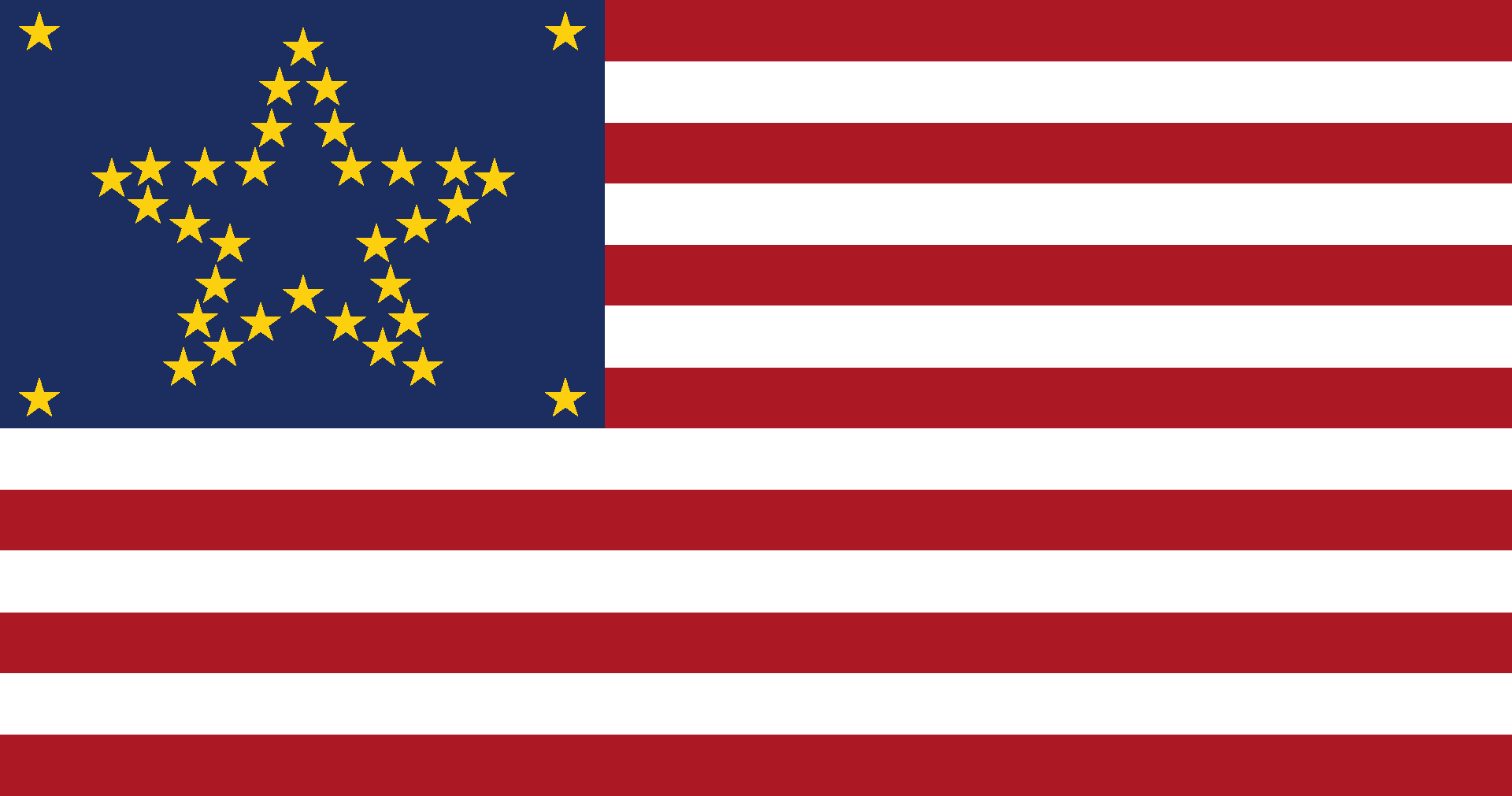
Flag used by the 79th Illinois Infantry Regiment

The 79th Regiment Illinois Volunteer Infantry was an infantry regiment that served in the Union Army during the American Civil War.

== Army of Kentucky and Army of the Ohio ==
The 79th Illinois Infantry was organized at Mattoon, Illinois and mustered into Federal service on August 28, 1862. The regiment was first ordered to Louisville, Kentucky and attached to the 3rd Brigade of Cruft's Division as part of the Army of Kentucky. On Steptember 13 the regiment was transferred to the 4th Brigade, 2nd Division in the III Corps of the Army of the Ohio under Maj. Gen. Don Carlos Buell.

On October 1, 1862, the regiment was transferred to the 5th Brigade, 2nd Division in the I Corps of the Army of the Ohio under the command of Maj. Gen. Alexander M. McCook. The unit participated in the Pursuit of Gen. Braxton Bragg and his Army of Mississippi into Kentucky and the Battle of Perryville on October 8. During the battle, the regiment, as part of the Union left flank, was attacked by a Confederate division was forced to fall back. When additional Confederate divisions joined the fray, the Union line made a stubborn stand, counterattacked, but finally fell back with some units routed.

== Army of the Cumberland ==
=== XIV Corps ===
In November 1862 the regiment was part of the reorganization of the Army of the Ohio into the XIV Corps of the Army of the Cumberland under Gen. William Rosecrans and was transferred to the 2nd Brigade, 2nd Division, Right Wing under Brig. Gen. Richard W. Johnson. The regiment participated in the Battle of Stones River from December 31, 1862 – January 2, 1863. The regiment, as part right flank of the army, was overrun in a surprise attack at dawn on December 31, with the 2nd division overall suffering over 50% casualties. Colonel Sheridan P. Read, the regimental commander of the 79th Illinois, as well as Brig. Gen. Edward N. Kirk, the commander of the 2nd Brigade, were both killed during the battle.

=== XX Corps ===
==== Tullahoma Campaign ====
Following the severe losses at Stones River, the XIV Corps was reorganized into the XX Corps (also known as "McCook's Corps" after its commander) of the Army of the Cumberland in January 1863. The regiment participated in the Tullahoma Campaign from June 24 – July 3, and later fought in the bloody Battle of Chickamauga from September 18 to September 20 where the XX Corps suffered horrendous casualties.

=== IV Corps ===
==== Chattanooga Campaign ====
Following the battle, on October 10, 1863, the XX Corps was consolidated with the XXI Corps into the IV Corps of the Army of the Cumberland, under Maj. Gen. Gordon Granger. The 79th Illinois was transferred to the 3rd Brigade, 2nd Division, under Maj. Gen. Philip H. Sheridan, where it served for the remainder of the war. The regiment participated in the Chattanooga Campaign from September 21 – November 25. On November 25, 1863, during the Battle of Missionary Ridge, the 2nd division served with distinction when it broke through Confederate lines at Missionary Ridge in an unordered charge on a seemingly impregnable Confederate position, leading to a rout of one of the Confederacy's two major armies.

==== Knoxville Campaign ====
As part of a column under the command of Maj. Gen. William Tecumseh Sherman, the IV Corps participated in the Relief of Knoxville from November 28 – December 7, 1863. The IV Corps remained in Knoxville to reinforce Maj. Gen. Ambrose Burnside before rejoining the Army of the Cumberland in spring 1864 for the Atlanta Campaign under the command of Maj. Gen. Oliver O. Howard.

==== Atlanta Campaign ====
The 79th Illinois participated in the Atlanta Campaign from May 7 – July 17, 1864 as part of the 2nd division under the command of Brig. Gen. John Newton. The regiment took part in the battles of Rocky Face Ridge from May 7–13, Resaca from May 13 – 15, and Kennesaw Mountain on June 27. During the Battle of Peachtree Creek on July 20, the entire left flank of the Union position was held by the 2nd division alone, which successfully repelled an entire Corps, inflicting heavy losses. The regiment continued to support the Siege of Atlanta until August 31 when, under command of Maj. Gen. David S. Stanley, the IV Corps participated in a frontal assault in the Battle of Jonesborough which breached the Confederate defenses, leading to the capture of Atlanta on September 2, 1864.

==== Franklin-Nashville Campaign ====
In autumn 1864, the 79th Illinois participated in the Franklin-Nashville Campaign, with the 2nd division under the command of Brig. Gen. George D. Wagner, taking part in the Battle of Spring Hill on November 29. During the Battle of Franklin on November 30, the 2nd and 3rd brigades were poorly positioned forward of the main Union lines and overrun in the initial attack, leading to the capture of nearly 700 men from the two brigades. The regiment also took part in the Battle of Nashville on December 15–16, 1864, which effectively destroyed the Army of Tennessee as a fighting force, pursuing them to the Tennessee River on December 25.

=== 1865 and Discharge ===
Following the Franklin-Nashville Campaign, the 79th Illinois was stationed at Decatur, Alabama from January 6 - March 30, 1865, followed by Nashville, Tennessee from April 22 - June 12. The regiment was mustered out on June 12, 1865, and discharged at Camp Butler, Illinois, on June 21, 1865.

== Total strength and casualties ==
The regiment suffered 4 officers and 81 enlisted men who were killed in action or who died of their wounds and 1 officer and 211 enlisted men who died of disease, for a total of 297 fatalities.

== Commanders ==
- Colonel Lyman Guinnip - Resigned October 17, 1862.
- Colonel Sheridan P. Read - Killed in action at the Battle of Stone's River December 31, 1862.
- Colonel Allen Buckner - Mustered out with the regiment.

== See also ==
- List of Illinois Civil War Units
- Illinois in the American Civil War
