= Oscar Bielaski =

American baseball player (1847–1911)

- Right fielder
- Born: March 21, 1847; Washington, D.C., U.S.
- Died: November 8, 1911 (aged 64); Washington, D.C., U.S.
- Batted: Right Threw: Right

Major-league debut
- April 24, 1872, for the Washington Nationals

Last major-league appearance
- July 21, 1876, for the Chicago White Stockings

Major-league statistics
- Batting average: .240
- Home runs: 0
- Runs batted in: 52
- Stats at Baseball Reference

Teams
- Washington Nationals (1872); Washington Blue Legs (1873); Baltimore Canaries (1874); Chicago White Stockings (1875–1876)

Oscar Bielaski (March 21, 1847 – November 8, 1911) was an American professional baseball player and the first Polish-American to play major-league baseball, playing from 1872 until 1876. His father, Alexander Bielaski, a captain in the Union army, died at the Battle of Belmont. A. Bruce Bielaski, head of the Bureau of Investigation, and his sister, Ruth Shipley, head of the State Department's Passport Division, were first cousins of Oscar. Oscar learned to play baseball while enlisted in the Union Army as a drummer.

Oscar Bielaski was inducted in the National Polish-American Sports Hall of Fame in 2005.

Oscar was born in Washington, D.C., and died there, at the age of 64. He is interred at Arlington National Cemetery in Arlington, Virginia.
