= 27th Illinois Infantry Regiment =

27th Regiment Illinois Volunteer Infantry
- Illinois state flag
- Active: August 10, 1861, to September 20, 1864
- Country: United States
- Allegiance: Union
- Branch: Infantry
- Engagements: Battle of Belmont; Battle of Island Number Ten; Siege of Corinth; Battle of Stone's River; Battle of Chickamauga; Battle of Missionary Ridge; Battle of Resaca; Battle of Kennesaw Mountain

The 27th Regiment Illinois Volunteer Infantry was an infantry regiment that served in the Union Army during the American Civil War.

== Service ==
The 27th Illinois Infantry was organized at Camp Butler, Illinois and mustered into Federal service 10 August 1861. The regiment fought in the Battles of Belmont, Island No. 10, Corinth, Farmington, LaVerne, Stone's River, and the Tullahoma Campaign; at Chickamauga, the Battles for Chattanooga, the Relief of Knoxville, and in the Atlanta Campaign, including the Battles of Buzzards Roost, New Hope Church, and Kennesaw Mountain where the 27th Illinois spearheaded the uphill assault. Pulled out of the line at Atlanta 24 August 1864, the regiment was sent via Nashville to Springfield, Illinois, where 20 September 1864 it was mustered out.

However, 90 reenlistees (most reenlisted 1 January 1864 at Blain's Cross Road [today Blaine], Tennessee) of the 27th Illinois Infantry were kept together at Atlanta as the 27th Illinois Veteran Detachment under the command of Capt. William B. Young, 1st Lt. Israel Heaps adjutant, and were attached for logistic purposes to the 79th Illinois Volunteer Infantry Regiment as Company I. Armed with 20 new Henry repeating rifles, the 27th Illinois Veteran Detachment distinguished itself at the Battles of Spring Hill, Franklin (Heaps was captured in the debacle of Wagner's Advance Line) and Nashville (Young was killed in the impromptu and successful IV Corps charge up Overton Hill).

The 27th Illinois Veteran Detachment was disbanded 26 May 1865, with its survivors assigned to Company G, 9th Illinois Consolidated Mounted Infantry (essentially dragoons). A few of the 27th Illinois Veterans elected to remain with the 79th Illinois Infantry. Most were discharged in June 1865.

== Total strength and casualties through 24 September 1864 ==
The regiment suffered 7 officers and 96 enlisted men who were killed in action or who died of their wounds and 2 officers and 83 enlisted men who died of disease, for a total of 188 fatalities.

== Commanders ==
- Colonel Napoleon Bonaparte Buford
- Colonel Fazilo A. Harrington - killed at Stones River
- Colonel Jonathan R. Miles
- Colonel William Andrew Schmitt - Mustered out with the regiment.

== See also ==
- List of Illinois Civil War Units
- Illinois in the American Civil War
