= Belmont, Missouri =

Ghost town in Mississippi County, Missouri, United States

Coordinates: 36.7664457°N 89.1217338°W

Belmont is a ghost town along the Mississippi River in Mississippi County, Missouri, United States. The GNIS classifies it as a populated place under the name "Belmont Landing".

== History ==
Belmont was platted in 1853, and named after August Belmont, a businessman interested in the site. A post office called Belmont Landing was in operation from 1867 until 1869, and a post office called Belmont from 1869 until 1923.

Belmont was the scene of a Civil War battle, the Battle of Belmont in 1861. The community lends its name to the Columbus-Belmont State Park, a Civil War site across the Mississippi River in Hickman County, Kentucky.

After the Reconstruction era, whites asserted their dominance, often by violence and intimidation. In May 1905, a mob of 200 to 300 whites lynched Tom Witherspoon, a.k.a. Robert Pettigrew, an African-American man, for alleged kidnapping and threats against a white man. This event took place during an era of increased violence by whites against blacks due to economic problems and social tensions. A series of floods (1912, 1922, and 1937) inundated the town of Belmont, particularly the 1937 flood. Many people moved away after this destruction and the town became abandoned; the post office closed in 1923.

== See also ==
- List of ghost towns in Missouri
