= Kentucky Route 94 =

State highway in Kentucky, United States

Kentucky Route 94
- KY 94 highlighted in red

Route information
- Maintained by KYTC
- Length: 79.816 mi (128.451 km)

Major junctions
- West end: SR 78 at the Tennessee state line near Tyler
- US 51 north of Fulton; US 45 / KY 1529 near Water Valley; US 641 in Murray
- East end: KY 80 near Aurora

Location
- Country: United States
- State: Kentucky
- Counties: Fulton, Graves, Calloway, Marshall

Highway system
- Kentucky State Highway System; Interstate; US; State; Parkways
← KY 93	→ KY 95

Kentucky Route 94 (KY 94) is a 79.816-mile-long (128.451 km) state highway in Kentucky that runs from Tennessee State Route 78 at the Tennessee state line to KY 80 southwest of the unincorporated community of Aurora via Hickman, Water Valley, and Murray.

== Major intersections ==
County	Location	mi	km	Destinations	Notes
Fulton		0.000	0.000	SR 78 south / Great River Road south – Tiptonville	Southern terminus; continuation beyond Tennessee state line
Fulton	Tyler	0.587	0.945	KY 2134 west to KY 971	Eastern terminus of KY 2134
Fulton		1.436	2.311	KY 1282 east	Western terminus of KY 1282
Fulton		4.083	6.571	KY 653 north to KY 971 south	Southern terminus of KY 653; KY 971 just west of intersection
Fulton		7.473	12.027	KY 311 south	Northern terminus of KY 311
Fulton		10.902	17.545	KY 1099 north	Southern terminus of KY 1099
Fulton	Hickman	11.768	18.939	KY 1354 west – Dorena-Hickman Ferry	Eastern terminus of KY 1354
Fulton	Hickman	12.150	19.554	KY 309 south (Broadway Street)	Northern terminus of KY 309
Fulton	Hickman	13.218	21.272	KY 125 south (Troy Avenue)	Northern terminus of KY 125
Fulton	Hickman	13.642	21.955	KY 1099 south (South 7th Street)	Northern terminus of KY 1099
Fulton		17.098	27.517	KY 2140 south	Northern terminus of KY 2140
Fulton		18.162	29.229	KY 1129	
Fulton		19.701	31.706	KY 1127 south	Northern terminus of KY 1127
Fulton		20.548	33.069	KY 1212 south	Northern terminus of KY 1212
Fulton		22.121	35.600	KY 239 / Great River Road – Union City, Clinton	Northern end of Great River Road overlap
Fulton		22.855	36.782	KY 1907 north	Southern terminus of KY 1907
Fulton		23.448	37.736	KY 781 south	Western end of KY 781 overlap
Fulton		24.471	39.382	KY 781 north	Eastern end of KY 781 overlap
Fulton		26.105	42.012	KY 1125 south	Western end of KY 1125 overlap
Fulton		26.621	42.842	KY 1125 north	Eastern end of KY 1125 overlap
Fulton		27.084	43.587	KY 1706 south	Northern terminus of KY 1706
Fulton		28.158	45.316	KY 1909 south	Northern terminus of KY 1909
Fulton		29.115	46.856	US 51 – Fulton, Clinton	
Fulton		29.247	47.068	KY 94C south to US 51	Northern terminus of KY 94 Connector
Hickman	Enon	31.223	50.249	KY 307	
Hickman		32.280	51.950	KY 1698 north	Southern terminus of KY 1698
Hickman		33.458	53.845	US 45 south – Fulton	Western end of US 45 concurrency
Graves	Water Valley	34.966	56.272	US 45 north / KY 1529 west – Wingo	Eastern end of US 45 concurrency; eastern terminus of KY 1529
Graves		35.466	57.077	KY 943 south	Northern terminus of KY 943
Graves	Pilot Oak	39.801	64.054	KY 129 north	Western end of KY 129 overlap
Graves	Pilot Oak	40.067	64.482	KY 129 south	Eastern end of KY 129 overlap
Graves		42.446	68.310	KY 385 north	Western end of KY 385 overlap
Graves		42.941	69.107	KY 385 south	Eastern end of KY 385 overlap
Graves		44.951	72.342	KY 303 – Cuba, Mayfield	
Graves		48.001	77.250	KY 1382 south	Northern terminus of KY 1382
Graves	Lynnville	48.558	78.147	KY 381 – Mayfield, Dresden	
Graves		48.707	78.386	KY 1800 east (Swan Road)	Western terminus of KY 1800
Graves		50.234	80.844	KY 83 west	Eastern terminus of KY 83
Graves	Tri City	51.646	83.116	KY 97 – Mayfield, Paris	
Graves		52.121	83.881	KY 564 north	Southern terminus of KY 564
Graves		53.616	86.287	KY 1814 north (Beech Grove Road)	Southern terminus of KY 1814
Calloway	Lynn Grove	57.363	92.317	KY 893 (Rayburn Road)	
Calloway		59.224	95.312	KY 299 north (Butterworth Road)	Southern terminus of KY 299
Calloway		60.249	96.961	KY 783 south (Crossland Road)	Western end of KY 783 overlap
Calloway		60.743	97.756	KY 783 north (Rob Mason Road)	Eastern end of KY 783 overlap
Calloway	Murray	62.305	100.270	KY 1660 north (Robertson Road North)	Southern terminus of KY 1660
Calloway	Murray	63.856	102.766	KY 822 south (16th Street) – Murray State University	Northern terminus of KY 822; university to the north on 16th
Calloway	Murray	64.376	103.603	US 641 / KY 121 (12th Street) – Paris, CFSB Center	
Calloway	Murray	65.102	104.772	US 641 Bus. (4th Street) – Paris, Dover, Hazel	
Calloway	Murray	65.494	105.402	KY 2594 north (Industrial Road)	Southern terminus of KY 2594
Calloway		67.027	107.870	KY 1483 north (Van Cleave Road)	Southern terminus of KY 1483
Calloway		67.698	108.949	KY 280 (Pottertown Road) to KY 1536 – East Calloway Elementary	Western terminus of KY 280
Calloway		70.539	113.522	KY 732 east (Irvin Cobb Road)	Western terminus of KY 732
Calloway		71.974	115.831	KY 94C north to KY 80	Southern end of KY-94/KY-80 connector
Calloway		73.607	118.459	KY 463 west (Almo-Shiloh Road)	Eastern terminus of KY 463
Calloway		74.165	119.357	KY 1551 west (Crabtree Road)	Eastern terminus of KY 1551
Calloway		75.480	121.473	KY 1346 (Green Valley Road/Highland Road)	
Calloway		77.416	124.589	KY 497 east (Lancaster Road)	Western terminus of KY 497
Marshall		79.816	128.451	KY 80 to US 68 – Aurora, Kenlake State Resort Park, Land Between the Lakes	Eastern terminus
1.000 mi = 1.609 km; 1.000 km = 0.621 mi: Concurrency terminus; Incomplete access

== Special routes ==
=== Kentucky Route 94 Spur (Calloway County) ===
Kentucky Route 94 Spur
- Location: Calloway County
- Length: 0.385 mi (620 m)

Kentucky Route 94 Spur (known as KY 94C for identification purposes) is a 0.385-mile spur route of Kentucky Route 94 in rural Calloway County northeast of Murray that connects KY 94 to Kentucky Route 80.

==== Major intersections ====
The entire route is in Calloway County.

Location	mi	km	Destinations	Notes
	0.000	0.000	KY 94	Southern terminus
	0.385	0.620	KY 80	Northern terminus
1.000 mi = 1.609 km; 1.000 km = 0.621 mi

=== Kentucky Route 94 Spur (Fulton County) ===
Kentucky Route 94 Spur
- Location: Fulton County
- Length: 0.312 mi (502 m)

Kentucky Route 94 Spur (known as KY 94C for identification purposes) is a 0.312-mile spur route of Kentucky Route 94 in rural Fulton County halfway between Crutchfield and Fulton that connects KY 94 to U.S. Route 51.

==== Major intersections ====
The entire route is in Fulton County.

Location	mi	km	Destinations	Notes
	0.000	0.000	US 51	Southern terminus
	0.312	0.502	KY 94	Northern terminus
1.000 mi = 1.609 km; 1.000 km = 0.621 mi
