= Kentucky Route 307 =

State highway in USA

Kentucky Route 307
- KY 307 highlighted in red

Route information
- Maintained by KYTC
- Length: 28.616 mi (46.053 km)

Major junctions
- South end: SR 43 / KY 129 in Fulton
- US 45 in Fulton; I-69 in Fulton; KY 94 north of Fulton; KY 58 in Fulgham; KY 80 near Milburn; KY 121 north of Kirbyton
- North end: US 62 east of Cunningham

Location
- Country: United States
- State: Kentucky
- Counties: Fulton, Hickman, Carlisle

Highway system
- Kentucky State Highway System; Interstate; US; State; Parkways
← KY 306	→ KY 308

Kentucky Route 307 (KY 307) is a 28.3-mile-long (45.5 km) state highway in the U.S. state of Kentucky. The highway connects mostly rural areas of Fulton, Hickman, and Carlisle counties with Fulton.

== Route description ==
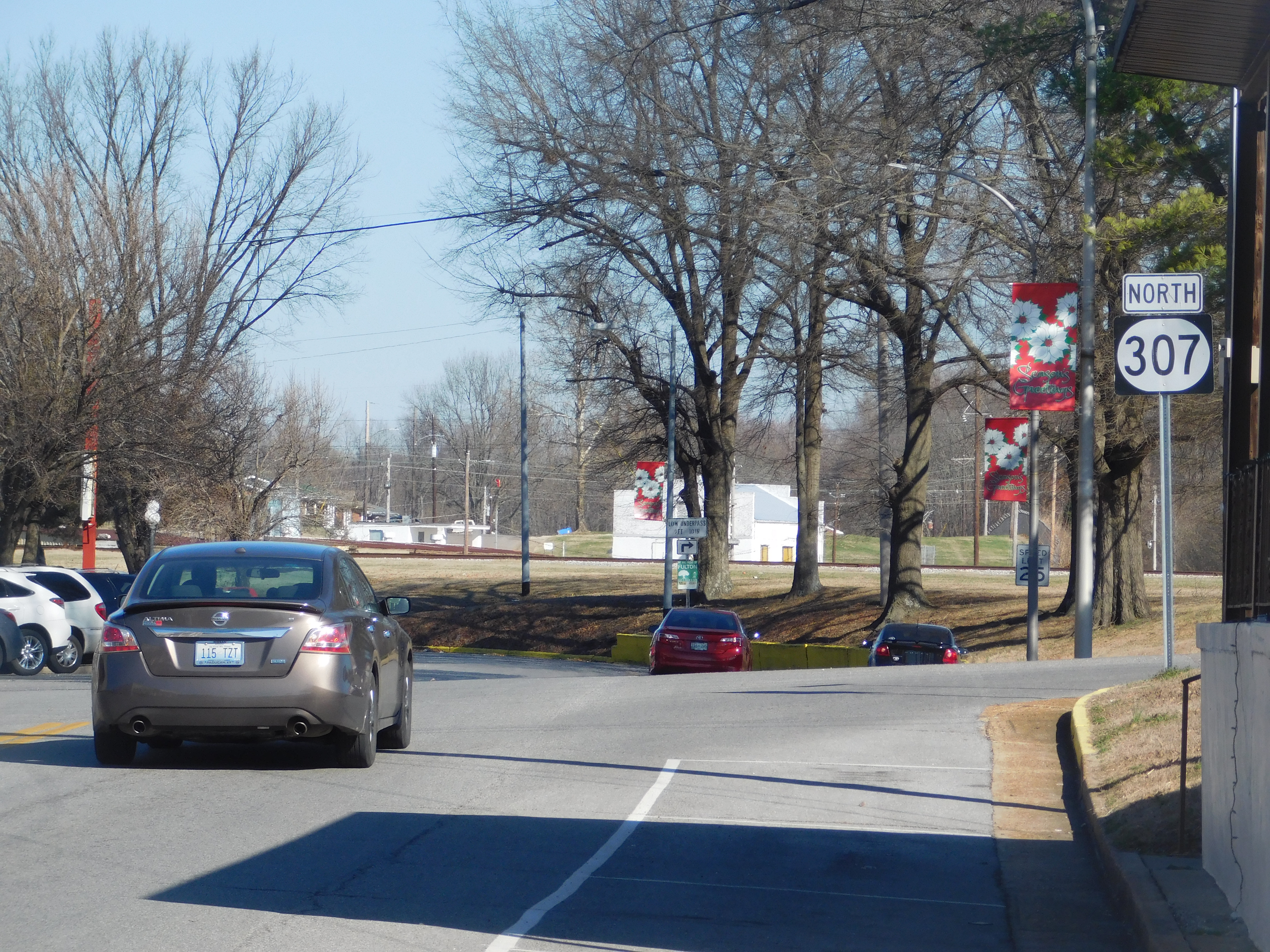
KY 307 northbound from KY 116 in Fulton

=== Fulton County ===
KY 307 begins at the Tennessee state line, at an intersection with KY 129 (State Line Highway) on the South Fulton, Tennessee–Fulton, Kentucky line, within Fulton County, where the roadway continues as Tennessee State Route 43 (Broadway). It travels to the north and curves to the northwest. Immediately, it intersects the eastern terminus of KY 116 (Lake Street). KY 307 turns right onto Lake Street, and travels to the northeast. It travels under a railroad bridge that carries railroad tracks of the Central Illinois Railroad (CIR). It turns left, to the northwest, and crosses over Harris Fork Creek. It curves to the north and has a very brief concurrency with U.S. Route 45 (US 45; Mayfield Road). After they split, KY 307 heads to the north-northeast, traveling along the northeastern edge of Fulton, curves to the north, and has an interchange with the Purchase Parkway [future Interstate 69 (I-69)]. The highway continues to the north and leaves the city and then enters Hickman County.

=== Hickman County ===
KY 307 has an intersection with KY 94. At this intersection, it passes Enon Cemetery. The highway curves to the northwest, crosses over some CIR railroad tracks, and curves to the north. It intersects the northern terminus of KY 1698 (Johnson Road). It crosses over Cane Creek and then intersects KY 924 (Kirby Road). The highway crosses over Pond Branch and intersects KY 1529 (Moscow Water Valley Road). At this intersection, it passes Wesley Cemetery. It crosses over Bayou de Chien and Sand Creek. It then has a brief overlap with KY 944 and passes Clark Cemetery. Then, it enters Fulgham, where it intersects KY 58. It continues to the north and intersects the eastern terminus of KY 1708. In Nichols, the highway intersects both the eastern terminus of KY 123 and the northern terminus of KY 3061. After an intersection with the eastern terminus of KY 703, it begins to travel along the eastern edge of the Obion Creek Wildlife Management Area. It crosses over Obion Creek and then leaves the WMA. In Beulah, it intersects the western terminus of KY 1748. It then enters Carlisle County.

=== Carlisle County ===
KY 307 curves to the north-northeast and crosses over Little Creek. It then curves back to the north and intersects KY 80. It then intersects the eastern terminus of KY 1173. The highway travels through Kirbyton and intersects the western terminus of KY 548. It then passes Kirbyton Cemetery and intersects KY 408. It intersects KY 121 and then crosses over Lick Creek. The highway intersects the western terminus of KY 849. It curves to the northwest and meets its northern terminus, an intersection with US 62.

== Major intersections ==
County	Location	mi	km	Destinations	Notes
Kentucky–Tennessee line		0.000	0.000	SR 43 south – Jackson	Continuation into Tennessee
Kentucky–Tennessee line		0.020	0.032	KY 129 (State Line Street) – Dukedom, Murray	
Fulton	Fulton	0.079	0.127	KY 116 west (Lake Street west) to US 51	KYTC signage for KY 307 begins here
Fulton	Fulton	0.243	0.391	KY 1718 north (4th Street)	
Fulton	Fulton	0.751	1.209	US 45 south (Mayfield Road) to US 51 – South Fulton	Southern end of US 45 overlap
Fulton	Fulton	1.301	2.094	US 45 north (Mayfield Road) – Mayfield	Northern end of US 45 overlap
Fulton	Fulton	1.783– 1.821	2.869– 2.931	I-69 to US 51 – Mayfield	I-69 exit 2
Hickman		3.640	5.858	KY 94	
Hickman		4.672	7.519	KY 1698 south (Johnson Road)	Northern terminus of KY 1698
Hickman		4.354	7.007	KY 924 (Kirby Road)	
Hickman		6.579	10.588	KY 1529 (Moscow Water Valley Road)	
Hickman		9.195	14.798	KY 944 west	Southern end of KY 944 overlap
Hickman		9.301	14.969	KY 944 east	Northern end of KY 944 overlap
Hickman	Fulgham	11.043	17.772	KY 58	
Hickman		12.331	19.845	KY 1708 west	Eastern terminus of KY 1708
Hickman	Nichols	13.908	22.383	KY 123 west / KY 3061 south	Eastern terminus of KY 123; northern terminus of KY 3061
Hickman		14.922	24.015	KY 703 west	Eastern terminus of KY 703
Hickman	Beulah	19.014	30.600	KY 1748 east	Western terminus of KY 1748
Carlisle		21.206	34.128	KY 80	
Carlisle		23.080	37.144	KY 1173 west	Eastern terminus of KY 1173
Carlisle		24.432	39.319	KY 548 east	Western terminus of KY 548
Carlisle		24.952	40.156	KY 408	
Carlisle		26.010	41.859	KY 121	
Carlisle		27.027	43.496	KY 849 east	Western terminus of KY 849
Carlisle		28.616	46.053	US 62 – Bardwell, Paducah	Northern terminus
1.000 mi = 1.609 km; 1.000 km = 0.621 mi: Concurrency terminus; Route transition
