= National Register of Historic Places listings in Hickman County, Kentucky =

Location of Hickman County in Kentucky

This is a list of the National Register of Historic Places listings in Hickman County, Kentucky.

It is intended to be a complete list of the properties on the National Register of Historic Places in Hickman County, Kentucky, United States. The locations of National Register properties for which the latitude and longitude coordinates are included below, may be seen in a map.

There are 5 properties listed on the National Register in the county.

This National Park Service list is complete through NPS recent listings posted April 17, 2026.

== Current listings ==
	Name on the Register	Image	Date listed	Location	City or town	Description
1	Burcham Site (15HI15)		March 22, 1990 (#90000479)	2 miles (3.2 km) north of the Adams Site on the Mississippi River bluff edge 36°38′04″N 89°06′24″W	Clinton	
2	Columbus-Belmont Civil War State Park	Columbus-Belmont Civil War State Park	May 9, 1973 (#73000806)	On U.S. Route 80; 36°45′56″N 89°06′25″W	Columbus	
3	First Christian Church	First Christian Church	February 11, 2016 (#16000005)	201 N. Washington St. 36°40′06″N 88°59′38″W	Clinton	1899-built Romanesque Revival church
4	Hickman County Courthouse	Hickman County Courthouse	September 11, 1975 (#75000767)	Court Sq. 36°40′00″N 88°59′39″W	Clinton	
5	Marvin College Boys Dormitory	Marvin College Boys Dormitory	January 2, 1976 (#76000897)	404 and 416 N. Washington St. 36°40′20″N 88°59′34″W	Clinton	

== See also ==
- List of National Historic Landmarks in Kentucky
- National Register of Historic Places listings in Kentucky
