= U.S. Route 51 in Kentucky =

Section of U.S. Highway in Kentucky, United States

U.S. Route 51
- US 51 highlighted in red

Route information
- Maintained by KYTC
- Length: 42.155 mi (67.842 km)

Major junctions
- South end: Future I-69 / US 51 at South Fulton, TN
- I-69 in Fulton; KY 94 north of Fulton; KY 58 in Clinton; KY 80 in Arlington; US 62 in Bardwell; KY 121 in Wickliffe; US 60 in Wickliffe
- North end: US 51 / US 60 / US 62 at Cairo, IL

Location
- Country: United States
- State: Kentucky
- Counties: Fulton, Hickman, Carlisle, Ballard

Highway system
- United States Numbered Highway System; List; Special; Divided; Kentucky State Highway System; Interstate; US; State; Parkways
← KY 50	→ US 52

U.S. Route 51 (US 51) in Kentucky runs 42 miles (68 km) through the western portion of the state from the Tennessee state line at Fulton to the Illinois state line at Cairo, Illinois. It is a mostly rural route, also serving the towns of Clinton, Arlington, Bardwell and Wickliffe. It also carries part of the Great River Road near the northern end of its route in Kentucky.

== Route description ==
US 51 mainly runs through the Jackson Purchase region of Kentucky, spanning the four westernmost counties in Kentucky, beginning with a four-lane section crossing the state line, which begins a concurrency with the I-69. US 51 follows I-69's first two miles (3.2 km) to exit 1 north of Fulton.

North of Fulton, US 51 follows a path from Fulton County, and traverses Hickman, Carlisle and Ballard counties, including going through their respective county seats, Clinton, Bardwell, and Wickliffe. At Bardwell, US 62 begins running concurrently with US 51. US 60 joins in on the overlap just before crossing the Ohio River into Alexander County, Illinois just south of Cairo.

Portions of US 51/US 62 in Carlisle and Ballard counties are part of the Great River Road National Scenic Byway.

== Major intersections ==
County	Location	mi	km	Destinations	Notes
Fulton	Fulton	0.000	0.000	Future I-69 south / US 51 south	Continuation south into Tennessee; southern terminus of I-69; southern end of I-69 concurrency
Fulton	Fulton	0.030	0.048	KY 116 / KY 166 – Fulton, Hickman	I-69 exit 0
Fulton	Fulton	1.424	2.292	I-69 north / KY 1648 north – Mayfield	Northern end of I-69 concurrency; northern terminus of KY 1648; I-69 exit 1
Fulton	Fulton	1.654	2.662	KY 2767 west (Holiday Lane)	To Parkway Regional Hospital
Fulton	Fulton	1.721	2.770	KY 2149 west (Airport Road)	To Fulton Airport
Fulton		3.497	5.628	KY 94 Conn. south	Signed KY 94C; short connector road to KY 94
Fulton		3.924	6.315	KY 94 – Hickman, Murray	
Fulton		5.944	9.566	KY 924 east	Southern end of KY 924 concurrency
Hickman		6.287	10.118	KY 924 west	Northern end of KY 924 concurrency
Hickman		6.968	11.214	KY 1070 north	Southern terminus of KY 1070
Hickman		9.145	14.717	KY 1529 (Moscow Water Valley Road)	
Hickman		9.861	15.870	KY 2209 east (Gwynn Road)	Western terminus of KY 2209
Hickman		11.186	18.002	KY 780 east	Southern end of KY 780 concurrency
Hickman		11.288	18.166	KY 780 west	Northern terminus of KY 780 concurrency
Hickman	Clinton	13.256	21.333	KY 780 east	Western terminus of KY 780
Hickman	Clinton	13.756	22.138	KY 58 east (Mayfield Road) – Mayfield	Southern end of KY 58 concurrency
Hickman	Clinton	13.874	22.328	KY 58 west / KY 123 (East Clay Street/West Clay Street)	Northern end of KY 58 concurrency
Hickman	Clinton	14.108	22.705	KY 1745 east (James Phillips Drive)	Western terminus of KY 1745
Hickman	Clinton	14.153	22.777	KY 1826 west (Depot Street)	Eastern terminus of KY 1826
Hickman	Clinton	14.318	23.043	KY 1728 west	Eastern terminus of KY 1728
Hickman	Clinton	14.383	23.147	KY 703 east (Spring Street)	Western terminus of KY 703
Hickman		15.016	24.166	KY 1728 west	Eastern terminus of KY 1728
Hickman		16.416	26.419	KY 1540 west	Eastern terminus of KY 1540
Hickman		17.224	27.719	KY 1301 north	Southern terminus of KY 1301
Hickman		18.646	30.008	KY 288 east	Western terminus of KY 288
Carlisle	Arlington	22.473	36.167	KY 80 – Mayfield, Columbus, Columbus-Belmont State Park	
Carlisle	Arlington	22.891	36.839	KY 877 west – Berkley	Eastern terminus of KY 877
Carlisle		27.337	43.995	KY 1377 south – Carlisle County High School	Northern terminus of KY 1377
Carlisle		27.828	44.785	KY 1181 north	Southern terminus of KY 1181
Carlisle	Bardwell	28.697	46.183	KY 123 south (Elsey Avenue) – Columbus, Columbus-Belmont State Park	Northern terminus of KY 123
Carlisle	Bardwell	29.076	46.793	US 62 east (Paducah Road) – Paducah	Southern end of US 62 concurrency
Carlisle		31.840	51.242	KY 1022 south	Northern terminus of KY 1022
Carlisle		32.055	51.588	KY 1203 south / Great River Road	Northern terminus of KY 1203; southern end of Great River Road concurrency
Ballard	Wickliffe	37.234	59.922	KY 121 south (Court Street) to KY 286	Northern terminus of KY 121
Ballard	Wickliffe	37.502	60.354	US 60 east (4th Street) to I-24	Southern end of US 60 concurrency
Ohio River		41.251– 42.155	66.387– 67.842	Cairo Ohio River Bridge	
Ohio River		41.251– 42.155	66.387– 67.842	US 51 north / US 60 west / US 62 west / Great River Road (National Route)	Continuation into Illinois
1.000 mi = 1.609 km; 1.000 km = 0.621 mi: Concurrency terminus

U.S. Route 51
Previous state: Tennessee	Kentucky	Next state: Illinois
