= Kentucky Route 58 =

State highway in Kentucky, United States

Kentucky Route 58
- KY 58 highlighted in red

Route information
- Maintained by KYTC
- Length: 56.845 mi (91.483 km)

Major junctions
- West end: former ferry landing near Columbus
- KY 80 / KY 123 / Great River Road in Columbus; US 51 in Clinton; US 45 near Pryorsburg; US 641 in Benton
- East end: US 68 near Briensburg

Location
- Country: United States
- State: Kentucky
- Counties: Hickman, Graves, Marshall

Highway system
- Kentucky State Highway System; Interstate; US; State; Parkways
← KY 57	→ KY 59

Kentucky Route 58 (KY 58) is a 56.845-mile-long (91.483 km) state highway in Kentucky that runs from a dead end near Columbus to U.S. Route 68 (US 68) near Briensburg, Kentucky via Columbus, Clinton, Mayfield, and Benton.

== Route description ==
KY 58 begins at a ferry landing on the Mississippi River in Columbus, in Hickman County, where KY 80 used to connect with Missouri Route 80 at Belmont, Missouri. Following a short concurrency with KY 123, KY 58 begins turning southeast to Clinton After a brief concurrency with US 51, it continues eastward into Graves County where it traverses the Purchase Parkway (Future I-69), and begins a concurrency US 45 from Pryorsburg to downtown Mayfield.

KY 58 leaves US 45 by turning onto East Broadway and continues eastward to Marshall County, where it turns northeastward to Benton KY 58 joins US 641 to head towards Draffenville, but end that concurrency by turning east onto Briensburg Road about a couple of miles short of the town proper. KY 58 ends at US 68 in Briensburg.

== History ==
Kentucky Route 58 was part of the initial Commonwealth of Kentucky highway numbering plan developed in the early 1920s as a primary east–west route through far western Kentucky. The original route began at Kentucky Route 93 in Eddyville, located in Lyon County, and immediately crossed the Cumberland River via ferry. The route exited Lyon County via a ferry over the Tennessee River into Marshall County at Birmingham, and continued west to Briensburg via US 68 from just southeast of Briensburg. where it joined its modern-day eastern terminus. The route continued via its modern-day route through Benton, Mayfield and Clinton. The route exited Kentucky via a ferry over the Lower Mississippi River at Columbus into Missouri.

== Major intersections ==
County	Location	mi	km	Destinations	Notes
Hickman		0.000	0.000		Dead end near the Mississippi River
Hickman	Columbus	0.445	0.716	KY 1757 north (Polk Circle) – Columbus Belmont State Park	Southern terminus of KY 1757
Hickman	Columbus	0.530	0.853	West Hoover Parkway (KY 3058 north)	Southern terminus of KY 3058
Hickman	Columbus	0.573	0.922	KY 80 east / KY 123 north / Great River Road (Eastern Route) north (East Hoover Parkway)	Western terminus of KY 80; west end of KY 123/GRR overlap
Hickman	Columbus	0.761	1.225	KY 123 south / Great River Road (Eastern Route) south – Oakton	East end of KY 123 overlap
Hickman		2.645	4.257	KY 1300 south	Northern terminus of KY 1300
Hickman		4.375	7.041	KY 1772 north	Southern terminus of KY 1772
Hickman		6.273	10.095	KY 1540 east	Western terminus of KY 1540
Hickman		7.892	12.701	KY 1475 west	Eastern terminus of KY 1475
Hickman		9.085	14.621	KY 1826 west	West end of KY 1826 overlap
Hickman		9.105	14.653	KY 1826 east – Clinton	East end of KY 1826 overlap
Hickman		9.490	15.273	KY 123 north – Moscow, Cayce	West end of KY 123 overlap
Hickman	Clinton	10.146	16.328	US 51 north (Washington Street) / KY 123 south (East Clay Street) – Arlington	East end of KY 123 overlap; west end of US 51 concurrency; 51 also signed as GRR alternate route
Hickman	Clinton	10.264	16.518	US 51 south (Washington Street) – Fulton	East end of US 51 concurrency
Hickman	Clinton	10.330	16.625	KY 1731 north (South Waterfield Drive) – Hickman County High School	Southern terminus of KY 1731
Hickman		13.473	21.683	KY 780 west	Eastern terminus of KY 780
Hickman		14.034	22.586	KY 2208 north	Southern terminus of KY 2208
Hickman		15.978	25.714	KY 575 north	Southern terminus of KY 575
Hickman		16.460	26.490	KY 944 east	Western terminus of KY 944
Hickman	Fulgham	17.590	28.308	KY 307 to US 62 – Fulton	
Hickman		19.635	31.599	KY 3061 south	Northern terminus of KY 3061
Graves		21.045	33.869	KY 1283 south	Northern terminus of KY 1283
Graves	Holifield	22.218	35.756	KY 339 north	West end of KY 339 overlap
Graves	Holifield	22.245	35.800	KY 339 south to I-69	East end of KY 339 overlap
Graves		26.094	41.994	US 45 to I-69 – Fulton	West end of US 45 concurrency
Graves		26.750	43.050	KY 1748	
Graves	Mayfield	30.362	48.863	US 45 Byp. north – Paducah	Southern terminus of US 45 Bypass
Graves	Mayfield	32.897	52.943	US 45 north (North 7th Street) / KY 80 Bus. west to I-69 (West Broadway Street) – Murray, Arlington	East end of US 45 concurrency; eastern terminus of KY 80 business route
Graves	Mayfield	32.961	53.046	KY 121 Bus. south (South 6th Street)	Northern terminus of KY 121 business route
Graves	Mayfield	33.811	54.414	KY 121 to KY 80 east / I-69 – Murray, Wickliffe	
Graves		34.586	55.661	KY 1710 east	Western terminus of KY 1710
Graves		35.523	57.169	KY 131 north to I-69	Southern terminus of KY 131
Graves		36.459	58.675	KY 1821 north (Airport Drive) – Mayfield-Graves County Airport	Southern terminus of KY 1821
Graves		39.487	63.548	KY 301 north	Southern terminus of KY 301
Graves		41.672	67.065	KY 564 south	Northern terminus of KY 564
Marshall		43.993	70.800	KY 2603 north (Vanzora Road)	Southern terminus of KY 2603
Marshall		44.404	71.461	KY 402 east (Brewers Highway) – Kenlake State Resort Park	Western terminus of KY 402
Marshall		45.604	73.393	KY 1522 south (Soldier Creek Road)	Northern terminus of KY 1522
Marshall	Harvey	47.057	75.731	KY 1949 (Wadesboro Road)	
Marshall		49.010	78.874	KY 2606 (Jackson School Road)	
Marshall	Benton	50.384	81.085	KY 1311 south (Slickback Road)	Northern terminus of KY 1311
Marshall	Benton	50.450	81.191	US 641 Spur to I-69 / I-24 – Mayfield, Fulton, Calvert City	
Marshall	Benton	52.294	84.159	US 641 south (Main Street)	
Marshall	Benton	52.343	84.238	KY 408 east (East 12th Street) / Poplar Street	West end of KY 408 overlap and US 641 North concurrency
Marshall	Benton	52.631	84.701	KY 408 west (Harold King Drive)	East end of KY 408 overlap
Marshall	Benton	52.888	85.115	KY 348 west (West 5th Street) / US 641 south / KY 58 west (Main Street)	Eastern terminus of KY 348; end of one-way split of 641/58
Marshall	Benton	52.992	85.282	KY 2609 east (East 4th Street)	Western terminus of KY 2609
Marshall		55.541	89.385	US 641 north / KY 795 west (Scale Road) – Draffenville, Scale	East end of US 641 concurrency
Marshall		56.629	91.136	KY 1477	
Marshall		56.845	91.483	US 68	Eastern terminus
1.000 mi = 1.609 km; 1.000 km = 0.621 mi: Concurrency terminus
