= Buland =

Buland is a surname. Notable people with the surname include:

- Harry M. Buland (1884–1933), American football and basketball coach
- Jean-Eugène Buland (1852–1926), French painter
- Ludvik Buland (1893–1945), Norwegian trade unionist
- Mable E. Buland Campbell (1885–1961), American educator
- Walt Buland (1892–1937), American football player
