= Kentucky Route 309 =

State highway in Kentucky, United States

Kentucky Route 309
- KY 309 highlighted in red

Route information
- Maintained by KYTC
- Length: 4.872 mi (7.841 km)

Major junctions
- South end: Mt. Olive Road in rural Obion Co, TN
- North end: KY 94 and Broadway Street in Hickman

Location
- Country: United States
- State: Kentucky
- Counties: Fulton

Highway system
- Kentucky State Highway System; Interstate; US; State; Parkways
← KY 308	→ KY 310

Kentucky Route 309 (KY 309) is a 4.872-mile-long (7.841 km) state highway in Fulton County, Kentucky, that runs from Mt. Olive Road in rural Obion County, Tennessee, northwest of Woodland Mills immediately south of the Kentucky–Tennessee state line to KY 94 and Broadway Street in Hickman. KY 309 is unlike most state routes, as its first 143 feet (0.044 km) of mileage is located in Tennessee, making it one of just a few select Kentucky state routes that have mileage in another state.

== Major intersections ==
County	Location	mi	km	Destinations	Notes
Obion		0.000	0.000	Mt. Olive Road	Southern terminus
Fulton		2.163	3.481	KY 925 south	Northern terminus of KY 925
Fulton	Hickman	4.224	6.798	KY 1099 (7th Street)	
Fulton	Hickman	4.872	7.841	KY 94 (Catlett Street) / Broadway Street	Northern terminus; continues beyond KY 94 as Broadway Street
Fulton	1.000 mi = 1.609 km; 1.000 km = 0.621 mi				
