= Fulton Airport =

Airport in Kentucky, US

- IATA: none; ICAO: none; FAA LID: 1M7

Summary
- Airport type: Public
- Owner: Fulton City & County
- Serves: Fulton, Kentucky
- Elevation AMSL: 400 ft (120 m)
- Coordinates: 36°31′33″N 088°54′56″W
- Interactive map of Fulton Airport

Runways
Direction	Length		Surface
Direction	ft	m	Surface
9/27	2,700	823	Asphalt

Statistics (2006)
- Aircraft operations: 7,375
- Based aircraft: 10
- Source: Federal Aviation Administration

Fulton Airport (FAA LID: 1M7) is a public use airport located two nautical miles (4 km) northwest of the central business district of Fulton, in Fulton County, Kentucky, United States. It is owned by Fulton City & County.

== Facilities and aircraft ==
Fulton Airport covers an area of 85 acres (34 ha) at an elevation of 400 feet (122 m) above mean sea level. It has one asphalt paved runway designated 9/27 which measures 2,700 by 60 feet (823 x 18 m).

For the 12-month period ending January 30, 2006, the airport had 7,375 aircraft operations, an average of 20 per day: 98% general aviation, 1% air taxi and 1% military. At that time there were 10 aircraft based at this airport: 70% single-engine and 30% multi-engine.

== See also ==
- List of airports in Kentucky
