= Peerless-Premier Appliance Company =

American appliance manufacturer

- Industry: 363198 - Household Cooking Equipment (Mfrs); 335221 - Household Cooking Appliance Manufacturing
- Predecessor: Premier Stove Company; Peerless Enamel Products Company
- Founded: 1982
- Headquarters: Belleville, Illinois, United States
- Key people: Alex Volansky, CEO; William Sprague, Owner
- Products: Electric and Gas Ranges
- Revenue: $32,500,000 - $35,000,000
- Number of employees: 100 to 249

The Peerless-Premier Appliance Company is an appliance manufacturer located in Belleville, Illinois, United States, that manufactures kitchen ranges for residential use.

== History ==
=== 1873-1974 ===
The history of Peerless-Premier is closely intertwined with the metal working and foundry industry in Belleville, Illinois. The first stove foundry in Belleville was built in 1873. By 1915, there were 15 large foundries in Belleville of which seven were exclusively casting stoves. Over time there were new foundries built, foundries that went out of business, others that were merged, or names and assets transferred, making the history of the foundry business in Bellville rather non-linear.

The history of 'Peerless-Premier' can be traced primarily to two companies: The Premier Stove Company and the Peerless Enamel Products Co. although elements of other foundries would also eventually become part of the company.

The Premier Stove Company was founded in Belleville, in 1912 by Maurice G. Klemme and Arthur C. Krebs. In 1915, the Father and brother of Maurice Klemme, Gottlieb and Alvin, located the Cabirange Stove Manufacturing Company in Belleville.

The Peerless Enamel Products Co. was founded in 1928. This company was exclusively a contract enameling company and did not have a foundry or produce finished stoves.

During World War II, Premier had a contract for bomb casings.

=== 1975-present ===
In November, 1975, Peerless acquired all capital stock of Premier. Premier was a wholly owned subsidiary of Peerless until January 1982, when the current company was formed by combining the operating units into one company.

In 1981, Peerless-Premier purchased the Eagle Product line. The Eagle name was first used in Belleville by a foundry built in 1883 by Gottlieb D. Klemme and William Schott. At one time, Eagle had an annual output of over 100,000 ranges and heaters.

In 1990, the company acquired assets of Top Shelf, a manufacturer of stands that allowed a microwave oven to be stacked above a range.

A fire at the Belleville plant in 1997 damaged the enameling furnace forcing the plant to shut down and furlough about 380 workers. Production resumed after making arrangements with four different porcelainizing suppliers with a planned production levels of 950 ranges per day.

It was reported in 2004 that Peerless-Premier received a grant of $44,000 from the State of Illinois for employee training based on 2003 revenues of $55,555,555.

In 2005 Peerless-Premier laid off 100 of its 250 workers in Belleville, IL and moved the jobs to Clinton, KY citing more favorable wages and competition from Mexico.

By 2013, of the previously numerous stove manufacturers in Belleville, there remained only two descendants: Peerless-Premier and Empire Comfort Systems (formerly Empire Stove).

== Current Products ==
The company currently manufactures a wide range of electric and gas ranges under the Premier name and manufactures a microwave accessory shelf under the Top Shelf trade name.

Electric ranges are available in 20, 24 and 30" widths. Gas ranges are available in 20, 24, 30 and 36" widths.

There is also a Pro-series line of gas ranges in 20 to 36" widths.

The products are marketed through various retail outlets, including Best Buy, Home Depot, and AJ Madison.

== Patents and Trademarks ==
As is common with many corporations, the company applied for and was granted patents for its products over the course of its existence. It has also become the assignee for patents for companies that it has acquired.

=== Invention Patents ===
U.S. patent 5,323,759 Sealed burner mounting assembly

=== Registered Trademarks ===
1. U.S. Trademark 72,365,778 Premier
2. U.S. Trademark 77,621,391 Top Shelf
