= Travelers Protective Association of America =

Fraternal benefit and service club in the United States

The Travelers Protective Association of America is a fraternal benefit and service club in the United States. The organization was originally created by and for traveling salesmen though today it is open to other occupational groups.

== History ==
In January 1882, a meeting was held by a small group of traveling salesmen at a hotel in Chicago to discuss forming a cooperative society to address the issues facing their profession. The Travelers Protective Association of the United States was formally established on June 24, 1882, in Bellefontaine, Ohio. Its original goals were to obtain special concessions from hotels, railroads and transportation agencies and advocated on behalf of their members if they had a grievance. By 1890, however, the group was on the verge of financial collapse and felt that it could only remain active if it added an accident insurance benefit. That same year the organization moved its headquarters from Chicago to St. Louis and changed its name slightly to its current form.

Originally only open to executives of manufacturing, wholesale or "jobbing" businesses and their sales representatives, by 1979 it was open to all male traveling salesmen between 18 and 55 and people from other occupational groups could be admitted by a special review of the board of directors. The organization had 191,000 members in 1968, 236,000 in 1979 and 161,000 in 1995. Women were accepted as members of the TPAA effective January 1, 1993.

The association is set up on the typical three-tiered fraternal system. Local chapters are known as "posts", state groups are called "state divisions". The national organization is based in St. Louis. In 1979 the TPAA had 290 posts. Currently the association has 35 state divisions, 261 posts and is licensed to sell insurance in 38 states.

The initiation ritual is simple and brief – the chairman of the post leads the members in prayer and reads a short discourse.

The TPAA has been successful in getting laws passed for sanitary conditions in hotels and for driving training laws. In 1946 it inaugurated an annual Child Accident Prevention Week. In 1966 it amended its constitution to provide for a community services chairman in each post. Its local posts award scholarships and other grants.

Buildings associated with the TPA of A include:

- First Christian Church (1899), Clinton, Kentucky, listed on the National Register of Historic Places, whose stained glass windows acknowledge TPA of A patrons.

== See also ==
- List of North American fraternal benefit orders
- Order of United Commercial Travelers of America
