= Riceville =

Riceville may refer to:

- Riceville, Iowa
- Riceville, Fulton County, Kentucky
- Riceville, Kentucky (Johnson County)
- Riceville, Louisiana
- Riceville, Maine, a ghost town
- Riceville, Montana
- Riceville, Pennsylvania
- Riceville, Tennessee
