= Marvin College Boys Dormitory and President's House =

- U.S. National Register of Historic Places
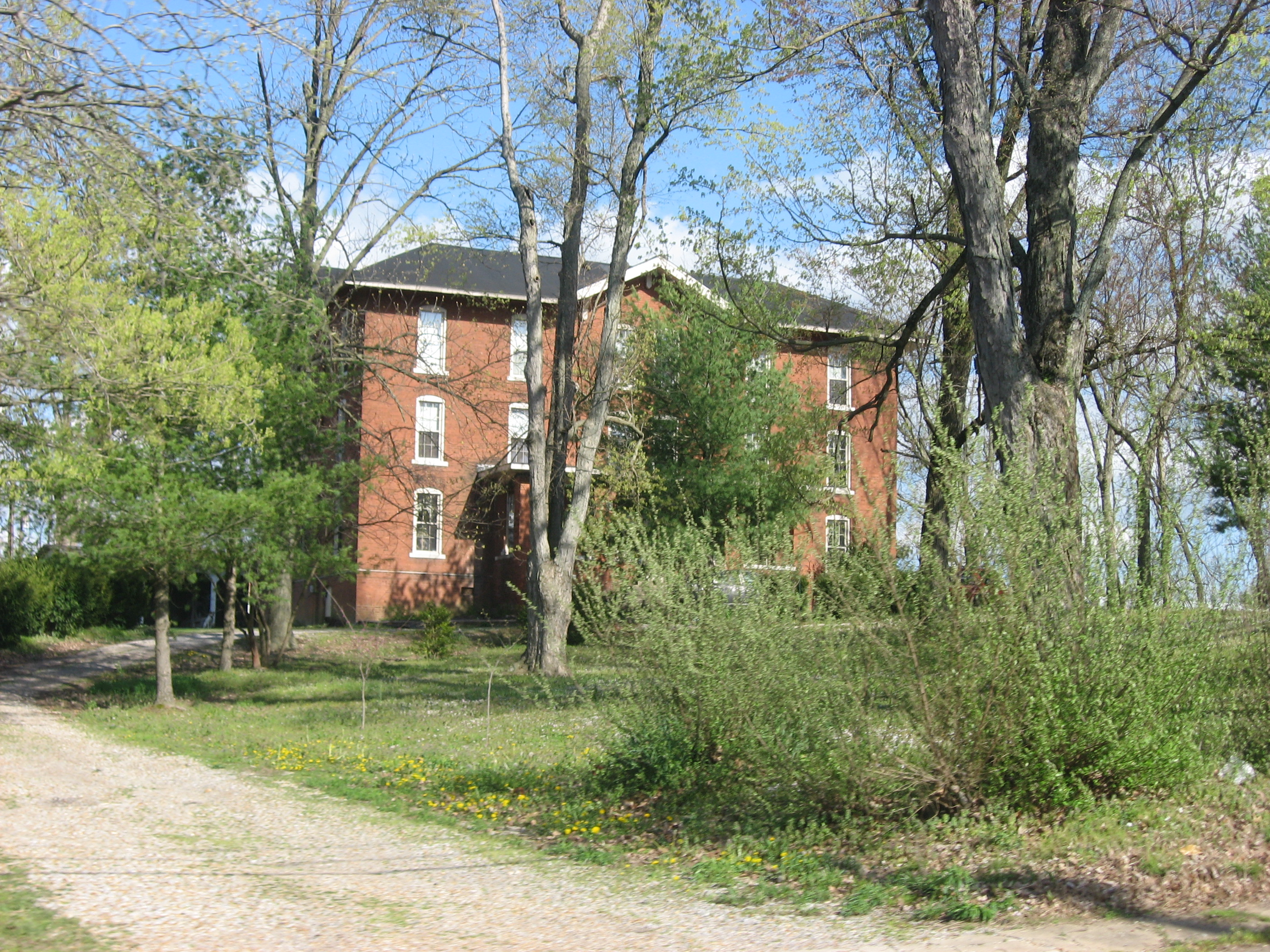
- Location: 404 and 416 N. Washington St., Clinton, Kentucky
- Coordinates: 36°40′20″N 88°59′34″W
- Area: 2 acres (0.81 ha)
- Built: 1899-1900 (house); 1910 (dormitory)
- NRHP reference No.: 76000897
- Added to NRHP: January 2, 1976

The Marvin College Boys Dormitory and President's House, in Clinton, Kentucky, United States, was listed on the National Register of Historic Places. The listing includes two contributing buildings, at 404 and 416 N. Washington St.

The president's house was built in 1899–1900; the dormitory was built in 1910. The dormitory was later used as Hotel Jewell. The two buildings are the only surviving buildings of Marvin College.

== See also ==
- Clinton College (Kentucky): Also in Clinton, Kentucky
- National Register of Historic Places listings in Hickman County, Kentucky
