= Mable =

Mable may refer to:

- Mable (business), a U.S. business accelerator
- Mable (name), list of people with the name

== See also ==
- Mabgate, from Mable-gate, Mable being a middle English reference to 'loose women'
- Mabel (disambiguation)
- Maple (disambiguation)
