= Mable (name) =

Mable is a feminine given name and a surname. Notable people with the name include:

== Given name ==
- Mable Burton Ringling (1875–1929), American art collector
- Mable Electa Buland Campbell (1885–1961), American English professor
- Mable Elmore, Canadian politician
- Mable Fergerson (born 1955), American athlete
- Mable Hillery (1929–1976), American singer
- Mable Howard (1905–1994), American community leader
- Mable John (1930–2022), American blues vocalist
- Mable Lee (1921–2019), American musician
- Mable Mathews, American politician
- Mable Parker McLean (1922–2012), American academic administrator
- Mable Thomas (born 1957), American politician

=== Middle name ===
- Doris Mable Cochran (1898–1968), American herpetologist

== Surname ==
- Bob Mable (1885–1960), Australian rugby league footballer
- Robert Mable, founder of Mableton, Georgia

== See also ==
- Mable (disambiguation)
