= Jesse Whitesell House and Farm =

Historic house in Kentucky, United States

- U.S. National Register of Historic Places
- U.S. Historic district
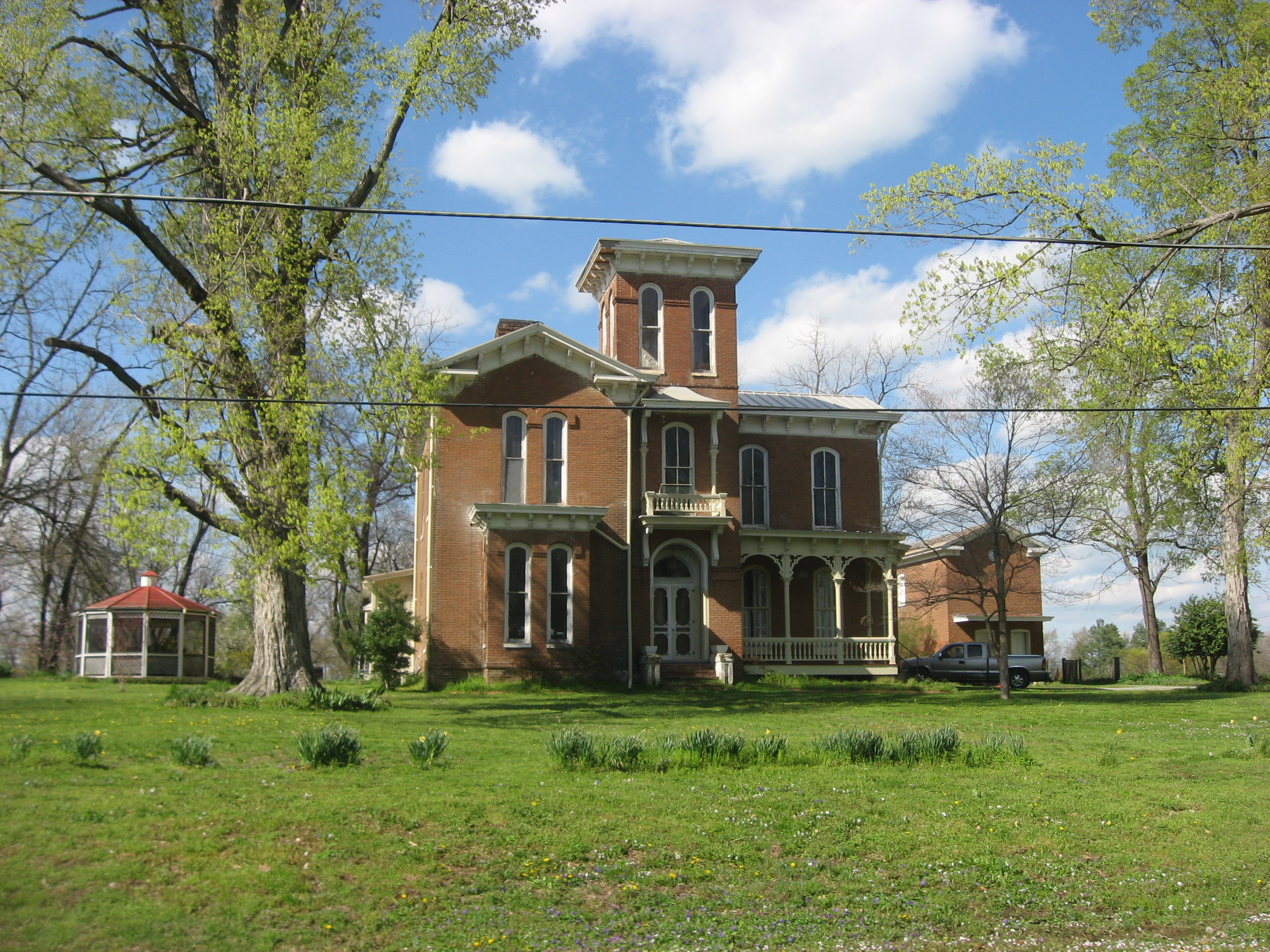
- Jesse Whitesell House

- Location within Kentucky Location within the United States
- Nearest city: Fulton, Kentucky
- Coordinates: 36°30′10″N 88°54′6″W
- Area: 2 acres (0.81 ha) (house); 215 acres (87 ha) (farm)
- Built: 1868
- Architectural style: Italian Villa
- NRHP reference No.: 77000619 (original); 06001199 (increase)

Significant dates
- Added to NRHP: August 29, 1977 (house)
- Boundary increase: February 4, 2009 (farm)

The Jesse Whitesell House and Farm is a historic property in Fulton County, Kentucky, and Obion County, Tennessee. The house, which is located in Kentucky, was listed on the National Register of Historic Places in 1977. The associated farm was added to the National Register in 2009 as a historic district. The historic district includes about 215 acres (87 ha) of land that spans the state line, five contributing buildings and five other contributing sites.

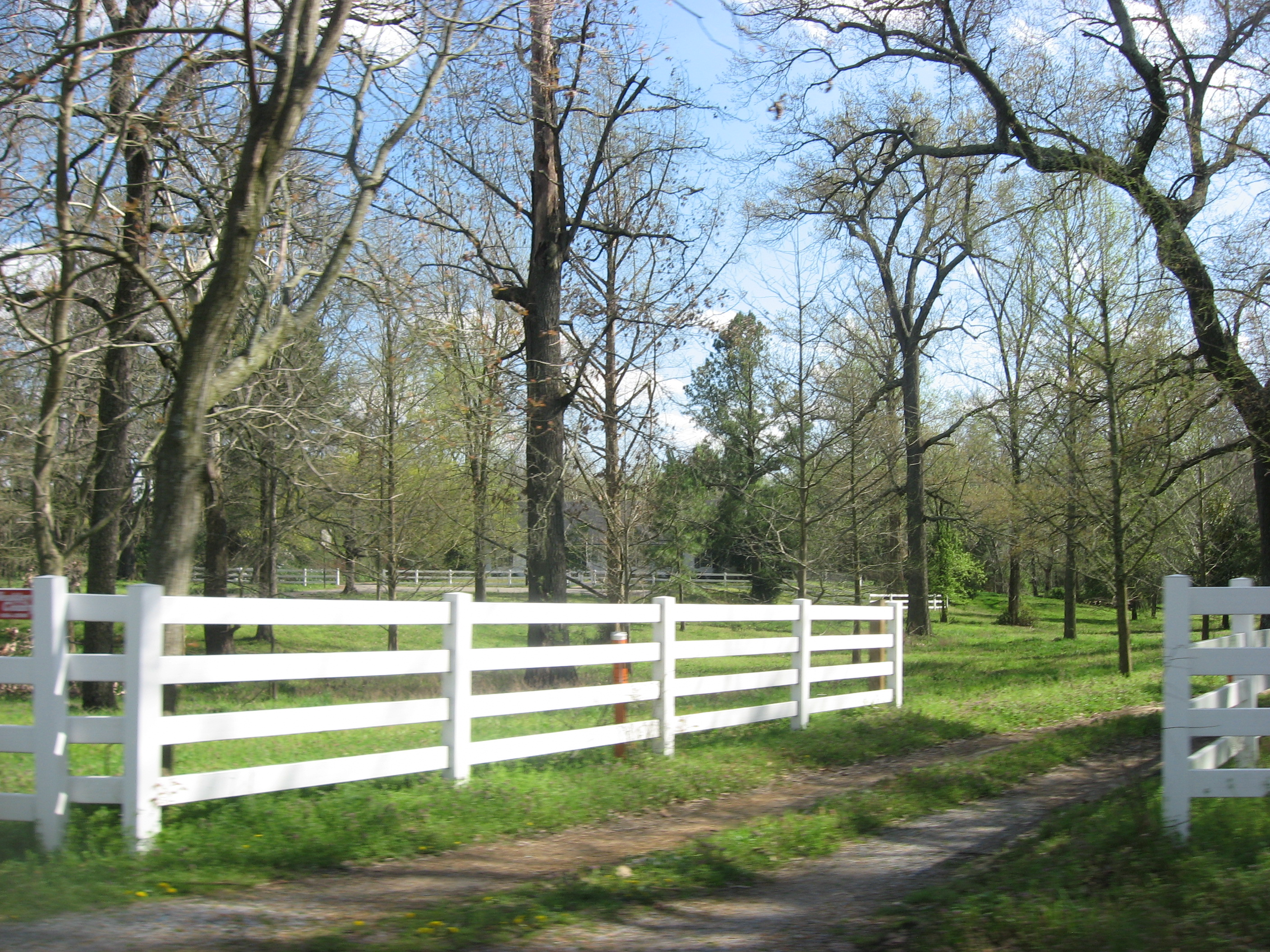
Farm gate in the Tennessee portion of the farm

The house was built in 1868 for Jesse Whitesell, in the style of an Italianate villa.

As of 2005, the house was still owned and occupied by members of the Whitesell family.
