= Mabel (disambiguation) =

Mabel is a feminine given name.

Mabel or Maybelle may also refer to:

== Places ==
=== United States ===
- Mabel, Florida, an unincorporated community
- Mabel, Kentucky, an unincorporated community
- Mabel, Minnesota, a small city
- Mabel, Missouri, an unincorporated community
- Mabel, Oregon, an unincorporated community

=== Elsewhere ===
- Cape Mabel, Laurie Island, Antarctica
- Mabel Island, Queensland, Australia
- Mabel Lake, British Columbia, Canada

== People ==
- Bessilyn Johnson (1872–1943), author used the pen name "Mabel"
- Mabel (singer) (born 1996), Spanish-born Swedish-English R&B and pop singer
- Mabel The Hick, a female wrestler from Gorgeous Ladies of Wrestling
- Mabel Johnson Leland (1871–1947), American lecturer, translator
- Mabel Matiz (born 1985), Turkish pop music singer-songwriter
- Maybelle Carter (1909–1978), American country musician
- Viscera (wrestler) (1971–2014), professional wrestler who used ring name "Mabel"

== Fictional characters ==
- Mabel Pines, a character from the television series Gravity Falls
- Mabel the Ugly Stepsister, a character from the Shrek film series
- Mama Maybelle Harper, a character in the American TV sitcom Gimme a Break!
- Mabel, a fictional dog in the Little Mabel children's series by British author Jilly Cooper
- Mabel Tanaka, a character from the film Hoppers

== Other uses ==
- "Mabel", episode of the television series Better Call Saul
- Mabel (band), Danish popular music group
- Mabel (dog), dog on Blue Peter
- Mabel (group), an Italo dance project
- MABEL (robot), a robot engineered in 2009 at the University of Michigan, United States

== See also ==
- Ladye Mabel, an 1891 steam yacht, later renamed White Ladye
- Mabel Downs, a cattle station in Western Australia
- Mable (disambiguation)
- Maple or Acer, a genus of trees
- Miss Mabel, a 1948 stage play by R. C. Sherriff
- "Mistress Mabel", a song by the Fratellis from the 2008 album Here We Stand
