= Order of United Commercial Travelers of America =

United Commercial Travellers or UCT is a non-profit organization that supports communities and causes across the United States and Canada. The organization is headquartered in Columbus, Ohio, and Grandview Heights.

== History ==
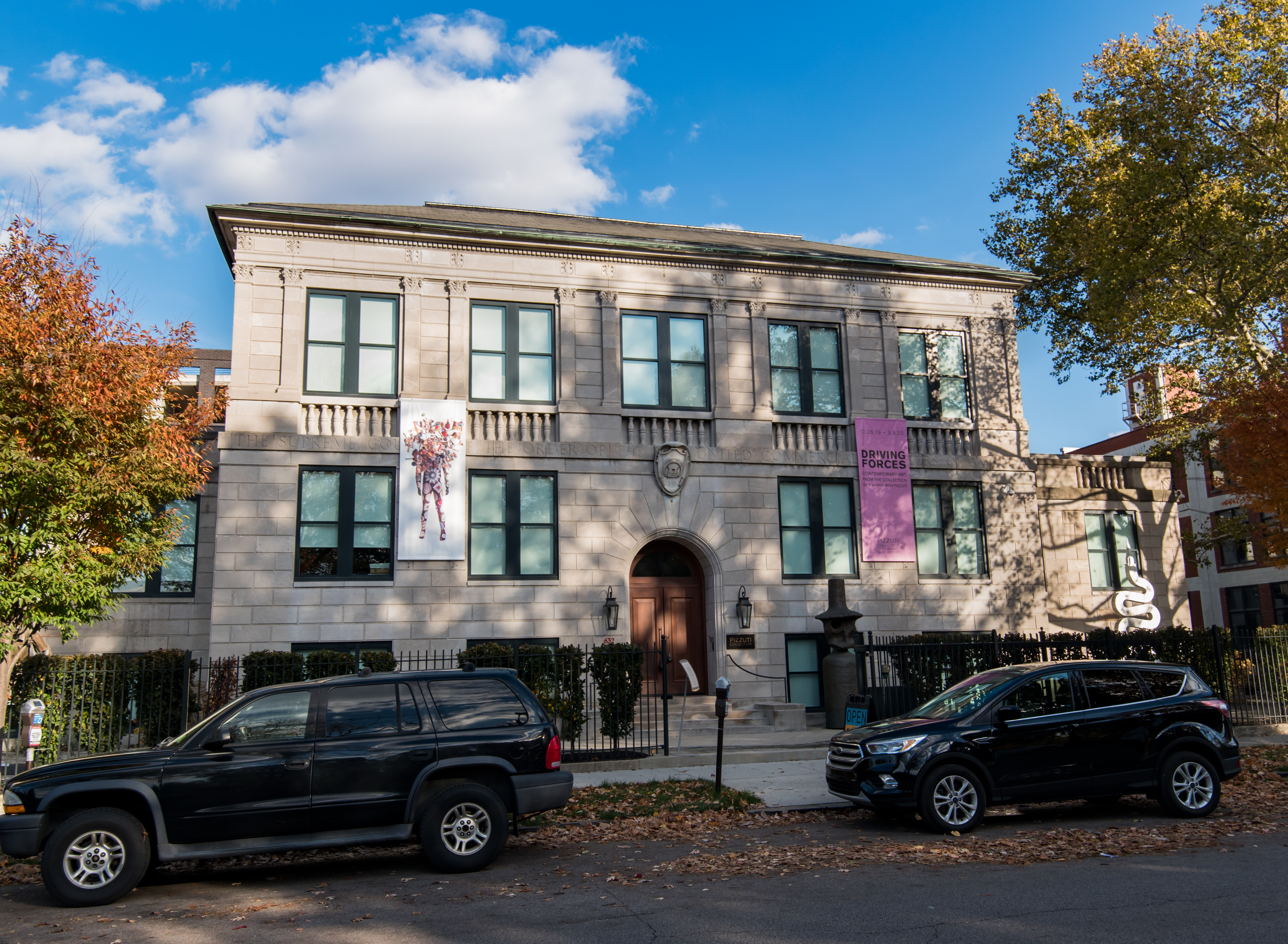
The Pizzuti Collection museum, formerly UCT headquarters from 1924 to 2008

The Order of United Commercial Travelers was formed on January 16, 1888, by six men in a meeting at the Neil House in Columbus, Ohio to provide a society for traveling salesmen, or commercial travelers.

The original objectives of the order were to aid its members and their dependents in financial and material matters, establish funds to indemnify members in case of disability or accidental death, establish a widows and orphans reserve fund and obtain just and equitable favors for traveling salesmen. The organization also wished to operate as a secret society, whose aim was to unite and raise the moral and social caliber of its members. In fact, it at one time referred to itself as "travelers masonry".

The new organization's officers adopted titles similar to those of other organizations of the day. Levi Pease was the first Supreme Counselor, John Fenimore was the first Supreme Junior Counselor, and Charles Flagg was the first Supreme Secretary.

The sample case, a vital tool in the life of a commercial traveler, became the symbol of UCT. The original emblem of the organization consisted of a gold crescent with a sample case suspended within the points of the crescent.

In 1956, the Order founded the UCT Fraternal Foundation which has yielded income to the Retarded Children Teachers Reserve Fund. Early in the Order history it paid out $25 a week to members disabled as the result of an accident and beginning in 1894 it paid out $5,000 in accidental death benefits.

=== The Sample Case Magazine ===
The Sample Case, the "acknowledged mouthpiece and official organ of UCT" as stated on page one, made its debut May 15, 1891. The first issues were published on the 1st and 15th of the month. The subscription price was $1 and single issues were 5 cents. Today, members receive a subscription to the quarterly magazine, which highlights community projects, volunteer opportunities, benefits and products, and local and regional council news.

=== Expansion to Canada ===
With the development of transcontinental rail in the late 1800s markets for many products expanded west and into Canada. Commercial travelers headed west and north to take advantage of these new markets.

As they did, they took with them information about UCT and its membership benefits. Winnipeg Council 154 became the first UCT Canadian council in 1899.

== Ritual ==
The order had a ritual that included an oath of secrecy, vows to aid other brothers and their dependents, obey the laws of their country and aid in caring for the sick, among other things. An older version included a vow to never violate the chastity of a maiden. The ritual included five lectures and was full of religious symbolism, with an altar and an open Bible.

== Membership ==
In 1979 the Order was open to any male citizens of the United States, Canada or another North American British possession, aged eighteen to fifty five, who was of good moral character and in good physical and mental condition. At one point it was open only to whites. In 1948 it opened its membership to professionals and businessmen. In 1969 it has 240,000 members in 680 local Councils. In 1979 it 226,221 members in 670 councils in forty six states, the District of Columbia and ten Canadian provinces.

Membership is open to both men and women age 18 and above who have an interest in good citizenship and volunteering to improve their local communities. Members of local councils have the ability to direct volunteer efforts based on the needs of the local community.

== Organization ==
Local units of the group are called "councils". Five Councils in a state or province can apply for a charter to form a "Grand Council". The first Grand Council was established in Ohio on May 26, 1889, and second was founded in Missouri in 1891. The highest authority is the "Supreme Council". Officers on the Grand and Supreme level are the same as those on the local level, except they add Grand or Supreme to their title respectively, ergo, a treasurer on the Grand level is a Grand Treasurer, on the Supreme level is a Supreme Treasurer, etc. There is also a side degree on the model of the Shriners called the Ancient Mystic Order of the Bagmen of Baghdad.

=== Local councils ===
Local councils are the foundation of UCT. Through volunteer service each local council works to support the needs of its community. Local council members plan and conduct meetings, organize events and enjoy social activities. Volunteers also serve as leaders. Councils nominate officers who are elected annually for a one-year term. They also nominate the executive committee, whose members are elected for two-year terms. Prospective members wishing to join UCT will be connected with a council closest to them.

=== Regional councils ===
Providing leadership and direction to local councils are 29 regional and state councils in the U.S. and Canada. Regional councils help with local council operations, provide direction and form new councils. Officers are elected at the regional level and serve one-year terms.

=== Senior management and home office staff ===
The board hires the CEO who is responsible for the operations of UCT's home office. The CEO and the rest of the Senior Management team oversee insurance operations and Fraternal operations in the home office in Columbus and the Canadian office in Calgary.

=== Insurance agents ===
Agents are members and active within local councils. They provide products based on the financial needs of individuals and families in their areas.

== See also ==
- Travelers Protective Association of America
- Fraternal Benefit Society
- List of North American fraternal benefit orders
- Victoria Travellers Football Club
