= Lynn Grove, Kentucky =

Unincorporated community in Kentucky, United States

Lynn Grove
- Unincorporated community
- Location within the state of Kentucky Lynn Grove (the United States)
- Coordinates: 36°35′21″N 88°26′17″W
- Country: United States
- State: Kentucky
- County: Calloway
- Elevation: 574 ft (175 m)
- Time zone: UTC-6 (Central (CST))
  - Summer (DST): UTC-5 (CST)
- ZIP codes: 42062
- GNIS feature ID: 497381

Lynn Grove is an unincorporated community in Calloway County, Kentucky, United States.

== History ==
Lilburn Linn establish a post office on the site in 1873 known as Linn Grove, Kentucky, but it closed in 1874. In 1886 another post office was opened by Leon Blythe and it was known as Leonville, Kentucky. On April 6, 1892, the name was changed to Lynn Grove. It is thought a clerical error at the U.S. Post Office is why the spelling is different from the original name.The town is located at the junction of Kentucky Route 94 and Kentucky Route 893.
