= Bondurant, Kentucky =

Unincorporated community in Kentucky, United States

- Unincorporated community
- Location within the state of Kentucky Bondurant (the United States)
- Coordinates: 36°31′24″N 89°19′11″W
- Country: United States
- State: Kentucky
- County: Fulton
- Elevation: 285 ft (87 m)
- Time zone: UTC-6 (Central (CST))
  - Summer (DST): UTC-5 (CST)
- GNIS feature ID: 507548

Bondurant is an unincorporated community in western Fulton County, Kentucky, United States. It is named after an early settler, a descendant of a large party of French Huguenots who landed in Virginia in 1700 and settled above the falls of the James River.
