= Kentucky Route 95 =

State highway in Kentucky, United States

Kentucky Route 95

Route information
- Maintained by KYTC
- Length: 7.532 mi (12.122 km)

Major junctions
- South end: US 68 near Calvert City
- US 62 in Calvert City
- North end: Haddox Ferry Road in Calvert City

Location
- Country: United States
- State: Kentucky
- Counties: Marshall

Highway system
- Kentucky State Highway System; Interstate; US; State; Parkways
← KY 94	→ KY 96

Kentucky Route 95 (KY 95) is a 7.532-mile (12.122 km) state highway in Marshall County, Kentucky. It runs from U.S. Route 68 south of Calvert City to Haddox Ferry Road in northern Calvert City via Calvert City.

== Route description ==
The highway runs from a junction with US 68 just northwest of Draffenville, and crosses Interstate 24 via an overpass before intersection US Route 62. At Calvert City, KY 95 intersects KY 282 and KY 1523. It terminates just north of the KY 1523 junction.

== History ==
KY 95 was originally designated from the Tennessee state line at Hazel, Kentucky, through the Calloway County seat of Murray, through Benton and Draffenville, along with its current routing. KY 95 also previously traversed the Tennessee River into Livingston County via a Free Ferry to meet an intersection with the original routing of US 62 (in that area, it is now KY 453). KY 95 from the Tennessee state line to Draffenville was eventually replaced by U.S. Route 641 during the 1950s, thus shortening KY 95 dramatically. As for the ferry on the Tennessee River, service was discontinued in the mid-1960s.

== Major intersections ==
The entire route is in Marshall County.

Location	mi	km	Destinations	Notes
	0.000	0.000	US 68	Southern terminus
	0.753	1.212	KY 1422 (Palma Road)	
	1.282	2.063	KY 2595 east (Lakeview Church Road)	Western terminus of KY 2595
	3.394	5.462	Doppel Lane (KY 6048 west)	Eastern terminus of KY 6048
Calvert City	4.079	6.565	US 62	
Calvert City	6.700	10.783	KY 282 east (Johnson Riley Road) / North Alabama Street	Western terminus of KY 282
Calvert City	7.282	11.719	KY 1523 (Industrial Parkway)	
Calvert City	7.532	12.122	Haddox Ferry Road	Northern terminus; end of state maintenance
1.000 mi = 1.609 km; 1.000 km = 0.621 mi
