= Brownsville, Fulton County, Kentucky =

Unincorporated community in Kentucky, United States

Brownsville, Kentucky
- Unincorporated community
- Location within the state of Kentucky Brownsville (the United States)
- Coordinates: 36°32′5″N 89°13′1″W
- Country: United States
- State: Kentucky
- County: Fulton
- Elevation: 459 ft (140 m)
- Time zone: UTC-6 (Central (CST))
  - Summer (DST): UTC-5 (CST)
- GNIS feature ID: 507597

Brownsville is an unincorporated community in Fulton County, Kentucky, United States.
