= First Christian Church (Clinton, Kentucky) =

- U.S. National Register of Historic Places
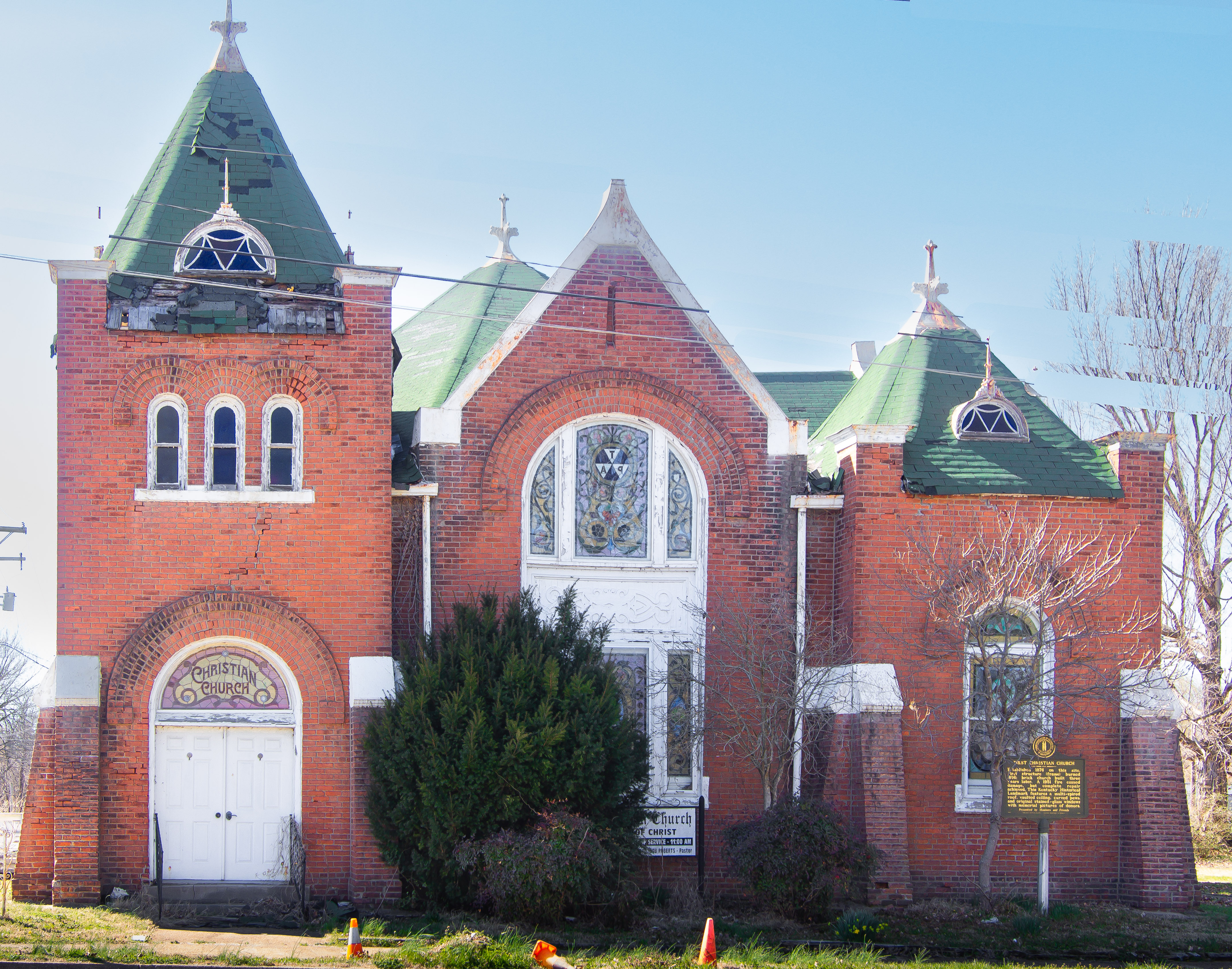

- Location within Kentucky
- Location: 201 N. Washington St., Clinton, Kentucky
- Coordinates: 36.66822°N 88.99387°W
- Area: .25 acres (0.10 ha)
- Built: 1899
- Architectural style: Romanesque Revival
- NRHP reference No.: 16000005
- Added to NRHP: February 11, 2016

The First Christian Church in Clinton, Kentucky, at 201 N. Washington St., was established at that site in 1876. Its original building was destroyed in a fire in 1896, and the current building was built in 1899. The current building was listed on the National Register of Historic Places in 2016.

It is Romanesque Revival in style; its architect is unknown. It has several stained glass windows on its principal facades facing east and south; the central bay on each of those facades features a two-story tripartite stained glass window. The church was expanded to the northeast to add a fellowship hall including a full kitchen in 1966.

It was deemed significant primarily for its Romanesque Revival architecture, as the only example of that relatively sophisticated style in Hickman County: "For a church group intent on announcing the solidity, wealth, and social prestige of their congregation, the Romanesque Revival design provided those messages."

Art historian Daniel Keith Patterson, who visited the church and was given a guided tour, noted in 2015 its "impressive and unique exposed wood beam vaulted ceiling", which he compared to that of the central, octagonal tower of the medieval, cruciform cathedral at Ely, Cambridgeshire, England. He also noted that the stained glass includes portrayal of patrons of the church, as do many medieval and Renaissance era works, in this case a J.W. Higbee and a J.M. Samuels. These persons were associated with the Travelers Protective Association of America, a fraternal organization, in two of the three primary stained glass groupings; the letters T P A appear, repeatedly, in the third.

The building was still a church in 2015; it then passed into private ownership and was available for use as a wedding venue.
