= Kentucky Route 123 =

State highway in Kentucky, United States

Kentucky Route 123
- KY 123 highlighted in red

Route information
- Maintained by KYTC
- Length: 33.031 mi (53.158 km)

Major junctions
- South end: KY 307 / KY 3061 in rural Hickman County
- US 51 / KY 58 in Clinton; KY 58 / KY 80 in Columbus
- North end: US 51 in Bardwell

Location
- Country: United States
- State: Kentucky
- Counties: Hickman

Highway system
- Kentucky State Highway System; Interstate; US; State; Parkways
← KY 122	→ KY 124

Kentucky Route 123 (KY 123) is a state highway in Kentucky. It runs from KY 307/KY 3061 in rural Hickman County east of Clinton to U.S. Route 51 (US 51) in Bardwell via Clinton and Columbus.

== Major intersections ==
County	Location	mi	km	Destinations	Notes
Hickman		0.000	0.000	KY 307 / KY 3061 south	Southern terminus; continues as KY 3061
Hickman		1.538	2.475	KY 575 south	Northern terminus of KY 575
Hickman		3.748	6.032	KY 1708 east	Western terminus of KY 1708
Hickman	Clinton	7.500	12.070	KY 1745 west (North College Street) / South College Street	Eastern terminus of KY 1745
Hickman	Clinton	7.775	12.513	KY 1731 (Waterfield Drive)	
Hickman	Clinton	7.853	12.638	US 51 east / KY 58 (Washington Street)	Southern end of KY 58 concurrency
Hickman	Clinton	8.506	13.689	KY 58 west	Northern end of KY 58 concurrency
Hickman		9.516	15.315	KY 1037 east	Western terminus of KY 1037
Hickman		10.704	17.226	KY 239 south / Great River Road south	Northern terminus of KY 239; southern end of Great River Road concurrency
Hickman		13.457	21.657	KY 1826 east	Western terminus of KY 1826
Hickman		18.351	29.533	KY 808 north	Southern terminus of KY 808
Hickman		19.261	30.998	KY 1300 north	Southern terminus of KY 1300
Hickman		20.219	32.539	KY 808 south	Northern terminus of KY 808
Hickman	Columbus	22.443	36.119	KY 58 east	Southern end of KY 58 concurrency
Hickman	Columbus	22.631	36.421	KY 58 west / KY 80 east	Northern end of KY 58 concurrency; western terminus of KY 80; southern end of KY 80 concurrency
Hickman	Columbus	22.781	36.662	KY 3058 south (West Hoover Parkway) / Black Road	Northern terminus of KY 3058
Hickman	Columbus	22.811	36.711	KY 1757 south	Northern terminus of KY 1757
Hickman		24.157	38.877	KY 80 east	Northern end of KY 80 concurrency
Carlisle		26.202	42.168	KY 877 east	Western terminus of KY 877
Carlisle		29.67	47.75	KY 1203 north (Beech Grove Road) / Great River Road north	Southern terminus of KY 1203; northern end of Great River Road concurrency
Carlisle		31.362	50.472	KY 1741 west	Eastern terminus of KY 1741
Carlisle	Bardwell	32.718	52.655	KY 1591 south / Jefferson Street	Northern terminus of KY 1591
Carlisle	Bardwell	33.031	53.158	US 51 (Elm Street)	Northern terminus
1.000 mi = 1.609 km; 1.000 km = 0.621 mi: Concurrency terminus
