= Clinton College (Kentucky) =

Clinton College was a Baptist college in Clinton, Kentucky established in 1873 and opening in 1874, until its closure in 1915. Originally a girls' school called Clinton Female College, it became coeducational in 1876. The campus covered eight acres. The school's founder was Willis White, a Baptist preacher who had served as superintendent of schools of Hickman County. The school operated under the auspices of, first, the West Union Baptist Association, and, later, the West Kentucky Baptist Association. Students came "mainly from western Kentucky, northwestern Tennessee, and southeastern Missouri and could receive instruction from "primary to collegiate" levels." After its closure, the campus was used for Clinton High School from 1918 until 1935. In 1949, the campus was used by the West Kentucky Baptist Institution.

== Notable people ==
- Jean Gurney Fine Spahr (1861–1935), teacher, social reformer

== See also ==
- Marvin College Boys Dormitory and President's House: Also in Clinton, Kentucky
- List of Baptist colleges and universities in the United States
- List of colleges and universities in Kentucky
