= Miller, Fulton County, Kentucky =

Unincorporated community in Kentucky, United States

Miller, Kentucky
- Unincorporated community
- Location within the state of Kentucky Miller (the United States)
- Coordinates: 36°31′6″N 89°20′19″W
- Country: United States
- State: Kentucky
- County: Fulton
- Elevation: 285 ft (87 m)
- Time zone: UTC-6 (Central (CST))
  - Summer (DST): UTC-5 (CST)
- GNIS feature ID: 508605

Miller is an unincorporated community in Fulton County, Kentucky, United States.
