= Tyler, Kentucky =

Unincorporated community in Kentucky, United States

- Unincorporated community
- Location within the state of Kentucky Tyler (the United States)
- Coordinates: 36°30′27″N 89°21′5″W
- Country: United States
- State: Kentucky
- County: Fulton
- Elevation: 289 ft (88 m)
- Time zone: UTC-6 (Central (CST))
  - Summer (DST): UTC-5 (CST)
- GNIS feature ID: 509256

Tyler is an unincorporated community in Fulton County, Kentucky, United States.
