= Columbus, Kentucky =

- City
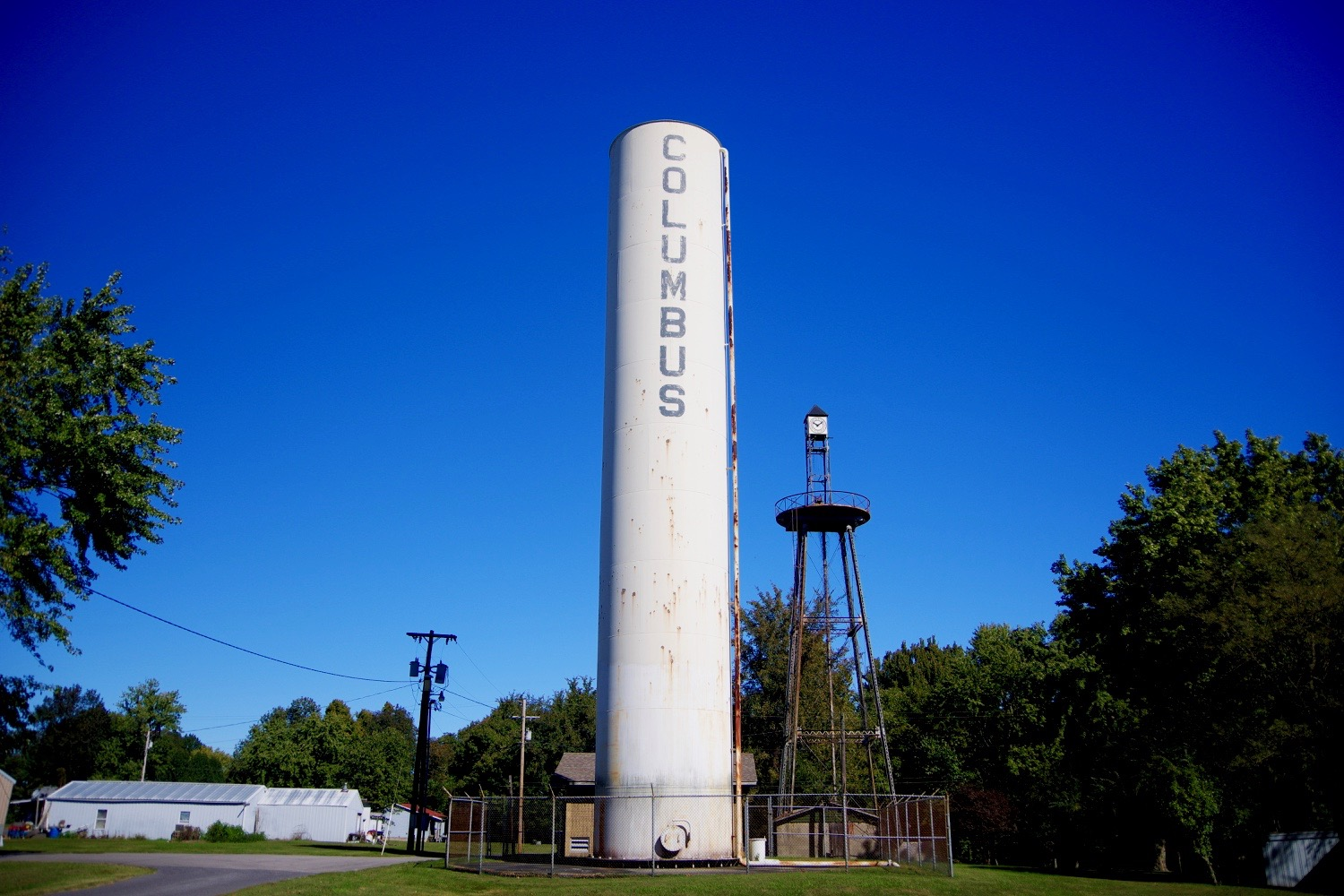
- Water tower in Columbus

- Location of Columbus in Hickman County, Kentucky.
- Coordinates: 36°45′37″N 89°6′10″W
- Country: United States
- State: Kentucky
- County: Hickman

Area
  - Total: 0.32 sq mi (0.83 km^{2})
  - Land: 0.32 sq mi (0.82 km^{2})
  - Water: 0 sq mi (0.00 km^{2})
- Elevation: 460 ft (140 m)

Population (2020)
  - Total: 140
  - Density: 439.9/sq mi (169.85/km^{2})
- Time zone: UTC-6 (Central (CST))
  - Summer (DST): UTC-5 (CDT)
- ZIP code: 42032
- Area codes: 270 & 364
- FIPS code: 21-16768
- GNIS feature ID: 0489887

Columbus is a home rule-class city in Hickman County, Kentucky, in the United States. The population was 140 at the 2020 census, a decline from 229 in 2000. The city lies at the western end of the state, less than a mile from the Mississippi River.

Columbus-Belmont State Park borders the city to the west.

== History ==
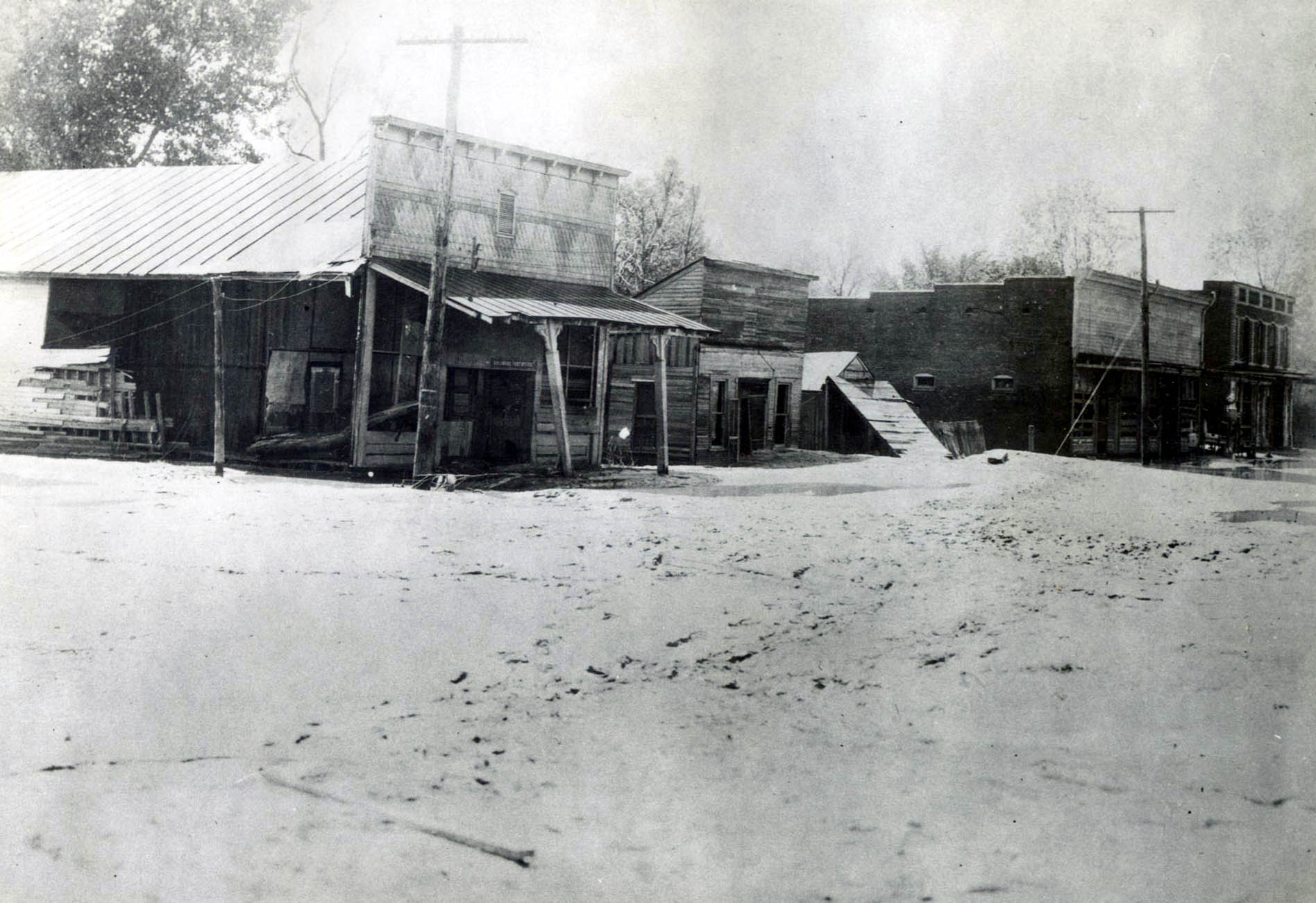
Downtown Columbus, c. 1920

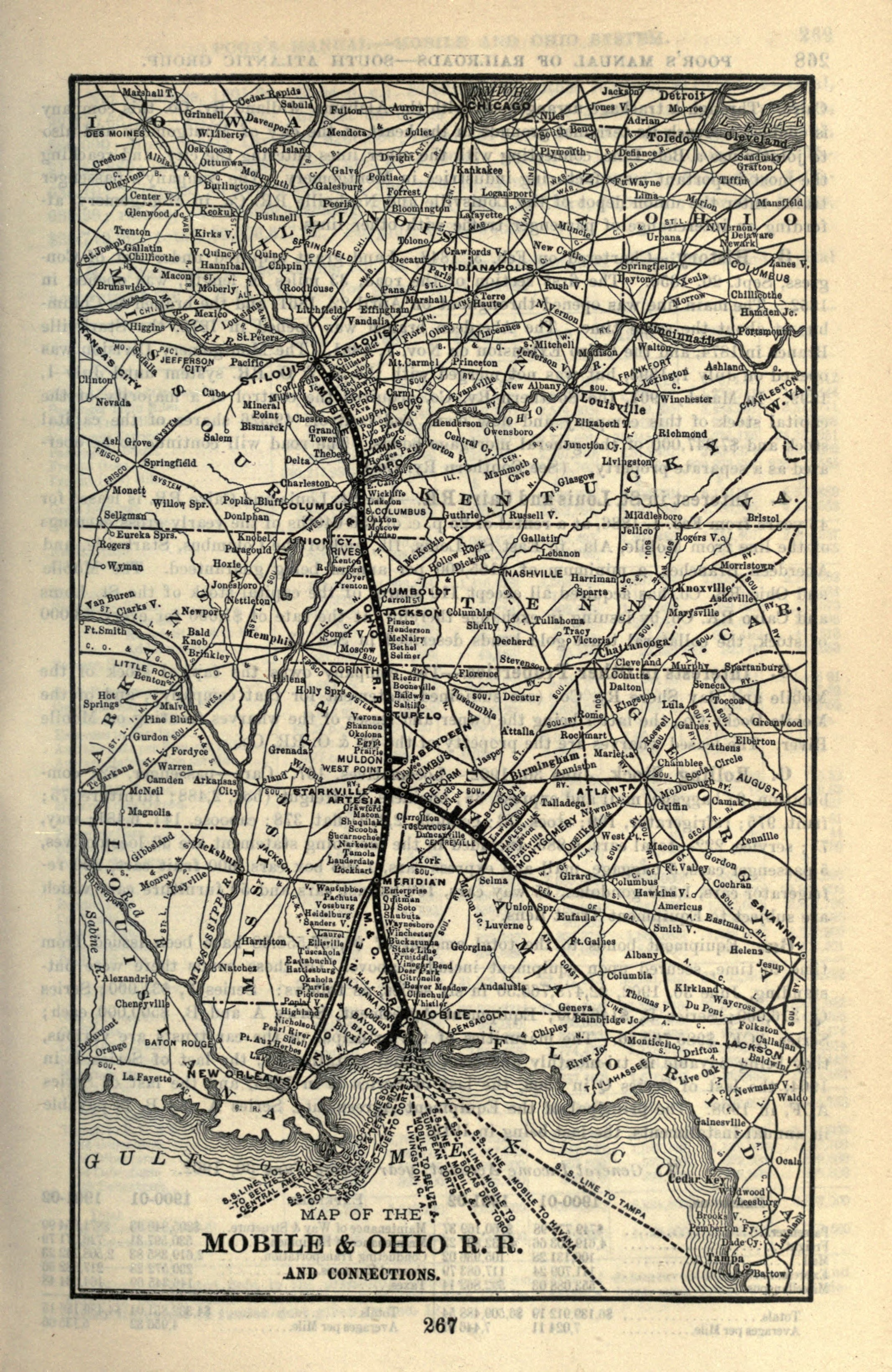
A system map of the M&O in 1903, by which time it had expanded north to St. Louis

Columbus is the oldest town in Kentucky's Jackson Purchase. It was first settled on the Mississippi floodplain in 1804 and known as "Iron Banks" after the site's French name les rivages de fer. The long-held local rumor that President Thomas Jefferson planned to remove the American capital to the site has absolutely no basis in fact.

The name of the town was changed to Columbus in 1820 (in honor of the Italian explorer), the year the town received its first post office and was formally established by the state assembly. It was the original Hickman County seat before the transfer of the court to the more central location of Clinton. It was formally incorporated in 1860.

In 1861, after the American Civil War broke out, the town was seized by Confederate forces (including the Louisiana "Shreveport Rebels". They fortified the site overlooking the Mississippi River, building Fort de Russey.) Confederate general Leonidas Polk tried to run and maintain a large anchor chain across the entire Mississippi at Columbus in order to block Union traffic downriver. Columbus was also the northernmost spur on the Mobile and Ohio Railroad. The Union responded by General Ulysses S. Grant's engaging the Confederates at Belmont on the Missouri shore. This was Grant's first direct combat during the war. These actions are today commemorated at the Columbus-Belmont State Park on the bluff near Columbus.

In 1878, the American railroad legend Casey Jones got his first railroad job here, working as a telegrapher for the Mobile and Ohio at the age of 15.

The Great Mississippi Flood of 1927 deluged the town, as well as many areas downriver in the Mississippi Delta, where hundreds of thousands of acres were flooded. Survivors moved the town of Columbus, rebuilding it upon higher ground above the flood plain. Some of the original houses were saved and moved inland.

In April 2026, The Ingram Distillery opened to the public for tours of their unique floating barrelhouses for aging bourbon.

Given its isolated location in a rural area and the decline in river traffic, the town has lost population for years.

== Geography ==
Columbus is located in northwestern Hickman County at 36°45′37″N 89°6′10″W (36.760176, -89.102840), on high ground 0.6 miles (0.97 km) east of the Mississippi River. It is bordered to the west by Columbus-Belmont State Park, which occupies a bluff rising nearly 200 feet (61 m) above the river.

Kentucky Route 58 leads southeast from Columbus 9 miles (14 km) to Clinton, the county seat. Kentucky Route 123 passes through the center of town, leading south then east 15 miles (24 km) to Clinton and north-northeast 10 miles (16 km) to Bardwell. Via Kentucky Route 80 it is 6 miles (10 km) east-northeast to Arlington.

According to the United States Census Bureau, the city has a total area of 0.3 square miles (0.8 km^{2}), all land.

== Demographics ==
Historical population
Census	Pop.	Note	%±
1830	196		—
1860	963		—
1870	1,574		63.4%
1880	1,338		−15.0%
1890	873		−34.8%
1900	1,235		41.5%
1910	970		−21.5%
1920	654		−32.6%
1930	513		−21.6%
1940	552		7.6%
1950	482		−12.7%
1960	357		−25.9%
1970	371		3.9%
1980	296		−20.2%
1990	252		−14.9%
2000	229		−9.1%
2010	170		−25.8%
2020	140		−17.6%
U.S. Decennial Census

As of the census of 2000, there were 229 people, 95 households, and 60 families residing in the city. The population density was 558.6 inhabitants per square mile (215.7/km^{2}). There were 110 housing units at an average density of 268.3 per square mile (103.6/km^{2}). The racial makeup of the city was 77.29% White, 17.90% Black or African American, 2.18% from other races, and 2.62% from two or more races. Hispanic or Latino of any race were 4.80% of the population.

There were 95 households, out of which 27.4% had children under the age of 18 living with them, 49.5% were married couples living together, 12.6% had a female householder with no husband present, and 35.8% were non-families. 31.6% of all households were made up of individuals, and 12.6% had someone living alone who was 65 years of age or older. The average household size was 2.41 and the average family size was 3.11.

In the city, the population was spread out, with 23.1% under the age of 18, 13.5% from 18 to 24, 26.2% from 25 to 44, 24.0% from 45 to 64, and 13.1% who were 65 years of age or older. The median age was 35 years. For every 100 females, there were 102.7 males. For every 100 females age 18 and over, there were 95.6 males.

The median income for a household in the city was $25,313, and the median income for a family was $29,844. Males had a median income of $21,667 versus $14,500 for females. The per capita income for the city was $11,766. About 5.1% of families and 9.1% of the population were below the poverty line, including 13.5% of those under the age of eighteen and 8.3% of those 65 or over.

== Climate ==
The climate in this area is characterized by hot, humid summers and generally mild to cool winters. According to the Köppen Climate Classification system, Columbus has a humid subtropical climate, abbreviated "Cfa" on climate maps.

== Notable people ==
- Edmund H. Taylor Jr., distiller and politician
