= Mable (business) =

Mobile App Business Launchpad Experiment, often stylized as Mable, is a business accelerator based in Portland, Oregon, U.S., that provides mentorship and resources to select startup companies. The program was informally launched in 2015 before converting to a formal structure in 2016. Mable participants are chosen by a selection committee following an application process. Participants will either then be sent to prepare for an investor pitch and receive limited coaching or be sent to enroll in the app academy accelerator where they spend three months developing their businesses with support from mentors and coaches. Companies that pass through the accelerator may also be provided a seed round of financial assistance.

The program's inaugural class will support four businesses primarily focused on mobile technology, most of which were Portland-based. Mable's 2015 class includes a wider variety of business models. Following graduation, startups are provided with an opportunity to pitch their business plans at the investor pitch events.

== Program structure ==
Participants receive $20,000–50,000 in seed money in exchange for six percent stakes and spend three months developing their businesses with assistance from "mentors, big brands and other startups".

The program is similar to the Portland Incubator Experiment and the Portland Seed Fund, a public-private program (funded in part by the cities of Hillsboro, Portland, and the Oregon Lottery). that encourages entrepreneurship and invests in startups.

== See also ==
- Angel investor
- Venture capital financing
