= Pryorsburg, Kentucky =

Census-designated place in Kentucky, United States

- Census-designated place
- Location within Kentucky Location within the United States
- Coordinates: 36°41′20″N 88°42′53″W
- Country: United States
- State: Kentucky
- County: Graves

Area
  - Total: 1.26 sq mi (3.27 km^{2})
  - Land: 1.25 sq mi (3.23 km^{2})
  - Water: 0.019 sq mi (0.05 km^{2})
- Elevation: 417 ft (127 m)

Population (2020)
  - Total: 262
  - Density: 210.4/sq mi (81.22/km^{2})
- Time zone: UTC-6 (Central (CST))
  - Summer (DST): UTC-5 (CDT)
- ZIP Code: 42066
- Area codes: 270 & 364
- GNIS feature ID: 2629668

Pryorsburg (also Pryors) is an unincorporated community and census-designated place (CDP) in Graves County, Kentucky, United States. As of the 2020 census, Pryorsburg had a population of 262.

The community is located along U.S. Route 45, 6 miles (10 km) southwest of Mayfield, the county seat.

== Demographics ==
Historical population
Census	Pop.	Note	%±
2020	262		—
U.S. Decennial Census
