= Pond Branch =

Stream in the American state of Missouri

Coordinates: 37.3922761°N 90.1564995°W

Pond Branch is a stream in Madison County in the U.S. state of Missouri. It is a tributary of the Castor River.

Pond Branch was named for the fact its headwaters were fed from a pond.

== See also ==
- List of rivers of Missouri
