= Fulton County, Kentucky =

County in Kentucky, United States

- County
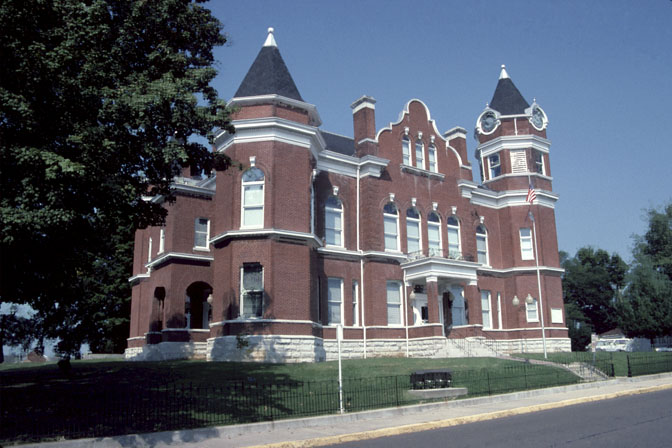
- Fulton County Courthouse in Hickman

- Location within the U.S. state of Kentucky
- Coordinates: 36°33′N 89°11′W
- Country: United States
- State: Kentucky
- Founded: 1845
- Named for: Robert Fulton
- Seat: Hickman
- Largest city: Hickman

Government
  - Judge/Executive: Jim Martin (D)

Area
  - Total: 231 sq mi (600 km^{2})
  - Land: 206 sq mi (530 km^{2})
  - Water: 25 sq mi (65 km^{2}) 11%

Population (2020)
  - Total: 6,515
  - Estimate (2025): 6,218 ▼
  - Density: 31.6/sq mi (12.2/km^{2})
- Time zone: UTC−6 (Central)
  - Summer (DST): UTC−5 (CDT)
- Congressional district: 1st
- Website: fultoncounty.ky.gov/Pages/index.aspx

Fulton County is the westernmost county in the U.S. state of Kentucky, with the Mississippi River forming its western boundary. As of the 2020 census, the population was 6,515. Its county seat and largest city is Hickman. The county was formed in 1845 from Hickman County, Kentucky and named for Robert Fulton, the inventor of the steamboat.

Allied with Tennessee by trade and culture, white Fulton County residents were largely pro-Confederate during the American Civil War. Forces from both armies passed through the county during different periods of the conflict. Because of imprecise early surveying of Kentucky's southern border, Fulton County is divided into two non-contiguous parts. An exclave on the peninsula in the Kentucky Bend of the Mississippi River can be reached only by road through Tennessee.

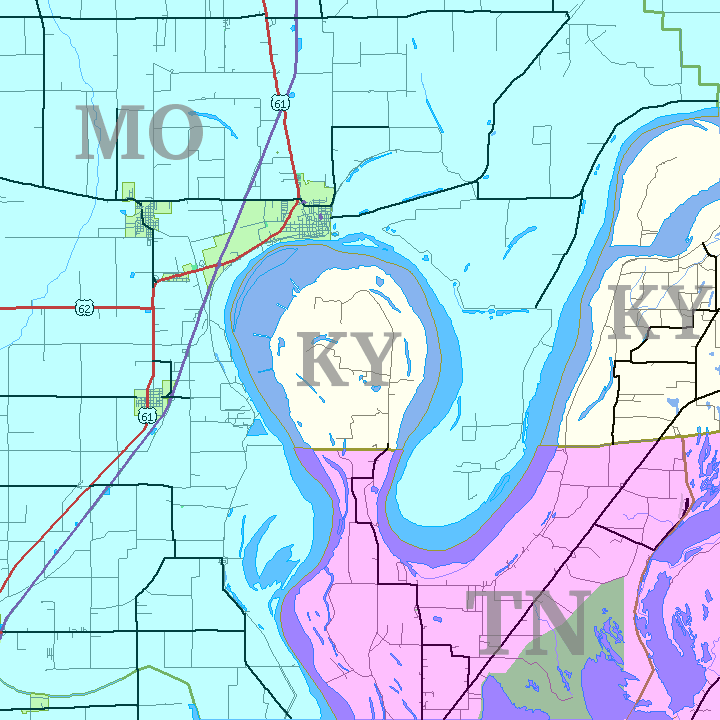
Kentucky Bend and surrounding area Missouri (MO) Tennessee (TN) Kentucky (KY)

== History ==
The rural county was not organized until 1845, from a portion of Hickman County. It was named for Robert Fulton, inventor of the steamboat. Hickman, Kentucky was designated as the county seat. The county was developed for agriculture, which was originally dependent on slave labor. Area farmers had ties to Tennessee planters, and shipped produce down the Mississippi River, which formed the county's western border. They supported the Confederacy, while Kentucky maintained official neutrality as a Border State.

During the post-Reconstruction period, there was considerable racial violence by whites against blacks in Fulton County; they exercised terrorism to re-establish and maintain white supremacy. Whites lynched 20 African Americans here from 1877 to 1950; most were killed around the turn of the 20th century. This was by far the highest total of any county in the state, more than 10 times the total in many other counties. Five men were lynched from 1883 to 1917, for alleged rape, assault, barn burning, and robbery and murder.

After the Civil War, some African Americans became landowners in the county. A notably egregious lynching was that on October 3, 1908, in Hickman of David Walker and his entire family by 50 Night Riders. This may have been part of anarchic violence that was directed at blacks arising from the "Reelfoot Lake Uprising", but it also appeared that whites coveted Walker's land. Walker and his wife, an infant in arms, and three children were shot multiple times; the eldest son burned to death in their farmhouse; seven in total were killed on the night of October 3, 1908, in Hickman. Walker owned a 21 1/2 acre farm; his white neighbor took it over after the killings, and later sold it to another white man. One of the latter's descendants continues to own the rural land.

On December 16, 1918, Private Charles Lewis, a veteran of World War I, was lynched at Tyler Station. Private Lewis was accused of robbery and while he was held in the local jail, a group of masked men forced their way into the jail, smashed the locks with a sledgehammer, then took him outside and hanged him from a tree.

== Geography ==
According to the U.S. Census Bureau, the county has a total area of 231 square miles (600 km^{2}), of which 206 square miles (530 km^{2}) is land and 25 square miles (65 km^{2}) (11%) is water.

About 11 square miles (28 km^{2}) of the county is separated in a peninsula from the rest of the state by an oxbow of the Mississippi River, known as the Kentucky Bend or New Madrid Bend, after the city in Missouri on the north side of the river. Travelers going there have to pass into Tennessee by road (there is no bridge from Missouri) and then go north to reach the Kentucky Bend exclave. The lowest point in the state of Kentucky is located on the Mississippi River in Kentucky Bend in Fulton County, where it flows past Kentucky and between Tennessee and Missouri. It is expected that over time, the river will cut across the short neck of the peninsula, cutting it off entirely from Kentucky, with land gradually filling in behind it to connect it to Missouri.

=== Adjacent counties ===
- Mississippi County, Missouri (northwest)
- Hickman County (northeast)
- Obion County, Tennessee (south)
- Lake County, Tennessee (southwest)
- New Madrid County, Missouri (west)

=== National protected area ===
- Reelfoot National Wildlife Refuge (part)

=== Major highways ===
- US 45
- US 51
- KY 58
- KY 94
- KY 116
- KY 123
- KY 125
- KY 166
- KY 239
- KY 307
- KY 781
- KY 924
- KY 1529

== Demographics ==
Historical population
Census	Pop.	Note	%±
1850	4,446		—
1860	5,317		19.6%
1870	6,161		15.9%
1880	7,977		29.5%
1890	10,005		25.4%
1900	11,546		15.4%
1910	14,114		22.2%
1920	15,197		7.7%
1930	14,927		−1.8%
1940	15,413		3.3%
1950	13,668		−11.3%
1960	11,256		−17.6%
1970	10,183		−9.5%
1980	8,971		−11.9%
1990	8,271		−7.8%
2000	7,752		−6.3%
2010	6,813		−12.1%
2020	6,515		−4.4%
2025 (est.)	6,218	▼	−4.6%
U.S. Decennial Census; 1790-1960 1900-1990; 1990-2000 2010-2021

=== 2020 census ===
Fulton County racial composition (2020)
Race	Percent
White	70.6%
Black or African American	22.2%
American Indian and Alaska Native	0.4%
Asian	0.3%
Native Hawaiian and Pacific Islander	0.2%
Some other race	1.0%
Two or more races	5.3%
Hispanic or Latino (of any race)	2.3%

As of the 2020 United States census, the county had a population of 6,515. The median age was 43.0 years. 20.4% of residents were under the age of 18 and 21.3% of residents were 65 years of age or older. For every 100 females there were 98.7 males, and for every 100 females age 18 and over there were 97.1 males age 18 and over.

35.8% of residents lived in urban areas, while 64.2% lived in rural areas.

There were 2,725 households in the county, of which 26.3% had children under the age of 18 living with them and 37.1% had a female householder with no spouse or partner present. About 36.0% of all households were made up of individuals and 16.0% had someone living alone who was 65 years of age or older.

There were 3,177 housing units, of which 14.2% were vacant. Among occupied housing units, 59.4% were owner-occupied and 40.6% were renter-occupied. The homeowner vacancy rate was 2.0% and the rental vacancy rate was 8.6%.

=== 2000 census ===
As of the census of 2000, there were 7,752 people, 3,237 households, and 2,113 families residing in the county. The population density was 37 per square mile (14/km^{2}). There were 3,697 housing units at an average density of 18 per square mile (6.9/km^{2}). The racial makeup of the county was 75.12% White, 23.19% Black or African American, 0.12% Native American, 0.31% Asian, 0.32% from other races, and 0.94% from two or more races. 0.72% of the population were Hispanic or Latino of any race.

There were 3,237 households, out of which 29.30% had children under the age of 18 living with them, 44.40% were married couples living together, 18.00% had a female householder with no husband present, and 34.70% were non-families. 32.30% of all households were made up of individuals, and 16.20% had someone living alone who was 65 years of age or older. The average household size was 2.32 and the average family size was 2.92.

In the county, the population was spread out, with 24.90% under the age of 18, 8.90% from 18 to 24, 25.50% from 25 to 44, 23.20% from 45 to 64, and 17.50% who were 65 years of age or older. The median age was 38 years. For every 100 females, there were 87.70 males. For every 100 females age 18 and over, there were 82.00 males.

The median income for a household in the county was $24,382, and the median income for a family was $30,788. Males had a median income of $26,401 versus $19,549 for females. The per capita income for the county was $14,309. About 20.10% of families and 23.10% of the population were below the poverty line, including 32.30% of those under age 18 and 16.00% of those age 65 or over.

== Politics ==
United States presidential election results for Fulton County, Kentucky
Year	Republican		Democratic		Third party(ies)	
Year	No.	%	No.	%	No.	%
1912	520	22.82%	1,609	70.60%	150	6.58%
1916	747	24.97%	2,200	73.53%	45	1.50%
1920	1,365	26.05%	3,843	73.35%	31	0.59%
1924	902	20.96%	3,336	77.53%	65	1.51%
1928	1,366	30.34%	3,132	69.55%	5	0.11%
1932	837	17.28%	3,985	82.25%	23	0.47%
1936	782	17.28%	3,727	82.35%	17	0.38%
1940	791	18.01%	3,592	81.79%	9	0.20%
1944	654	17.97%	2,973	81.68%	13	0.36%
1948	450	13.75%	2,497	76.29%	326	9.96%
1952	1,266	32.12%	2,673	67.81%	3	0.08%
1956	1,147	27.79%	2,953	71.54%	28	0.68%
1960	1,567	36.65%	2,708	63.35%	0	0.00%
1964	1,169	31.84%	2,493	67.89%	10	0.27%
1968	1,079	28.26%	1,204	31.53%	1,535	40.20%
1972	1,807	61.32%	1,024	34.75%	116	3.94%
1976	1,060	30.55%	2,370	68.30%	40	1.15%
1980	1,462	41.22%	2,016	56.84%	69	1.95%
1984	1,780	53.45%	1,534	46.07%	16	0.48%
1988	1,474	48.87%	1,531	50.76%	11	0.36%
1992	1,073	33.49%	1,813	56.59%	318	9.93%
1996	863	31.85%	1,614	59.56%	233	8.60%
2000	1,293	46.38%	1,452	52.08%	43	1.54%
2004	1,527	52.84%	1,340	46.37%	23	0.80%
2008	1,530	54.16%	1,238	43.82%	57	2.02%
2012	1,425	57.44%	1,022	41.19%	34	1.37%
2016	1,549	65.03%	774	32.49%	59	2.48%
2020	1,606	66.20%	794	32.73%	26	1.07%
2024	1,491	69.51%	636	29.65%	18	0.84%

Fulton County was a Democratic stronghold for most of its history and was one of the few Kentucky counties carried by Al Gore in 2000. Since then, however, it has swung sharply towards the Republican Party.

=== Elected officials ===
Elected officials as of January 3, 2025
U.S. House	James Comer (R)	KY 1
Ky. Senate	Jason Howell (R)	1
Ky. House	Steven Rudy (R)	1

== Education ==
- Fulton County School District
- Fulton Independent Schools

== Media ==
- WENK-AM 1240 "The Greatest Hits of All Time"
- WWGY 99.3 "Today's Best Music with Ace & TJ in the Morning"

== Communities ==
=== Cities ===
- Fulton
- Hickman (county seat)

=== Census-designated place ===
- Cayce

=== Other unincorporated communities ===
- Bondurant
- Brownsville
- Crutchfield
- Jordan
- Kentucky Bend
- Mabel
- Miller
- Riceville
- Sassafras Ridge
- State Line
- Tyler

== See also ==
- National Register of Historic Places listings in Fulton County, Kentucky
