= Harry M. Buland =

American sports coach, athletics administrator (1884–1933

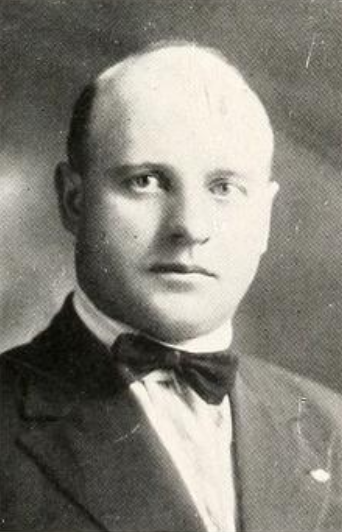
- Buland pictured in The Bethanian 1922, Bethany College yearbook

Biographical details
- Born: June 10, 1884; Minnesota, U.S.
- Died: July 14, 1933 (aged 49); Jacksonville, Illinois, U.S.
- Education: Ypsilanti Normal

Coaching career (HC unless noted)

Football
- 1910–1914: Jacksonville HS (IL)
- 1916–1919: Parkersburg HS (WV)
- 1920–1921: Bethany (WV)
- 1922: St. Petersburg HS (FL)
- 1922: St. Petersburg YMCA

Basketball
- 1910–1916: Jacksonville HS (IL)

Administrative career (AD unless noted)
- 1920–1922: Bethany (WV)

Head coaching record
- Overall: 11–9 (college football)

Harry Marshall Buland (June 10, 1884 – July 14, 1933) was an American football and basketball coach and athletics administrator. He served as the head football coach at Bethany College in Bethany, West Virginia from 1920 to 1921.

Buland attended Ypsilanti High School in Ypsilanti, Michigan. He was a graduate of Eastern Michigan University–then known as Ypsilanti Normal School. Buland also attended Cleary College—now known as Cleary University—in Ypsilanti. He later played on teams for the Toledo Athletic Club, Detroit Athletic Club, and Seattle Athletic Club.

Buland coached football and basketball at Jacksonville High School in Jacksonville, Illinois between 1910 and 1916. He then coached at Parkersburg High School in Parkersburg, West Virginia. Buland was the athletic director at Bethany from 1920 to 1922, when he left to become the athletic director at the YMCA in St. Petersburg, Florida. That fall, he coached the football teams for both the St. Petersburg YMCA and St. Petersburg High School. He was also the athletic director for St. Petersburg High School.

Buland died on July 14, 1933, in Jacksonville, after suffering a heart attack.

== Head coaching record ==
=== College football ===
Year	Team	Overall	Conference	Standing	Bowl/playoffs
Bethany Bison (Independent) (1920–1921)
1920	Bethany	5–5			
1921	Bethany	6–4			
Bethany:		11–9			
Total:		11–9			
