= Mabel, Kentucky =

Unincorporated community in Kentucky, United States

- Unincorporated community
- Location within the state of Kentucky Mabel (the United States)
- Coordinates: 36°33′57″N 89°16′41″W
- Country: United States
- State: Kentucky
- County: Fulton
- Elevation: 295 ft (90 m)
- Time zone: UTC-6 (Central (CST))
  - Summer (DST): UTC-5 (CST)
- GNIS feature ID: 2743908

Mabel is an unincorporated community in Fulton County, Kentucky, United States.
