= Mable Buland =

American professor of English

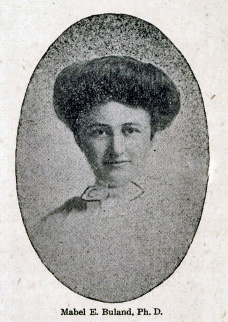
- Portrait of Mable E. Buland Campbell, circa 1909
- Born: Mable Electa Buland; 1885
- Died: 1961 (aged 75–76)
- Education: University of Washington; Yale University
- Occupation: English professor
- Known for: In 1912, Buland became the youngest Ph.D. in the U.S.
- Spouse: George Campbell (m. 1911)
- Children: 1

Mable Electa Buland Campbell (1885–1961) was a professor of English in Washington State during the early 20th century, and was, at one time, the youngest person to hold a Ph.D. in the United States. Buland was also active in women's groups associated with women's suffrage.

== Early life and education ==
Raised in the western United States, Buland earned both her B.A. in 1904 and her M.A. in 1908 from the University of Washington.

She did graduate work at Yale from 1906 to 1907, and from 1908 to 1909 and at Columbia University from 1907 to 1908 before receiving her Doctorate degree in English from Yale. At the time she completed her doctorate degree, Buland was the youngest Ph.D. in America. Her dissertation, The Presentation of Time in the Elizabethan Drama, was published in 1912.

== Career ==
While Buland was a Graduate student at the University of Washington, she worked as an Assistant in Pedagogy at the university. After receiving her graduate degree, Buland returned to Washington State to become a professor of English at the University of Puget Sound from 1909 to 1910. From 1910 to 1911, Buland taught English at Whitman College.

After leaving her positions in higher education, Buland served as the City Superintendent of Schools in Kalama, Washington From 1915 to 1916.

== Community involvement ==
Buland was an active member of the Kalama Woman's club, and served as the group's president during 1919. Women's clubs often offered women who had little or no access to education the opportunity to learn about current issues, particularly in Washington State, where women gained the right to vote before women in many other areas of the country. Women's clubs also focused significant time on issues surrounding women's suffrage.

In the fall of 1924, when Emma Smith Devoe resigned from her position as vice-chair of the Republican State Central Committee, Buland took over the position, which was meant to help establish women's clubs and to organize Republican women for upcoming elections.

== Personal life ==
In October 1911, Buland married George Norman Campbell, and in February 1917, the couple had a son, George Buland Campbell.
