= Fulton, Kentucky =

- City
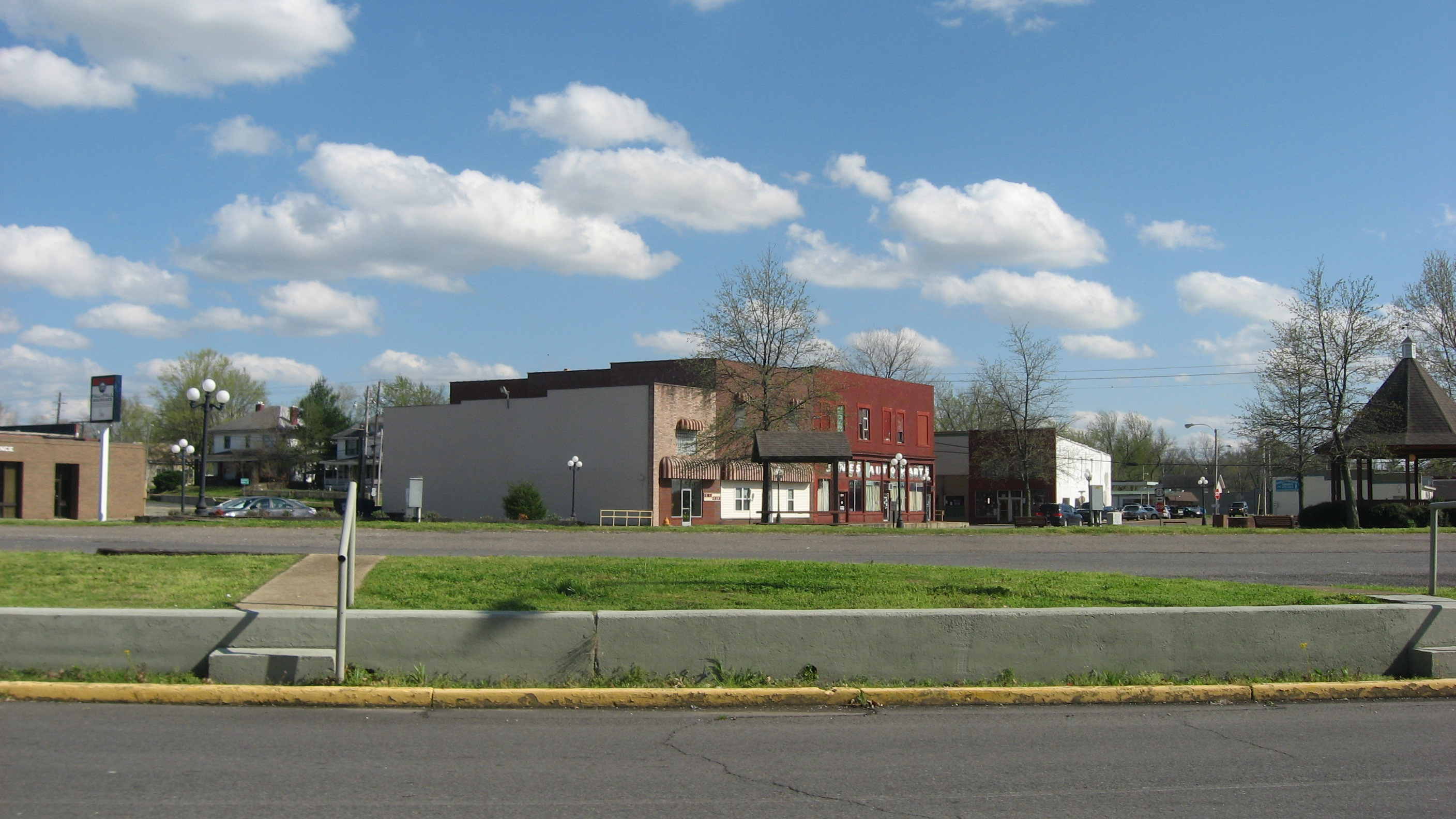
- Downtown Fulton

- Location of Fulton in Fulton County, Kentucky.
- Coordinates: 36°30′33″N 88°52′44″W
- Country: United States
- State: Kentucky
- County: Fulton

Area
  - Total: 2.98 sq mi (7.72 km^{2})
  - Land: 2.89 sq mi (7.49 km^{2})
  - Water: 0.089 sq mi (0.23 km^{2})
- Elevation: 360 ft (110 m)

Population (2020)
  - Total: 2,357
  - Estimate (2022): 2,301
  - Density: 814.9/sq mi (314.62/km^{2})
- Time zone: UTC-6 (Central (CST))
  - Summer (DST): UTC-5 (CDT)
- ZIP Code: 42041
- Area codes: 270 & 364
- FIPS code: 21-29566
- GNIS feature ID: 0492615
- Website: fulton-ky.com

Fulton is a home rule-class city in Fulton County, Kentucky, United States. The population was 2,357 at the 2020 census, down from 2,445 at the 2010 census. It was once known as the "Banana Capital of the World", because 70% of imported bananas to the U.S. used to be shipped through the city. Fulton is part of the Union City-Hickman, TN–KY Micropolitan Statistical Area.

== History ==
A post office was established in the community, then known as "Pontotoc", in 1847. The post office was renamed "Fulton" in 1861. It was formally incorporated by the state assembly in 1872. Fulton Station was located on the Paducah and Gulf Railroad, which stimulated growth in the county.

In the late 19th century, Ben M. Bogard, later the founder of the American Baptist Association in Texarkana, Texas, and long-time pastor of Antioch Missionary Baptist Church in Little Rock, Arkansas, served as a pastor in Fulton, where he was part of the Landmark Baptist movement. In the first decade of the 20th century, the Southern Baptist clergyman Monroe E. Dodd began his long ministry at a church in Fulton. For many years afterward, he was the pastor of First Baptist Church of Shreveport, Louisiana.

=== Banana Capital of the World ===
The United Fruit Co., now Chiquita, began shipping bananas from South America by steamship to New Orleans. The bananas were loaded onto railcars on top of 162-pound (73 kg) blocks of ice for the trip north. Fulton had the only ice house on the route north to Chicago. The bananas were re-iced with blocks from the Fulton Ice Plant, now closed. Empty railcars were pulled up to the side of the ice house, and the large blocks of ice were loaded end up, covering the entire box car. The bananas were laid on top of the ice to continue their journey. At one point, more than 70% of the bananas that were consumed in the US passed through Fulton.

From 1962 through 1992, Fulton held the annual International Banana Festival. The largest banana pudding in the world at 2,000 pounds (910 kg) was part of the banana parade. Since the early 21st century, the festival has been revived, including a contest for the largest banana pudding.

== Geography ==
Fulton is located in the southeast corner of Fulton County at 36°30′33″N 88°52′44″W (36.509156, -88.878768). Its southern border is the state line, across which is the city of South Fulton, Tennessee. According to the United States Census Bureau, Fulton has a total area of 2.9 square miles (7.6 km^{2}), of which 2.9 square miles (7.4 km^{2}) is land and 0.1 square miles (0.2 km^{2}), or 2.95%, is water.

== Demographics ==
Historical population
Census	Pop.	Note	%±
1880	826		—
1890	1,818		120.1%
1900	2,860		57.3%
1910	2,575		−10.0%
1920	3,415		32.6%
1930	3,502		2.5%
1940	3,308		−5.5%
1950	3,224		−2.5%
1960	3,265		1.3%
1970	3,250		−0.5%
1980	3,137		−3.5%
1990	3,078		−1.9%
2000	2,775		−9.8%
2010	2,445		−11.9%
2020	2,357		−3.6%
2022 (est.)	2,301		−2.4%
U.S. Decennial Census

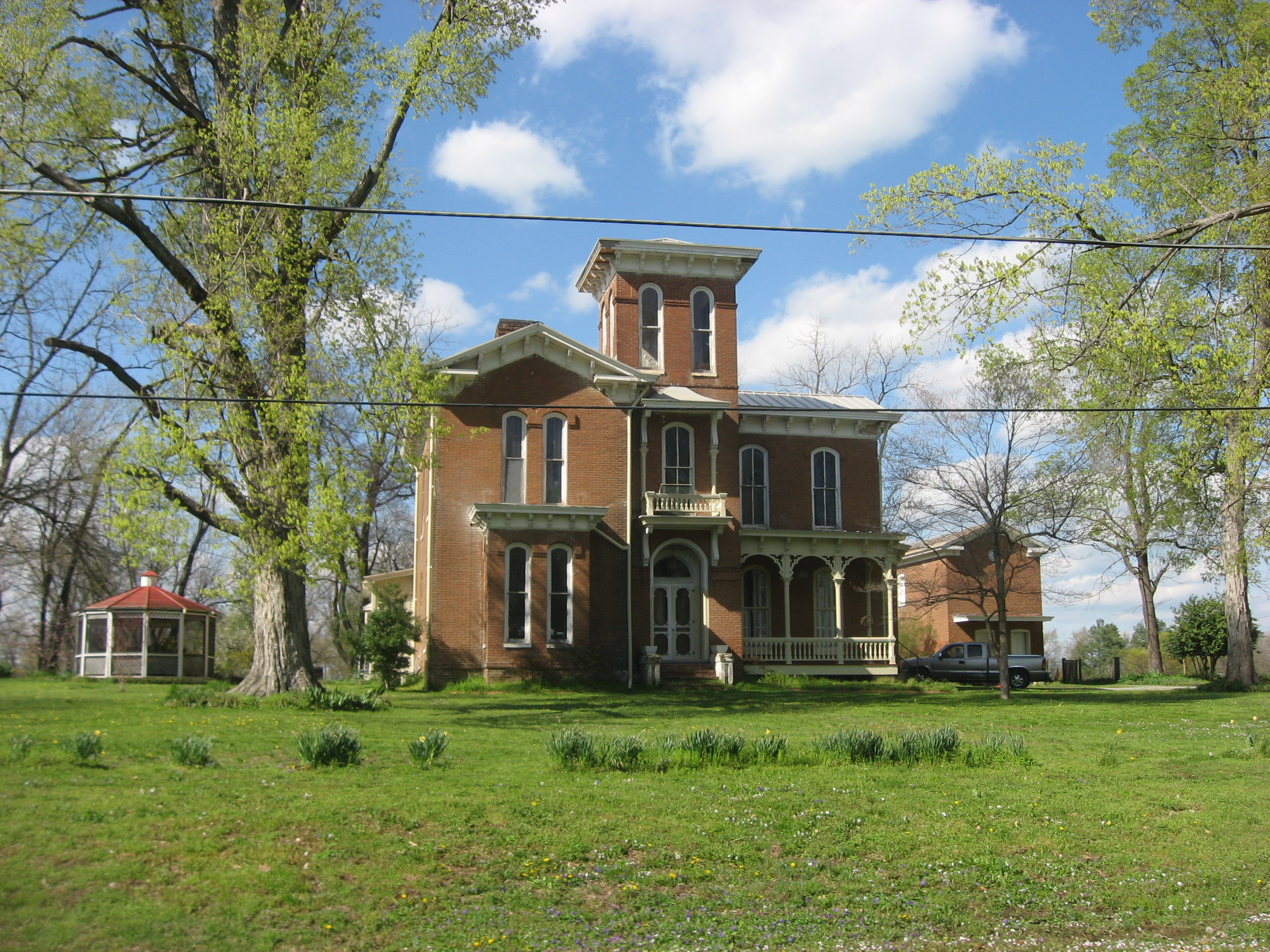
Jesse Whitesell House

=== 2020 census ===
As of the 2020 census, Fulton had a population of 2,357. The median age was 42.7 years. 23.0% of residents were under the age of 18 and 21.5% of residents were 65 years of age or older. For every 100 females there were 81.3 males, and for every 100 females age 18 and over there were 77.1 males age 18 and over.

99.0% of residents lived in urban areas, while 1.0% lived in rural areas.

There were 1,076 households in Fulton, of which 26.8% had children under the age of 18 living in them. Of all households, 28.2% were married-couple households, 22.8% were households with a male householder and no spouse or partner present, and 43.0% were households with a female householder and no spouse or partner present. About 39.0% of all households were made up of individuals and 16.6% had someone living alone who was 65 years of age or older. The census also counted 646 families.

There were 1,259 housing units, of which 14.5% were vacant. The homeowner vacancy rate was 3.0% and the rental vacancy rate was 11.0%.

Racial composition as of the 2020 census
Race	Number	Percent
White	1,486	63.0%
Black or African American	643	27.3%
American Indian and Alaska Native	8	0.3%
Asian	18	0.8%
Native Hawaiian and Other Pacific Islander	3	0.1%
Some other race	35	1.5%
Two or more races	164	7.0%
Hispanic or Latino (of any race)	44	1.9%

=== 2000 census ===
As of the census of 2000, there were 2,775 people, 1,225 households, and 753 families residing in the city. The population density was 983.0 inhabitants per square mile (379.5/km^{2}). There were 1,388 housing units at an average density of 491.7 per square mile (189.8/km^{2}). The racial makeup of the city was 67.35% White, 29.41% African American, 0.25% Native American, 0.68% Asian, 0.86% from other races, and 1.44% from two or more races. Hispanic or Latino of any race were 1.44% of the population.

There were 1,225 households, out of which 29.2% had children under the age of 18 living with them, 37.1% were married couples living together, 21.8% had a female householder with no husband present, and 38.5% were non-families. 36.0% of all households were made up of individuals, and 20.1% had someone living alone who was 65 years of age or older. The average household size was 2.22 and the average family size was 2.87.

In the city, the population was spread out, with 25.2% under the age of 18, 9.0% from 18 to 24, 22.4% from 25 to 44, 21.1% from 45 to 64, and 22.3% who were 65 years of age or older. The median age was 40 years. For every 100 females, there were 75.9 males. For every 100 females age 18 and over, there were 68.6 males.

The median income for a household in the city was $23,345, and the median income for a family was $27,625. Males had a median income of $26,029 versus $21,696 for females. The per capita income for the city was $16,260. About 22.4% of families and 24.6% of the population were below the poverty line, including 37.2% of those under age 18 and 17.3% of those age 65 or over.

== Government ==
The city of Fulton uses the Commission Plan form of government, which is composed of a mayor elected to a four-year term and four commissioners elected to two-year terms. The executive and legislative authority of the city are exercised by the city commission, and administrative responsibilities are the province of the city manager.

== Transportation ==
=== Rail ===
Amtrak, the national passenger rail system, provides service to Fulton. Fulton is one of only four cities in Kentucky with passenger rail service by Amtrak. The station is unmonitored and served by the City of New Orleans route running between New Orleans and Chicago.

== Sports and recreation ==
Fulton was longtime home minor league baseball. The Fulton Railroaders, played as members of the Kentucky-Illinois-Tennessee League, between 1911 and 1955. In 2005, the "Fulton Railroaders" nickname returned, as today Fulton hosts the summer collegiate baseball team, currently playing as members of the Ohio Valley League. The current Railroaders play their home games at Lohaus Field.

== Education ==
Fulton has a public library, a branch of the Fulton County Public Library.
