= Clinton, Kentucky =

- City
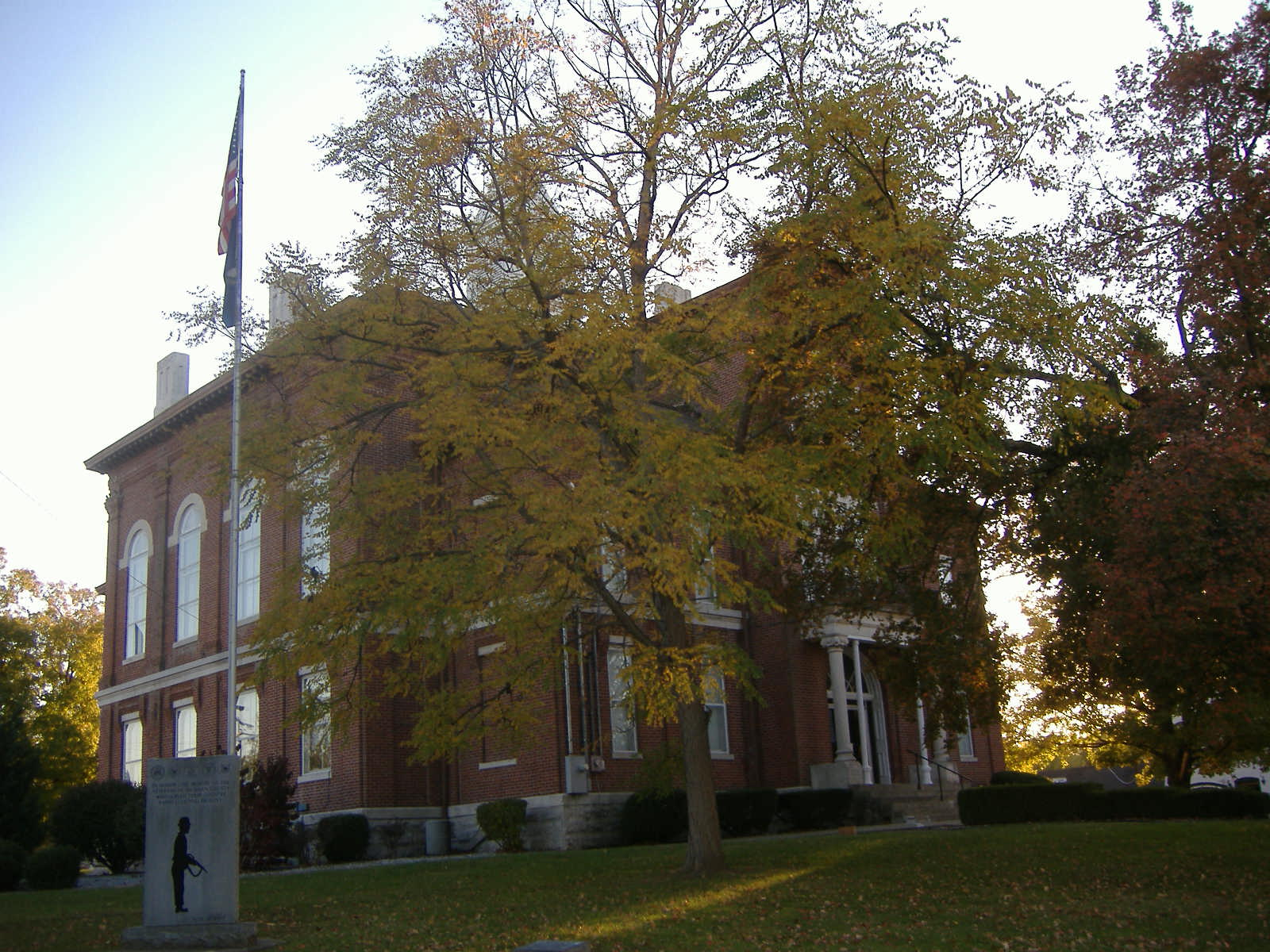
- Hickman County Courthouse in Clinton, Kentucky

- Location of Clinton in Hickman County, Kentucky.
- Coordinates: 36°40′1″N 88°59′39″W
- Country: United States
- State: Kentucky
- County: Hickman

Area
  - Total: 1.62 sq mi (4.19 km^{2})
  - Land: 1.61 sq mi (4.18 km^{2})
  - Water: 0.0039 sq mi (0.01 km^{2})
- Elevation: 371 ft (113 m)

Population (2020)
  - Total: 1,222
  - Density: 757.8/sq mi (292.59/km^{2})
- Time zone: UTC-6 (Central (CST))
  - Summer (DST): UTC-5 (CDT)
- ZIP code: 42031
- Area codes: 270 & 364
- FIPS code: 21-15742
- GNIS feature ID: 0489694
- Website: https://cityofclintonky.com/

Clinton is a home rule-class city and the county seat of Hickman County, Kentucky, United States. As of the 2020 census, Clinton had a population of 1,222.

== History ==
Clinton appears to have been named after a riverboat or military captain who was stationed at the location around the time it was settled in the late 1820s. Clinton was incorporated in 1831.

It was the home to Clinton College from 1871 to 1915.

== Geography ==
Clinton is located in central Hickman County at 36°40′1″N 88°59′39″W (36.667040, -88.994103). U.S. Route 51 passes through the center of town as Washington Street, leading north 30 miles (48 km) to Cairo, Illinois, and south 14 miles (23 km) to Fulton on the Tennessee border.

According to the United States Census Bureau, Clinton has a total area of 1.6 square miles (4.2 km^{2}), of which 0.004 square miles (0.01 km^{2}), or 0.29%, are water.

== Demographics ==
Historical population
Census	Pop.	Note	%±
1830	82		—
1860	264		—
1870	272		3.0%
1880	506		86.0%
1890	1,347		166.2%
1900	1,462		8.5%
1910	1,497		2.4%
1920	1,455		−2.8%
1930	1,204		−17.3%
1940	1,540		27.9%
1950	1,593		3.4%
1960	1,647		3.4%
1970	1,618		−1.8%
1980	1,720		6.3%
1990	1,547		−10.1%
2000	1,415		−8.5%
2010	1,388		−1.9%
2020	1,222		−12.0%
U.S. Decennial Census

At the 2000 census there were 1,415 people in 579 households, including 354 families, in the city. The population density was 858.5 inhabitants per square mile (331.5/km^{2}). There were 668 housing units at an average density of 405.3 per square mile (156.5/km^{2}). The racial makeup of the city was 70.46% White, 27.14% African American, 0.49% Native American, and 1.91% from two or more races. Hispanic or Latino of any race were 1.55%.

Of the 579 households 28.5% had children under the age of 18 living with them, 38.9% were married couples living together, 19.5% had a female householder with no husband present, and 38.7% were non-families. 36.1% of households were one person and 17.4% were one person aged 65 or older. The average household size was 2.18 and the average family size was 2.82.

The age distribution was 22.8% under the age of 18, 5.8% from 18 to 24, 24.6% from 25 to 44, 21.8% from 45 to 64, and 24.9% 65 or older. The median age was 42 years. For every 100 females, there were 72.6 males. For every 100 females age 18 and over, there were 66.0 males.

The median household income was $21,875 and the median family income was $27,847. Males had a median income of $29,375 versus $16,786 for females. The per capita income for the city was $15,236. About 26.8% of families and 31.6% of the population were below the poverty line, including 51.3% of those under age 18 and 21.4% of those age 65 or over.

== Education ==
Clinton has a lending library, the Hickman County Memorial Library. Clinton is also home to Hickman County High School.
