= Bardwell station =

- Illinois Central Railroad Station and Freight Depot
- U.S. National Register of Historic Places
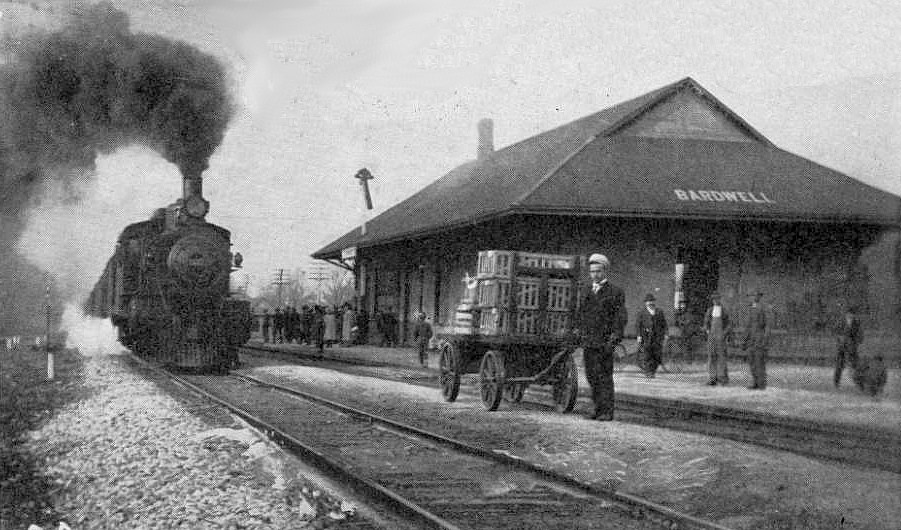
- A train arrives at the station, circa 1910

- Location within Kentucky Location within the United States
- Location: Front St., Bardwell, Kentucky
- Coordinates: 36°52′21″N 89°0′43″W
- Area: 1 acre (0.40 ha)
- Built: 1890
- Architect: Illinois Central Railroad
- NRHP reference No.: 76000860
- Added to NRHP: July 19, 1976

Bardwell station was a historic train station at the city of Bardwell in the far western part of the U.S. state of Kentucky. Constructed in the late nineteenth century along the railroad's main line, it was the center of life for local residents and served as a significant maintenance site for the railroad. As a simple functional structure, the depot qualified for designation as a historic site in 1976, but it no longer stands.

== History ==
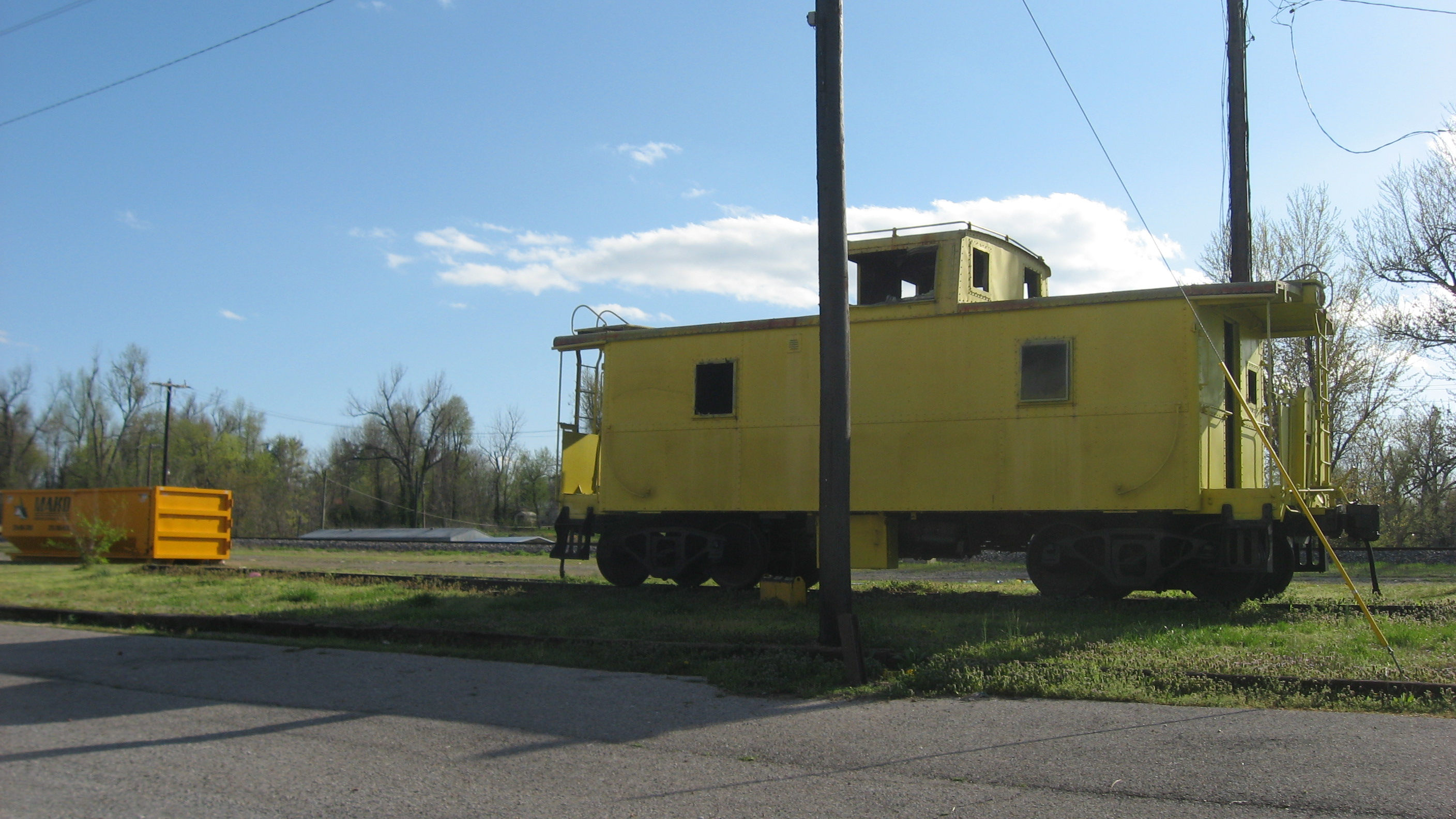
A caboose by the site of the depot, seen in 2013

When the Illinois Central Railroad reached Bardwell in the 1870s, its first "station" was a camp car temporarily placed along the tracks. A standing structure was soon built in the middle of the decade. During its existence, the first permanent building was the center of the community; when the General Assembly incorporated Bardwell as a city in the late 1870s, its boundaries were defined as being a circle with a radius of 0.5 miles (0.80 km) centered on the depot. This first permanent station remained until 1890, when a team of carpenters employed by the railroad erected a replacement building. Like its predecessor, the second permanent station sat at the heart of the city; Bardwell is platted with its streets parallel to the railroad line, and the depot's location places it in the heart of the small commercial district. By this time, the station was a key location for the railroad as well as for the community; as early as 1885, Bardwell was deemed one of the region's premier Illinois Central stations, and it had become the center of a very extensive grain and livestock trade. Services such as a water stop were placed at Bardwell, for it lay on the main line between Chicago and New Orleans; the railroad's grand Ohio River bridge at Cairo is just a short distance to the north. Locals have long remembered that Purchase native Alben W. Barkley typically began his railroad journeys back to Washington, D.C., while he was the Vice President of the United States.

Relations between railroad and residents extended past that of shipper and shipping company: the Illinois Central operated a seed-sales division to serve farmers along its lines, and Bardwell's station hosted multiple trains that the railroad used to show off the latest agricultural products. The station continued to serve both as seed showroom and transportation hub well into the twentieth century, but by the 1970s the railroad had ceased using the depot.

== Architecture ==
The second Illinois Central depot at Bardwell was typical of small-town railroad stations constructed in the late nineteenth century. Constructed without unnecessary decorations and built in a simple rectangular plan, it featured large doors and windows, a hip roof with wide eaves and simple brackets, and a loading dock with ramps for the freight doors. Exceptions to the simple rectangle were few: they included a signal tower, which was placed after the original construction, and an original bay window that was placed in order to facilitate a better view of trains for railroad employees inside the depot. Its walls were clapboard placed in an unusual manner: horizontal boards were placed midway between the ground and the roof on all sides of the building, but the remainder was covered with vertical boards. Part of the building's interior space was devoted to storage areas for railroad maintenance vehicles.

== Preservation ==
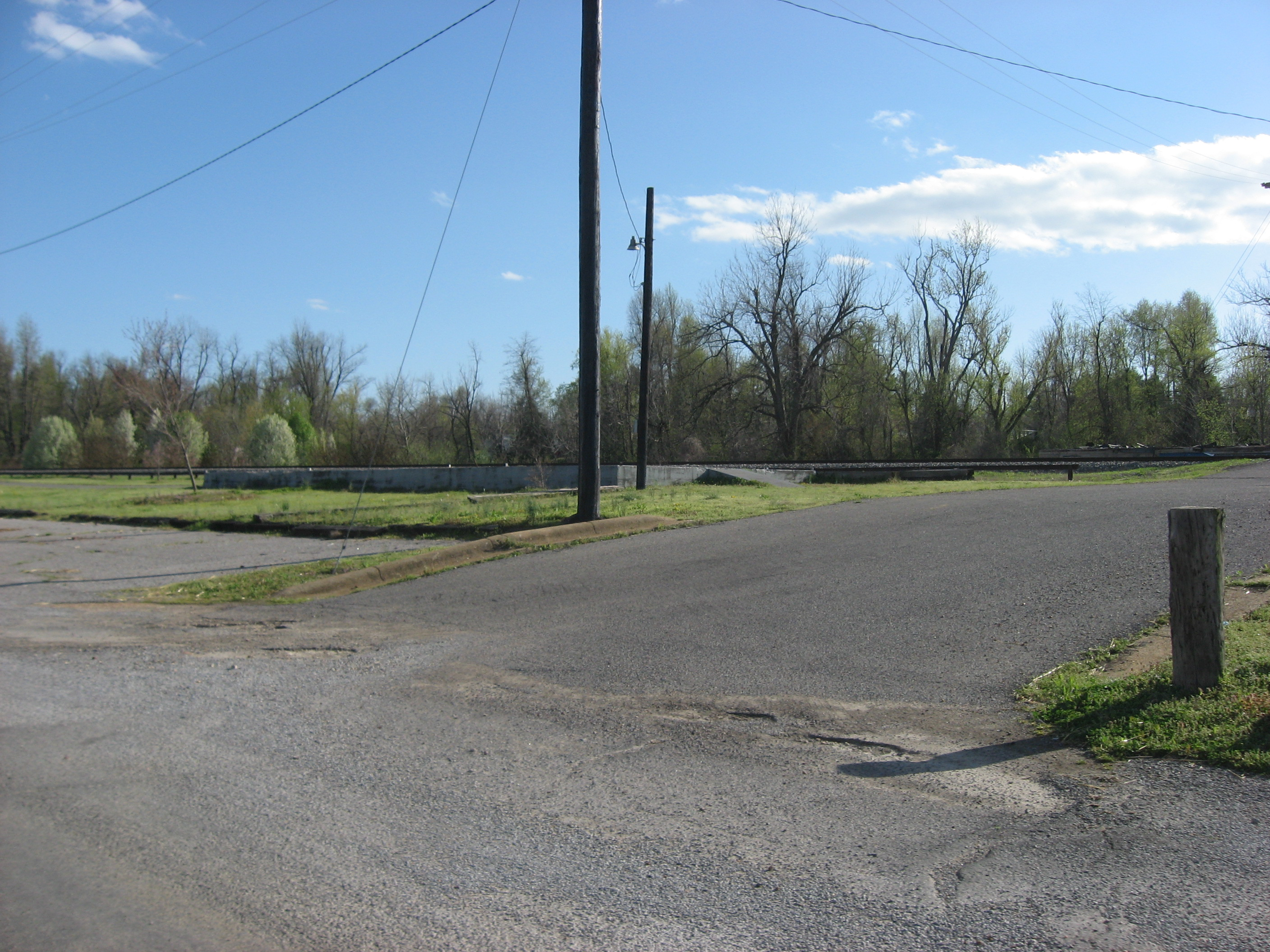
Site of the station in 2013

After the railroad ceased using the depot, local residents proposed its conversion into a library and museum in the 1970s, partly because all other historic Illinois Central stations between Cairo and Fulton, Kentucky had been demolished by 1976. In that year, the depot received recognition far beyond western Kentucky: on June 16, the National Park Service announced that the depot had been listed on the National Register of Historic Places as the Illinois Central Railroad Station and Freight Depot, qualifying both because of its place in local history and as a significant example of vernacular architecture. Despite its historic significance, the depot no longer stands; its site is now an empty lot along the rail line. The depot remains listed on the National Register despite its destruction; it is one of five Carlisle County locations on the Register, along with the Neville-Patterson-Lamkin House near Arlington, the George W. Stone House near Milburn, and the Marshall and Turk Sites, a pair of archaeological sites from the Mississippian culture located near Bardwell.

Preceding station	Illinois Central Railroad	Following station
Arlington toward New Orleans	Main Line	Wickliffe toward Chicago
