= National Register of Historic Places listings in Carlisle County, Kentucky =

Location of Carlisle County in Kentucky

This is a list of the National Register of Historic Places listings in Carlisle County, Kentucky.

It is intended to be a complete list of the properties on the National Register of Historic Places in Carlisle County, Kentucky, United States. The locations of National Register properties for which the latitude and longitude coordinates are included below, may be seen in a map.

There are 5 properties listed on the National Register in the county.

This National Park Service list is complete through NPS recent listings posted April 24, 2026.

== Current listings ==
	Name on the Register	Image	Date listed	Location	City or town	Description
1	Illinois Central Railroad Station and Freight Depot	Illinois Central Railroad Station and Freight Depot	July 19, 1976 (#76000860)	Front St. 36°52′21″N 89°00′43″W	Bardwell	Since destroyed
2	Marshall Site (15CE27)	Marshall Site (15CE27)	November 14, 1985 (#85002818)	Mississippi River bluff off Kentucky Route 1203, northwest of Bardwell; 36°54′00″N 89°05′04″W	Bardwell	
3	Neville-Patterson-Lamkin House		June 16, 1976 (#76000859)	Kentucky Route 80; 36°47′21″N 89°00′40″W	Arlington	
4	George W. Stone House	George W. Stone House	March 17, 1994 (#94000223)	7100 KY-80; 36°47′57″N 88°53′48″W	Milburn	
5	Turk Site (15CE6)	Turk Site (15CE6)	November 14, 1985 (#85002822)	Mississippi River bluff off Kentucky Route 1203, northwest of Bardwell; 36°53′41″N 89°05′07″W	Bardwell	

== See also ==
- List of National Historic Landmarks in Kentucky
- National Register of Historic Places listings in Kentucky
