= 1984 United States presidential election in Kentucky =

- November 6, 1984
- Turnout: 68.37%

Nominee	Ronald Reagan	Walter Mondale
Party	Republican	Democratic
Home state	California	Minnesota
Running mate	George H. W. Bush	Geraldine Ferraro
Electoral vote	9	0
Popular vote	822,782	539,589
Percentage	60.04%	39.37%

Reagan
50–60%
60–70%
70–80%
80–90%
90–100%
Mondale
40–50%
50–60%
60–70%
70–80%
80–90%
90–100%
Tie
40–50%
President before election
Ronald Reagan
Republican
Elected President
Ronald Reagan
Republican

The 1984 United States presidential election in Kentucky took place on November 6, 1984. All 50 states and the District of Columbia, were part of the 1984 United States presidential election. Kentucky voters chose nine electors to the Electoral College, which selected the president and vice president of the United States.

Kentucky was won by the Republican ticket of incumbent President Ronald Reagan of California and Vice President George H. W. Bush of Texas by a 20-point margin over Democratic ticket of former Vice President Walter Mondale of Minnesota and his running mate Representative Geraldine Ferraro of New York. Ferraro was the first major female candidate for the vice presidency.

The presidential election of 1984 was a very partisan election for Kentucky, with over 99% of the electorate voting either Democratic or Republican, though several other parties did appear on the ballot. Reagan carried 100 of Kentucky's counties; Mondale carried 19, mostly in the Eastern Kentucky Coalfield. One county–Gallatin County–split its two-party vote exactly evenly between the two nominees, with each receiving 1,042 votes.

Reagan became the first Republican to ever carry Carroll County, a highly secessionist rural Bluegrass county that had been the state's only county outside the coalfields to support George McGovern 12 years earlier. Kentucky weighed in for this election as 2 percentage points more Republican than the national average.

Reagan won Kentucky by 20.7%, a landslide margin slightly greater than his national margin, and a dramatic shift with respect to 1980, when Reagan only narrowly carried the state over the Southern Democrat Jimmy Carter by 1.5%. Mondale performed well in the Eastern Kentucky Coalfield, but relatively poorly in other traditionally Democratic areas of the state, such as the Bluegrass, the Jackson Purchase, and the Western Kentucky Coalfield, relative even to previous national landslide losers such as Adlai Stevenson in 1952 and 1956, John Davis in 1924, and James Cox in 1920. In the Western Coalfield, Reagan became only the second Republican (after Nixon in 1972) to carry Henderson County since 1928, and to ever carry Hopkins County. In the Bluegrass, Reagan became the second Republican, again after only Nixon in 1972, ever to carry Owen County, Henry County, Trimble County, Harrison County, and Franklin County, and the second since 1928 (after Nixon in 1972) to carry Shelby County, Bourbon County, Nicholas County, and Bath County. Concomitantly, Reagan became only the second Republican, after Nixon in 1972, to get over 60% of the vote in Kentucky, a feat which has been replicated in every election since 2012.

== Results ==
1984 United States presidential election in Kentucky
Party	Candidate	Votes	Percentage	Electoral votes
Republican	Ronald Reagan (incumbent)	822,782	60.04%	9
Democratic	Walter Mondale	539,589	39.37%	0
Socialist Workers Party	Melvin Mason	3,129	0.23%	0
Independent	Lyndon LaRouche	1,777	0.13%	0
National Unity	John B. Anderson (Note: The National Unity Party grew out of John B. Anderson’s 1980 presidential campaign. Although initially open to running, Anderson announced on April 26, 1984, that he would not run, though he remained on the ballot in Kentucky through ballot access efforts.)	1,479	0.11%	0
Citizen's Party	Sonia Johnson	599	0.04%	0
American Party	Delmar Dennis	429	0.03%	0
New Alliance Party	Dennis Serrette	350	0.03%	0
Communist Party	Gus Hall	327	0.02%	0
Totals		1,370,461	100.0%	9

=== Results by county ===
County	Ronald Reagan Republican		Walter Mondale Democratic		Melvin Mason Socialist Workers		Lyndon LaRouche Independent		John B. Anderson National Unity		Various candidates Other parties		Margin		Total votes cast
County	#	%	#	%	#	%	#	%	#	%	#	%	#	%	Total votes cast
Adair	4,500	70.93%	1,812	28.56%	10	0.16%	6	0.09%	4	0.06%	12	0.19%	2,688	42.37%	6,344
Allen	3,427	69.04%	1,521	30.64%	3	0.06%	4	0.08%	3	0.06%	6	0.12%	1,906	38.40%	4,964
Anderson	3,425	66.06%	1,717	33.11%	23	0.44%	6	0.12%	8	0.15%	6	0.12%	1,708	32.95%	5,185
Ballard	1,663	45.13%	2,002	54.33%	3	0.08%	10	0.27%	3	0.08%	4	0.11%	-339	-9.20%	3,685
Barren	7,717	62.86%	4,503	36.68%	16	0.13%	22	0.18%	7	0.06%	12	0.10%	3,214	26.18%	12,277
Bath	2,020	52.88%	1,781	46.62%	2	0.05%	7	0.18%	6	0.16%	4	0.10%	239	6.26%	3,820
Bell	7,249	55.93%	5,490	42.36%	163	1.26%	13	0.10%	21	0.16%	25	0.19%	1,759	13.57%	12,961
Boone	12,690	71.90%	4,853	27.50%	16	0.09%	32	0.18%	28	0.16%	30	0.17%	7,837	44.40%	17,649
Bourbon	3,836	58.54%	2,649	40.42%	35	0.53%	11	0.17%	11	0.17%	11	0.17%	1,187	18.12%	6,553
Boyd	10,925	52.98%	9,601	46.56%	15	0.07%	33	0.16%	18	0.09%	29	0.14%	1,324	6.42%	20,621
Boyle	5,675	62.53%	3,378	37.22%	8	0.09%	5	0.06%	5	0.06%	5	0.06%	2,297	25.31%	9,076
Bracken	1,812	60.89%	1,136	38.17%	10	0.34%	13	0.44%	3	0.10%	2	0.07%	676	22.72%	2,976
Breathitt	2,855	45.25%	3,435	54.45%	9	0.14%	2	0.03%	2	0.03%	6	0.10%	-580	-9.20%	6,309
Breckinridge	4,432	62.14%	2,669	37.42%	3	0.04%	8	0.11%	6	0.08%	14	0.20%	1,763	24.72%	7,132
Bullitt	9,556	65.11%	5,005	34.10%	59	0.40%	29	0.20%	17	0.12%	10	0.07%	4,551	31.01%	14,676
Butler	3,121	74.47%	1,055	25.17%	1	0.02%	7	0.17%	3	0.07%	4	0.10%	2,066	49.30%	4,191
Caldwell	3,162	55.93%	2,427	42.93%	44	0.78%	11	0.19%	3	0.05%	6	0.11%	735	13.00%	5,653
Calloway	6,442	55.94%	5,028	43.66%	11	0.10%	14	0.12%	9	0.08%	11	0.10%	1,414	12.28%	11,515
Campbell	21,473	69.99%	9,068	29.56%	19	0.06%	54	0.18%	33	0.11%	32	0.10%	12,405	40.43%	30,679
Carlisle	1,308	50.15%	1,277	48.96%	11	0.42%	6	0.23%	4	0.15%	2	0.08%	31	1.19%	2,608
Carroll	1,824	53.65%	1,564	46.00%	1	0.03%	7	0.21%	1	0.03%	3	0.09%	260	7.65%	3,400
Carter	4,656	53.67%	3,985	45.94%	3	0.03%	13	0.15%	7	0.08%	11	0.13%	671	7.73%	8,675
Casey	4,356	79.01%	1,122	20.35%	17	0.31%	5	0.09%	7	0.13%	6	0.11%	3,234	58.66%	5,513
Christian	10,708	66.06%	5,432	33.51%	21	0.13%	12	0.07%	9	0.06%	27	0.17%	5,276	32.55%	16,209
Clark	6,130	62.82%	3,595	36.84%	4	0.04%	11	0.11%	15	0.15%	3	0.03%	2,535	25.98%	9,758
Clay	4,772	74.26%	1,634	25.43%	4	0.06%	4	0.06%	8	0.12%	4	0.06%	3,138	48.83%	6,426
Clinton	3,459	80.03%	838	19.39%	3	0.07%	5	0.12%	2	0.05%	15	0.35%	2,621	60.64%	4,322
Crittenden	2,167	59.16%	1,483	40.49%	2	0.05%	4	0.11%	2	0.05%	5	0.14%	684	18.67%	3,663
Cumberland	2,729	77.77%	766	21.83%	4	0.11%	2	0.06%	1	0.03%	7	0.20%	1,963	55.94%	3,509
Daviess	19,495	58.92%	13,347	40.34%	136	0.41%	53	0.16%	29	0.09%	26	0.08%	6,148	18.58%	33,086
Edmonson	3,001	71.05%	1,200	28.41%	19	0.45%	1	0.02%	1	0.02%	2	0.05%	1,801	42.64%	4,224
Elliott	601	26.20%	1,683	73.37%	4	0.17%	1	0.04%	1	0.04%	4	0.17%	-1,082	-47.17%	2,294
Estill	3,512	68.57%	1,593	31.10%	3	0.06%	5	0.10%	4	0.08%	5	0.10%	1,919	37.47%	5,122
Fayette	51,993	63.60%	28,961	35.43%	479	0.59%	72	0.09%	140	0.17%	101	0.12%	23,032	28.17%	81,746
Fleming	2,824	63.33%	1,616	36.24%	3	0.07%	8	0.18%	5	0.11%	3	0.07%	1,208	27.09%	4,459
Floyd	5,218	33.57%	10,259	66.00%	19	0.12%	23	0.15%	7	0.05%	17	0.11%	-5,041	-32.43%	15,543
Franklin	11,057	58.12%	7,790	40.95%	124	0.65%	17	0.09%	19	0.10%	17	0.09%	3,267	17.17%	19,024
Fulton	1,780	53.45%	1,534	46.07%	2	0.06%	10	0.30%	1	0.03%	3	0.09%	246	7.38%	3,330
Gallatin	1,042	49.78%	1,042	49.78%	4	0.19%	3	0.14%	1	0.05%	1	0.05%	0	0.00%	2,093
Garrard	3,284	67.21%	1,566	32.05%	26	0.53%	4	0.08%	4	0.08%	2	0.04%	1,718	35.16%	4,886
Grant	2,840	61.70%	1,685	36.61%	47	1.02%	18	0.39%	5	0.11%	8	0.17%	1,155	25.09%	4,603
Graves	7,287	51.43%	6,759	47.70%	64	0.45%	35	0.25%	10	0.07%	15	0.11%	528	3.73%	14,170
Grayson	5,524	71.03%	2,200	28.29%	31	0.40%	9	0.12%	4	0.05%	9	0.12%	3,324	42.74%	7,777
Green	3,210	66.35%	1,611	33.30%	7	0.14%	5	0.10%	2	0.04%	3	0.06%	1,599	33.05%	4,838
Greenup	7,451	51.52%	6,923	47.87%	25	0.17%	32	0.22%	11	0.08%	20	0.14%	528	3.65%	14,462
Hancock	1,967	59.59%	1,287	38.99%	33	1.00%	7	0.21%	3	0.09%	4	0.12%	680	20.60%	3,301
Hardin	14,293	68.81%	6,329	30.47%	83	0.40%	21	0.10%	29	0.14%	16	0.08%	7,964	38.34%	20,771
Harlan	6,959	47.14%	7,663	51.91%	46	0.31%	26	0.18%	23	0.16%	45	0.30%	-704	-4.77%	14,762
Harrison	3,467	58.86%	2,405	40.83%	1	0.02%	6	0.10%	4	0.07%	7	0.12%	1,062	18.03%	5,890
Hart	3,065	57.06%	2,278	42.41%	3	0.06%	6	0.11%	4	0.07%	16	0.30%	787	14.65%	5,372
Henderson	7,389	51.88%	6,795	47.71%	11	0.08%	24	0.17%	8	0.06%	15	0.11%	594	4.17%	14,242
Henry	2,802	54.83%	2,279	44.60%	7	0.14%	9	0.18%	4	0.08%	9	0.18%	523	10.23%	5,110
Hickman	1,380	56.63%	1,049	43.04%	1	0.04%	2	0.08%	2	0.08%	3	0.12%	331	13.59%	2,437
Hopkins	9,368	57.95%	6,743	41.71%	11	0.07%	10	0.06%	15	0.09%	19	0.12%	2,625	16.24%	16,166
Jackson	3,856	87.38%	542	12.28%	8	0.18%	3	0.07%	1	0.02%	3	0.07%	3,314	75.10%	4,413
Jefferson	167,640	57.66%	122,133	42.01%	174	0.06%	301	0.10%	314	0.11%	188	0.06%	45,507	15.65%	290,750
Jessamine	7,081	74.10%	2,379	24.90%	62	0.65%	16	0.17%	8	0.08%	10	0.10%	4,702	49.20%	9,556
Johnson	5,225	62.58%	3,078	36.87%	12	0.14%	8	0.10%	8	0.10%	18	0.22%	2,147	25.71%	8,349
Kenton	34,304	69.66%	14,642	29.73%	32	0.06%	99	0.20%	82	0.17%	86	0.17%	19,662	39.93%	49,245
Knott	1,728	27.66%	4,487	71.81%	7	0.11%	5	0.08%	8	0.13%	13	0.21%	-2,759	-44.15%	6,248
Knox	5,730	65.87%	2,932	33.71%	4	0.05%	11	0.13%	9	0.10%	13	0.15%	2,798	32.16%	8,699
LaRue	2,873	65.30%	1,514	34.41%	1	0.02%	6	0.14%	5	0.11%	1	0.02%	1,359	30.89%	4,400
Laurel	9,621	74.41%	3,267	25.27%	12	0.09%	12	0.09%	8	0.06%	9	0.07%	6,354	49.14%	12,929
Lawrence	2,713	54.71%	2,223	44.83%	9	0.18%	3	0.06%	1	0.02%	10	0.20%	490	9.88%	4,959
Lee	1,862	70.53%	768	29.09%	4	0.15%	3	0.11%	2	0.08%	1	0.04%	1,094	41.44%	2,640
Leslie	3,385	75.64%	1,075	24.02%	7	0.16%	2	0.04%	1	0.02%	5	0.11%	2,310	51.62%	4,475
Letcher	4,073	46.13%	4,707	53.31%	18	0.20%	12	0.14%	8	0.09%	12	0.14%	-634	-7.18%	8,830
Lewis	3,445	69.64%	1,484	30.00%	3	0.06%	7	0.14%	4	0.08%	4	0.08%	1,961	39.64%	4,947
Lincoln	3,996	61.27%	2,498	38.30%	7	0.11%	9	0.14%	3	0.05%	9	0.14%	1,498	22.97%	6,522
Livingston	1,866	47.96%	2,007	51.58%	3	0.08%	6	0.15%	3	0.08%	6	0.15%	-141	-3.62%	3,891
Logan	4,889	58.83%	3,347	40.28%	44	0.53%	12	0.14%	9	0.11%	9	0.11%	1,542	18.55%	8,310
Lyon	969	42.97%	1,272	56.41%	7	0.31%	5	0.22%	1	0.04%	1	0.04%	-303	-13.44%	2,255
Madison	11,309	63.09%	6,509	36.31%	61	0.34%	10	0.06%	23	0.13%	14	0.08%	4,800	26.78%	17,926
Magoffin	2,343	44.22%	2,942	55.53%	3	0.06%	3	0.06%	1	0.02%	6	0.11%	-599	-11.31%	5,298
Marion	3,305	53.66%	2,835	46.03%	5	0.08%	1	0.02%	4	0.06%	9	0.15%	470	7.63%	6,159
Marshall	5,152	47.19%	5,725	52.44%	2	0.02%	16	0.15%	6	0.05%	16	0.15%	-573	-5.25%	10,917
Martin	3,238	68.03%	1,471	30.90%	8	0.17%	6	0.13%	9	0.19%	28	0.59%	1,767	37.13%	4,760
Mason	3,751	58.19%	2,663	41.31%	7	0.11%	6	0.09%	11	0.17%	8	0.12%	1,088	16.88%	6,446
McCracken	12,903	50.08%	12,535	48.65%	242	0.94%	20	0.08%	25	0.10%	40	0.16%	368	1.43%	25,765
McCreary	4,028	70.58%	1,609	28.19%	28	0.49%	13	0.23%	18	0.32%	11	0.19%	2,419	42.39%	5,707
McLean	1,942	50.03%	1,917	49.38%	5	0.13%	8	0.21%	5	0.13%	5	0.13%	25	0.65%	3,882
Meade	3,820	60.19%	2,503	39.44%	1	0.02%	13	0.20%	4	0.06%	6	0.09%	1,317	20.75%	6,347
Menifee	785	44.35%	956	54.01%	19	1.07%	3	0.17%	4	0.23%	3	0.17%	-171	-9.66%	1,770
Mercer	4,592	63.88%	2,516	35.00%	63	0.88%	8	0.11%	6	0.08%	4	0.06%	2,076	28.88%	7,189
Metcalfe	2,349	59.56%	1,575	39.93%	2	0.05%	10	0.25%	3	0.08%	5	0.13%	774	19.63%	3,944
Monroe	4,760	81.47%	1,052	18.00%	8	0.14%	9	0.15%	7	0.12%	7	0.12%	3,708	63.47%	5,843
Montgomery	3,864	60.59%	2,490	39.05%	6	0.09%	8	0.13%	6	0.09%	3	0.05%	1,374	21.54%	6,377
Morgan	1,834	42.35%	2,481	57.28%	5	0.12%	3	0.07%	3	0.07%	5	0.12%	-647	-14.93%	4,331
Muhlenberg	6,094	49.64%	6,157	50.15%	6	0.05%	10	0.08%	4	0.03%	6	0.05%	-63	-0.51%	12,277
Nelson	6,044	58.57%	4,199	40.69%	44	0.43%	10	0.10%	16	0.16%	6	0.06%	1,845	17.88%	10,319
Nicholas	1,535	57.38%	1,107	41.38%	22	0.82%	5	0.19%	6	0.22%	0	0.00%	428	16.00%	2,675
Ohio	5,119	60.82%	3,253	38.65%	7	0.08%	14	0.17%	6	0.07%	18	0.21%	1,866	22.17%	8,417
Oldham	8,112	73.81%	2,857	25.99%	3	0.03%	5	0.05%	8	0.07%	6	0.05%	5,255	47.82%	10,991
Owen	1,778	52.17%	1,612	47.30%	5	0.15%	3	0.09%	5	0.15%	5	0.15%	166	4.87%	3,408
Owsley	1,466	79.20%	375	20.26%	3	0.16%	2	0.11%	2	0.11%	3	0.16%	1,091	58.94%	1,851
Pendleton	2,767	63.76%	1,529	35.23%	29	0.67%	4	0.09%	3	0.07%	8	0.18%	1,238	28.53%	4,340
Perry	5,218	49.52%	5,258	49.90%	29	0.28%	7	0.07%	8	0.08%	17	0.16%	-40	-0.38%	10,537
Pike	11,869	42.68%	15,817	56.87%	39	0.14%	38	0.14%	23	0.08%	26	0.09%	-3,948	-14.19%	27,812
Powell	2,269	58.83%	1,575	40.83%	3	0.08%	4	0.10%	1	0.03%	5	0.13%	694	18.00%	3,857
Pulaski	14,434	76.40%	4,384	23.20%	10	0.05%	23	0.12%	18	0.10%	24	0.13%	10,050	53.20%	18,893
Robertson	567	54.36%	467	44.77%	5	0.48%	2	0.19%	2	0.19%	0	0.00%	100	9.59%	1,043
Rockcastle	4,328	79.73%	1,089	20.06%	2	0.04%	3	0.06%	1	0.02%	5	0.09%	3,239	59.67%	5,428
Rowan	3,698	57.16%	2,748	42.47%	9	0.14%	5	0.08%	7	0.11%	3	0.05%	950	14.69%	6,470
Russell	4,476	75.18%	1,448	24.32%	7	0.12%	8	0.13%	7	0.12%	8	0.13%	3,028	50.86%	5,954
Scott	4,461	62.44%	2,606	36.48%	47	0.66%	7	0.10%	9	0.13%	14	0.20%	1,855	25.96%	7,144
Shelby	5,390	61.68%	3,326	38.06%	5	0.06%	5	0.06%	8	0.09%	5	0.06%	2,064	23.62%	8,739
Simpson	3,073	58.70%	2,140	40.88%	5	0.10%	8	0.15%	5	0.10%	4	0.08%	933	17.82%	5,235
Spencer	1,456	61.38%	910	38.36%	1	0.04%	1	0.04%	3	0.13%	1	0.04%	546	23.02%	2,372
Taylor	5,932	64.16%	3,286	35.54%	7	0.08%	7	0.08%	2	0.02%	11	0.12%	2,646	28.62%	9,245
Todd	2,364	55.23%	1,505	35.16%	98	2.29%	64	1.50%	73	1.71%	176	4.11%	859	20.07%	4,280
Trigg	2,512	56.63%	1,905	42.94%	3	0.07%	10	0.23%	2	0.05%	4	0.09%	607	13.69%	4,436
Trimble	1,389	55.78%	1,088	43.69%	3	0.12%	6	0.24%	1	0.04%	3	0.12%	301	12.09%	2,490
Union	2,524	44.78%	3,090	54.82%	4	0.07%	10	0.18%	5	0.09%	4	0.07%	-566	-10.04%	5,637
Warren	16,167	66.87%	7,937	32.83%	12	0.05%	27	0.11%	14	0.06%	21	0.09%	8,230	34.04%	24,178
Washington	2,804	60.24%	1,786	38.37%	50	1.07%	2	0.04%	3	0.06%	10	0.21%	1,018	21.87%	4,655
Wayne	4,449	66.00%	2,277	33.78%	3	0.04%	5	0.07%	2	0.03%	5	0.07%	2,172	32.22%	6,741
Webster	2,504	44.87%	3,042	54.52%	7	0.13%	15	0.27%	3	0.05%	9	0.16%	-538	-9.65%	5,580
Whitley	7,851	68.17%	3,575	31.04%	17	0.15%	28	0.24%	29	0.25%	16	0.14%	4,276	37.13%	11,516
Wolfe	1,257	46.68%	1,394	51.76%	24	0.89%	5	0.19%	5	0.19%	8	0.30%	-137	-5.08%	2,693
Woodford	4,746	66.73%	2,290	32.20%	49	0.69%	7	0.10%	9	0.13%	11	0.15%	2,456	34.53%	7,112
Totals	822,782	60.04%	539,589	39.37%	3,129	0.23%	1,777	0.13%	1,479	0.11%	1,705	0.12%	283,193	20.67%	1,370,461

==== Counties that flipped from Democratic to Republican ====
- Anderson
- Bath
- Bell
- Bourbon
- Boyd
- Boyle
- Bracken
- Caldwell
- Calloway
- Carlisle
- Carroll
- Clark
- Daviess
- Franklin
- Fulton
- Gallatin (became tied)
- Grant
- Graves
- Greenup
- Hancock
- Harrison
- Henderson
- Henry
- Hickman
- Hopkins
- LaRue
- Logan
- Marion
- Mason
- McCracken
- McLean
- Meade
- Mercer
- Montgomery
- Nelson
- Nicholas
- Owen
- Pendleton
- Powell
- Robertson
- Rowan
- Scott
- Shelby
- Simpson
- Spencer
- Todd
- Trigg
- Trimble
- Washington
- Woodford

== See also ==
- Presidency of Ronald Reagan
