= Marshall Site =

Archaeological site in Kentucky, US

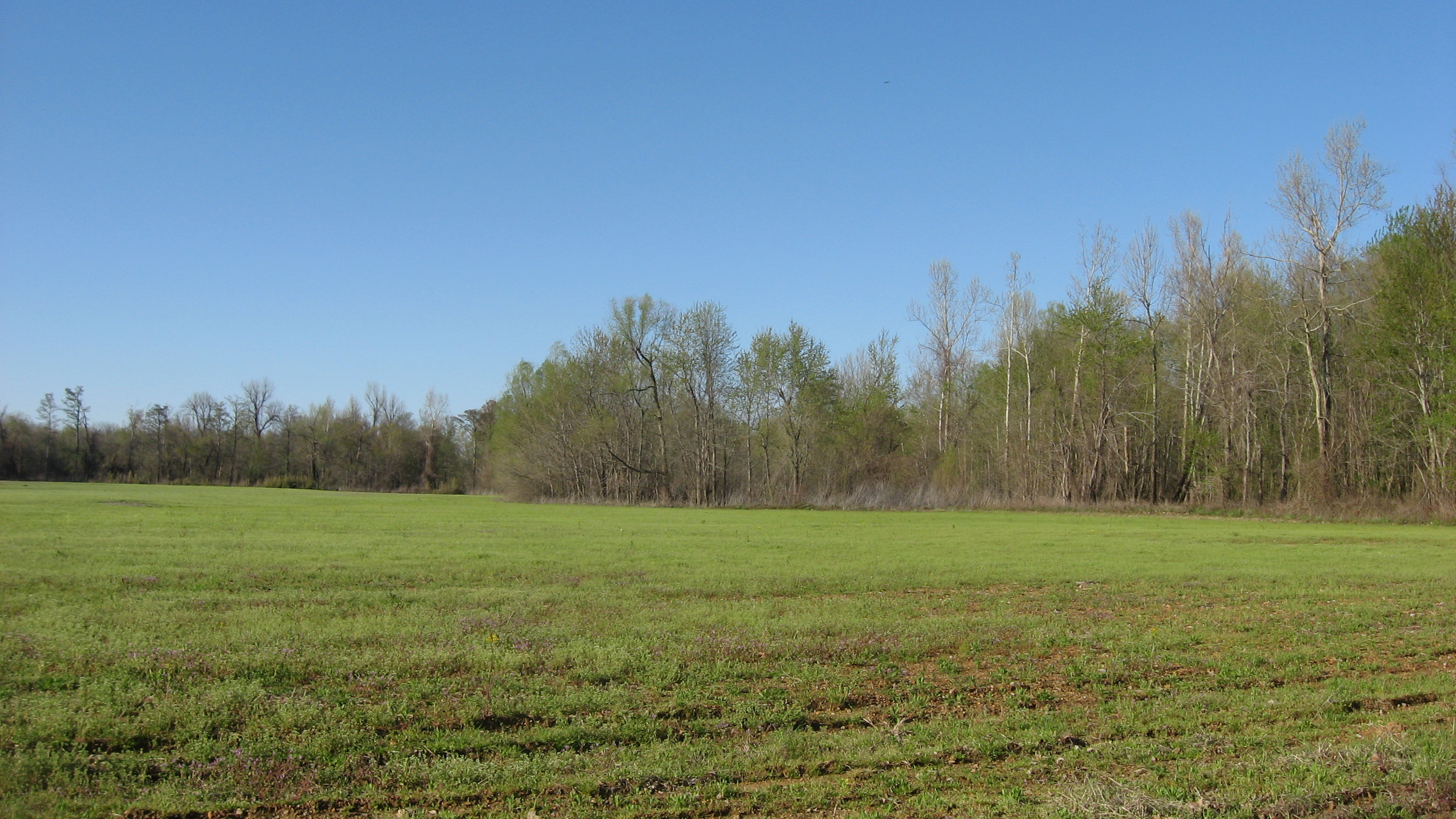
- Looking toward the site from the southwest

- Location in Kentucky today
- 36°53′52″N 89°5′5″W
- Cultures: Late Woodland period, Mississippian culture
- Location: Bardwell, Kentucky, Carlisle County, Kentucky, USA
- Region: Jackson Purchase

History
- Built: 900 CE
- Abandoned: 1300 CE

The Marshall Site (15CE27) is an Early Mississippian culture archaeological site near Bardwell in Carlisle County, Kentucky, on a bluff spur overlooking the Mississippi River floodplain. The site was occupied from about 900 to 1300 CE during the James Bayou Phase of the local chronology and was abandoned sometime during the succeeding Dorena Phase. Its inhabitants may have moved to the Turk Site, located on the nearest adjacent bluff spur to the south, and founded about this time. It is several miles south of the Wickliffe Mounds Site.

== Site description ==
Marshall is a large village site, with evidence of once having had platform mounds and earthworks, although it is unclear from what period these mounds would date. It is one of the few James Bayou Phase sites to be extensively excavated. Because it was abandoned, its archaeological features were undisturbed by later occupations.

In 1985, an archaeological team from the University of Illinois conducted excavations at Marshall, with some work being performed by the university's summer field school. Four locations were excavated: spots on the eastern and western sides of the central knoll, another on a spur to the north, and a fourth at the bluff edge to the southwest of the center. On the eastern side of the knoll, a substantial midden was investigated and found to possess good stratigraphy; a piece of charcoal from the midden was radiocarbon dated to c. 1027 CE. On the knoll's western side, excavations examined the remain of house under a midden, finding Mississippian culture pottery tempered with mussel shells. In contrast, the excavation north of the knoll revealed the presence of numerous linear features interpreted as being the remains of several houses constructed on the site in sequence. Little was found in the excavation site to the southwest of the knoll; the excavators tested a horseshoe-shaped earthwork but could establish virtually nothing aside from a conclusive determination that it was the site's southwestern corner.

== See also ==
- National Register of Historic Places listings in Carlisle County, Kentucky
