= Turk Site =

Archaeological site in Kentucky, US

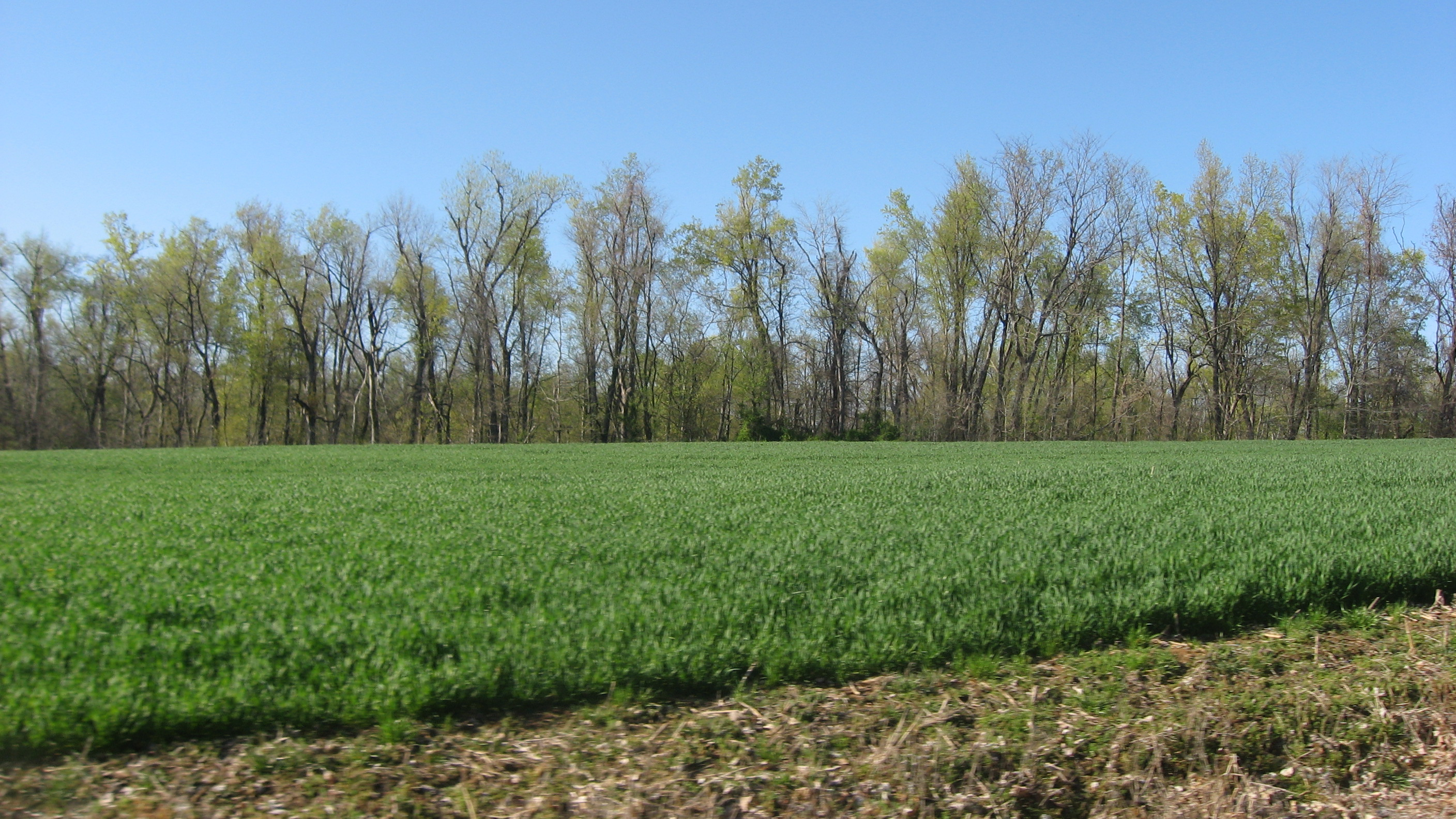
- Looking toward the site from the south

- Location within Kentucky today
- 36°53′41.17″N 89°5′6.79″W
- Cultures: Mississippian culture
- Location: Bardwell, Kentucky, Carlisle County, Kentucky, US
- Region: Jackson Purchase

Site notes
- Architectural styles: Platform mounds, Plaza

The Turk Site (15CE6) is a Mississippian culture archaeological site located near Bardwell in Carlisle County, Kentucky, on a bluff spur overlooking the Mississippi River floodplain.

== Site ==
The 2.5 hectares (6.2 acres) site was occupied primarily during the Dorena Phase (1100 to 1300 CE) and into the Medley Phase (1300-1500 CE) of the local chronology. Its inhabitants may have moved from the Marshall Site, which is a slightly older settlement located on the nearest adjacent bluff spur.

For a regional administrative center, Turk is a small site, but this is because of constraints placed on it by the geography of the bluff spur it sits on. The layout of the site is characteristically Mississippian, with a number of platform mounds surrounding a central plaza.

The earliest published investigation at the site was that of Robert Loughridge, published in 1888; the most extensive work at the site was conducted under Richard Edging and published in 1985.

== See also ==
- National Register of Historic Places listings in Carlisle County, Kentucky
- Mississippian stone statuary
- Southeastern Ceremonial Complex
- List of Mississippian sites
