= 1988 United States presidential election in Kentucky =

- November 8, 1988
- Turnout: 66.6% ▼

Nominee	George H. W. Bush	Michael Dukakis
Party	Republican	Democratic
Home state	Texas	Massachusetts
Running mate	Dan Quayle	Lloyd Bentsen
Electoral vote	9	0
Popular vote	734,281	580,368
Percentage	55.52%	43.88%

Bush
40–50%
50–60%
60–70%
70–80%
80–90%
90–100%
Dukakis
40–50%
50–60%
60–70%
70–80%
80–90%
90–100%
Other
Tie
No Votes
President before election
Ronald Reagan
Republican
Elected President
George H. W. Bush
Republican

The 1988 United States presidential election in Kentucky took place on November 8, 1988. All 50 states and the District of Columbia were part of the 1988 United States presidential election. Kentucky voters chose nine electors to the Electoral College, which selected the president and vice president. Kentucky was won by incumbent Vice President George H. W. Bush of Texas, who was running against Massachusetts Governor Michael Dukakis. Bush ran with Indiana Senator Dan Quayle for vice president, and Dukakis ran with Texas Senator Lloyd Bentsen.

In the 1980s, Kentucky was a swing state, having voted for the winner of every presidential election from 1964 on. However, Mitch McConnell's narrow win in the 1984 Senate election represented a significant shift of the state towards the Republican Party at the federal level.

Bush carried Kentucky by 11.6 percentage points on election day, the state weighing in as 4 points more Republican than the national average. Bush carried a majority of Kentucky's counties, including the most highly populated counties: Jefferson County, home to Louisville; Fayette County, home to Lexington; Daviess County, home to Owensboro; and Kenton and Campbell Counties, in the Cincinnati area. Dukakis' strength was mostly isolated to rural counties in the Eastern Coalfield and the Jackson Purchase.

As of the 2024 presidential election, this remains the last time that Jefferson County has voted for a Republican presidential candidate, as well as the last time that Kentucky has voted more Democratic than neighboring Tennessee.

== Results ==
1988 United States presidential election in Kentucky
Party	Candidate	Votes	Percentage	Electoral votes
Republican	George H. W. Bush	734,281	55.52%	9
Democratic	Michael Dukakis	580,368	43.88%	0
Populist	David Duke	4,494	0.34%	0
Libertarian	Ron Paul	2,118	0.16%	0
New Alliance	Lenora Fulani	1,256	0.09%	0
Totals		1,322,517	100.0%	9

=== Results by county ===
County	George H.W. Bush Republican		Michael Dukakis Democratic		David Duke Populist		Ron Paul Libertarian		Leonora Fulani New Alliance		Margin		Total votes cast
County	#	%	#	%	#	%	#	%	#	%	#	%	Total votes cast
Adair	4,346	71.09%	1,723	28.19%	24	0.39%	12	0.20%	8	0.13%	2,623	42.90%	6,113
Allen	3,342	67.89%	1,573	31.95%	4	0.08%	3	0.06%	1	0.02%	1,769	35.94%	4,923
Anderson	3,225	59.17%	2,176	39.93%	34	0.62%	8	0.15%	7	0.13%	1,049	19.24%	5,450
Ballard	1,460	40.23%	2,162	59.58%	5	0.14%	2	0.06%	0	0.00%	-702	-19.35%	3,629
Barren	6,653	57.82%	4,799	41.71%	24	0.21%	15	0.13%	15	0.13%	1,854	16.11%	11,506
Bath	1,614	43.34%	2,099	56.36%	8	0.21%	2	0.05%	1	0.03%	-485	-13.02%	3,724
Bell	5,759	51.45%	5,182	46.30%	223	1.99%	19	0.17%	10	0.09%	577	5.15%	11,193
Boone	12,667	69.76%	5,382	29.64%	24	0.13%	70	0.39%	14	0.08%	7,285	40.12%	18,157
Bourbon	3,308	53.57%	2,793	45.23%	55	0.89%	11	0.18%	8	0.13%	515	8.34%	6,175
Boyd	9,379	49.39%	9,552	50.31%	16	0.08%	22	0.12%	19	0.10%	-173	-0.92%	18,988
Boyle	4,746	56.81%	3,575	42.79%	15	0.18%	11	0.13%	7	0.08%	1,171	14.02%	8,354
Bracken	1,630	57.72%	1,176	41.64%	10	0.35%	5	0.18%	3	0.11%	454	16.08%	2,824
Breathitt	2,149	38.51%	3,387	60.70%	31	0.56%	7	0.13%	6	0.11%	-1,238	-22.19%	5,580
Breckinridge	3,841	57.99%	2,765	41.75%	8	0.12%	5	0.08%	4	0.06%	1,076	16.24%	6,623
Bullitt	8,859	59.01%	6,005	40.00%	97	0.65%	35	0.23%	17	0.11%	2,854	19.01%	15,013
Butler	3,278	72.22%	1,245	27.43%	9	0.20%	3	0.07%	4	0.09%	2,033	44.79%	4,539
Caldwell	2,952	52.93%	2,564	45.97%	54	0.97%	4	0.07%	3	0.05%	388	6.96%	5,577
Calloway	6,225	53.91%	5,287	45.79%	12	0.10%	14	0.12%	8	0.07%	938	8.12%	11,546
Campbell	19,387	66.61%	9,553	32.82%	52	0.18%	83	0.29%	29	0.10%	9,834	33.79%	29,104
Carlisle	1,104	43.06%	1,428	55.69%	25	0.98%	6	0.23%	1	0.04%	-324	-12.63%	2,564
Carroll	1,702	46.81%	1,913	52.61%	13	0.36%	5	0.14%	3	0.08%	-211	-5.80%	3,636
Carter	4,325	48.36%	4,570	51.10%	34	0.38%	8	0.09%	7	0.08%	-245	-2.74%	8,944
Casey	3,857	75.38%	1,216	23.76%	30	0.59%	9	0.18%	5	0.10%	2,641	51.62%	5,117
Christian	9,250	61.63%	5,704	38.01%	28	0.19%	14	0.09%	12	0.08%	3,546	23.62%	15,008
Clark	5,329	55.38%	4,252	44.19%	20	0.21%	9	0.09%	12	0.12%	1,077	11.19%	9,622
Clay	4,156	70.63%	1,709	29.04%	11	0.19%	7	0.12%	1	0.02%	2,447	41.59%	5,884
Clinton	3,248	77.80%	899	21.53%	9	0.22%	17	0.41%	2	0.05%	2,349	56.27%	4,175
Crittenden	2,211	60.31%	1,443	39.36%	7	0.19%	4	0.11%	1	0.03%	768	20.95%	3,666
Cumberland	2,231	74.49%	753	25.14%	6	0.20%	4	0.13%	1	0.03%	1,478	49.35%	2,995
Daviess	17,356	53.49%	14,815	45.66%	201	0.62%	47	0.14%	26	0.08%	2,541	7.83%	32,445
Edmonson	2,555	66.75%	1,243	32.47%	27	0.71%	2	0.05%	1	0.03%	1,312	34.28%	3,828
Elliott	550	23.33%	1,797	76.24%	5	0.21%	3	0.13%	2	0.08%	-1,247	-52.91%	2,357
Estill	3,077	64.18%	1,692	35.29%	11	0.23%	8	0.17%	6	0.13%	1,385	28.89%	4,794
Fayette	48,065	58.96%	32,554	39.93%	593	0.73%	192	0.24%	121	0.15%	15,511	19.03%	81,525
Fleming	2,409	53.27%	2,086	46.13%	11	0.24%	11	0.24%	5	0.11%	323	7.14%	4,522
Floyd	5,296	29.81%	12,327	69.39%	85	0.48%	29	0.16%	27	0.15%	-7,031	-39.58%	17,764
Franklin	9,805	50.88%	9,271	48.11%	136	0.71%	39	0.20%	20	0.10%	534	2.77%	19,271
Fulton	1,474	48.87%	1,531	50.76%	6	0.20%	2	0.07%	3	0.10%	-57	-1.89%	3,016
Gallatin	881	45.13%	1,060	54.30%	7	0.36%	4	0.20%	0	0.00%	-179	-9.17%	1,952
Garrard	2,681	60.18%	1,710	38.38%	53	1.19%	8	0.18%	3	0.07%	971	21.80%	4,455
Grant	2,835	59.05%	1,896	39.49%	51	1.06%	11	0.23%	8	0.17%	939	19.56%	4,801
Graves	6,274	46.32%	7,153	52.81%	84	0.62%	23	0.17%	11	0.08%	-879	-6.49%	13,545
Grayson	5,186	66.13%	2,575	32.84%	52	0.66%	16	0.20%	13	0.17%	2,611	33.29%	7,842
Green	3,139	66.07%	1,595	33.57%	9	0.19%	4	0.08%	4	0.08%	1,544	32.50%	4,751
Greenup	6,559	48.38%	6,956	51.31%	16	0.12%	19	0.14%	8	0.06%	-397	-2.93%	13,558
Hancock	1,733	53.44%	1,478	45.58%	27	0.83%	5	0.15%	0	0.00%	255	7.86%	3,243
Hardin	13,240	64.27%	7,262	35.25%	38	0.18%	34	0.17%	25	0.12%	5,978	29.02%	20,599
Harlan	5,166	41.08%	7,341	58.37%	43	0.34%	15	0.12%	11	0.09%	-2,175	-17.29%	12,576
Harrison	2,983	51.85%	2,748	47.77%	12	0.21%	7	0.12%	3	0.05%	235	4.08%	5,753
Hart	2,927	53.53%	2,519	46.07%	16	0.29%	4	0.07%	2	0.04%	408	7.46%	5,468
Henderson	6,911	47.27%	7,648	52.31%	27	0.18%	20	0.14%	14	0.10%	-737	-5.04%	14,620
Henry	2,286	46.98%	2,544	52.28%	16	0.33%	15	0.31%	5	0.10%	-258	-5.30%	4,866
Hickman	1,142	49.33%	1,158	50.02%	6	0.26%	8	0.35%	1	0.04%	-16	-0.69%	2,315
Hopkins	7,979	51.46%	7,453	48.07%	29	0.19%	25	0.16%	19	0.12%	526	3.39%	15,505
Jackson	3,926	85.16%	678	14.71%	1	0.02%	3	0.07%	2	0.04%	3,248	70.45%	4,610
Jefferson	139,711	52.01%	127,936	47.63%	322	0.12%	438	0.16%	232	0.09%	11,775	4.38%	268,639
Jessamine	7,057	69.76%	2,955	29.21%	82	0.81%	14	0.14%	8	0.08%	4,102	40.55%	10,116
Johnson	4,619	56.25%	3,538	43.09%	36	0.44%	5	0.06%	13	0.16%	1,081	13.16%	8,211
Kenton	30,738	67.12%	14,838	32.40%	65	0.14%	111	0.24%	41	0.09%	15,900	34.72%	45,793
Knott	1,691	24.42%	5,185	74.86%	30	0.43%	12	0.17%	8	0.12%	-3,494	-50.44%	6,926
Knox	4,903	62.21%	2,919	37.03%	45	0.57%	9	0.11%	6	0.08%	1,984	25.18%	7,882
LaRue	2,590	58.56%	1,822	41.19%	6	0.14%	5	0.11%	0	0.00%	768	17.37%	4,423
Laurel	9,296	71.54%	3,620	27.86%	53	0.41%	14	0.11%	11	0.08%	5,676	43.68%	12,994
Lawrence	2,294	50.89%	2,198	48.76%	9	0.20%	5	0.11%	2	0.04%	96	2.13%	4,508
Lee	1,588	61.31%	984	37.99%	9	0.35%	2	0.08%	7	0.27%	604	23.32%	2,590
Leslie	3,280	74.39%	1,105	25.06%	14	0.32%	8	0.18%	2	0.05%	2,175	49.33%	4,409
Letcher	3,601	43.16%	4,697	56.29%	22	0.26%	17	0.20%	7	0.08%	-1,096	-13.13%	8,344
Lewis	3,108	66.18%	1,568	33.39%	10	0.21%	5	0.11%	5	0.11%	1,540	32.79%	4,696
Lincoln	3,530	56.64%	2,677	42.96%	15	0.24%	5	0.08%	5	0.08%	853	13.68%	6,232
Livingston	1,834	46.92%	2,052	52.49%	15	0.38%	6	0.15%	2	0.05%	-218	-5.57%	3,909
Logan	4,295	55.74%	3,379	43.85%	17	0.22%	10	0.13%	4	0.05%	916	11.89%	7,705
Lyon	1,077	44.47%	1,337	55.20%	4	0.17%	3	0.12%	1	0.04%	-260	-10.73%	2,422
Madison	9,958	59.39%	6,672	39.79%	82	0.49%	36	0.21%	18	0.11%	3,286	19.60%	16,766
Magoffin	2,158	42.48%	2,895	56.99%	17	0.33%	2	0.04%	8	0.16%	-737	-14.51%	5,080
Marion	2,500	44.07%	3,152	55.56%	12	0.21%	3	0.05%	6	0.11%	-652	-11.49%	5,673
Marshall	5,256	47.05%	5,888	52.71%	14	0.13%	5	0.04%	8	0.07%	-632	-5.66%	11,171
Martin	2,587	61.65%	1,581	37.68%	15	0.36%	5	0.12%	8	0.19%	1,006	23.97%	4,196
Mason	3,158	53.57%	2,721	46.16%	8	0.14%	6	0.10%	2	0.03%	437	7.41%	5,895
McCracken	12,160	49.34%	12,208	49.54%	219	0.89%	39	0.16%	17	0.07%	-48	-0.20%	24,643
McCreary	3,477	66.96%	1,644	31.66%	53	1.02%	6	0.12%	13	0.25%	1,833	35.30%	5,193
McLean	1,829	44.49%	2,269	55.19%	3	0.07%	6	0.15%	4	0.10%	-440	-10.70%	4,111
Meade	3,441	52.57%	3,079	47.04%	11	0.17%	9	0.14%	5	0.08%	362	5.53%	6,545
Menifee	670	37.47%	1,096	61.30%	16	0.89%	2	0.11%	4	0.22%	-426	-23.83%	1,788
Mercer	3,904	57.05%	2,832	41.39%	90	1.32%	11	0.16%	6	0.09%	1,072	15.66%	6,843
Metcalfe	2,179	55.66%	1,705	43.55%	18	0.46%	9	0.23%	4	0.10%	474	12.11%	3,915
Monroe	4,214	80.02%	1,025	19.46%	15	0.28%	7	0.13%	5	0.09%	3,189	60.56%	5,266
Montgomery	3,435	52.55%	3,082	47.15%	11	0.17%	4	0.06%	5	0.08%	353	5.40%	6,537
Morgan	1,452	38.04%	2,329	61.02%	22	0.58%	6	0.16%	8	0.21%	-877	-22.98%	3,817
Muhlenberg	5,369	43.57%	6,912	56.09%	26	0.21%	11	0.09%	4	0.03%	-1,543	-12.52%	12,322
Nelson	5,283	51.90%	4,788	47.04%	82	0.81%	13	0.13%	13	0.13%	495	4.86%	10,179
Nicholas	1,271	49.67%	1,242	48.53%	37	1.45%	8	0.31%	1	0.04%	29	1.14%	2,559
Ohio	4,910	57.46%	3,612	42.27%	13	0.15%	7	0.08%	3	0.04%	1,298	15.19%	8,545
Oldham	8,716	68.14%	4,025	31.46%	17	0.13%	26	0.20%	8	0.06%	4,691	36.68%	12,792
Owen	1,468	44.34%	1,823	55.06%	9	0.27%	4	0.12%	7	0.21%	-355	-10.72%	3,311
Owsley	1,266	78.49%	345	21.39%	1	0.06%	1	0.06%	0	0.00%	921	57.10%	1,613
Pendleton	2,487	60.79%	1,576	38.52%	9	0.22%	14	0.34%	5	0.12%	911	22.27%	4,091
Perry	5,154	47.85%	5,557	51.59%	33	0.31%	14	0.13%	14	0.13%	-403	-3.74%	10,772
Pike	9,976	37.76%	16,339	61.85%	54	0.20%	32	0.12%	15	0.06%	-6,363	-24.09%	26,416
Powell	2,128	49.98%	2,113	49.62%	6	0.14%	4	0.09%	7	0.16%	15	0.36%	4,258
Pulaski	13,482	73.50%	4,788	26.10%	34	0.19%	23	0.13%	15	0.08%	8,694	47.40%	18,342
Robertson	511	49.37%	515	49.76%	1	0.10%	5	0.48%	3	0.29%	-4	-0.39%	1,035
Rockcastle	3,880	78.42%	1,041	21.04%	14	0.28%	10	0.20%	3	0.06%	2,839	57.38%	4,948
Rowan	3,093	50.90%	2,968	48.84%	9	0.15%	5	0.08%	2	0.03%	125	2.06%	6,077
Russell	4,292	74.29%	1,455	25.19%	14	0.24%	8	0.14%	8	0.14%	2,837	49.10%	5,777
Scott	4,482	56.68%	3,380	42.74%	22	0.28%	12	0.15%	12	0.15%	1,102	13.94%	7,908
Shelby	4,998	56.34%	3,834	43.22%	18	0.20%	8	0.09%	13	0.15%	1,164	13.12%	8,871
Simpson	2,699	55.55%	2,138	44.00%	13	0.27%	7	0.14%	2	0.04%	561	11.55%	4,859
Spencer	1,368	54.61%	1,121	44.75%	11	0.44%	4	0.16%	1	0.04%	247	9.86%	2,505
Taylor	5,362	64.76%	2,879	34.77%	18	0.22%	13	0.16%	8	0.10%	2,483	29.99%	8,280
Todd	2,282	57.66%	1,632	41.23%	34	0.86%	6	0.15%	4	0.10%	650	16.43%	3,958
Trigg	2,427	54.74%	1,991	44.90%	6	0.14%	5	0.11%	5	0.11%	436	9.84%	4,434
Trimble	1,083	44.39%	1,342	55.00%	4	0.16%	5	0.20%	6	0.25%	-259	-10.61%	2,440
Union	2,292	40.72%	3,316	58.92%	8	0.14%	2	0.04%	10	0.18%	-1,024	-18.20%	5,628
Warren	16,703	63.07%	9,684	36.57%	39	0.15%	36	0.14%	22	0.08%	7,019	26.50%	26,484
Washington	2,445	54.89%	1,950	43.78%	50	1.12%	3	0.07%	6	0.13%	495	11.11%	4,454
Wayne	3,672	63.89%	2,057	35.79%	8	0.14%	4	0.07%	6	0.10%	1,615	28.10%	5,747
Webster	2,159	41.50%	3,019	58.04%	13	0.25%	8	0.15%	3	0.06%	-860	-16.54%	5,202
Whitley	7,337	65.58%	3,794	33.91%	34	0.30%	15	0.13%	8	0.07%	3,543	31.67%	11,188
Wolfe	916	36.94%	1,516	61.13%	36	1.45%	9	0.36%	3	0.12%	-600	-24.19%	2,480
Woodford	4,512	62.63%	2,653	36.83%	11	0.15%	13	0.18%	15	0.21%	1,859	25.80%	7,204
Totals	734,281	55.52%	580,368	43.88%	4,494	0.34%	2,118	0.16%	1,256	0.09%	153,913	11.64%	1,322,517

==== Counties that flipped from Republican to Democratic ====
- Bath
- Boyd
- Carlisle
- Carroll
- Carter
- Fulton
- Gallatin (previously tied)
- Graves
- Greenup
- Henderson
- Henry
- Hickman
- Marion
- McCracken
- McLean
- Owen
- Robertson
- Trimble

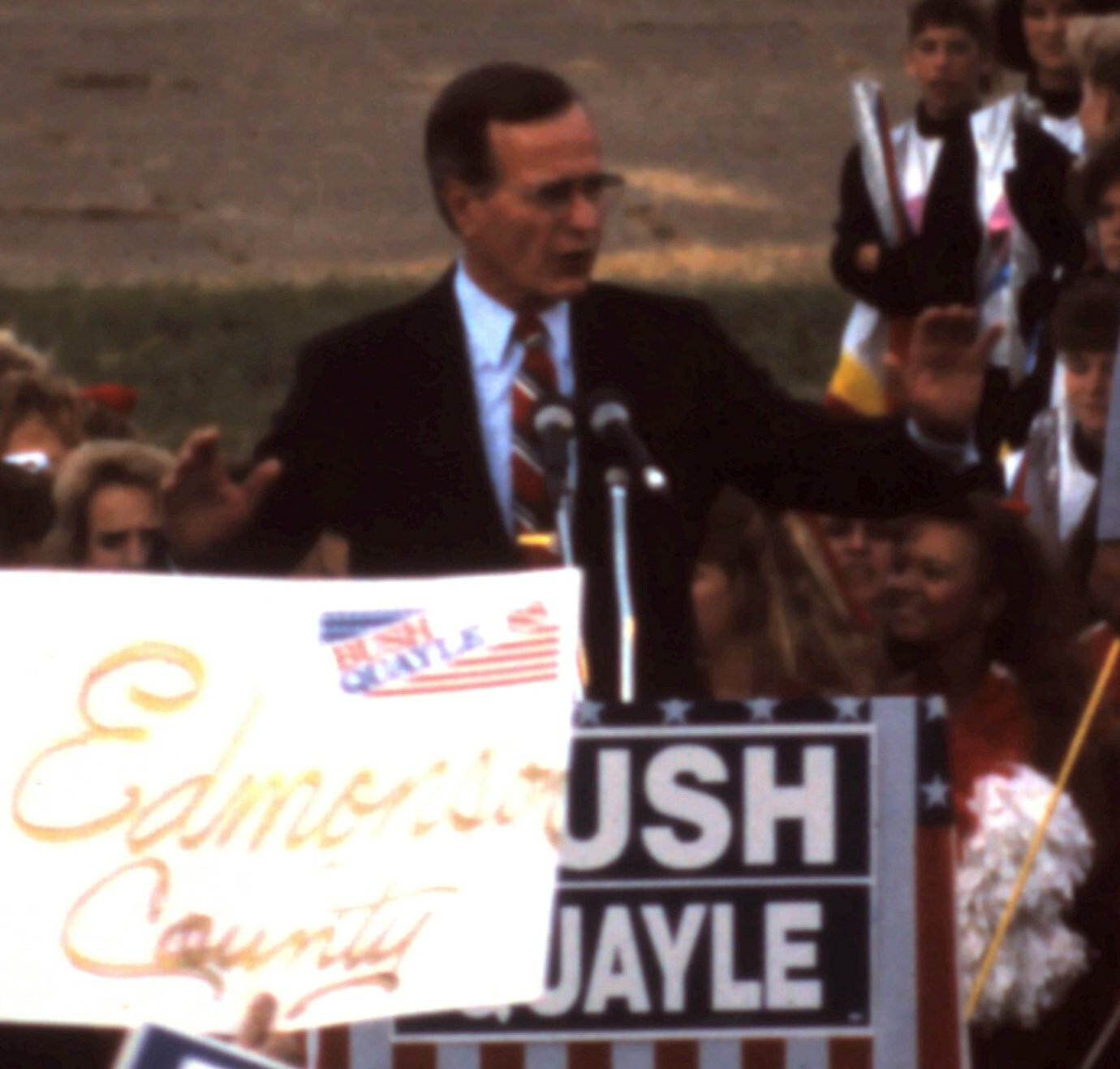
George H. W. Bush campaigning in Owensboro, Kentucky

== See also ==
- Presidency of George H. W. Bush
