= Milburn, Kentucky =

Unincorporated community in Kentucky, United States

- Unincorporated community
- Location within the state of Kentucky Milburn (the United States)
- Coordinates: 36°47′55″N 88°53′59″W
- Country: United States
- State: Kentucky
- County: Carlisle
- Elevation: 482 ft (147 m)
- Time zone: UTC-6 (Central (CST))
  - Summer (DST): UTC-5 (CST)
- ZIP code: 42070
- GNIS feature ID: 498175

Milburn is an unincorporated community in Carlisle County, Kentucky, United States. Its elevation is 482 feet (147 m), and it is located at 36°47′55″N 88°53′59″W (36.7986679, -88.8997817). Located along Kentucky Route 80 at its junction with Kentucky Routes 1371 and 1377, Milburn lies amid rolling countryside at the headwaters of Guess Creek, a tributary of Bayou du Chien; the nearest point on the Mississippi River is approximately 12 miles (19 km) to the west. Nearby cities include Arlington, 6 miles (9.7 km) by air to the west, and Bardwell, 8 miles (13 km) by air to the northwest; Milburn is connected to them by Kentucky Route 80 and Kentucky Route 1377 respectively. A state hunting preserve, the Obion Creek Wildlife Management Area, lies 2 miles (3.2 km) to the south. A fire station is located in Milburn, and a Creole cottage in the community, the George W. Stone House, is listed on the National Register of Historic Places.
