= Clyde Ehrhardt =

American football player (1921–1963)

No. 31
- Position: Center

Personal information
- Born: July 4, 1921; Bardwell, Kentucky, U.S.
- Died: February 5, 1963 (aged 41) near Clinton, South Carolina, U.S.
- Listed height: 6 ft 1 in (1.85 m)
- Listed weight: 232 lb (105 kg)

Career information
- High school: Morgan Prep (TN)
- College: Georgia
- NFL draft: 1944: 19th round, 193rd overall pick

Career history

Playing
- Washington Redskins (1946, 1948–1949)

Coaching
- Presbyterian (1957–1961) Assistant; Presbyterian (1962)

Career NFL statistics
- Games played: 34
- Games started: 8
- Interceptions: 3
- Fumble recoveries: 3
- Stats at Pro Football Reference

Clyde Walter Ehrhardt (July 4, 1921 – February 5, 1963) was an American professional football center in the National Football League (NFL) for the Washington Redskins. He played college football at the University of Georgia and was selected in the 19th round of the 1944 NFL draft. He served as the head football coach at Presbyterian College in 1962.

== Early life ==
Ehrhardt was born in Bardwell, Kentucky, and was the son of a Baptist minister who served pastorates in Kentucky and Tennessee. He attended Morgan Prep School in Petersburg, Tennessee.

== College career ==
Ehrhardt attended and played college football at the University of Georgia in Athens, Georgia. While at Georgia, he was part of the team that won the 1942 Orange Bowl, which was Georgia's first bowl appearance and first win. The following year, they won the 1943 Rose Bowl. Ehrhardt graduated from Georgia in 1943 and earned a master's degree from Peabody College in 1954.

== Military career ==
After graduating from college, Ehrhardt served in the United States Army as a company commander in Europe during World War II, during which he earned high decorations for valor and was twice seriously wounded. He then served on the staff of the Eighth United States Army during the Korean War as an intelligence officer.

== Professional football career ==
=== Player ===
Ehrhardt was selected in the 19th round of the 1944 NFL draft by the Washington Redskins, where he played in 1946, 1948 and 1949. In 34 games, he had three interceptions and three fumble recoveries.

=== Coach ===
After retiring from playing football, Ehrhardt became a football coach at Decatur High School in Decatur, Georgia, where he also taught math, physical education, and was the assistant principal. He became an assistant head coach in 1957 at Presbyterian College under head coach Frank Jones. In 1962, he succeeded Jones as head coach.

== Death ==
Ehrhardt died on February 5, 1963, from an accidental self-inflicted gunshot wound while on a hunting trip.

== Head coaching record ==
=== College ===
Year	Team	Overall	Conference	Standing	Bowl/playoffs
Presbyterian Blue Hose (South Carolina Little Three) (1962)
1962	Presbyterian	1–9	1–1	T–1st	
Presbyterian:		1–9	1–1		
Total:		1–9			
National championship Conference title Conference division title or championship game berth
