= 1920 United States presidential election in Kentucky =

- November 2, 1920

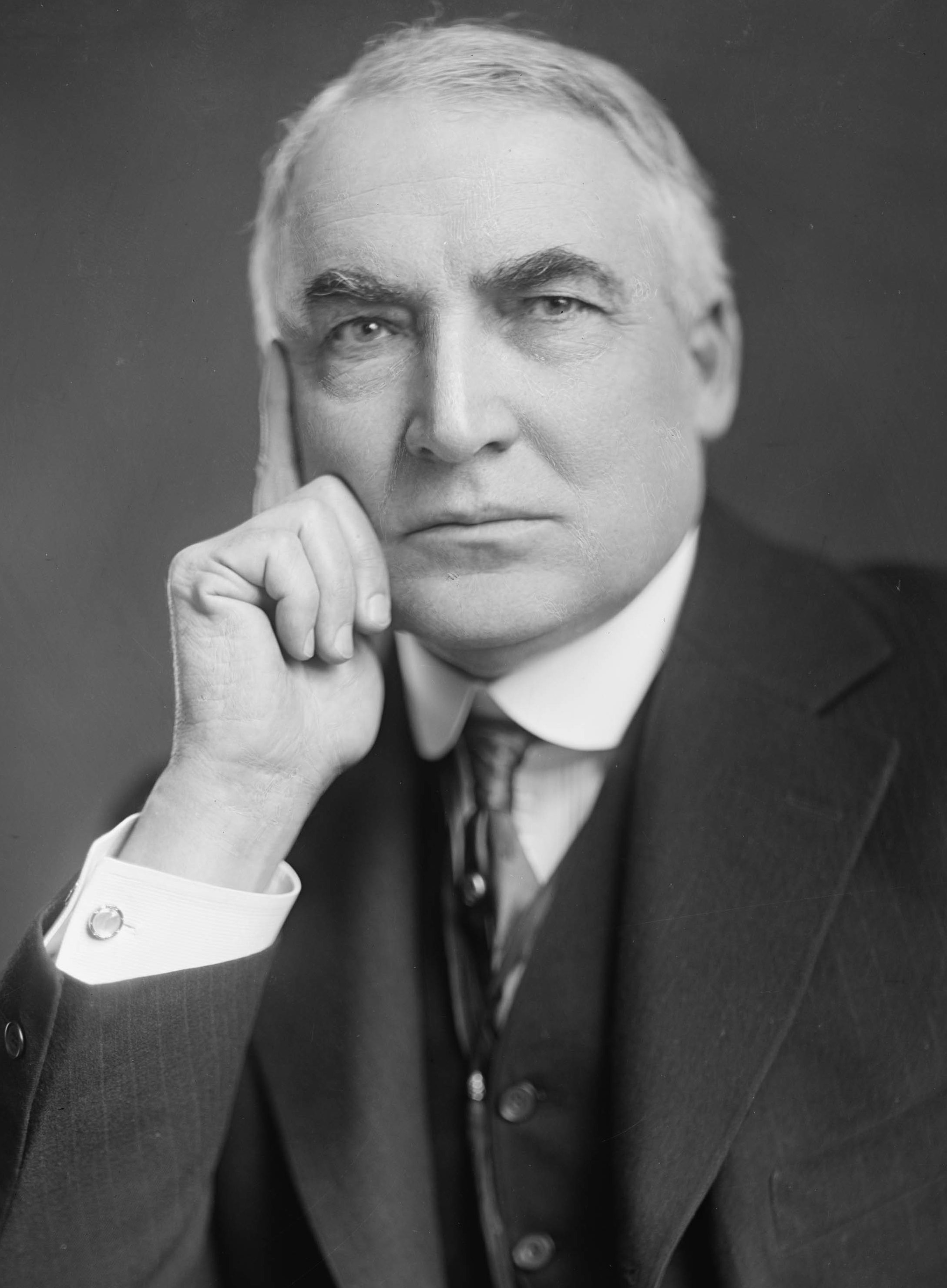
Nominee	James M. Cox	Warren G. Harding
Party	Democratic	Republican
Home state	Ohio	Ohio
Running mate	Franklin D. Roosevelt	Calvin Coolidge
Electoral vote	13	0
Popular vote	456,497	452,480
Percentage	49.69%	49.25%
County results
Cox
50–60%
60–70%
70–80%
80–90%
Harding
50–60%
60–70%
70–80%
80–90%
90–100%
President before election
Woodrow Wilson
Democratic
Elected President
Warren G. Harding
Republican

The 1920 United States presidential election in Kentucky took place on November 2, 1920, as part of the 1920 United States presidential election. Voters chose thirteen representatives, or electors to the Electoral College, who voted for president and vice president.

Ever since the Civil War, Kentucky had been shaped politically by divisions created by that war between secessionist, Democratic counties and Unionist, Republican ones, although the state as a whole leaned Democratic throughout this era and the GOP had carried the state only once – by a very narrow margin in 1896 when northern parts of the state were affected by hostility towards William Jennings Bryan, and state native John M. Palmer drew votes from the Democrats.

In 1919, however, Kentucky saw a significant change as the Republicans won not merely the governorship via Edwin P. Morrow but also control of the state legislature. However, there was a thought at the time that the triumph was partly a reflection of Morrow's own personal popularity.

The state legislature would ratify the Nineteenth Amendment on January 6, 1920, by more than three-to-one in both houses, and Kentucky would – alongside North Carolina which was abolishing its poll tax – observe the largest mobilization of new voters in the entire Union, and possibly the largest mobilization of female voters anywhere.

Despite the extreme hostility to outgoing President Wilson, Democratic nominee and Ohio Governor James M. Cox – who originated in Butler County, Ohio just across the state line – was supported powerfully by Fayette County political boss Billy Kair, and alongside the mobilization of female voters noted above, this caused Kentucky to lead the nation in turnout. With this high turnout and Kair's powerful support of Governor Cox, the Democrats were able to carry Kentucky by 0.44 percent or 4,017 votes, in spite of Cox losing Tennessee and all the other Border States to Ohio Senator and Republican nominee Warren G. Harding, who nationally won the largest popular-vote margin on record. Alongside North Carolina, Kentucky was the state which most resisted the Republican landslide, with Cox falling by only 3 percent from Woodrow Wilson’s 1916 vote share.

== Results ==
Presidential Candidate	Running Mate	Party	Electoral Vote (EV)	Popular Vote (PV)	
James M. Cox of Ohio	Franklin D. Roosevelt	Democratic	13	456,497	49.69%
Warren G. Harding	Calvin Coolidge	Republican	0	452,480	49.26%
Eugene V. Debs	Seymour Stedman	Socialist	0	6,409	0.70%
Aaron S. Watkins	D. Leigh Colvin	Prohibition	0	3,250	0.35%

=== Results by county ===
1920 United States presidential election in Kentucky by county
County	James Middleton Cox Democratic		Warren Gamaliel Harding Republican		Eugene Victor Debs Socialist		Aaron Sherman Watkins Prohibition		Margin		Total votes cast
County	#	%	#	%	#	%	#	%	#	%	Total votes cast
Adair	2,725	43.50%	3,526	56.28%	5	0.08%	9	0.14%	-801	-12.79%	6,265
Allen	2,255	39.08%	3,476	60.24%	6	0.10%	33	0.57%	-1,221	-21.16%	5,770
Anderson	2,499	57.71%	1,819	42.01%	0	0.00%	12	0.28%	680	15.70%	4,330
Ballard	3,987	76.48%	1,107	21.24%	105	2.01%	14	0.27%	2,880	55.25%	5,213
Barren	5,499	57.70%	3,972	41.67%	27	0.28%	33	0.35%	1,527	16.02%	9,531
Bath	2,440	54.72%	1,997	44.79%	6	0.13%	16	0.36%	443	9.93%	4,459
Bell	2,277	25.26%	6,691	74.23%	24	0.27%	22	0.24%	-4,414	-48.97%	9,014
Boone	3,472	77.50%	973	21.72%	11	0.25%	24	0.54%	2,499	55.78%	4,480
Bourbon	5,452	57.24%	4,029	42.30%	11	0.12%	32	0.34%	1,423	14.94%	9,524
Boyd	5,103	44.13%	6,334	54.78%	53	0.46%	73	0.63%	-1,231	-10.65%	11,563
Boyle	4,099	55.83%	3,205	43.65%	10	0.14%	28	0.38%	894	12.18%	7,342
Bracken	2,621	58.66%	1,791	40.09%	45	1.01%	11	0.25%	830	18.58%	4,468
Breathitt	2,737	52.31%	2,464	47.09%	9	0.17%	22	0.42%	273	5.22%	5,232
Breckinridge	3,702	45.71%	4,368	53.93%	10	0.12%	19	0.23%	-666	-8.22%	8,099
Bullitt	2,548	64.44%	1,393	35.23%	8	0.20%	5	0.13%	1,155	29.21%	3,954
Butler	1,356	24.81%	4,097	74.95%	4	0.07%	9	0.16%	-2,741	-50.15%	5,466
Caldwell	2,746	47.41%	2,958	51.07%	69	1.19%	19	0.33%	-212	-3.66%	5,792
Calloway	4,574	72.79%	1,520	24.19%	154	2.45%	36	0.57%	3,054	48.60%	6,284
Campbell	10,597	44.20%	12,210	50.93%	1,046	4.36%	123	0.51%	-1,613	-6.73%	23,976
Carlisle	2,688	78.09%	688	19.99%	38	1.10%	28	0.81%	2,000	58.11%	3,442
Carroll	3,209	77.49%	906	21.88%	4	0.10%	22	0.53%	2,303	55.61%	4,141
Carter	2,757	37.19%	4,595	61.98%	28	0.38%	34	0.46%	-1,838	-24.79%	7,414
Casey	1,951	35.26%	3,543	64.03%	9	0.16%	30	0.54%	-1,592	-28.77%	5,533
Christian	7,209	44.90%	8,743	54.45%	66	0.41%	39	0.24%	-1,534	-9.55%	16,057
Clark	4,846	60.67%	3,105	38.88%	13	0.16%	23	0.29%	1,741	21.80%	7,987
Clay	960	19.17%	4,015	80.17%	22	0.44%	11	0.22%	-3,055	-61.00%	5,008
Clinton	431	15.40%	2,356	84.20%	6	0.21%	5	0.18%	-1,925	-68.80%	2,798
Crittenden	2,138	40.26%	3,149	59.29%	9	0.17%	15	0.28%	-1,011	-19.04%	5,311
Cumberland	931	28.01%	2,380	71.60%	4	0.12%	9	0.27%	-1,449	-43.59%	3,324
Daviess	9,669	55.70%	7,584	43.69%	48	0.28%	58	0.33%	2,085	12.01%	17,359
Edmonson	1,171	33.13%	2,348	66.42%	4	0.11%	12	0.34%	-1,177	-33.30%	3,535
Elliott	1,764	66.89%	860	32.61%	0	0.00%	13	0.49%	904	34.28%	2,637
Estill	1,823	41.55%	2,552	58.17%	3	0.07%	9	0.21%	-729	-16.62%	4,387
Fayette	12,926	53.55%	11,032	45.70%	58	0.24%	123	0.51%	1,894	7.85%	24,139
Fleming	3,488	53.88%	2,960	45.72%	5	0.08%	21	0.32%	528	8.16%	6,474
Floyd	3,597	55.61%	2,825	43.68%	31	0.48%	15	0.23%	772	11.94%	6,468
Franklin	5,878	68.28%	2,710	31.48%	13	0.15%	8	0.09%	3,168	36.80%	8,609
Fulton	3,843	73.35%	1,365	26.05%	17	0.32%	14	0.27%	2,478	47.30%	5,239
Gallatin	1,782	76.58%	536	23.03%	4	0.17%	5	0.21%	1,246	53.55%	2,327
Garrard	2,434	44.51%	2,994	54.74%	6	0.11%	35	0.64%	-560	-10.24%	5,469
Grant	2,686	61.93%	1,613	37.19%	4	0.09%	34	0.78%	1,073	24.74%	4,337
Graves	9,018	72.14%	3,241	25.93%	216	1.73%	25	0.20%	5,777	46.22%	12,500
Grayson	2,830	40.15%	4,174	59.21%	10	0.14%	35	0.50%	-1,344	-19.07%	7,049
Green	1,723	42.54%	2,310	57.04%	8	0.20%	9	0.22%	-587	-14.49%	4,050
Greenup	2,754	46.18%	3,111	52.17%	67	1.12%	31	0.52%	-357	-5.99%	5,963
Hancock	1,384	48.07%	1,446	50.23%	35	1.22%	14	0.49%	-62	-2.15%	2,879
Hardin	5,382	61.28%	3,334	37.96%	30	0.34%	36	0.41%	2,048	23.32%	8,782
Harlan	1,805	19.30%	7,493	80.13%	31	0.33%	22	0.24%	-5,688	-60.83%	9,351
Harrison	4,804	66.36%	2,378	32.85%	10	0.14%	47	0.65%	2,426	33.51%	7,239
Hart	2,972	47.08%	3,264	51.70%	59	0.93%	18	0.29%	-292	-4.63%	6,313
Henderson	7,272	62.06%	4,161	35.51%	206	1.76%	79	0.67%	3,111	26.55%	11,718
Henry	4,640	67.28%	2,208	32.01%	10	0.14%	39	0.57%	2,432	35.26%	6,897
Hickman	3,045	77.40%	866	22.01%	17	0.43%	6	0.15%	2,179	55.39%	3,934
Hopkins	7,829	52.77%	6,732	45.38%	160	1.08%	115	0.78%	1,097	7.39%	14,836
Jackson	260	7.55%	3,174	92.16%	4	0.12%	6	0.17%	-2,914	-84.61%	3,444
Jefferson	56,046	44.64%	68,202	54.32%	1,119	0.89%	182	0.14%	-12,156	-9.68%	125,549
Jessamine	3,206	56.35%	2,349	41.29%	5	0.09%	129	2.27%	857	15.06%	5,689
Johnson	1,714	27.93%	4,373	71.26%	25	0.41%	25	0.41%	-2,659	-43.33%	6,137
Kenton	16,300	56.74%	11,411	39.72%	878	3.06%	141	0.49%	4,889	17.02%	28,730
Knott	2,295	73.84%	802	25.80%	2	0.06%	9	0.29%	1,493	48.04%	3,108
Knox	1,534	22.50%	5,228	76.68%	36	0.53%	20	0.29%	-3,694	-54.18%	6,818
Larue	2,361	56.07%	1,838	43.65%	4	0.09%	8	0.19%	523	12.42%	4,211
Laurel	1,621	27.43%	4,252	71.96%	16	0.27%	20	0.34%	-2,631	-44.53%	5,909
Lawrence	2,558	47.08%	2,849	52.44%	7	0.13%	19	0.35%	-291	-5.36%	5,433
Lee	1,246	39.99%	1,856	59.56%	7	0.22%	7	0.22%	-610	-19.58%	3,116
Leslie	142	5.19%	2,576	94.22%	13	0.48%	3	0.11%	-2,434	-89.03%	2,734
Letcher	1,960	31.11%	4,317	68.51%	10	0.16%	14	0.22%	-2,357	-37.41%	6,301
Lewis	1,550	26.60%	4,186	71.84%	50	0.86%	41	0.70%	-2,636	-45.24%	5,827
Lincoln	3,787	50.05%	3,710	49.04%	26	0.34%	43	0.57%	77	1.02%	7,566
Livingston	1,933	51.08%	1,790	47.30%	56	1.48%	5	0.13%	143	3.78%	3,784
Logan	6,111	60.36%	3,948	38.99%	35	0.35%	31	0.31%	2,163	21.36%	10,125
Lyon	1,968	59.96%	1,275	38.85%	23	0.70%	16	0.49%	693	21.12%	3,282
Madison	5,647	48.10%	6,012	51.21%	32	0.27%	48	0.41%	-365	-3.11%	11,739
Magoffin	1,352	36.39%	2,347	63.18%	7	0.19%	9	0.24%	-995	-26.78%	3,715
Marion	3,807	60.83%	2,431	38.85%	4	0.06%	16	0.26%	1,376	21.99%	6,258
Marshall	3,569	64.99%	1,883	34.29%	15	0.27%	25	0.46%	1,686	30.70%	5,492
Martin	330	15.89%	1,726	83.10%	8	0.39%	13	0.63%	-1,396	-67.21%	2,077
Mason	4,691	55.34%	3,743	44.16%	9	0.11%	33	0.39%	948	11.18%	8,476
McCracken	8,496	57.10%	6,085	40.89%	256	1.72%	43	0.29%	2,411	16.20%	14,880
McCreary	525	15.27%	2,889	84.01%	15	0.44%	10	0.29%	-2,364	-68.74%	3,439
McLean	2,754	52.75%	2,408	46.12%	50	0.96%	9	0.17%	346	6.63%	5,221
Meade	2,195	59.44%	1,468	39.75%	22	0.60%	8	0.22%	727	19.69%	3,693
Menifee	1,149	65.81%	581	33.28%	7	0.40%	9	0.52%	568	32.53%	1,746
Mercer	3,623	56.24%	2,786	43.25%	6	0.09%	27	0.42%	837	12.99%	6,442
Metcalfe	1,442	44.25%	1,809	55.51%	0	0.00%	8	0.25%	-367	-11.26%	3,259
Monroe	1,108	24.36%	3,426	75.31%	3	0.07%	12	0.26%	-2,318	-50.96%	4,549
Montgomery	3,069	58.35%	2,163	41.12%	9	0.17%	19	0.36%	906	17.22%	5,260
Morgan	3,347	64.79%	1,802	34.88%	4	0.08%	13	0.25%	1,545	29.91%	5,166
Muhlenberg	4,824	41.04%	6,667	56.73%	224	1.91%	38	0.32%	-1,843	-15.68%	11,753
Nelson	5,061	63.00%	2,945	36.66%	8	0.10%	19	0.24%	2,116	26.34%	8,033
Nicholas	2,953	65.71%	1,496	33.29%	11	0.24%	34	0.76%	1,457	32.42%	4,494
Ohio	4,011	41.91%	5,371	56.12%	144	1.50%	45	0.47%	-1,360	-14.21%	9,571
Oldham	2,655	72.07%	1,014	27.52%	5	0.14%	10	0.27%	1,641	44.54%	3,684
Owen	4,623	81.26%	1,049	18.44%	7	0.12%	10	0.18%	3,574	62.82%	5,689
Owsley	257	11.79%	1,914	87.80%	6	0.28%	3	0.14%	-1,657	-76.01%	2,180
Pendleton	2,598	54.67%	2,105	44.30%	10	0.21%	39	0.82%	493	10.37%	4,752
Perry	2,203	33.52%	4,345	66.10%	12	0.18%	13	0.20%	-2,142	-32.59%	6,573
Pike	5,619	41.25%	7,911	58.08%	32	0.23%	60	0.44%	-2,292	-16.83%	13,622
Powell	1,038	55.10%	835	44.32%	1	0.05%	10	0.53%	203	10.77%	1,884
Pulaski	3,749	33.90%	7,262	65.67%	18	0.16%	30	0.27%	-3,513	-31.77%	11,059
Robertson	940	59.87%	623	39.68%	0	0.00%	7	0.45%	317	20.19%	1,570
Rockcastle	1,438	28.66%	3,561	70.96%	7	0.14%	12	0.24%	-2,123	-42.31%	5,018
Rowan	1,264	44.40%	1,564	54.94%	13	0.46%	6	0.21%	-300	-10.54%	2,847
Russell	1,157	30.85%	2,587	68.97%	3	0.08%	4	0.11%	-1,430	-38.12%	3,751
Scott	4,993	65.02%	2,661	34.65%	10	0.13%	15	0.20%	2,332	30.37%	7,679
Shelby	5,446	61.34%	3,402	38.32%	12	0.14%	19	0.21%	2,044	23.02%	8,879
Simpson	3,206	65.34%	1,680	34.24%	5	0.10%	16	0.33%	1,526	31.10%	4,907
Spencer	2,135	65.63%	1,102	33.88%	5	0.15%	11	0.34%	1,033	31.76%	3,253
Taylor	2,380	48.59%	2,493	50.90%	6	0.12%	19	0.39%	-113	-2.31%	4,898
Todd	3,292	54.78%	2,663	44.31%	29	0.48%	26	0.43%	629	10.47%	6,010
Trigg	3,056	55.08%	2,420	43.62%	56	1.01%	16	0.29%	636	11.46%	5,548
Trimble	2,057	84.51%	361	14.83%	5	0.21%	11	0.45%	1,696	69.68%	2,434
Union	4,919	70.81%	1,943	27.97%	64	0.92%	21	0.30%	2,976	42.84%	6,947
Warren	7,010	55.64%	5,474	43.45%	34	0.27%	81	0.64%	1,536	12.19%	12,599
Washington	2,600	47.26%	2,892	52.56%	3	0.05%	7	0.13%	-292	-5.31%	5,502
Wayne	1,827	37.68%	2,992	61.70%	15	0.31%	15	0.31%	-1,165	-24.03%	4,849
Webster	4,831	57.41%	3,554	42.23%	12	0.14%	18	0.21%	1,277	15.18%	8,415
Whitley	1,556	17.64%	7,235	82.04%	20	0.23%	8	0.09%	-5,679	-64.40%	8,819
Wolfe	1,476	60.69%	939	38.61%	2	0.08%	15	0.62%	537	22.08%	2,432
Woodford	3,299	59.53%	2,218	40.02%	13	0.23%	12	0.22%	1,081	19.51%	5,542
Totals	456,497	49.69%	452,480	49.26%	6,409	0.70%	3,250	0.35%	4,017	0.44%	918,636
