= Neville-Patterson-Lamkin House =

- U.S. National Register of Historic Places
- Location within Kentucky Location within the United States
- Location: KY 80, Arlington, Kentucky
- Coordinates: 36°47′21″N 89°00′40″W
- Area: 5 acres (2.0 ha)
- Built: c.1873
- NRHP reference No.: 76000859
- Added to NRHP: June 16, 1976

The Neville-Patterson-Lamkin House, on Kentucky Route 80 in Arlington, Kentucky, was listed on the National Register of Historic Places in 1976.

It is a two-story five-bay brick house built around 1873, with a rear one-story ell extending east. Its brick is laid in common bond. A Victorian-style porch was removed and replaced by another porch.
