= George W. Stone House =

- U.S. National Register of Historic Places
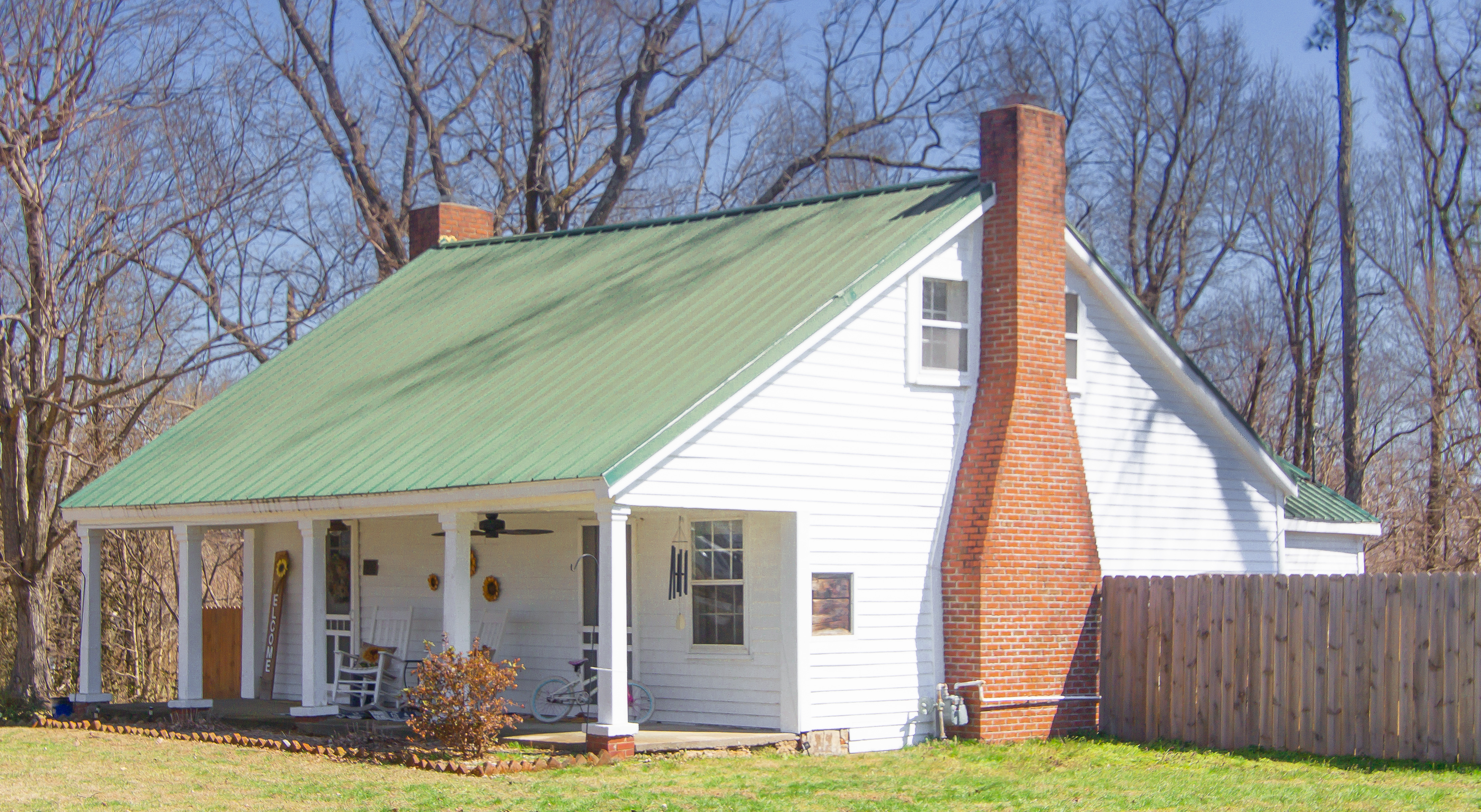

- Location within Kentucky Location within the United States
- Location: 7100 KY 80, Millburn, Kentucky
- Coordinates: 36°47′57″N 88°53′48″W
- Area: less than one acre
- Built: c.1858
- Architectural style: Creole Cottage
- NRHP reference No.: 94000223
- Added to NRHP: March 17, 1994

The George W. Stone House, located on Kentucky Route 80 in or near Millburn in Carlisle County, Kentucky, was built around 1858. It was listed on the National Register of Historic Places in 1994.

It has Creole Cottage architecture

It is a one-and-a-half-story log house.

It has a long ell behind the house, probably begun as a kitchen.
