= Jackson Purchase =

Region in Kentucky

Coordinates: 36.86°N 88.76°W

- Territorial acquisition
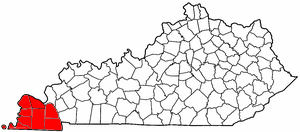
- Counties comprising the Jackson Purchase region
- Area
- Area transferred
  - 1818: Western Kentucky, West Tennessee, from The Chickasaw Nation
  - 2020: 6,202.5 km^{2} (2,394.8 sq mi)
- Population
  - 2020: 196,876
- Status: Former disputed territory
- Government
  - Type: Federal & State
- U.S. negotiator
  - 1818: General Andrew Jackson
- U.S. negotiator
  - 1818: Ex-governor Isaac Shelby
- Historical era: Westward expansion of the U.S.
  - Claimed by U.S.: 1792
  - U.S. acquired in Treaty of Tuscaloosa: October, 1818
  - Annexed to Kentucky & Tennessee: 1819
- Subdivisions
  - Type: Counties
  - Units: Ballard; Calloway; Carlisle; Fulton; Graves; Hickman; Marshall; McCracken
- Today part of: Western Kentucky & West Tennessee

The Jackson Purchase, also known as the Purchase Region or simply the Purchase, is a region in the U.S. state of Kentucky bounded by the Mississippi River to the west, the Ohio River to the north, and the Tennessee River to the east.

== History ==
=== Origin ===
The land was ceded after prolonged negotiations with the Chickasaw Indians in which the United States was represented by Andrew Jackson and Isaac Shelby, while the Chickasaws were represented by their chiefs, head men, and warriors including: Levi Colbert, his brother George Colbert, Chinubby, and Tishomingo. On October 19, 1818, the two sides agreed to the transfer by signing the Treaty of Tuscaloosa. The United States agreed to pay the Chickasaw people $300,000, at the rate of $20,000 annually for 15 years, in return for the right to all Chickasaw land east of the Mississippi River and north of the new state of Mississippi border.

=== After statehood ===
Although claimed as part of Kentucky at its statehood in 1792, the land did not come under definitive U.S. control until 1818, when General Andrew Jackson and ex-Kentucky governor Isaac Shelby, representing the United States federal government, purchased it from the Chickasaw nation through several treaties, including the Treaty of Tuscaloosa.

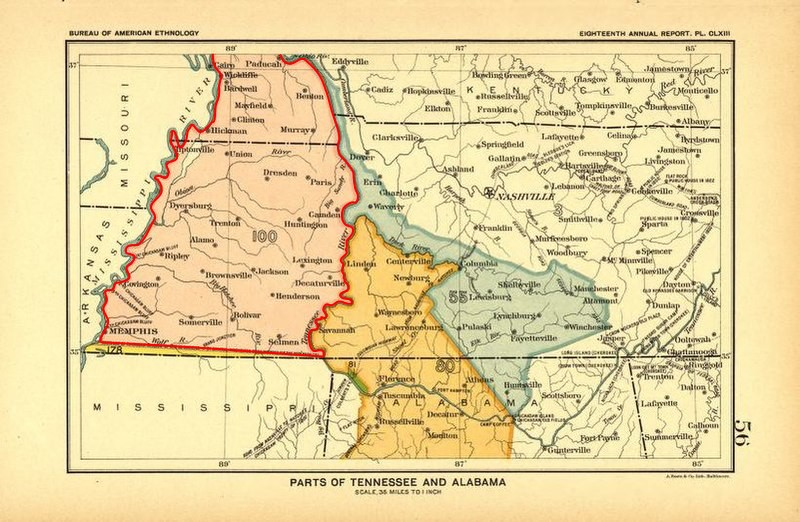
The Western Tennessee land acquisitions under President James Monroe between the Chickasaw and the U. S. affecting the states of Kentucky and Tennessee, and the Alabama Territory: *Pink with red outline – Treaty of Tuscaloosa (1818) *Yellow – Treaty with Chickasaw (1817) *Gray – Treaty with Chickasaw (1805)

Historically, this region has been considered the most culturally "Southern" of Kentucky: it had an agricultural economy tied to cotton plantations and the use of enslaved labor before the Civil War and was settled by people from Eastern and Central Kentucky, as well as backcountry areas of Tennessee, Virginia, Georgia, and the Carolinas. The Purchase in the years after the war voted as the most staunchly Democratic region in Kentucky, owing to heavily pro-Confederate sentiment in the region. For well over a century, it provided such overwhelming margins for Democratic candidates that Kentucky Democrats routinely called it the "Gibraltar of Democracy." The most widely circulated newspaper and media outlet in the Purchase, The Paducah Sun, was once named the Paducah Sun-Democrat (see WPSD-TV). Due to changing demographics, most counties in the Purchase in the early 21st century have populations that are overwhelmingly white. Many African Americans left the area after the Civil War and during the Great Migration of the 20th century, many of them migrating to cities in the Midwest and West for industrial jobs.

During the Civil War, the Purchase was the area of strongest support for the Confederate cause within Kentucky. On May 29, 1861, a group of Southern sympathizers from Kentucky and Tennessee met at the Graves County Courthouse in Mayfield to discuss the possibility of aligning the Purchase with West Tennessee. Most records of the event were lost, possibly in an 1864 fire that destroyed the courthouse. After the War the region heightened its sense of being "Southern."

In 1907, Fulton County judge Herbert Carr declared in a speech that the Mayfield Convention adopted a resolution for secession, and a historical marker in front of the courthouse also proclaims this as fact. But, the surviving records of the meeting, authored by a Union sympathizer, make no mention of this resolution. Historian Berry Craig states that the convention believed the whole of Kentucky would eventually secede and make unnecessary a separate resolution for the Purchase to break away.

Records do show that the convention adopted resolutions condemning President Abraham Lincoln for "waging a bloody and cruel war" against the South, urging Governor Beriah Magoffin to resist Union forces and praising him for refusing to answer Lincoln's call for soldiers, and condemning the provision of "Lincoln guns" to Union sympathizers in Kentucky. The convention nominated Henry Burnett to represent Kentucky's First District in Congress. The Mayfield Convention was a precursor to the later Russellville Convention, that formed the provisional Confederate government of Kentucky.

Kentucky congressional districts as of 2023

Since the late 20th century, the Purchase has voted for Republicans in national elections while giving higher percentages to candidates of the Democratic Party in state and local elections. This trend is similar to realignment among white conservatives in other parts of the South. As of 2004, however, the region's delegation in the Kentucky General Assembly included both Republican Party and Democratic Party representatives. For the first time in history, the region elected Republicans for both of its two state senators. The Jackson Purchase is within Kentucky's 1st congressional district.

== Geography ==
The Purchase comprised what is now eight counties, with a combined land area of 3,394.8 square miles (6,202.5 km^{2}), about 6.03% of Kentucky's land area. Its 2010 census population was 196,365 inhabitants, equal to 4.53% of the state's population. Paducah, the largest city and main economic center, has just over 25,000 residents. The region's other two largest cities, Murray and Mayfield, have about 18,000 and 10,000 residents respectively. The main educational institution is Murray State University.

=== Counties ===
- Ballard County
- Calloway County
- Carlisle County
- Fulton County
- Graves County
- Hickman County
- Marshall County
- McCracken County

=== Largest municipalities ===
County seat†

Rank	Name	Population	Area	County	Inc.
1	Paducah†	27,137	20.75 mi^{2} (53.74 km^{2})	McCracken	1838
2	Murray†	17,307	11.68 mi^{2} (30.25 km^{2})	Calloway	January 17, 1844
3	Mayfield†	10,017	7.38 mi^{2} (19.11 km^{2})	Graves	1846
4	Benton†	4,756	5.10 mi^{2} (13.21 km^{2})	Marshall	1845
5	Calvert City	2,514	18.51 mi^{2} (47.94 km^{2})	Marshall	March 18, 1871
6	Hickman†	2,365	3.58 mi^{2} (9.27 km^{2})	Fulton	February 18, 1841
7	Fulton	2,357	2.98 mi^{2} (7.72 km^{2})	Fulton	1872
8	Clinton	1,222	1.62 mi^{2} (4.20 km^{2})	Hickman	1831
9	LaCenter	872	0.60 mi^{2} (1.55 km^{2})	Ballard	
10	Bardwell†	714	0.87 mi^{2} (2.25 km^{2})	Carlisle	1878

== Economy ==
Though chiefly an agricultural economy, tourism is an important industry in the Purchase, focused chiefly on water-related activities at the TVA-created Kentucky Lake. Together with the portion of the Tennessee River north of Kentucky Dam, it forms the eastern border of the Purchase.

=== Notable people ===
Notable people from the region include:

- Alben W. Barkley, Vice President of the United States, 1949–1953
- Julian Carroll, 54th Governor of Kentucky, 1974–1979
- Steven Curtis Chapman, Christian music artist
- Irvin Cobb, humorist and author
- Jackie DeShannon, singer/songwriter
- Steve Finley, major league baseball player, 1989–2007
- Joe Fulks, basketball player
- Robert H. Grubbs, Nobel Prize winner in Chemistry, 2005
- Lloyd Tilghman, Confederate general
- Harry Lee Waterfield, lieutenant governor of Kentucky, 1955–1959 and 1963–1967
