= Arlington, Kentucky =

- City
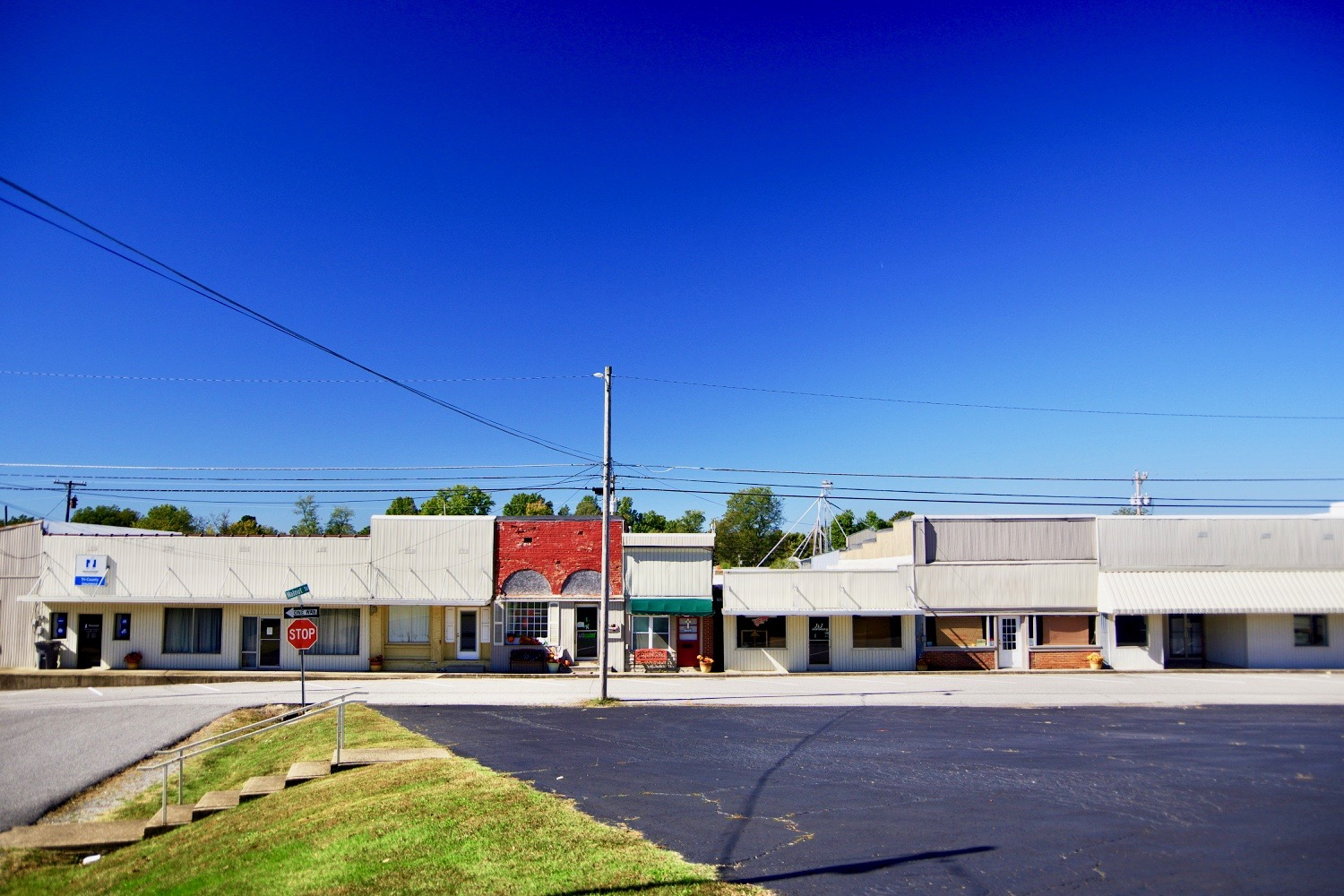
- Walnut Street

- Location of Arlington in Carlisle County, Kentucky.
- Coordinates: 36°47′29″N 89°0′41″W
- Country: United States
- State: Kentucky
- County: Carlisle

Area
  - Total: 0.37 sq mi (0.97 km^{2})
  - Land: 0.37 sq mi (0.97 km^{2})
  - Water: 0 sq mi (0.00 km^{2})
- Elevation: 351 ft (107 m)

Population (2020)
  - Total: 264
  - Density: 701.7/sq mi (270.93/km^{2})
- Time zone: UTC-6 (Central (CST))
  - Summer (DST): UTC-5 (CDT)
- ZIP code: 42021
- Area codes: 270 & 364
- FIPS code: 21-02044
- GNIS feature ID: 0486029

Arlington is a home rule-class city in Carlisle County, Kentucky, in the United States. As of the 2020 census, Arlington had a population of 264. It was formally incorporated by the state assembly in 1876. Arlington is included in the Paducah, KY-IL Metropolitan Statistical Area.

== History ==
Arlington was founded in 1873 as a stop along a predecessor line of the Illinois Central Railroad. The new city was initially known as "Neville" after Robert Buckner Neville, who owned the land on which it was established. Several developers wanted to rename the city "Holtsville" after local store owner Tom Holt. To prevent a dispute, the railroad settled on the name "Arlington" after Arlington Heights, Virginia, the hometown of a railroad official. The new city was incorporated in 1876.

When Carlisle County was created in 1886, Arlington was initially selected as the seat of the new county. The nearby city of Bardwell challenged this, however, noting its more central location within the county. County officials agreed, and moved the seat to Bardwell shortly afterward.

== Geography ==
Arlington is located in southern Carlisle County at 36°47′29″N 89°00′41″W. U.S. Route 51 and Kentucky Route 80 intersect in the city. US 51 leads north 6 miles (10 km) to Bardwell, Kentucky, and 21 miles (34 km) to Cairo, Illinois, while leading south 23 miles (37 km) to Fulton on the Tennessee line. KY 80 leads west 6 miles (10 km) to Columbus on the Mississippi River and east 23 miles (37 km) to Mayfield.

According to the United States Census Bureau, Arlington has a total area of 0.4 square miles (1.0 km^{2}), all of it land.

== Demographics ==
Historical population
Census	Pop.	Note	%±
1880	337		—
1890	574		70.3%
1900	584		1.7%
1910	555		−5.0%
1920	668		20.4%
1930	685		2.5%
1940	690		0.7%
1950	584		−15.4%
1960	584		0.0%
1970	549		−6.0%
1980	511		−6.9%
1990	449		−12.1%
2000	395		−12.0%
2010	324		−18.0%
2020	264		−18.5%
U.S. Decennial Census

As of the census of 2000, there were 395 people, 189 households, and 109 families residing in the city. The population density was 989.1 inhabitants per square mile (381.9/km^{2}). There were 213 housing units at an average density of 533.4 per square mile (205.9/km^{2}). The racial makeup of the city was 95.19% White, 4.56% African American, and 0.25% from two or more races. Hispanic or Latino of any race were 1.01% of the population.

There were 189 households, out of which 22.8% had children under the age of 18 living with them, 40.2% were married couples living together, 12.7% had a female householder with no husband present, and 42.3% were non-families. 39.2% of all households were made up of individuals, and 23.8% had someone living alone who was 65 years of age or older. The average household size was 2.09 and the average family size was 2.77.

In the city, the population was spread out, with 21.0% under the age of 18, 6.1% from 18 to 24, 21.0% from 25 to 44, 27.3% from 45 to 64, and 24.6% who were 65 years of age or older. The median age was 46 years. For every 100 females, there were 82.0 males. For every 100 females age 18 and over, there were 77.3 males.

The median income for a household in the city was $17,813, and the median income for a family was $28,750. Males had a median income of $17,396 versus $15,833 for females. The per capita income for the city was $13,561. About 24.1% of families and 29.3% of the population were below the poverty line, including 41.5% of those under age 18 and 33.7% of those age 65 or over.

== Economy ==
In February 2026, Chris Negus, CEO of Global NRG, and the co-developer of Green Energy Parks announced a new $142 million agricultural waste-to-energy facility in Arlington, that will create 20 high-wage positions. The facility will convert locally sourced agricultural byproducts into clean renewable natural gas, and food-grade liquid carbon dioxide (CO₂).

== Notable residents ==
- George Harper, former Major League Baseball player who played for six teams
