= Carlisle County, Kentucky =

County in Kentucky, United States

- County
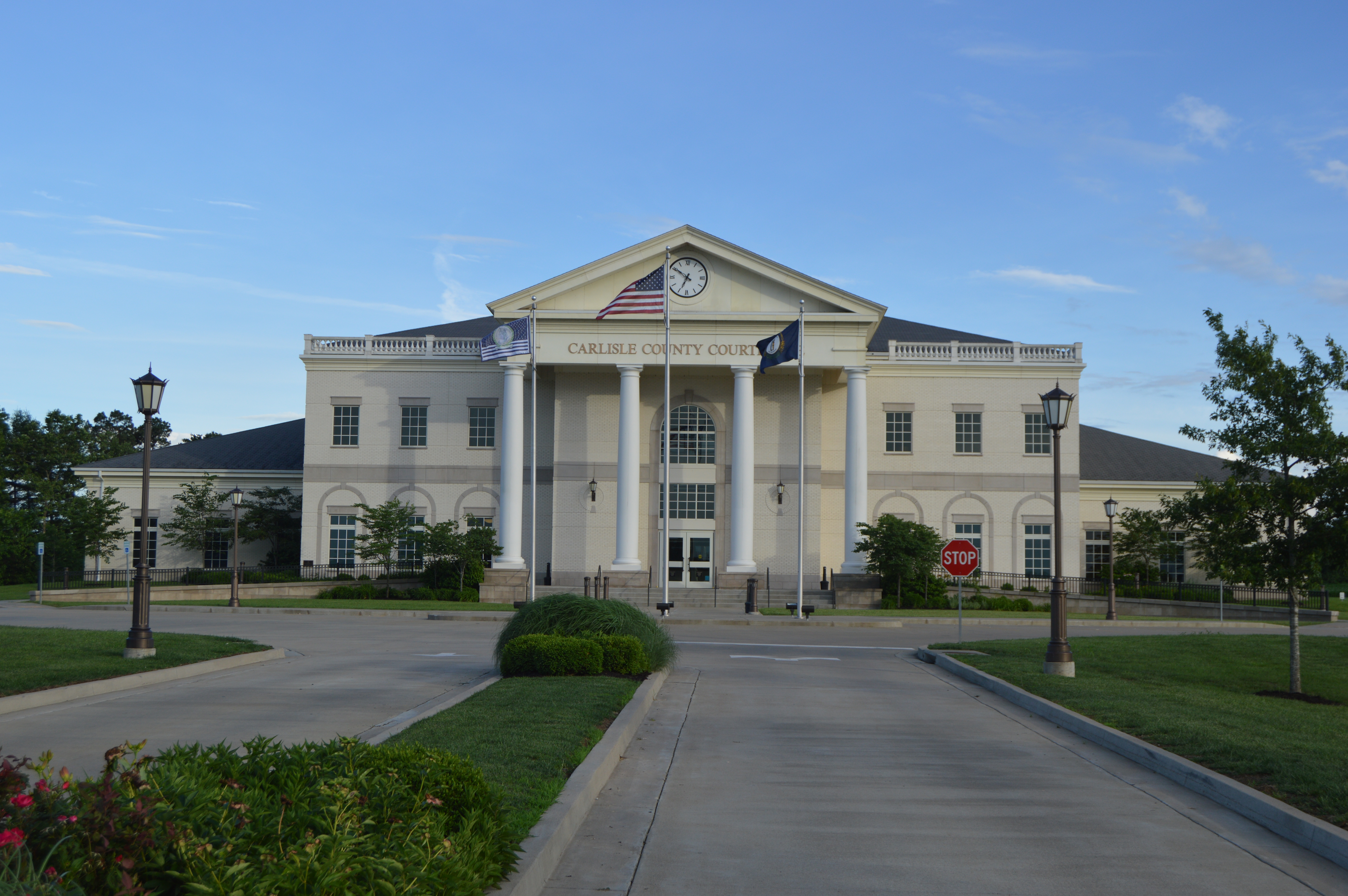
- Carlisle County Courthouse

- Location within the U.S. state of Kentucky
- Coordinates: 36°51′N 88°59′W
- Country: United States
- State: Kentucky
- Founded: 1886
- Named for: John G. Carlisle
- Seat: Bardwell
- Largest city: Bardwell

Government
  - Judge/Executive: Greg Terry (D)

Area
  - Total: 199 sq mi (520 km^{2})
  - Land: 189 sq mi (490 km^{2})
  - Water: 9.5 sq mi (25 km^{2}) 4.8%

Population (2020)
  - Total: 4,826
  - Estimate (2025): 4,747 ▼
  - Density: 25.5/sq mi (9.86/km^{2})
- Time zone: UTC−6 (Central)
  - Summer (DST): UTC−5 (CDT)
- Congressional district: 1st
- Website: www.carlislecountyky.com

Carlisle County is a county located in the U.S. state of Kentucky. As of the 2020 census, the population was 4,826, making it the fourth-least populous county in Kentucky. Its county seat is Bardwell. The county was founded in 1886 and named for John Griffin Carlisle, a Speaker of the United States House of Representatives from Kentucky. It remains a prohibition or dry county. Carlisle County is included in the Paducah, KY-IL, Metropolitan Statistical Area.

== Geography ==
According to the U.S. Census Bureau, the county has a total area of 199 square miles (520 km^{2}), of which 189 square miles (490 km^{2}) is land and 9.5 square miles (25 km^{2}) (4.8%) is water. The county's western border with Missouri is formed by the Mississippi River.

=== Adjacent counties ===
- Ballard County (north)
- McCracken County (northeast)
- Graves County (east)
- Hickman County (south)
- Mississippi County, Missouri (west)

== Demographics ==
Historical population
Census	Pop.	Note	%±
1890	7,612		—
1900	10,195		33.9%
1910	9,048		−11.3%
1920	8,231		−9.0%
1930	7,363		−10.5%
1940	7,650		3.9%
1950	6,206		−18.9%
1960	5,608		−9.6%
1970	5,354		−4.5%
1980	5,487		2.5%
1990	5,238		−4.5%
2000	5,351		2.2%
2010	5,104		−4.6%
2020	4,826		−5.4%
2025 (est.)	4,747	▼	−1.6%
U.S. Decennial Census; 1790-1960 1900-1990; 1990-2000 2020-2021

=== 2020 census ===
As of the 2020 census, the county had a population of 4,826. The median age was 43.7 years. 22.9% of residents were under the age of 18 and 21.5% of residents were 65 years of age or older. For every 100 females there were 100.9 males, and for every 100 females age 18 and over there were 100.0 males age 18 and over.

The racial makeup of the county was 93.9% White, 1.3% Black or African American, 0.6% American Indian and Alaska Native, 0.2% Asian, 0.0% Native Hawaiian and Pacific Islander, 0.2% from some other race, and 3.8% from two or more races. Hispanic or Latino residents of any race comprised 2.8% of the population.

0.0% of residents lived in urban areas, while 100.0% lived in rural areas.

There were 2,003 households in the county, of which 29.6% had children under the age of 18 living with them and 22.7% had a female householder with no spouse or partner present. About 29.0% of all households were made up of individuals and 14.8% had someone living alone who was 65 years of age or older.

There were 2,293 housing units, of which 12.6% were vacant. Among occupied housing units, 78.8% were owner-occupied and 21.2% were renter-occupied. The homeowner vacancy rate was 2.0% and the rental vacancy rate was 5.9%.

=== 2000 census ===
As of the census of 2000, there were 5,351 people, 2,208 households, and 1,574 families residing in the county. The population density was 28 per square mile (11/km^{2}). There were 2,490 housing units at an average density of 13 per square mile (5.0/km^{2}). The racial makeup of the county was 97.78% White, 0.95% Black or African American, 0.41% Native American, 0.07% Asian, 0.22% from other races, and 0.56% from two or more races. 0.82% of the population were Hispanic or Latino of any race.

There were 2,208 households, out of which 30.60% had children under the age of 18 living with them, 58.50% were married couples living together, 9.30% had a female householder with no husband present, and 28.70% were non-families. 26.30% of all households were made up of individuals, and 13.10% had someone living alone who was 65 years of age or older. The average household size was 2.40 and the average family size was 2.88.

In the county, the population was spread out, with 23.40% under the age of 18, 7.80% from 18 to 24, 26.40% from 25 to 44, 24.10% from 45 to 64, and 18.30% who were 65 years of age or older. The median age was 40 years. For every 100 females there were 95.20 males. For every 100 females age 18 and over, there were 92.90 males.

The median income for a household in the county was $30,087, and the median income for a family was $33,433. Males had a median income of $29,523 versus $19,792 for females. The per capita income for the county was $16,276. About 10.50% of families and 13.10% of the population were below the poverty line, including 17.40% of those under age 18 and 11.00% of those age 65 or over.

== Economy ==
In February 2026, Chris Negus, CEO of Global NRG, and the co-developer of Green Energy Parks announced a new $142 million agricultural waste-to-energy facility in Arlington, that will create 20 high-wage positions. The facility will convert locally sourced agricultural byproducts into clean renewable natural gas, and food-grade liquid carbon dioxide (CO₂).

== Politics ==
United States presidential election results for Carlisle County, Kentucky
Year	Republican		Democratic		Third party(ies)	
Year	No.	%	No.	%	No.	%
1888	271	23.65%	848	74.00%	27	2.36%
1892	223	15.73%	811	57.19%	384	27.08%
1896	390	18.68%	1,624	77.78%	74	3.54%
1900	533	24.58%	1,587	73.20%	48	2.21%
1904	468	23.16%	1,428	70.66%	125	6.19%
1908	482	22.07%	1,625	74.40%	77	3.53%
1912	331	17.04%	1,409	72.55%	202	10.40%
1916	494	22.61%	1,646	75.33%	45	2.06%
1920	688	19.99%	2,688	78.09%	66	1.92%
1924	467	16.93%	2,250	81.58%	41	1.49%
1928	787	28.28%	1,994	71.65%	2	0.07%
1932	402	12.36%	2,840	87.30%	11	0.34%
1936	420	16.15%	2,150	82.69%	30	1.15%
1940	500	17.37%	2,366	82.21%	12	0.42%
1944	505	19.67%	2,057	80.10%	6	0.23%
1948	279	12.57%	1,899	85.54%	42	1.89%
1952	656	25.99%	1,867	73.97%	1	0.04%
1956	608	22.72%	2,063	77.09%	5	0.19%
1960	978	35.59%	1,770	64.41%	0	0.00%
1964	282	15.22%	1,565	84.46%	6	0.32%
1968	479	19.65%	1,144	46.92%	815	33.43%
1972	1,169	55.75%	872	41.58%	56	2.67%
1976	435	17.71%	1,985	80.82%	36	1.47%
1980	975	38.31%	1,542	60.59%	28	1.10%
1984	1,308	50.15%	1,277	48.96%	23	0.88%
1988	1,104	43.06%	1,428	55.69%	32	1.25%
1992	844	33.16%	1,383	54.34%	318	12.50%
1996	816	33.62%	1,355	55.83%	256	10.55%
2000	1,405	54.18%	1,149	44.31%	39	1.50%
2004	1,734	60.95%	1,102	38.73%	9	0.32%
2008	1,699	64.92%	879	33.59%	39	1.49%
2012	1,835	70.06%	750	28.64%	34	1.30%
2016	2,094	80.51%	432	16.61%	75	2.88%
2020	2,159	81.84%	463	17.55%	16	0.61%
2024	2,182	83.60%	408	15.63%	20	0.77%

=== Elected officials ===
Elected officials as of January 3, 2025
U.S. House	James Comer (R)	KY 1
Ky. Senate	Danny Carroll (R)	2
Ky. House	Steven Rudy (R)	1

== Communities ==
=== Cities ===
- Arlington
- Bardwell

=== Census-designated place ===
- Cunningham

=== Unincorporated communities ===
- Geveden
- Milburn
- Yellow Dog Road

== See also ==
- National Register of Historic Places listings in Carlisle County, Kentucky
- List of counties in Kentucky
