= Bardwell, Kentucky =

- City
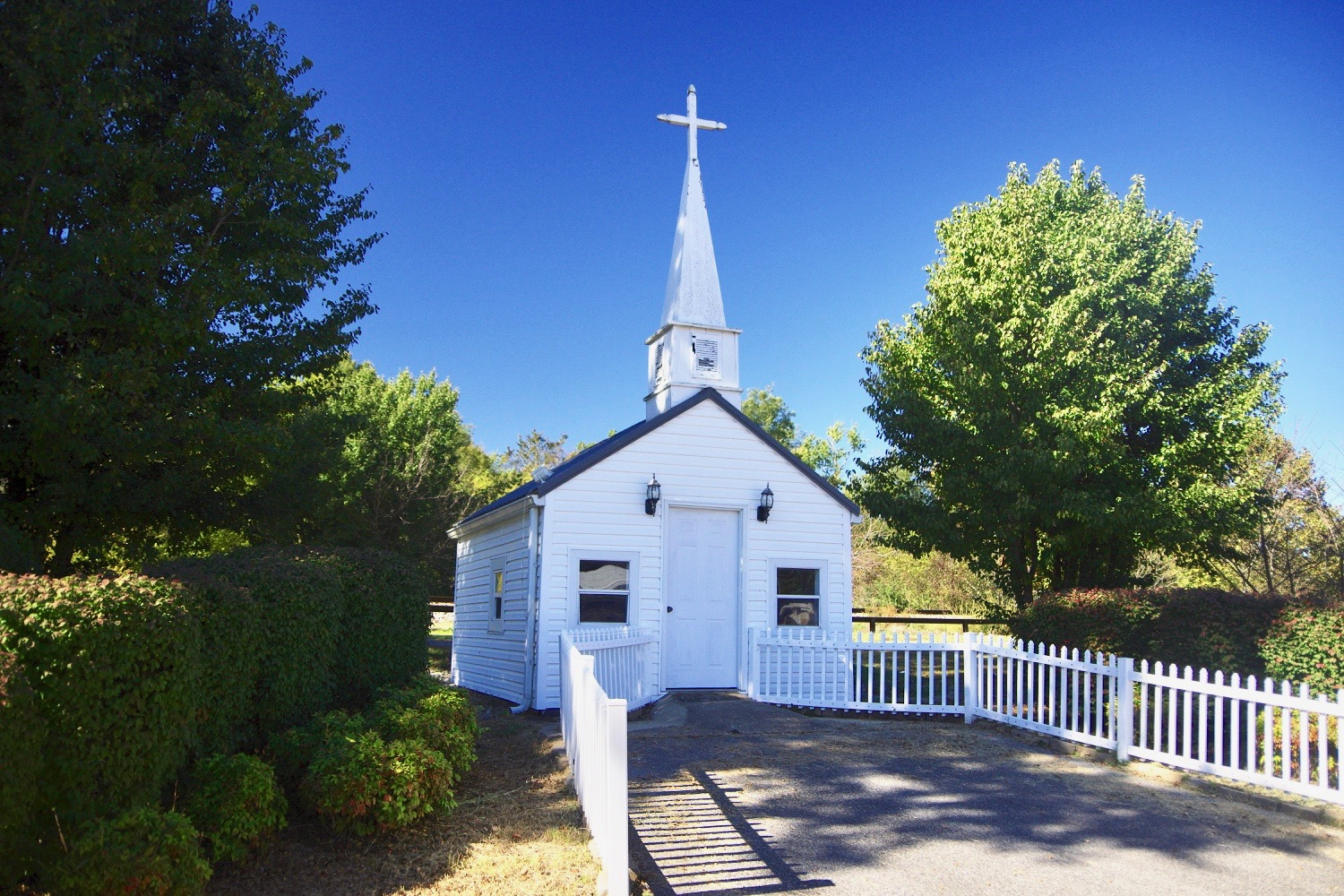
- Tiny church at Bardwell City Park

- Location of Bardwell in Carlisle County, Kentucky.
- Coordinates: 36°52′22″N 89°0′36″W
- Country: United States
- State: Kentucky
- County: Carlisle

Area
  - Total: 0.86 sq mi (2.24 km^{2})
  - Land: 0.86 sq mi (2.24 km^{2})
  - Water: 0.0039 sq mi (0.01 km^{2})
- Elevation: 360 ft (110 m)

Population (2020)
  - Total: 714
  - Density: 826.0/sq mi (318.91/km^{2})
- Time zone: UTC-6 (Central (CST))
  - Summer (DST): UTC-5 (CDT)
- ZIP code: 42023
- Area codes: 270 & 364
- FIPS code: 21-03664
- GNIS feature ID: 0486336

Bardwell is a home rule-class city in and the county seat of Carlisle County, Kentucky, United States. The city was formally incorporated by the state assembly in 1878. The population was 714 at the 2020 census, down from 723 in 2010. Bardwell is included in the Paducah, KY-IL Metropolitan Statistical Area.

== History ==
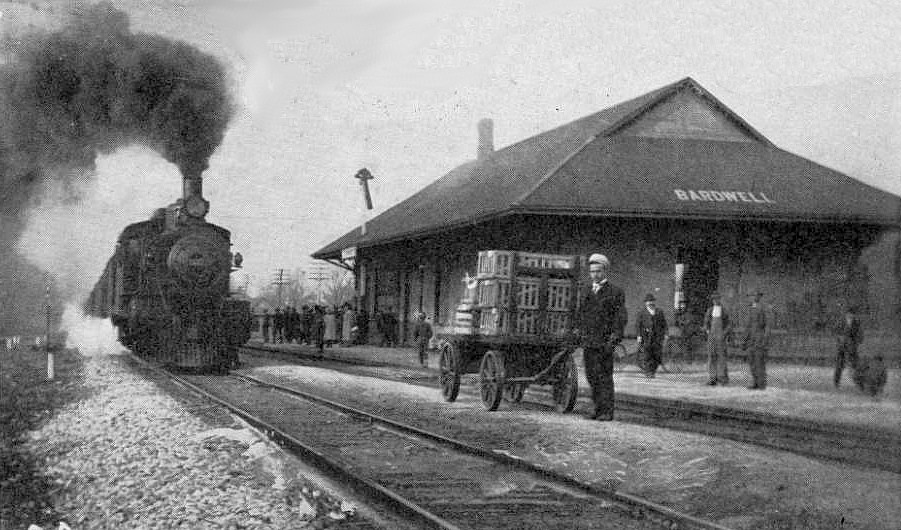
A train arrives at Bardwell's Illinois Central station, circa 1910

Bardwell was founded in 1874 when a predecessor rail line of the Illinois Central Railroad was extended to that point. It may have initially been known as "Crittenden" after Governor John J. Crittenden, but that name was already in use elsewhere in the state, so the name was changed to "Bardwell." According to some sources, "Bardwell" was the name of a railroad superintendent whose name had been applied to a railroad construction camp near the town site. Other sources suggest the name was inspired by a "boarded well" at the camp.

During their session of 1877–1878, the Kentucky General Assembly passed an act incorporating Bardwell. The original municipal boundaries consisted of a circle with a radius of 0.5 miles (0.80 km), centered on the local train station for the Illinois Central Railroad.

Upon the creation of Carlisle County in 1886, the nearby city of Arlington was initially named the seat of the new county. Bardwell challenged this decision, however, and due to Bardwell's more central location, county officials agreed, and moved the seat to Bardwell.

== Geography ==
Bardwell is located northwest of the center of Carlisle County at 36°52′22″N 89°0′36″W (36.872690, -89.010026). U.S. Routes 51 and 62 intersect in the northern part of the city. US 51 leads south 29 miles (47 km) to Fulton on the Tennessee line, while US 62 leads northeast 30 miles (48 km) to Paducah on the Ohio River. The two highways together lead northwest 8 miles (13 km) to Wickliffe on the Mississippi River.

According to the United States Census Bureau, Bardwell has a total area of 0.89 square miles (2.3 km^{2}), all of it land.

== Demographics ==
Historical population
Census	Pop.	Note	%±
1890	578		—
1900	1,512		161.6%
1910	1,087		−28.1%
1920	1,120		3.0%
1930	1,139		1.7%
1940	1,218		6.9%
1950	1,033		−15.2%
1960	1,067		3.3%
1970	1,049		−1.7%
1980	988		−5.8%
1990	819		−17.1%
2000	799		−2.4%
2010	723		−9.5%
2020	714		−1.2%
U.S. Decennial Census

As of the census of 2000, there were 799 people, 367 households, and 229 families residing in the city. The population density was 1,335.8 inhabitants per square mile (515.8/km^{2}). There were 425 housing units at an average density of 710.5 per square mile (274.3/km^{2}). The racial makeup of the city was 94.62% White, 3.00% African American, 0.63% Native American, 0.63% from other races, and 1.13% from two or more races. 2.75% of the population is Hispanic or Latino of any race.

There were 367 households, out of which 29.2% had children under the age of 18 living with them, 42.0% were married couples living together, 15.3% had a female householder with no husband present, and 37.6% were non-families. 34.9% of all households were made up of individuals, and 21.0% had someone living alone who was 65 years of age or older. The average household size was 2.18 and the average family size was 2.75.

In the city, the population was spread out, with 23.0% under the age of 18, 7.3% from 18 to 24, 24.4% from 25 to 44, 21.3% from 45 to 64, and 24.0% who were 65 years of age or older. The median age was 41 years. For every 100 females, there were 82.4 males. For every 100 females age 18 and over, there were 80.9 males.

The median income for a household in the city was $21,406, and the median income for a family was $25,500. Males had a median income of $24,028 versus $16,618 for females. The per capita income for the city was $14,976. About 19.7% of families and 24.3% of the population were below the poverty line, including 37.7% of those under age 18 and 16.6% of those age 65 or over.

== Notable people ==
- Clyde Ehrhardt, offensive lineman for the Washington Redskins
- Thomas L. Glenn, congressman from Idaho who served a single term as a Populist
- Donald Frank Hendrix (November 19, 1959 – November 15, 2020), outstanding pianist and organist who played for 5 governors, David Letterman, at the Miss America and Miss Kentucky pageants, and at First Christian Church, Murray, KY. He lost his life during the COVID-19 pandemic.
- Roy Mahlon Shelbourne, U.S. federal judge born in Bardwell, who also practiced law here for 14 years
- Martha Stewart, actress of musical theatre, film, and television, born in Bardwell
- M. K. Turk, college basketball coach and player at Livingston University (Alabama), Copiah-Lincoln Junior College (Mississippi) and the University of Southern Mississippi

== Climate ==
The climate in this area is characterized by hot, humid summers and generally mild to cool winters. According to the Köppen Climate Classification system, Bardwell has a humid subtropical climate, abbreviated "Cfa" on climate maps.
