= List of Kentucky supplemental roads and rural secondary highways (800–899) =

Kentucky supplemental roads and rural secondary highways (800–899)
- Highway markers for KY 800 and KY 899

Highway names
- Interstates: Interstate nn (I-nn)
- US Highways: U.S. Highway nn (US nn)
- State: KY nn

System links
- Kentucky State Highway System; Interstate; US; State; Parkways
- Supplemental/Rural Secondary; 1–199; 200–299; 300–399; 400–499; 500–599; 600–699; 700–799; 800–899; 900–999; 1000–1499; 1500–1999; 2000–2499; 2500–2999; 3000–3499; 3500–6999

Kentucky supplemental roads and rural secondary highways are the lesser two of the four functional classes of highways constructed and maintained by the Kentucky Transportation Cabinet, the state-level agency that constructs and maintains highways in Kentucky. The agency splits its inventory of state highway mileage into four categories:

- The State Primary System includes Interstate Highways, Parkways, and other long-distance highways of statewide importance that connect the state's major cities, including much of the courses of Kentucky's U.S. Highways.
- The State Secondary System includes highways of regional importance that connect the state's smaller urban centers, including those county seats not served by the state primary system.
- The Rural Secondary System includes highways of local importance, such as farm-to-market roads and urban collectors.
- Supplemental Roads are the set of highways not in the first three systems, including frontage roads, bypassed portions of other state highways, and rural roads that only serve their immediate area.

The same-numbered highway can comprise sections of road under different categories. This list contains descriptions of Supplemental Roads and highways in the Rural Secondary System numbered 800 to 899 that do not have portions within the State Primary and State Secondary systems.

== Kentucky Route 800 ==
Kentucky Route 800
- Location: Era–Bluff Spring
- Length: 18.919 mi (30.447 km)

Kentucky Route 800 is a 18.919-mile-long (30.447 km) rural secondary and state supplemental highway in Christian County. The highway begins at KY 109 (Dawson Springs Road) north of Era. KY 800 heads east along Crofton–Dawson Road, which curvaceously winds its way east toward Crofton, during which the highway crosses Brushy Fork of the Tradewater River. The highway enters the city of Crofton along Princeton Street and meets the eastern end of KY 1348 (Poole Mill Road). In the center of town, KY 800 intersects US 41 (Madisonville Street) and a north–south CSX rail line. The highway leaves town along Crofton–Fruit Hill Road and has a diamond interchange with I-169. At its junction with KY 1914 (Crofton Fire Tower Road), KY 800 veers southeast and crosses the West Fork of the Pond River on its way to Fruit Hill. There, the route runs concurrently with KY 189 (North Greenville Road). KY 800 splits east onto Fruit Hill–Red Bridge Road, which crosses Dulin Creek east of Fruit Hill and west of its terminus at KY 107 (Greenville Road) north of Bluff Spring.

== Kentucky Route 813 ==
Kentucky Route 813
- Location: Apex–Mortons Gap
- Length: 16.593 mi (26.704 km)

Kentucky Route 813 is a 16.593-mile-long (26.704 km) rural secondary and state supplemental highway in northeastern Christian County and southeastern Hopkins County. The highway begins at KY 189 (North Greenville Road) at Apex. KY 813 follows Apex–White Plains Road north to the Christian–Hopkins county line at the West Fork of the Pond River. The highway continues along Mount Carmel Road through the hamlet of Mount Carmel into the city of White Plains. KY 813 veers west onto Church Street then north along Bob Bruce Drive, which intersects US 62 (Greenville Road). The highway heads north out of town along Concord Drive to the village of Concord, where the route turns west onto White Plains Road. KY 813 curves northwest and crosses Drakes Creek and the Western Kentucky Parkway just east of the parkway's interchange with the Pennyrile Parkway and I-69. The highway closely parallels the northbound lanes of I-69 and meets the western end of KY 1622 (Trabue Road). KY 813 parallels an interchange ramp northeast then turns west onto White City Road, which has a partial cloverleaf interchange with I-69. The highway veers southwest into the city of Mortons Gap, where the route meets the northern end of KY 1215 (Mortons Gap–White Plains Road). KY 813 continues west along Cross Street and intersects a north–south CSX rail line just east of its terminus at US 41 (Hopkinsville Road).

== Kentucky Route 820 ==
Kentucky Route 820
- Location: Etoile–Mount Hermon
- Length: 6.285 mi (10.115 km)

Kentucky Route 820 is a 6.285-mile-long (10.115 km) rural secondary highway in southern Barren County. The highway begins at KY 249 (Roseville Road) west of Etoile. KY 820 heads east on Caney Fork Road, which parallels the eponymous stream and crosses it on either side of the village of Etoile, where the route turns south. The highway turns east again and follows Etoile Road to its eastern terminus at KY 63 (Tompkinsville Road) north of Mount Hermon in neighboring Monroe County.

== Kentucky Route 839 ==
Kentucky Route 839
- Location: Tompkinsville–Eighty Eight
- Length: 16.951 mi (27.280 km)

Kentucky Route 839 is a 16.951-mile-long (27.280 km) rural secondary highway in northern Monroe County and southeastern Barren County. The highway extends from KY 63 near Tompkinsville north to KY 90 near Eighty-Eight. KY 839 begins at KY 63 (Old Glasgow Road) near the north city limit of Tompkinsville. The highway heads east and then north along Sulphur Lick Road. KY 839 crosses the East Fork of the Barren River and meets the western end of KY 2768 (Mount Gilead Road) on either side of Forkton. The highway runs concurrently with KY 678 through Sulphur Lick; KY 678 heads east along Homer Bartley Road south of the village and west along Mount Hermon Road north of town. KY 839 crosses Skaggs Creek and meets the southern end of KY 1324 (Temple Hill Road) south of the Monroe–Barren county line. The highway continues as Nobob Road, which crosses Eaton Branch of Nobob Creek and Nobob Creek itself south of Nobob. KY 839 crosses Glover Creek and Brushy Fork of Falling Timber Creek before reaching its northern terminus at KY 90 (Burkesville Road).

== Kentucky Route 845 ==
Kentucky Route 845
- Location: Monterey–Long Ridge
- Length: 20.209 mi (32.523 km)

Kentucky Route 845 is a 20.209-mile-long (32.523 km) rural secondary highway in Owen County. The C-shaped highway extends from US 127 north of Monterey to US 127 at Long Ridge. KY 845 begins along Old Monterey Road, which becomes KY 3549 when KY 845 turns east onto Greenup Road. The highway runs concurrently with KY 227 (Georgetown Road) at Hesler and continues along Breck Road to Breck. There, the route has a very short concurrency with KY 1883, which heads east as Hammond School Road and west along Elk Lake Resort Road. North of Breck, KY 845 briefly overlaps KY 330 (Owenton Road), from which the route heads northwest along Eden Shale Road to KY 22. KY 845 joins KY 22 west to Sweet Owen. At Sweet Owen, the route leaves KY 22 along Sweet Owen Road and crosses Stevens Creek before reaching its northern terminus at US 127 at Long Ridge.

== Kentucky Route 848 ==
Kentucky Route 848
- Location: Trenton–Keysburg
- Length: 14.998 mi (24.137 km)

Kentucky Route 848 is a 14.998-mile-long (24.137 km) rural secondary highway in southern Todd County and southwestern Logan County. The highway begins at a four-legged intersection with US 41 and KY 104 in the city of Trenton; US 41 follows Main Street, and KY 104 heads south along Clarksville Street and north briefly with US 41 before turning onto Third Street. KY 848 heads north along Pinchem Road, which turns east after intersecting a CSX rail line. The highway heads southeast across Spring Creek and intersects KY 181 (Guthrie Road) at Pinchem. KY 848 intersects US 79 (Russellville Road) east of Anderson. The highway continues as Hadensville Road through Hadensville, where the route intersects an R.J. Corman Railroad Group rail line. KY 848 crosses Elk Fork at Darnell and crosses the Todd–Logan county line. The highway continues along Darnell Road to its east end at KY 102 (Keysburg Road) west of Keysburg.

== Kentucky Route 878 ==
Kentucky Route 878
- Location: Sulphur Springs–Yeaman
- Length: 12.109 mi (19.488 km)

Kentucky Route 878 is a 12.109-mile-long (19.488 km) rural secondary highway in eastern Ohio County and northwestern Grayson County. The highway begins at KY 69 near Sulphur Springs and heads southeast along Olaton Road. KY 878 meets the southern end of KY 919 (Davidson Road) and turns east at a T-intersection with KY 1164 (Cedar Grove Road) just north of that highway's junction with KY 1544. The highway intersects KY 505 (Dan Road) and crosses Caney Creek, a tributary of the Rough River, at Olaton, east of which the route crosses the Ohio–Grayson county line. KY 878 bridges Browns Creek and Mistaken Creek before curving north to its terminus at KY 54 (Owensboro Road) near Hites Falls north of Yeaman.

== Kentucky Route 890 ==
Kentucky Route 890
- Location: Clifty–Rosewood
- Length: 10.206 mi (16.425 km)

Kentucky Route 890 is a 10.206-mile-long (16.425 km) rural secondary highway in northern Todd County and southern Muhlenberg County. The highway begins at concurrent highways KY 107 and KY 181 at Clifty. KY 890 heads north along Rabbit Ridge Road. North of the Todd–Muhlenberg county line, the highway intersects the east end of KY 831. KY 890 continues north and crosses Long Creek before curving east to its terminus at KY 181 (Greenville Road) west of Rosewood.
