= Kentucky Route 189 =

State highway in Kentucky, United States

Kentucky Route 189
- KY 189 highlighted in red

Route information
- Maintained by KYTC
- Length: 32.027 mi (51.542 km)

Major junctions
- South end: KY 507 / Flat Rock Road near Allegre
- KY 107 at Fearsville US 62 near Greenville KY 181 in Greenville
- North end: US 62 near Powderly

Location
- Country: United States
- State: Kentucky

Highway system
- Kentucky State Highway System; Interstate; US; State; Parkways
← KY 188	→ KY 190

Kentucky Route 189 (KY 189) is a 32.027-mile-long (51.542 km) state highway in Kentucky that runs from Kentucky Route 507 and Flat Rock Road west of Allegre to U.S. Route 62 northeast of Powderly via Fearsville.

== Route description ==
KY 189 starts at an intersection with KY 507 in rural western Todd County between Allegre and Pilot Rock. It enters northeastern Christian County about two miles (3.2 km) from the beginning. It passes through the communities of Fearsville and Fruit Hill and respectively has intersections with Kentucky Routes107 and 800 in that area.

KY 189 then crosses the Pond River into Muhlenberg County. It intersects U.S. Route 62 (US 62) on the west side of Greenville. After the junction with KY 181, KY 189 closely follows US 62 from Greenville's northern outskirts and the southern end of Powderly all the way to the route's current northern terminus at another intersection with US 62 just southwest of Central City.

== History ==
At one time, KY 189 ran concurrently with US 62 from the second junction between the two routes and Central City. KY 189 had also bypassed Central City to the west and ended at a junction with US 431 just south of South Carrollton. That bypass was also designated as part of the truck route of US 431 and KY 70 on the west side of Central City. KY 189 was decommissioned from the Central City bypass when US 431 and KY 70 were rerouted to overlap US 62 and then turn onto the bypass. Since then, KY 189 has ended at the US 62 junction just south of Central City.

== Major intersections ==
County	Location	mi	km	Destinations	Notes
Todd		0.000	0.000	KY 507 (Pilot Rock Road) / Flat Rock Road	Southern terminus; continues as Flat Rock Road beyond KY 507
Christian		5.831	9.384	KY 1682 west (Antioch Road)	Eastern terminus of KY 1682
Christian	Fearsville	7.242	11.655	KY 107 north (Greenville Road)	South end of KY 107 overlap
Christian	Fearsville	7.305	11.756	KY 107 south (Greenville Road)	North end of KY 107 overlap
Christian		8.879	14.289	KY 800 west (Crofton-Fruit Hill Road)	South end of KY 800 overlap
Christian		9.229	14.853	KY 800 east (Fruithill-Red Bridge Road)	North end of KY 800 overlap
Christian		14.846	23.892	KY 1914 south (Crofton-Fire Tower Road) / A. Jordan Road / Apex Loop	Northern terminus of KY 1914
Christian		16.138	25.972	KY 813 north (Apex-White Springs Road)	Southern terminus of KY 813
Muhlenberg		20.496	32.985	KY 853 east	Western terminus of KY 853
Muhlenberg		21.561	34.699	KY 1473 north	Southern terminus of KY 1473
Muhlenberg		23.445	37.731	KY 175 north	Southern terminus of KY 175
Muhlenberg		26.815	43.155	US 62	
Muhlenberg	Greenville	28.316	45.570	KY 181 (West Depot Street / Luzerne Drive)	
Muhlenberg	Greenville	29.691	47.783	KY 189 Conn. west (Dame Way)	Eastern terminus of KY 189 Conn
Muhlenberg	Powderly	30.903	49.734	KY 1380 south (Cleaton Road) / Cleaton Road	Northern terminus of KY 1380
Muhlenberg		32.027	51.542	US 62 (Everly Brothers Boulevard)	Northern terminus
1.000 mi = 1.609 km; 1.000 km = 0.621 mi: Concurrency terminus

== Greenville connector ==
Kentucky Route 189 Connector
- Location: Greenville
- Length: 0.135 mi (217 m)

Kentucky Route 189 Connector (KY 189 Conn) is a 0.135-mile-long (0.217 km) connector route of KY 189 that connects to U.S. Route 62 in northeastern Greenville.

=== Major intersections ===
The entire route is in Greenville, Muhlenberg County.

mi	km	Destinations	Notes
0.000	0.000	US 62	Western terminus
0.135	0.217	KY 189 (West Everly Brothers Boulevard)	Eastern terminus
1.000 mi = 1.609 km; 1.000 km = 0.621 mi
