= Kentucky Route 109 =

State highway in Kentucky

Kentucky Route 109
- KY 109 highlighted in red

Route information
- Maintained by KYTC
- Length: 90.309 mi (145.338 km)

Major junctions
- North end: KY 56 in rural western Union
- US 60 at Sturgis KY 120 in Providence; KY 70 at Beulah; I-69 at Dawson Springs; US 62 in Dawson Springs; US 68 / US 41 / KY 80 in Hopkinsville I-169 at Hopkinsville
- South end: KY 115 northeast of Oak Grove

Location
- Country: United States
- State: Kentucky
- Counties: Christian, Hopkins, Union, Webster

Highway system
- Kentucky State Highway System; Interstate; US; State; Parkways
← KY 108	→ KY 110

Kentucky Route 109 (KY 109) is an 90.309-mile-long (145.338 km) north–south state highway that traverses four counties in western Kentucky's Pennyrile region. It traverses Christian, Hopkins, Webster, and Union counties.

== Route description ==
=== Christian County ===
KY 109's southern terminus is located in the unincorporated community of Saint Elmo, where it intersects with KY 115 just north of I-24 outside Oak Grove. It joins US 41 on the southeast side of Hopkinsville before that route's interchange with the Pennyrile Parkway (officially designated as I-169). KY 109 runs concurrently with several US and Kentucky routes throughout downtown Hopkinsville before leaving the city and crossing KY 1682 (Hopkinsville Bypass). After its junction with KY 800, it traverses the Pennyrile State Forest; the junction with KY 398 provides access to the Pennyrile Forest State Resort Park. KY 109 traverses more forested areas before entering Hopkins County.

=== Hopkins County ===
At Dawson Springs, KY 109 has junctions with US 62, where it has a brief concurrency before branching off to traverse an interchange with I-69 (formerly the Western Kentucky Parkway) before exiting the town. It meets KY 70 at Beulah and KY 502 just south of the Webster County line.

=== Webster and Union Counties ===
KY 109 meets KY 120 and a few other routes in Providence. It continues northwestward into Union County; at Sturgis, it begins a concurrency with U.S. Route 60 (US 60) for a few miles. It branches off from US 60 to traverse the Henshaw community. KY 109 ends at an intersection with KY 56 a few miles east of the bridge over the Ohio River that marks the Illinois–Kentucky state line near Old Shawneetown, Illinois.

== Major intersections ==
County	Location	mi	km	Destinations	Notes
Union	The Rocks	0.000	0.000	KY 56	Northern terminus
Union		2.800	4.506	KY 668 west	Eastern terminus of KY 668
Union		4.613	7.424	KY 130 north / KY 1257 west	Southern terminus of KY 130; eastern terminus of KY 1257
Union		6.626	10.664	KY 1508 south	Northern terminus of KY 1508
Union		8.688	13.982	KY 492 north	Northern end of KY 492 overlap
Union		8.835	14.219	KY 492 south	Southern end of KY 492 overlap
Union		10.484	16.872	KY 1508 north	Southern terminus of KY 1508
Union	Grangertown	10.789	17.363	KY 2917 south	Northern terminus of KY 2917
Union		11.066	17.809	KY 2918 south	Northern terminus of KY 2918
Union	Sturgis	12.075	19.433	US 60 east (Main Street)	Northern/eastern end of US 60 concurrency; hospital to the north
Union	Sturgis	12.147	19.549	KY 365 south (Monroe Street)	Northern terminus of KY 365
Union		14.633	23.550	KY 923 west	Northern end of KY 923 overlap
Union		14.780	23.786	KY 923 east	Southern end of KY 923 overlap
Union		16.202	26.075	KY 141 north	Southern terminus of KY 141
Union	Sullivan	16.309	26.247	US 60 west – Marion	Southern end of US 60 concurrency; 60 continues south; 109 to the east
Webster		19.451	31.303	KY 143 south	Northern terminus of KY 143
Webster	Wheatcroft	21.055	33.885	KY 2837 north	Southern terminus of KY 2837
Webster		21.820	35.116	KY 493 south	Northern terminus of KY 493
Webster	Clay	23.826	38.344	KY 132 east	Northern end of KY 132 overlap
Webster	Clay	24.022	38.660	KY 132 west	Southern end of KY 132 overlap
Webster		26.887	43.270	KY 143 north	Southern terminus of KY 143
Webster		27.656	44.508	KY 1525 south	Northern terminus of KY 1525
Webster		29.633	47.690	KY 670 east – Dixon	Western terminus of KY 670
Webster	Providence	31.177	50.175	KY 120 / KY 293 north (Main Street)	Northern end of KY 293 overlap; 293 north follows 120 east
Webster	Providence	31.223	50.249	KY 293 south (Cedar Street)	Southern end of KY 293 overlap
Hopkins		33.526	53.955	KY 814 north (Cutoff Road)	Southern terminus of KY 814
Hopkins		35.776	57.576	KY 1034 east (Rose Creek Road)	Western terminus of KY 1034
Hopkins		37.167	59.814	KY 291 south (Dalton Road)	Northern terminus of KY 291
Hopkins	Rabbit Ridge	39.973	64.330	KY 502 north (Coiltown Road)	Southern terminus of KY 502
Hopkins	Beulah	41.456	66.717	KY 70 (Beulah Road)	
Hopkins		44.135	71.028	KY 2273 north (Fergusontown Road)	Southern terminus of KY 2273
Hopkins		46.813	75.338	KY 1220 west (Bull Creek Road)	Eastern terminus of KY 1220
Hopkins		46.920	75.510	I-69 south – Paducah	Exit 192; ramp from WB parkway/SB I-69 and ramp to WB parkway/SB I-69
Hopkins		47.040	75.704	I-69 north – Elizabethtown	Exit 192; ramp from EB parkway/NB I-69 and ramp to EB parkway/NB I-69
Hopkins	Dawson Springs	48.145	77.482	KY 1246 north (West Rosedale Lane) – 4-H Camp	Southern terminus of KY 1246
Hopkins	Dawson Springs	48.762	78.475	US 62 east (Nortonville Road) – Nortonville	Northern/Eastern end of US 62 concurrency
Hopkins	Dawson Springs	49.675	79.944	US 62 west (West Arcadia Avenue) – Lake Beshear	Southern/Western end of US 62 concurrency
Christian		55.938	90.023	Old KY 398 Road	Former route of KY 398
Christian		56.548	91.005	KY 398 south (Bainbridge Road) – Pennyrile Forest State Resort Park	Northern terminus of KY 398
Christian		58.159	93.598	KY 1338 north (Collins Bridge Road)	Southern terminus of KY 1338
Christian		59.028	94.996	KY 1348 east (Poole Mill Road)	Northern end of KY 1348 overlap
Christian		59.578	95.881	KY 1348 west (Pennyrile Forest State Park Road) – Pennyrile Forest State Resort Park	Southern end of KY 1348 overlap
Christian		62.761	101.004	KY 800 east (Crofton-Dawson Creek Road)	Western terminus of KY 800
Christian		66.822	107.540	KY 1026 south (Clark Store Sinking Fork Road)	Northern terminus of KY 1026
Christian	Hopkinsville	74.079	119.219	KY 1682 (Eagle Way)	Hospital to the west
Christian	Hopkinsville	75.152	120.945	US 68 / KY 80 west (West 7th Street)	Northern end of concurrency with US 68 and KY 80
Christian	Hopkinsville	75.867	122.096	KY 1007 (North Drive)	Hospital to the south
Christian	Hopkinsville	76.596	123.269	US 41 south / KY 107 south (South Main Street)	Southern terminus of one-way south fork of US 41; northern terminus of one-way south fork of KY 107
Christian	Hopkinsville	76.719	123.467	US 41 north / KY 107 north (South Virginia Street)	US 41 north one-way to the north; northern terminus of one-way branch of KY 107; begin concurrency with 41 south and 107 north
Christian	Hopkinsville	76.719	123.467	KY 2544 south (South Liberty Street)	Southern terminus of KY 2544 (southbound)
Christian	Hopkinsville	76.779	123.564	KY 2544 north (South Clay Street)	Southern terminus of KY 2544 (northbound 2544)
Christian	Hopkinsville	76.899	123.757	KY 107 north (South Campbell Street)	Southern/eastern end of KY 107 overlap
Christian	Hopkinsville	76.984	123.894	US 41 Alt. south (South Walnut Street)	Northern terminus of US 41Alt.
Christian	Hopkinsville	77.989	125.511	US 68 / KY 80 east (McLean Avenue) to I-169	Eastern end of US 68/KY 80 concurrency; 109 continues to follow 41 east
Christian	Hopkinsville	78.873	126.934	KY 380 south (Skyline Drive)	Northern terminus of KY 380
Christian	Hopkinsville	79.430	127.830	I-169 south to I-24 – Fort Campbell, Paducah, Nashville	Exit 8 from southbound I-168 and ramp to southbound I-169
Christian	Hopkinsville	79.577	128.067	I-169 north to I-69 – Henderson	Exit 8 from northbound I-169 and ramp to northbound I-169
Christian	Hopkinsville	79.869	128.537	US 41 south (Pembroke Road) – Pembroke	Southern end of US 41 concurrency
Christian		80.395	129.383	US 68 Byp. (Dr. Martin Luther King Jr. Way) to US 41 Truck – Hopkinsville, Fort Campbell	41 Truck via eastbound Bypass 68
Christian	Longview	85.616	137.786	KY 1027 (Long Pond Road)	
Christian		89.826	144.561	KY 1453 west (Elmo Road)	Northern end of KY 1453 overlap
Christian		90.309	145.338	KY 115 / KY 1453 east (Pembroke Oak Grove Road)	Southern terminus of KY 109; 1453 east continues via 115 north
1.000 mi = 1.609 km; 1.000 km = 0.621 mi: Concurrency terminus; Incomplete access
