= Kentucky Route 181 =

State highway in Kentucky, United States

Kentucky Route 181
- KY 181 highlighted in red

Route information
- Maintained by KYTC
- Length: 42.840 mi (68.944 km)
- Existed: 1929–present

Major junctions
- North end: KY 81 at Bremen
- KY 70 at Midland; Future I-569 / Western Kentucky Parkway near Greenville; KY 189 in Greenville; US 62 / KY 176 in Greenville; KY 107 at Clifty; US 68 / KY 80 near Elkton; US 68 Bus. in Elkton; US 41 near Guthrie
- South end: US 79 / KY 294 / KY 2128 at Tiny Town

Location
- Country: United States
- State: Kentucky
- Counties: Todd, Muhlenberg

Highway system
- Kentucky State Highway System; Interstate; US; State; Parkways
← KY 180	→ KY 182

Kentucky Route 181 (KY 181) is a north–south state highway that traverses two counties in western Kentucky.

== Route description ==
=== Todd County ===
KY 181 starts at a crossroads junction with U.S. Route 79 and Kentucky Route 2128 located near the Tennessee state line in the town of Guthrie, in southern Todd County. This is about 0.28 miles (0.45 km) north of the state line separating Todd County from Montgomery County, Tennessee. KY 181 has junctions with KY 294 and then a crossroad intersection with US 41. KY 181 goes north to intersect with KY 848, and then KY 104 before making it into the Todd County seat of Elkton. It intersects US 68 Business at the Todd County Courthouse in downtown Elkton. Further north, it crosses the divided four-lane Jefferson Davis Highway, the mainline US 68, which runs concurrently with KY 80 just north of the city limits. Kentucky Route 106's western terminus is a junction with KY 181 almost immediately after the US 68 junction. Junctions with KY 171 and KY 507 follows after KY 181 leaves the Elkton area.

At Clifty, KY 107 runs concurrent with KY 181 for 2.01 miles (3.23 km) through that community, with a junction with KY 890 located within that concurrency. At Tyewhopperty, it intersects KY 1785 shortly before entering Muhlenberg County.

=== Muhlenberg County ===
After making its entrance into Muhlenberg County, KY 181 has a junction with Kentucky Route 973, which provides access to the Lake Malone State Park. Another junction with KY 890 follows, and then KY 1163 (Old Russellville Pike) before reaching the city of Greenville. In downtown Greenville, it meets U.S. Route 62 (US 62) and KY 176 at the town square. After the brief concurrency with US 62, KY 181 crosses the four-lane KY 189 by-pass before meeting the Exit 53 interchange of the Wendell H. Ford Western Kentucky Parkway. It then intersects KY 70 at Midland before reaching its northern terminus at the KY 81 junction in the community of Bremen just short of the McLean County line.

== History ==
As a charter route in Kentucky's state highway system when it was introduced in 1929, KY 181's original alignment through Todd and Muhlenberg Counties ran the present-day alignments of the following highways:

- KY 104 from the Tennessee state line north of Clarksville to its junction of KY 1755,
- The entire alignment of KY 1755,
- KY 181's present-day alignment to near Clifty,
- KY 107 west to Kirkmansville,
- some now-county-maintained roads between Kirkmansville and Weir, including the McKinney Bend of the Pond River, and
- most of KY 171's present-day alignment from Weir to Greenville, .

KY 181 was reallocated to its current alignment by the mid-1940s. The extension of KY 181 from Greenville to Bremen was authorized no later than 1950.

== Major intersections ==
County	Location	mi	km	Destinations	Notes
Todd	Guthrie	0.000	0.000	US 79 / KY 2128 south to I-24 – Clarksville	Southern terminus of KY 181; northern terminus of KY 2128; road continues southward as KY 2128
Todd	Guthrie	0.100	0.161	KY 294 west (Tiny Town Road)	Eastern terminus of KY 294
Todd	Guthrie	0.214	0.344	US 41 to US 79 north	
Todd		4.04	6.50	KY 848 (Penchem Road)	
Todd		8.018	12.904	KY 1753 south (Elkton-Trenton Road)	Northern terminus of KY 1753
Todd		10.403	16.742	KY 104 south (Old Trenton Road)	Northern terminus of KY 104
Todd	Elkton	12.021– 12.098	19.346– 19.470	US 68 Bus. (West Main Street)	Roundabout around the Todd County Courthouse
Todd	Elkton	13.119	21.113	US 68 / KY 80 (Jefferson Davis Highway) – Hopkinsville, Russellville	
Todd		13.648	21.964	KY 106 east (Blue and Gray Park Road)	Western (southern) terminus of KY 106
Todd		16.252	26.155	KY 171 (Allegre Road)	
Todd		19.388	31.202	KY 507 (Highland Lick Road)	
Todd	Clifty	25.118	40.424	KY 107 south (Clifty-Kirkmansville Road)	Southern end of KY 107 overlap
Todd	Clifty	25.872	41.637	KY 890 north (Rabbit Ridge Road)	Southern terminus of KY 890
Todd		27.128	43.658	KY 107 north (Todd-Deer Lick Road) – Lewisburg	Northern end of KY 107 overlap
Todd		29.867	48.066	KY 1785 east (Jason Ridge Road)	Western terminus of KY 1785
Muhlenberg		32.444	52.214	KY 973 east – Lake Malone State Park	Western terminus of KY 973
Muhlenberg		34.085	54.854	KY 890 south	Northern terminus of KY 890
Muhlenberg		40.192	64.683	KY 1163 south (Old Russellville Pike)	Northern terminus of KY 1163
Muhlenberg	Greenville	41.97	67.54	US 62 west (Hopkinsville Street)	Southern end of US 62 overlap
Muhlenberg	Greenville	42.113	67.774	KY 176 east (East Main Cross Street)	Western end of KY 176
Muhlenberg	Greenville	42.927	69.084	US 62 east (North Main Street) – Central City	Northern end of US 62 overlap
Muhlenberg	Greenville	43.525	70.047	KY 189 – Hopkinsville, Central City	
Muhlenberg	Greenville	43.813	70.510	KY 601 north	Southern end of KY 601
Muhlenberg		45.467	73.172	KY 2533 south	Northern end of KY 2533
Muhlenberg		46.28	74.48	Western Kentucky Parkway to I-69 / I-169 – Paducah, Elizabethtown	Western KY Parkway Exit 58
Muhlenberg	Midland	50.001	80.469	KY 70 – Madisonville, Central City	
Muhlenberg		50.433	81.164	KY 2544 east	Western end of KY 2544
Muhlenberg		54.020	86.937	KY 2551 west	Eastern terminus of KY 2551
Muhlenberg		54.949	88.432	KY 175	
Muhlenberg	Bremen	56.342	90.674	KY 81 – Calhoun, Central City	Northern terminus
Muhlenberg	1.000 mi = 1.609 km; 1.000 km = 0.621 mi: Concurrency terminus				
