= U.S. Route 41 in Kentucky =

Section of U.S. Highway in Kentucky

U.S. Route 41
- US 41 in Kentucky highlighted in red

Route information
- Maintained by KYTC
- Length: 106.952 mi (172.123 km)

Major junctions
- South end: US 41 / SR 11 at the Tennessee state line in Guthrie
- US 79 in Guthrie; I-169 in Hopkinsville; US 68 / KY 80 / KY 107 / KY 109 in Hopkinsville; US 62 in Nortonville; KY 70 in Madisonville; I-69 in Madisonville and Henderson; Audubon Parkway in Henderson; US 60 in Henderson
- North end: US 41 at the Indiana state line near Henderson

Location
- Country: United States
- State: Kentucky
- Counties: Todd, Christian, Hopkins, Webster, Henderson

Highway system
- United States Numbered Highway System; List; Special; Divided; Kentucky State Highway System; Interstate; US; State; Parkways
← KY 40	→ US 41A

U.S. Route 41 (US 41) in the state of Kentucky is a north–south United States Numbered Highway that runs from Miami, Florida, to Copper Harbor, Michigan. In Kentucky, the highway is primarily paralleled by the Pennyrile Parkway and Interstate 69. It enters Kentucky in the Todd County community of Guthrie, and leaves the state north of Henderson into Evansville. The total length of US 41 through Kentucky is a total of 106.952 miles (172.123 km).

== Route description ==
US 41 enters the state as a two-lane highway in Guthrie where it intersects US 79 and continues through Todd County through Trenton. After crossing into Christian County, US 41 goes through Pembroke before reaching Hopkinsville. In Hopkinsville, US 41 intersects the US 68 bypass and the Pennryrile Parkway which leads into downtown Hopkinsville. In downtown, US 41 has a short concurrency with US 68/KY 80 and has an intersection with the northern end of US 41A. Finally, after an intersection with the northern Hopkinsville bypass, US 41 turns to Crofton and northern Christian County.

After crossing into Hopkins County, US 41 has an incomplete intersection with the Pennyrile Parkway and goes through the small towns of Nortonville (and an intersection with US 62), Mortons Gap, Earlington. In Madisonville, US 41 is known as Main Street and has an intersection with the southern end of US 41 Alternate. After an incomplete interchange with I-69, US 41 continues onto Hanson. In eastern Webster, US 41 goes through the towns of Slaughters and Sebree. In Henderson County, US 41 enters Robards and remains a rural two-lane highway before reaching KY 425, just to the south of the Henderson city limits. At KY 425, US 41 turns to the east and intersects the current northern end of I-69 in Kentucky.

At this point, US 41 becomes a limited access four-lane highway with intersections with the Audubon Parkway, KY 2084, KY 351, and US 60. At US 60, US 41 becomes a four-lane surface road with stoplights as it crosses through the northern parts of Henderson and John James Audubon State Park. US 41 crosses the Ohio River on the Bi-State Vietnam Gold Star Bridges, known locally as the "Twin Bridges." Due to natural fluctuations of the Ohio River's path, US 41 remains in Kentucky for about one mile north of the Twin Bridges. In this section, US 41 passes by Ellis Park Race Course before crossing into Evansville, IN.

== History ==
=== U.S. Route 41E ===
U.S. Route 241
- Location: Nashville, Tennessee–Hopkinsville, Kentucky
- Existed: 1926–1930

U.S. Route 41E
- Location: Nashville, Tennessee–Hopkinsville, Kentucky
- Existed: 1930–1943

Between 1926 and 1930, US 41 followed a more westerly route between Hopkinsville and Nashville, following the current US 41 Alt., while the current US 41 alignment was US 241. From 1930 into the early 1940s, the current alignment of US 41 was signed as US 41E, and the US 41W designation was on the current alignment of US 41 Alt. south of Hopkinsville. In 1943, the western route became US 41 Alt., while US 41E became the current alignment of US 41.

=== Freeway segment in Hopkins County ===
In Hopkins County, US 41 previously followed the Pennyrile Parkway (much of which is now part of I-169 and I-69) between exits 30 and 45 until the early 1990s, when it was rerouted onto the former US 41 Alt. alignment from Madisonville to just south of Nortonville. This was the only area of the Pennyrile Parkway where tolls were never charged when the parkway was originally a toll road.

=== Recent reroutings ===
Near Henderson, US 41 was rerouted onto the few remaining miles of the Pennyrile Parkway up to its northern terminus in the 2010s before I-69 was designated onto most of the parkway to Nortonville.

== Major intersections ==
County	Location	mi	km	Destinations	Notes
Montgomery		0.000	0.000	US 41 south (SR 11) – Adams, Springfield, Nashville	Continuation into Tennessee
Todd	Guthrie	0.020	0.032	KY 2628 east (Fairgrounds Road)	Western terminus of KY 2628
Todd	Guthrie	0.593	0.954	KY 346 west (Ewing Street)	Southern terminus of KY 346
Todd	Guthrie	2.300	3.701	US 79 to I-24 – Clarksville, Russellville	
Todd	Guthrie	2.507	4.035	KY 181 (Guthrie Road) to KY 294 – Elkton	
Todd	Trenton	8.774	14.120	KY 104 south (Clarksville Street) / KY 848 east (4th Street)	Southern end of KY 104 concurrency
Todd	Trenton	8.833	14.215	KY 104 north (3rd Street) – Elkton	Northern end of KY 104 concurrency
Todd	Trenton	8.97	14.44	KY 2627 west (Cemetery Street)	Eastern terminus of KY 2627
Todd	Trenton	9.799	15.770	KY 475 north (Tress Shop Road)	Southern terminus of KY 475
Todd		12.458	20.049	KY 1453 south	Northern terminus of KY 1453
Christian	Pembroke	15.244	24.533	KY 115 / KY 1027 to I-24	
Christian	Hopkinsville	21.67	34.87	US 68 Byp. (Eagle Way / Dr. Martin Luther King Jr. Way) / US 68 Truck	
Christian	Hopkinsville	22.487	36.189	KY 109 south (Bradshaw Drive)	Southern end of KY 109 overlap
Christian	Hopkinsville	22.846– 22.917	36.767– 36.881	I-169 / US 41 Truck north – Madisonville, Fort Campbell	I-169 Exit 8; southern terminus of US 41 Truck
Christian	Hopkinsville	23.476	37.781	KY 380 west (Skyline Drive)	Eastern terminus of KY 380
Christian	Hopkinsville	24.36	39.20	US 68 east / KY 80 east – Elkton	Eastern end of US 68/KY 80 overlap
Christian	Hopkinsville	24.565	39.534	US 41 Alt. south (Walnut Street) – Oak Grove	Northern terminus of US 41 Alternate (Monteagle, TN-Hopkinsville, KY route)
Christian	Hopkinsville	24.65	39.67	KY 107 north (Campbell Street)	Western end of KY 107 overlap
Christian	Hopkinsville	24.77	39.86	KY 2544 north (Clay Street)	Northbound KY 2544 only
Christian	Hopkinsville	24.83	39.96	KY 2544 south (Liberty Street)	Southbound KY 2544 only
Christian	Hopkinsville	24.899	40.071	US 68 west / KY 80 west (West 9th Street) / KY 109 north / KY 107 south (Main St.)	Western end of US 68/KY 80, KY 107, and KY 109 overlaps
Christian	Hopkinsville	25.087	40.374	KY 2544 south	Northern terminus of KY 2544
Christian	Hopkinsville	25.46	40.97	US 41 south (Main Street)	
Christian	Hopkinsville	26.88	43.26	KY 1007 south (Saunderson Street)	Northern terminus of KY 1007
Christian	Hopkinsville	27.237	43.834	KY 1682 (Eagle Way) / US 41 Truck south to I-169	Northern terminus of US 41 Truck
Christian	Crofton	40.113	64.556	KY 800 to I-169	
Christian	Empire	42.937	69.100	KY 1298 west (Empire Road)	Eastern terminus of KY 1298
Christian		43.406	69.855	KY 407 north (Mannington Loop)	Southern terminus of KY 407
Christian	Mannington	45.888	73.850	KY 407 south (Mannington Loop)	Northern terminus of KY 407
Hopkins		47.087	75.779	KY 2647 east (McIntosh Chapel Road)	Western terminus of KY 2647
Hopkins		47.446– 47.712	76.357– 76.785	I-169 north – Henderson	Southbound off-ramp and northbound on-ramp; I-169 Exit 30
Hopkins	Nortonville	50.13	80.68	KY 2083 north (South Main Street)	Southern terminus of KY 2083
Hopkins	Nortonville	51.107	82.249	US 62 to I-169 / Western Kentucky Parkway / I-69 – Dawson Springs, Greenville, Central City	
Hopkins	Nortonville	51.994	83.676	KY 2083 south (North Main Street)	Northern terminus of KY 2083
Hopkins		52.566	84.597	KY 3059 west (Wells Road)	Eastern terminus of KY 3059
Hopkins	Mortons Gap	54.566	87.815	KY 813 south (Cross Street) to I-69	Northern terminus of KY 813
Hopkins	Earlington	57.568	92.647	KY 336 north (Wilson Avenue)	Southern terminus of KY 336
Hopkins	Earlington	58.116	93.529	KY 112 west (West Main St.)	Eastern terminus of KY 112
Hopkins	Earlington	59	95	KY 2171 (Hubert Reid Drive)	
Hopkins	Madisonville	59.342	95.502	KY 3158 north	Southern terminus of KY 3158
Hopkins	Madisonville	59.671	96.031	KY 3158 south	Northern terminus of KY 3158
Hopkins	Madisonville	60.238	96.944	KY 336 south (McLeod Lane)	Northern terminus of KY 336
Hopkins	Madisonville	61.446	98.888	KY 70 west (McLaughlin Avenue) / KY 481 south	Southern end of KY 70 concurrency
Hopkins	Madisonville	62.149	100.019	KY 262 west (Center Street) / KY 70 east to I-69 – Central City	Northern end of KY 70 concurrency
Hopkins	Madisonville	62.274	100.220	Arch Street	KY 70 west joins US 41 south here
Hopkins	Madisonville	62.489	100.566	KY 1178 west (Noel Avenue)	Eastern terminus of KY 1178
Hopkins	Madisonville	62.659	100.840	KY 1074 east (Halson Avenue)	Western terminus of KY 1074
Hopkins	Madisonville	63.573	102.311	US 41 Alt. north (Nebo Road) / KY 281 east (Island Ford Road) to I-69	Southern terminus of US 41 Alternate; western terminus of KY 281
Hopkins	Madisonville	64.429	103.688	KY 3062 west (College Drive)	Eastern terminus of KY 3062
Hopkins	Madisonville	64.652	104.047	KY 1069 north (Stagecoach Road)	Southern terminus of KY 1069
Hopkins	Madisonville	64.986– 65.079	104.585– 104.734	I-69 north – Henderson	Northbound off-ramp and southbound on-ramp; I-69 Exit 117
Hopkins		66.006	106.226	KY 2657 east (Fowler Road)	Western terminus of KY 2657
Hopkins		67.093	107.976	KY 862 east (Lenin Road)	Western terminus of KY 862
Hopkins	Hanson	68.553	110.325	KY 260 to I-69	
Hopkins	Slaughters	73.682	118.580	KY 138 to KY 120 / I-69	
Webster		76.503	123.120	KY 147 north	Southern terminus of KY 147
Webster		80.787	130.014	KY 494 west	Eastern terminus of KY 494
Webster	Sebree	83.21	133.91	KY 56 west (Main Street) / KY 370 east	Southern end of KY 56 overlap; western terminus of KY 370
Webster	Sebree	83.425	134.260	KY 56 east (Jefferson Street) to I-69	Northern end of KY 56 overlap
Henderson		86.229	138.772	KY 2097 east (Quinns Landing Road)	Western terminus of KY 2097
Henderson	Robards	87.651	141.061	KY 2678 east (Moss and Moss Road)	Western terminus of KY 2678
Henderson	Robards	88.995	143.224	KY 416 to I-69	
Henderson		90.77	146.08	KY 283 south	Northern terminus of KY 283
Henderson		94.203	151.605	KY 136 east – Calhoun	Southern end of KY 136 overlap
Henderson	Henderson	96.725	155.664	KY 425 west (Henderson Bypass) / KY 2084 north / KY 136 west	Northern end of KY 156 overlap; western terminus of KY 425 as of 2016
Henderson	Henderson	97.500	156.911	I-69 south – Hopkinsville, Fulton	I-69 exit 148; southern end of I-69 concurrency
Henderson	Henderson	98.496	158.514	Audubon Parkway east – Owensboro	Future I-69 Spur/I-369; I-69 exit 149
Henderson	Henderson	99.552	160.213	KY 2084 south	Closed permanently on November 23, 2024; was southbound exit and northbound entrance only
Henderson	Henderson	99.99	160.92	KY 351 – Henderson, Zion	I-69 exit 151
Henderson	Henderson			I-69 ends / KY 3690 north to US 60 – Henderson, Evansville	Northern end of I-69 overlap; temporary northern terminus of I-69 in Kentucky; signed as Exit 152A (KY 3690) and 152B (US 41); KY 3690 opened on November 8, 2025
Henderson	Henderson	101.958	164.085	US 60 / US 41 Alt. south – Henderson	Northern terminus of US 41 Alternate; former US 41 south
Henderson	Henderson	103.734	166.944	John James Audubon State Park	
Ohio River		105.045– 106.067	169.054– 170.698	Bi-State Vietnam Gold Star Bridges	
Henderson		106.394	171.225	KY 3522 south	Northern terminus of KY 3522
Vanderburgh	Evansville	106.952	172.123	US 41 north to I-64 / I-69 – Evansville, Chicago, Indianapolis	State line; continuation into Indiana
1.000 mi = 1.609 km; 1.000 km = 0.621 mi: Concurrency terminus; Incomplete access

== Related routes ==
U.S. Route 41
Previous state: Tennessee	Kentucky	Next state: Indiana
