= Pinchem, Todd County, Kentucky =

Unincorporated community in Kentucky, United States

Pinchem
- Unincorporated community
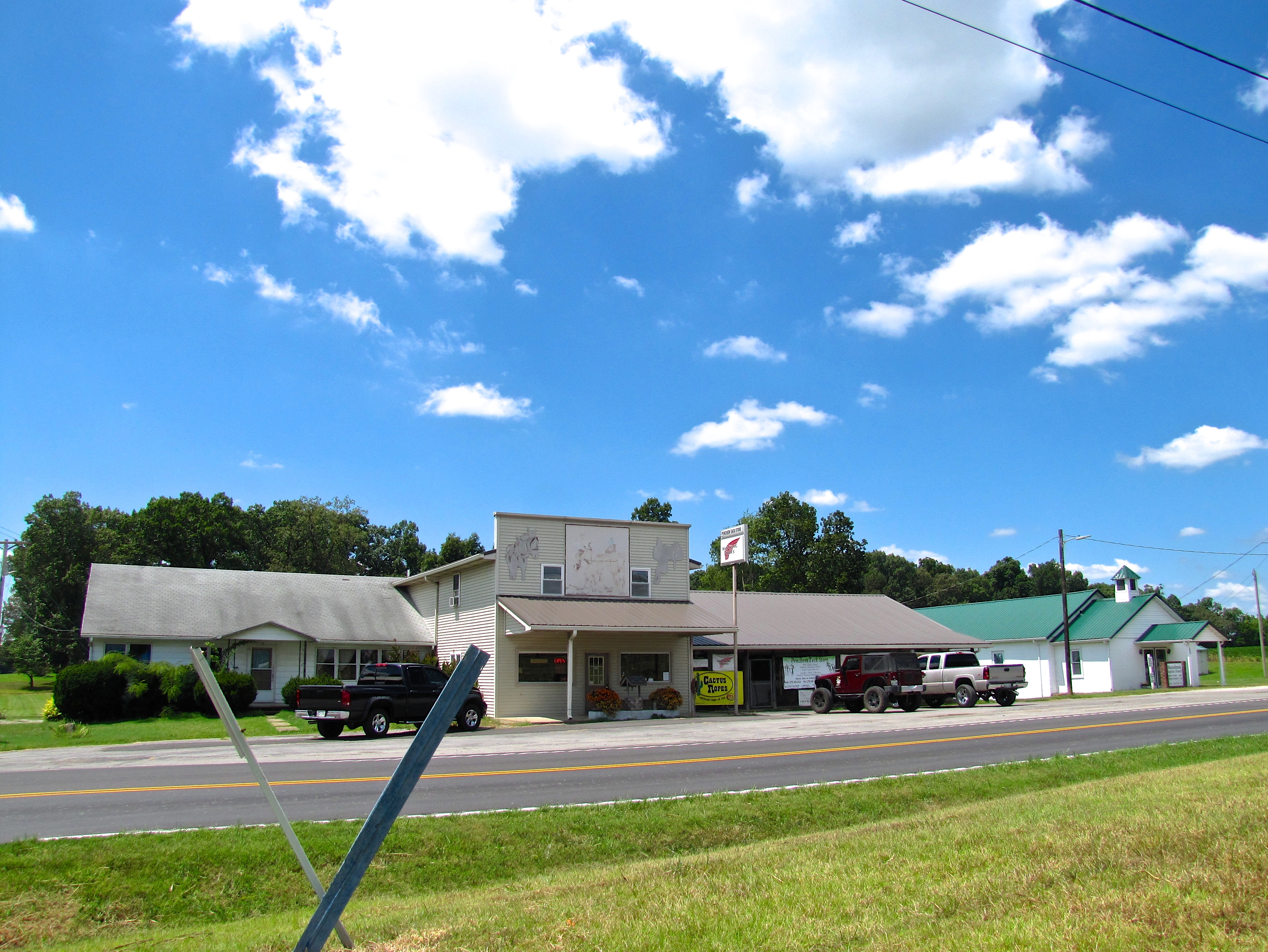
- Businesses along KY 181 in Pinchem

- Location within the state of Kentucky Pinchem (the United States)
- Coordinates: 36°42′10″N 87°11′50″W
- Country: United States
- State: Kentucky
- County: Todd
- Elevation: 607 ft (185 m)
- Time zone: UTC-6 (Central (CST))
  - Summer (DST): UTC-5 (CDT)
- GNIS feature ID: 508821

Pinchem (sometimes spelled "Penchem") is an unincorporated community located in Todd County, Kentucky, United States.

== Geography ==
Pinchem is concentrated around the intersection of Kentucky Route 848 and Kentucky Route 181, southeast of Trenton, and a few miles north of the Kentucky-Tennessee state line.

== History ==
The place was also called Pinchem Slyly in regard to obtaining illegal alcohol.
