= Eagle Way =

Beltway around Hopkinsville, Kentucky, US

Route information
- Length: 16.920 mi (27.230 km)
- Existed: Mid-1970s–present
- History: Completed in 2001
- Component highways: US 68 Byp.; US 68 Truck; KY 1682

Major junctions
- West/North end: KY 107 (Greenville Road) north of Hopkinsville
- For all junctions, see article
- East/South end: US 68 (Jefferson Davis Highway) / KY 80 east of Hopkinsville

Location
- Country: United States
- State: Kentucky

Highway system
- Kentucky State Highway System; Interstate; US; State; Parkways
- United States Numbered Highway System; List; Special; Divided

Eagle Way (also known locally as the Dr. Martin Luther King, Jr. Boulevard or the Hopkinsville Bypass) is a major partial beltway that circles almost completely around the outer portions of the city of Hopkinsville, Kentucky.

== Route description ==
The roadway includes the entire length of the US 68 Bypass and the first 5.894 miles (9.485 km) of Kentucky Route 1682. The road is located entirely in Christian County in western Kentucky.

== History ==
=== As a connector road ===
The bypass originally only consisted of a 5.894 miles (9.485 km) extension of KY 1682 when it was first built at some time between 1973 and 1976. That road began life as a connector from KY 107 to US 41 on the north side of Hopkinsville.

=== Construction of the bypass (1999–2001) ===
Construction of the initial bypass, which was included in a $600 million widening project of US 68 that had proposals dating as early as 1991, went under construction and was completed by 1999. The project also included re-routing the KY 1682 western terminus. The first "new" section went from US 68 on the west side of Hopkinsville to a junction with U.S. Route 41 Alternate on the south side. By the 2000–2001 fiscal year, an extension from US 41 Alternate to another junction with US 68 on the east side of town was constructed and completed.

=== New Interchange ===
In 2011, Eagle Way began providing access to the then-recently extended Pennyrile Parkway, now Interstate 169, which was really completed in 2012 when it was extended all the way to the Interstate 24 corridor in southern Christian County.

=== Future ===
Future plans call for one final extension of the Hopkinsville Bypass that will go through the northeastern side of Hopkinsville going from the KY 107/KY 1682 junction to the pre-existing eastern junction of US 68/KY 80 and US 68 Bypass, thus making it an orbital beltway. This will also involve a new crossroad intersection with Kentucky Route 507 on the east side of town. If it comes into fruition, the target date of completion should be before or in the year 2025. The state highway designation for the final extension will be determined upon completion.

== Major intersections ==
The beltway has intersections with KY 91 and KY 272, along with US 41 Alternate. The beltway crosses the following highways/roads more than once:

- KY 107 (twice)
- Kentucky Route 109 (twice)
- U.S. Route 41 (twice)
- U.S. Route 68 (twice, including the western and eastern terminus of US 68 Byp., and the western terminus of KY 1682)
- Interstate 169 (formerly Pennyrile Parkway) (twice, at exits 6 and 11)
