= Kentucky Route 104 =

State highway in Todd County, Kentucky, United States

Kentucky Route 104
- KY 104 highlighted in red

Route information
- Maintained by KYTC
- Length: 14.305 mi (23.022 km)

Major junctions
- South end: SR 48 at the Kentucky–Tennessee state line
- US 41 in Trenton
- North end: KY 181 near Elkton

Location
- Country: United States
- State: Kentucky
- Counties: Todd

Highway system
- Kentucky State Highway System; Interstate; US; State; Parkways
← KY 103	→ KY 105

Kentucky Route 104 is a 14.305-mile (23.022 km) state highway in southern Todd County, Kentucky.

== Route description ==
KY 104 begins at the Kentucky–Tennessee state line north of Clarksville, where it continues southward as Tennessee State Route 48. From the state line, KY 104 heads on a northeasterly course to Trenton, where it has a brief concurrency with US 41. Leaving Trenton, KY 104 continues northeastward to end at its junction with Kentucky Route 181 just south of Elkton.

== History ==
When Kentucky's state highway system was originally established in 1929, KY 104's current routing was signed as Kentucky Route 181. KY 104 originally went from a junction with U.S. Route 79 at Guthrie to its current northern terminus. That alignment is now part of KY 181, and KY 104 moved to its current alignment at some time between 1939 and 1954.

== Major intersections ==
The entire route is in Todd County.

Location	mi	km	Destinations	Notes
	0.000	0.000	SR 48 south (Trenton Road) to I-24	Southern terminus
	2.855	4.595	KY 1802 north (Hammacksville-Trenton Road) / Watts Road	Southern terminus of KY 1802
Trenton	6.277	10.102	KY 1802 south (Hammacksville-Trenton Road)	Northern terminus of KY 1802
Trenton	6.637	10.681	US 41 south (Guthrie Street) / KY 848 east (Penchem Road)	South end of US 41 overlap; western terminus of KY 848
Trenton	6.696	10.776	US 41 north (North Main Street)	North end of US 41 overlap
	10.153	16.340	KY 1753 east (Elkton-Trenton Road)	Western terminus of KY 1753
	14.305	23.022	KY 181 (Guthrie Road)	Northern terminus
1.000 mi = 1.609 km; 1.000 km = 0.621 mi
