= Kentucky Route 1683 =

Former state route in Kentucky, United States

Kentucky Route 1683

Route information
- Maintained by KYTC
- Length: 1.4 mi (2.3 km)

Major junctions
- West end: Clays Mill Road in Lexington
- East end: US 27 in Lexington

Location
- Country: United States
- State: Kentucky
- Counties: Fayette

Highway system
- Kentucky State Highway System; Interstate; US; State; Parkways
← KY 1682	→ KY 1684

Kentucky Route 1683 (KY 1683) was a former state highway that ran from Clays Mill Road to US 27 (Nicholasville Road) in Lexington, Kentucky. Its former routing was from the entrance of Jessie M. Clark Middle School and followed along what is now Vincent Way to West Reynolds Road. In 1999, a new four-lane urban arterial opened from Clays Mill to the Norfolk Southern Railway underpass; this included a new traffic circle with Keithshire Way, the first in the city. Part of the old West Reynolds Road was renamed Vincent Way.

== History ==
Ownership transferred from the Kentucky Transportation Cabinet to the city of Lexington on June 9, 1999.

== Major intersections ==
The entire route is in Lexington, Fayette County.

mi	km	Destinations	Notes
0.0	0.0	Clays Mill Road	
1.4	2.3	US 27 (Nicholasville Road)	
1.000 mi = 1.609 km; 1.000 km = 0.621 mi

== See also ==
- Roads of Lexington, Kentucky
