= Kentucky Route 107 =

State highway in Kentucky, United States

Kentucky Route 107
- KY 107 highlighted in red

Route information
- Maintained by KYTC
- Length: 56.907 mi (91.583 km)
- Existed: 1929–present

Major junctions
- South end: Angels Road and Artillery Road in Rural Christian County
- US 68 Byp. (Eagle Way) south side of Hopkinsville US 41 / US 68 / KY 80 in Hopkinsville; KY 189 in Fearsville KY 181 in Clifty
- North end: US 431 in Lewisburg

Location
- Country: United States
- State: Kentucky
- Counties: Christian, Logan, Todd

Highway system
- Kentucky State Highway System; Interstate; US; State; Parkways
← KY 106	→ KY 108

Kentucky Route 107 (KY 107) is a 56.907-mile-long (91.583 km) east–west state highway in west–central Kentucky. The western (southern) terminus of the route is an "end of state maintenance" terminus near the Fort Campbell military reservation south of Donaldson Creek near La Fayette, and its northern (eastern) terminus is at an intersection with U.S. Route 431 (US 431) in Lewisburg.

== Route description ==
=== Christian County ===
KY 107's southern terminus is located just south of the Christian County community of LaFayette, near an entrance to the Fort Campbell Military Reservation, falling just short of the Tennessee state line. The highway starts its course as LaFayette Road from there until downtown Hopkinsville. The highway's first 10 miles (16 km) go through mainly rural areas of southern Christian County, with intersections at KY 117 at Herndon, and KY 345 at Beverly. At mile marker 10.8, KY 107 crosses over I-24 via an overpass. It enters the city of Hopkinsville after crossing the US 68 Bypass/US 68 Truck Route.

In downtown Hopkinsville, KY 107 joins the eastbound lanes of the actual alignment of US 41/US 68, KY 80, and (within downtown only) KY 109. It follows US 41/US 68 and KY 80/KY 109 until it reaches Campbell Street. KY 107 turns off on Campbell Street, and makes a right turn onto East 7th Street. It then goes over I-169 (the Edward T. Breathitt Pennyrile Parkway), and then makes a turn to the north-northeast at an intersection with KY 507 (Pilot Rock Road).

It leaves town after the junction with KY 1682, the Hopkinsville Bypass. KY 107 then goes through the communities of Fearsville, where it crosses KY 189.

=== Todd and Logan Counties ===
After exiting Fearsville, KY 107 enters the northern segment of Todd County near Kirkmansville where it meets KY 171. It then gets co-signed with KY 181 at Clifty. The co-signing of the two state routes lasts for two miles (3.2 km). KY 107 after separating from KY 181 is known as Todd-Deer Lick Road, and becomes known simply as Deer Lick Road upon entry into Logan County. The junction with KY 1293 at Deer Lick provides access to Lake Malone. KY 107 ends at Lewisburg, where it intersects with US 431 during that route's section that is co-signed with KY 106.

== History ==
Until the Fort Campbell Military Reservation was established in 1942, KY 107's southern/western terminus was at the Tennessee state line in the southeastern-most corner of Trigg County. The southern terminus was truncated to the intersection with Angels Road when the military base was opened.

KY 107's northern/eastern terminus was originally in Kirkmansville until the mid-1940s, when it was extended to Clifty via a former alignment of KY 181 in that area. The roadway between Clifty and Lewisburg was undesignated until KY 107 was extended onto that road in the mid-1950s.

== Major intersections ==
County	Location	mi	km	Destinations	Notes
Christian	Fort Campbell	0.000	0.000	Artillery Road / Patton Road	Southern (western) terminus
Christian		4.610	7.419	KY 287 north (Binns Mill Road)	Southern terminus of KY 287
Christian	Herndon	8.246	13.271	KY 117 (Gracey Herndon Road) – Gracey, Oak Grove	
Christian	Beverly	10.706	17.230	KY 345 south (Palmyra Road)	Southern end of KY 345 Concurrency
Christian		12.566	20.223	KY 345 north (Huffman Mill Road)	Northern end of KY 345 concurrency
Christian	Hopkinsville	15.681	25.236	US 68 Byp. (Eagle Way) to US 68 Truck (Dr. Martin Luther King Jr. Blvd.) / I-169	
Christian	Hopkinsville	17.169	27.631	KY 380 (Country Club Lane)	
Christian	Hopkinsville	18.394	29.602	KY 695 south (South Main St.)	KY 695 accessible on KY 107 SB only
Christian	Hopkinsville	18.640	29.998	KY 272 west (14th Street)	Eastern terminus of KY 272
Christian	Hopkinsville	18.834	30.310	US 41 north (9th Street) / US 68 west / KY 80 west / KY 109 north / KY 107 south – Cadiz, Dawson Springs, Madisonville, Pennyrile Forest State Resort Park	Western end of US 41/US 68/KY 80/KY109 concurrency
Christian	Hopkinsville	18.954	30.504	KY 2544 south (South Clay Street)	One-way street
Christian	Hopkinsville	19.014	30.600	KY 2544 north (South Liberty Street)	One-way street
Christian	Hopkinsville	19.073	30.695	US 68 east (9th Street) / KY 80 east / US 41 south / KY 109 south to I-169 – Elkton, Pembroke	Eastern end of US41/US 68/KY80/KY109 concurrency
Christian	Hopkinsville	19.781– 19.835	31.834– 31.921	Bridge over I-169 (former Pennyrile Parkway) and its Exit 9 SB off-ramp Access is denied	
Christian	Hopkinsville	20.083	32.320	KY 507 east (East 7th Street)	Western terminus of KY 507
Christian	Hopkinsville	21.881	35.214	KY 1682 west (Dr. Martin Luther King Jr. Way/Eagle Way) to I-169	Southern end of KY 1682 concurrency
Christian		22.203	35.732	KY 1682 east (Antioch Church Road)	Northern end of KY 1682 concurrency
Christian	Fearsville	30.527	49.128	KY 189 north (North Greenville Road)	Western end of KY 189 concurrency
Christian	Fearsville	30.590	49.230	KY 189 south (Ovil Road)	Eastern end of KY 189 concurrency
Christian		31.387	50.512	KY 800 west (Coal Creek Road)	Eastern terminus of KY800
Todd	Kirkmansville	34.951	56.248	KY 171 (Allegre Road) – Greenville, Allegre	
Todd	Clifty	40.658	65.433	KY 181 south (Greenville Road) – Elkton	Western end of KY 181 concurrency
Todd	Clifty	41.412	66.646	KY 890 north (Rabbit Ridge Road)	
Todd		42.659	68.653	KY 181 north (Greenville Road) – Greenville	Eastern end of KY 181 concurrency
Logan		48.526	78.095	KY 1293 north (Dunmor-Deer Lick Road) – Lake Malone, Dunmor	Southern terminus of KY 1293
Logan	Lewisburg	54.146	87.140	US 431 (Main Street) / KY 106 – Central City, Russellville	Northern (eastern) terminus
1.000 mi = 1.609 km; 1.000 km = 0.621 mi: Concurrency terminus; Incomplete access
