= Clifty, Kentucky =

Unincorporated community in Kentucky, United States

- Unincorporated community
- Location within Kentucky
- Coordinates: 36°59′43″N 87°08′52″W
- Country: United States
- State: Kentucky
- County: Todd
- Elevation: 810 ft (250 m)
- Time zone: UTC-6 (Central (CST))
  - Summer (DST): UTC-5 (CDT)
- ZIP code: 42216
- Area code: 270
- GNIS feature ID: 489678

Clifty, formerly called Lickskillet, is an unincorporated community in Todd County, Kentucky, United States.

== Geography ==
Clifty is located in the northern portion of Todd County at the junction of Kentucky Routes 107, 181, and 890. The community is located about 12.8 miles (20.6 km) north of Elkton.

== Post office ==
Clifty has a post office with ZIP code 42216.
