= Herndon, Kentucky =

Unincorporated community in Kentucky, United States

Coordinates: 36°44′01″N 87°33′55″W

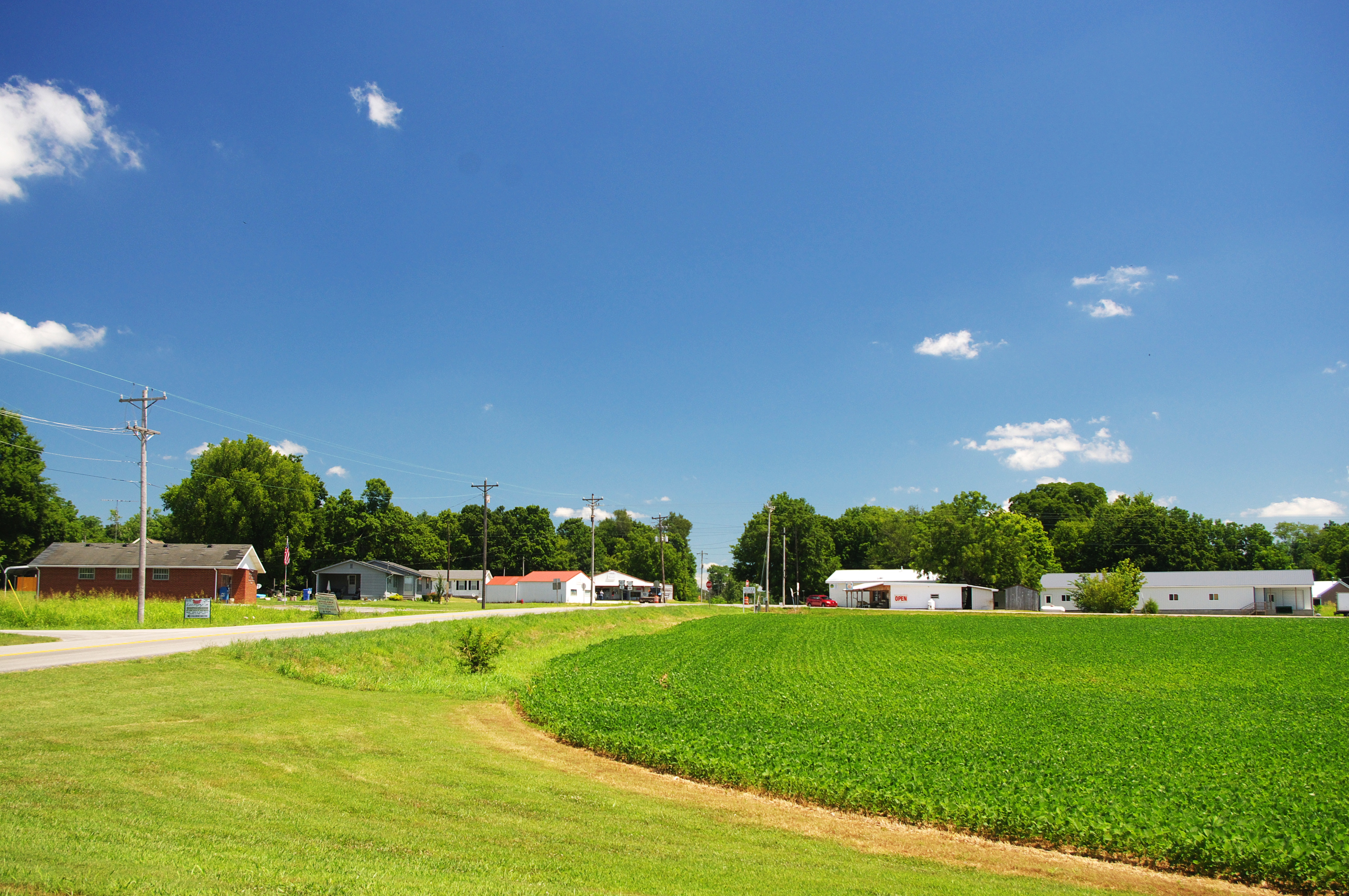
Herndon

Herndon is an unincorporated community located in Christian County, Kentucky, United States. It is concentrated around the intersection of Kentucky Route 107 and Kentucky Route 117, southwest of Hopkinsville. It has a post office with zip code 42236.

== History ==
Herndon had its start when the railroad was extended to that point. The community has the name of Capt. Tom Herndon, a local merchant. A post office has been in operation at Herndon since 1886.
