= John James Audubon State Park =

- U.S. National Register of Historic Places
- U.S. Historic district
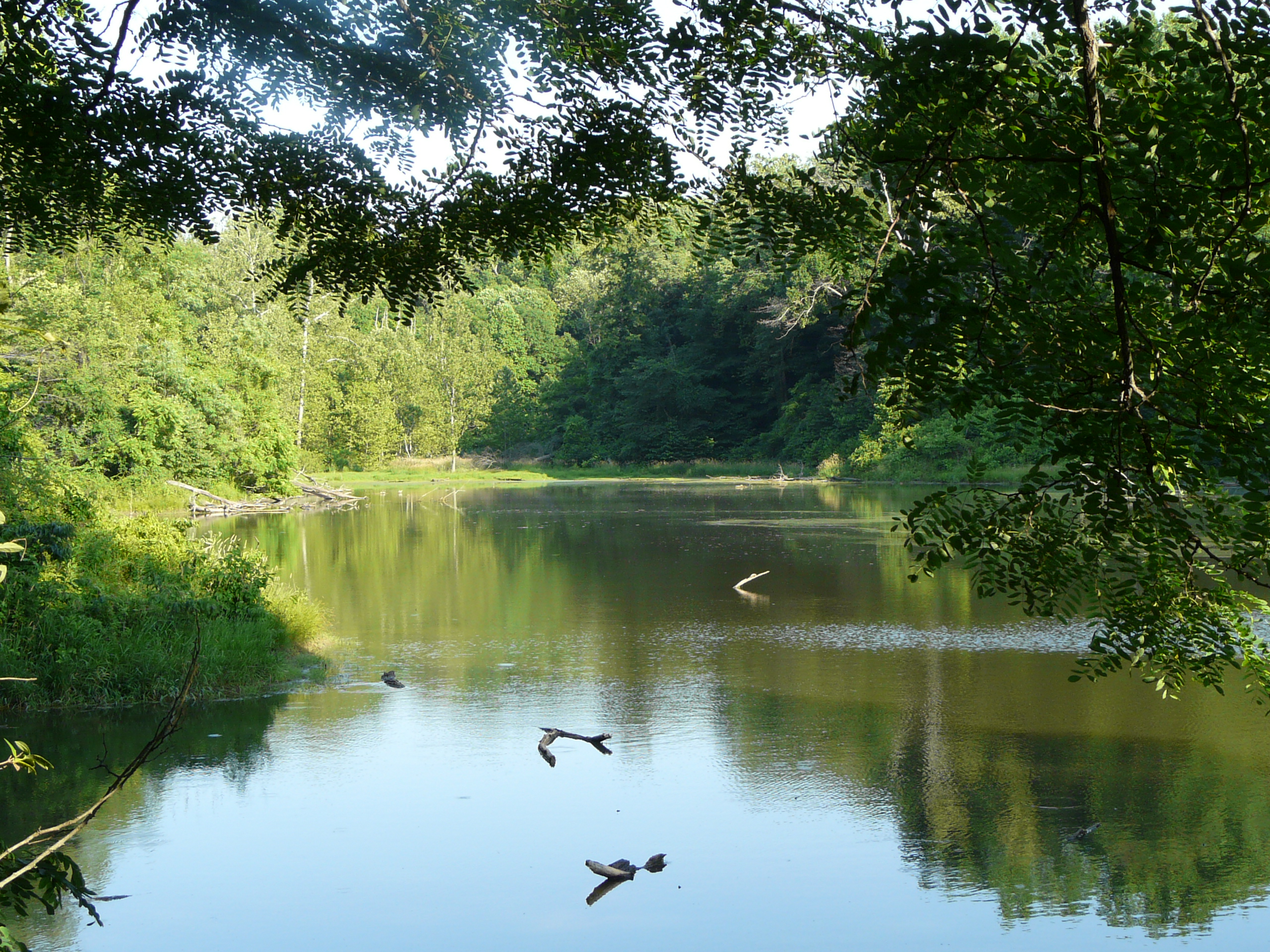
- Wilderness Lake at Audubon State Park.

- Location within Kentucky Location within the United States
- Location: US 41, Henderson, Kentucky
- Coordinates: 37°52′56″N 87°32′53″W
- Area: about 575 acres (2.33 km^{2})
- Built: 1934
- Architect: Donald Corley; Bernard Alves
- Architectural style: Late 19th and 20th Century Revivals, Norman Revival
- NRHP reference No.: 87002220
- Added to NRHP: March 10, 1988

John James Audubon State Park is located on U. S. Route 41 in Henderson, Kentucky, just south of the Ohio River. Its inspiration is John James Audubon, the ornithologist, naturalist, and painter who resided in Henderson from 1810 to 1819 when Henderson was a frontier village.

The park was listed on the National Register of Historic Places in 1988. Most of the park has been dedicated as a state nature preserve by the Office of Kentucky Nature Preserves, which also added a 650-acre addition in 2016 through its Kentucky Heritage Land Conservation Fund program.

== History ==
John James Audubon operated small businesses in Henderson, Kentucky with mixed success, but his passion was exploring the forests of the region and sketching and painting wildlife, particularly birds.

In 1934, the Wolf Hills area in Henderson was selected for a new state park (meeting the minimum 300 acres needed for park development). Susan Towles, a Henderson librarian, supplied the necessary research and documentation to establish a historic connection to the land and Audubon.

In September 1934, a Civilian Conservation Corps (CCC) base Camp Cromwell (named in honor of the Director of the Kentucky State Parks, Emma Guy Cromwell) was established off US 41 near John James Audubon State Park. After the 300-acres was procured for park development, approximately 200 CCC, Company 1540 employees were dispatched from their West Virginia base to Henderson where they were joined by others including several Henderson natives. Over the next four years the CCC drained swamps, build two lakes and developed trails and roads. With the help of the Works Progress Administration (WPA), the park shelters, the Tea House (presently the park office), and the Audubon Museum were constructed from local stone and mill work. The entire project cost approximately $500,000.

Progress on the park was not always smooth. There were long delays caused by lack of funds and disagreements over the park's focus. Henderson attorney and businessman Gibney Oscar Letcher helped guide the project along; working among the CCC, WPA, National Park Service, Kentucky Department of Parks, local contractors and suppliers, the Audubon Park Committee and the Audubon family descendants.

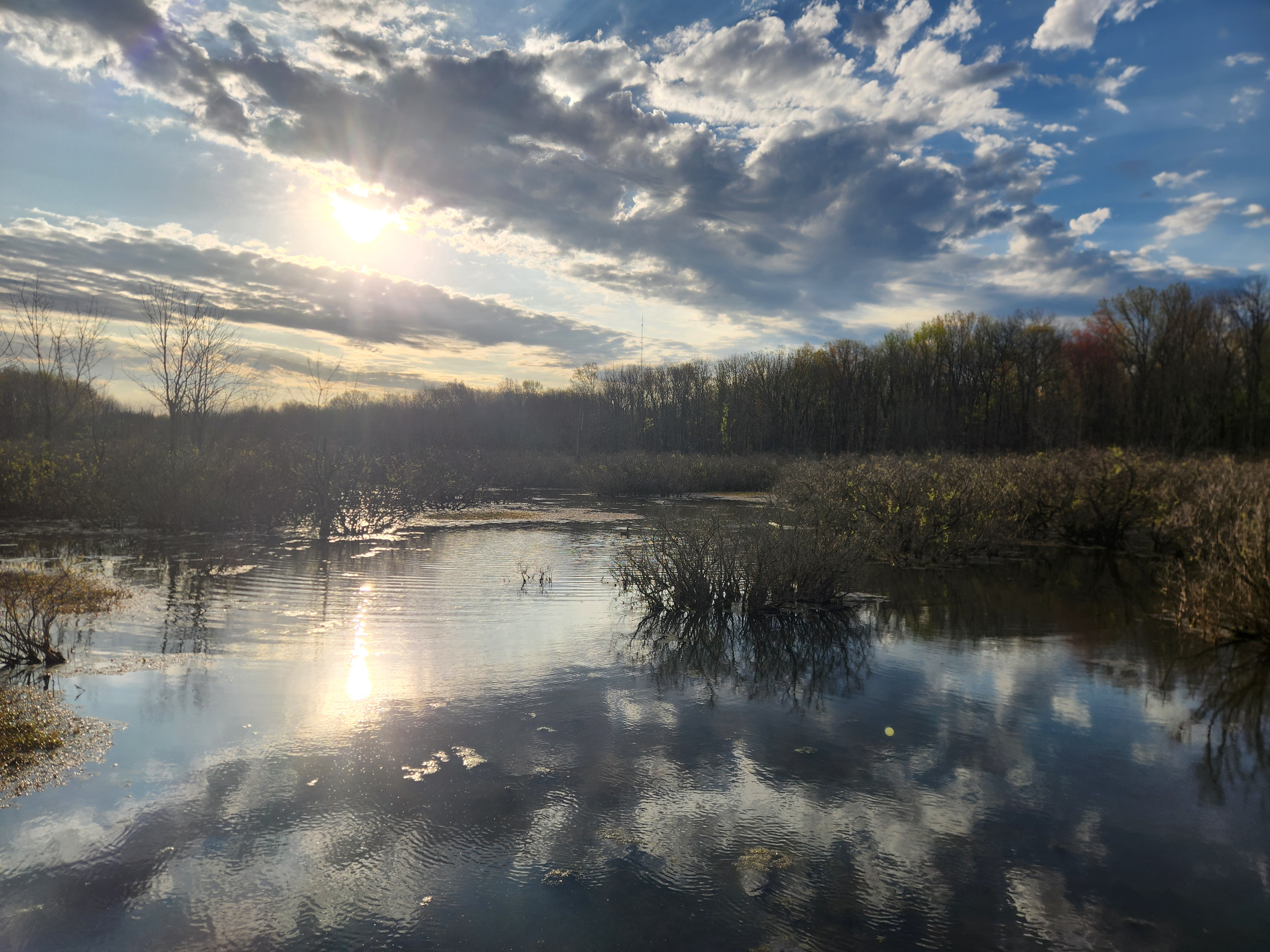
John James Audubon State Park Wetlands Trail

The Wilderness Lake was completed in the spring of 1938 but the work continued slowly on the Tea House and gardens, the recreational lake, the roads and the cottages. The Tea House was completed in June 1940 and served three meals daily until December 1941. In the spring of 1941, the cottages were completed and the recreational lake was excavated and filled. That completed the work under the federal New Deal programs.

After the attack on Pearl Harbor, December 7, 1941, Kentucky and the nation prepared for war. Camp Cromwell was converted into a Naval Cadet Aviation Training School during the war and supervised by Evansville College (presently the University of Evansville).

After WWII, attention returned to John James Audubon State Park. Beginning in 1948 and lasting until 1955, a program of restoration and construction was carried out. Some of the projects completed were new museum lighting installation; picnic area, bathhouse and beach, landscaping, parking, lake dam and shelter construction. From 1960 to 1969 another $500,000 was invested in the park with construction of a camping area and nine-hole golf course. Additional land was acquired bringing the park to nearly 700 acres. New picnic shelters and employee housing were also constructed.

In 1990 the state General Assembly allocated $2.5 million for a thorough renovation of the museum and the additional 9,500-square-foot (880 m^{2}) nature center to promote the study of nature. In the spring of 1992, the largest renovation in the museum's 54-year history began and in December 1993 the refurbished and expanded museum reopened.

== Audubon Museum ==
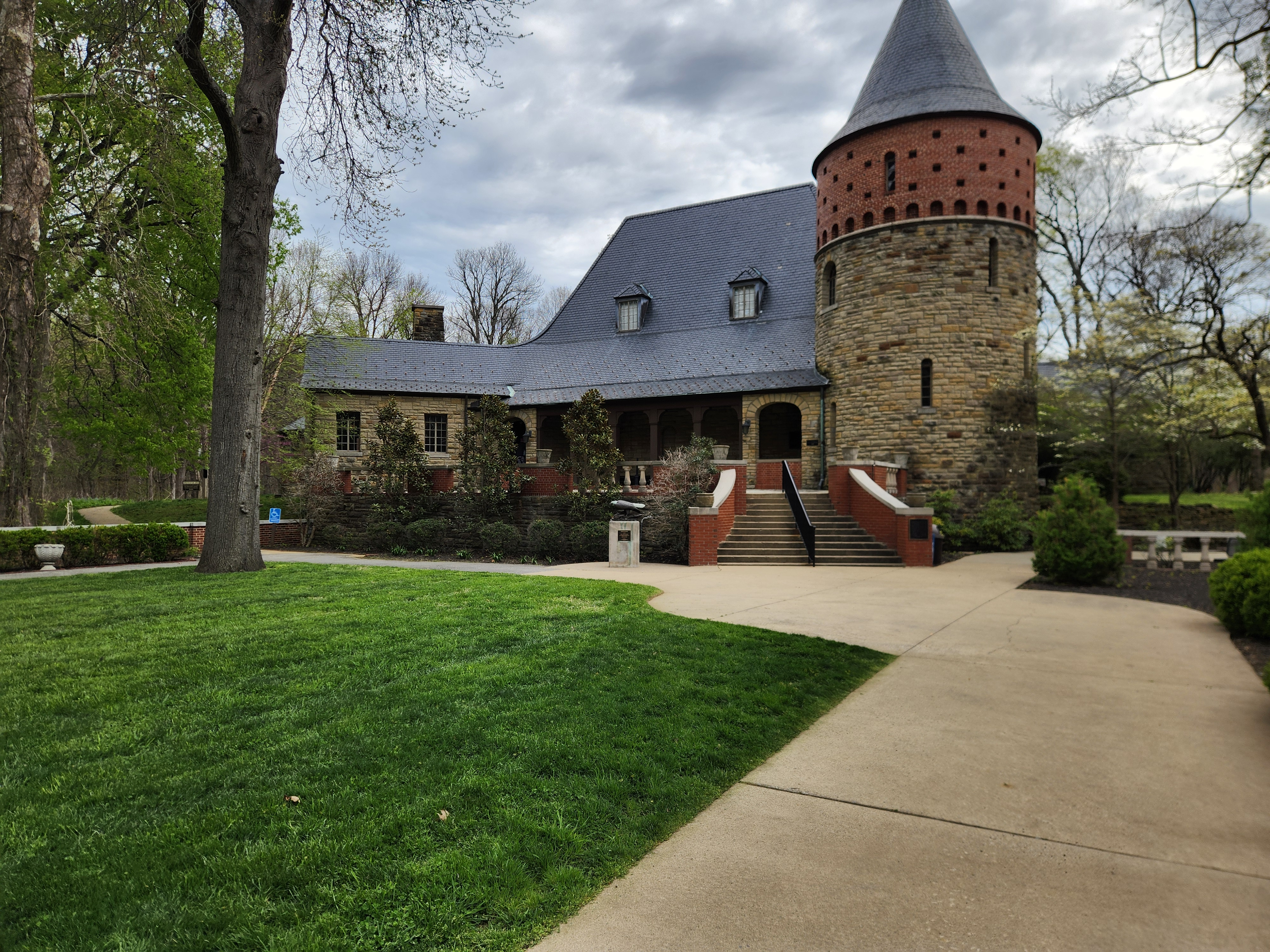
Museum at John James Audubon State Park

The museum design is French heritage. The style also permitted the inclusion of small niches in the museum tower for nesting birds.

Alice Tyler, widow of J. J. Audubon's great-grandson, Leonard Sanford Tyler, had been in contact with Susan Towles during the park's development. It was her wish that the large personal collection of Audubon material in her possession be placed on loan in the new Audubon Museum. Mrs. Tyler shipped her collection to Henderson in the spring of 1938 and the museum opened July 16, 1938.

The Tyler collection was later purchased in 1994 through numerous donations made to the Friends of Audubon, as well as contributions from the Preston Foundation and the Kentucky State Parks.

Today, the museum displays one of the world's largest collections of original Audubon art that made the wildlife artist a legend. But it is the personal artifacts and memorabilia that portray the often difficult life of Audubon. The museum's four exhibit halls chronicle Audubon's life, including his 1810–1819 residence in Henderson, Kentucky. Highlights of the collection include the American Bald Eagle oil, a four-volume edition of the Birds of America, a personal seal, handwritten journals, the silver service Audubon sent from England to his wife, Lucy (replacing the service set that was lost during bankruptcy).

== Description ==
Audubon Park consists of approximately 700 acres (2.8 km^{2}), primarily hilly forests that include 338-acre (1.4 km^{2}) dedicated by the Office of Kentucky Nature Preserves with old-growth trees and trails.

Highlights include the internationally acclaimed Audubon Museum that features numerous valuable examples of Audubon art as well as a gift shop and nature center; a nine-hole golf course; six cottages; a 69-acre (280,000 m^{2}) campground that accommodates tents and campers; a 28-acre (110,000 m^{2}) manmade fishing lake with rental pedal boats; 6.5 miles (10.5 km) of forest hiking trails; tennis courts; four picnic shelters; and playground. (Note: This is 1 of 3 state parks in Kentucky that was in the path of totality during the 2024 total solar eclipse.)

A variety of year-round, interpretive programs are conducted under the direction of a full-time naturalist and museum educator. Programs focus on art history, as well as native plants, animals, conservation and recycling.

Audubon Park receives local support from a not-for-profit organization, the Friends of Audubon.
