= Kentucky Route 1682 =

State highway in Kentucky, United States

Kentucky Route 1682
- KY 1682 highlighted in red

Route information
- Maintained by KYTC
- Length: 15.295 mi (24.615 km)

Major junctions
- West end: US 68 / KY 80 / US 68 Byp. near Hopkinsville
- US 41 near Hopkinsville I-169 near Hopkinsville KY 107 near Hopkinsville
- East end: KY 189 near Fearsville

Location
- Country: United States
- State: Kentucky
- Counties: Christian

Highway system
- Kentucky State Highway System; Interstate; US; State; Parkways
← KY 1681	→ KY 1683

Kentucky Route 1682 (KY 1682) is an east–west state highway that traverses central and eastern Christian County in western Kentucky. It is 15.295 miles (24.615 km) long.

== Route description ==
KY 1682 begins on the west side of Hopkinsville as the Hopkinsville By-Pass north of U.S. Route 68 (US 68). It originates at the crossroads of US 68/KY 80, the US 68 By-Pass south of the main route, and itself.

KY 1682 bypasses the northern outskirts of Hopkinsville, intersecting KY 91 and KY 109, as well as US 41 and I-169. The bypass ends at a junction with KY 107, but KY 1682 turns onto KY 107 for about 0.32 miles (0.51 km) before turning off.

KY 1682 continues northeast of Hopkinsville as Antioch Church Road, going parallel to KY 107, and it terminates at a junction with KY 189 just southeast of Fearsville.

Together, with US 68 Bypass, it creates a partial beltway around Hopkinsville.

== Major intersections ==
The entire route is in Christian County.

Location	mi	km	Destinations	Notes
	0.000	0.000	US 68 / KY 80 (Cadiz Road) / US 68 Byp. east (Eagle Way)	Western terminus; western terminus of US 68 Byp.
Hopkinsville	1.848	2.974	KY 91 (Princeton Road)	
Hopkinsville	2.437	3.922	KY 109 (Dawson Springs Road)	
Hopkinsville	4.288	6.901	US 41 (North Main Street / Madisonville Road)	West end of US 41 Truck overlap; northern terminus of US 41 Truck
Hopkinsville	4.973	8.003	I-169 / US 41 Truck south to I-24 – Madisonville, Henderson, Nashville	East end of US 41 Truck overlap; I-169 exit 11
	5.894	9.485	KY 107 south (Greenville Road)	West end of KY 107 overlap
	6.216	10.004	KY 107 north (Greenville Road)	East end of KY 107 overlap
	15.295	24.615	KY 189 (Ovil Road)	Eastern terminus
1.000 mi = 1.609 km; 1.000 km = 0.621 mi: Concurrency terminus
