= Midland, Kentucky =

Unincorporated community in Kentucky, United States

- Unincorporated community
- Location within Kentucky Location within the United States
- Coordinates: 37°18′21″N 87°13′50″W
- Country: United States
- State: Kentucky
- County: Muhlenberg
- Elevation: 476 ft (145 m)
- Time zone: UTC-6 (Central (CST))
  - Summer (DST): UTC-5 (CST)
- GNIS feature ID: 508599

Midland is an unincorporated community located in Muhlenberg County, Kentucky, United States.
