= Longview, Louisville =

Neighborhood in Louisville, Kentucky

Coordinates: 38°17′57″N 85°39′32″W

Longview is a neighborhood of Louisville, Kentucky located along Longview and Box Hill Lanes off River Road, and is near Route 60.
