= U.S. Route 41 =

Highway in the United States

U.S. Route 41
- US 41 highlighted in red

Route information
- Length: 2,008 mi (3,232 km)
- Existed: November 11, 1926–present

Major junctions
- South end: US 1 in Miami, FL
- I-95 in Miami, FL; I-10 near Lake City, FL; I-75 at Atlanta, GA; I-24 at Chattanooga, TN; I-40 / I-65 at Nashville, TN; I-64 / I-69 at Evansville, IN; I-70 / US 40 at Terre Haute, IN; I-80 / I-94 / US 6 at Hammond, IN; I-55 at Chicago, IL; I-43 / I-94 at Milwaukee, WI
- North end: Ft. Wilkins State Park near Copper Harbor, MI

Location
- Country: United States
- States: Florida, Georgia, Tennessee, Kentucky, Indiana, Illinois, Wisconsin, Michigan

Highway system
- United States Numbered Highway System; List; Special; Divided
← US 40	→ US 42

U.S. Route 41, also U.S. Highway 41 (US 41), is a major north–south United States Numbered Highway that runs from Miami, Florida, to the Upper Peninsula of Michigan. Until 1949, the part in southern Florida, from Naples to Miami, was US 94. The highway's southern terminus is in the Brickell neighborhood of Downtown Miami at an intersection with Brickell Avenue (US 1), and its northern terminus is east of Copper Harbor, Michigan, at a modest cul-de-sac near Fort Wilkins Historic State Park at the tip of the Keweenaw Peninsula. US 41 is closely paralleled by Interstate 75 (I-75) from Naples, Florida, all the way through Georgia to Chattanooga, Tennessee.

== Route description ==
Lengths
	mi	km
FL	483	777
GA	378	608
TN	197	317
KY	104	167
IN	279	449
IL	62	100
WI	226	364
MI	279	449
Total	2,008	3,232

=== Florida ===
In Florida, US 41 is paralleled by Interstate 75 all the way from Miami to Georgia (on the northern border), and I-75 has largely supplanted US 41 as a major highway.

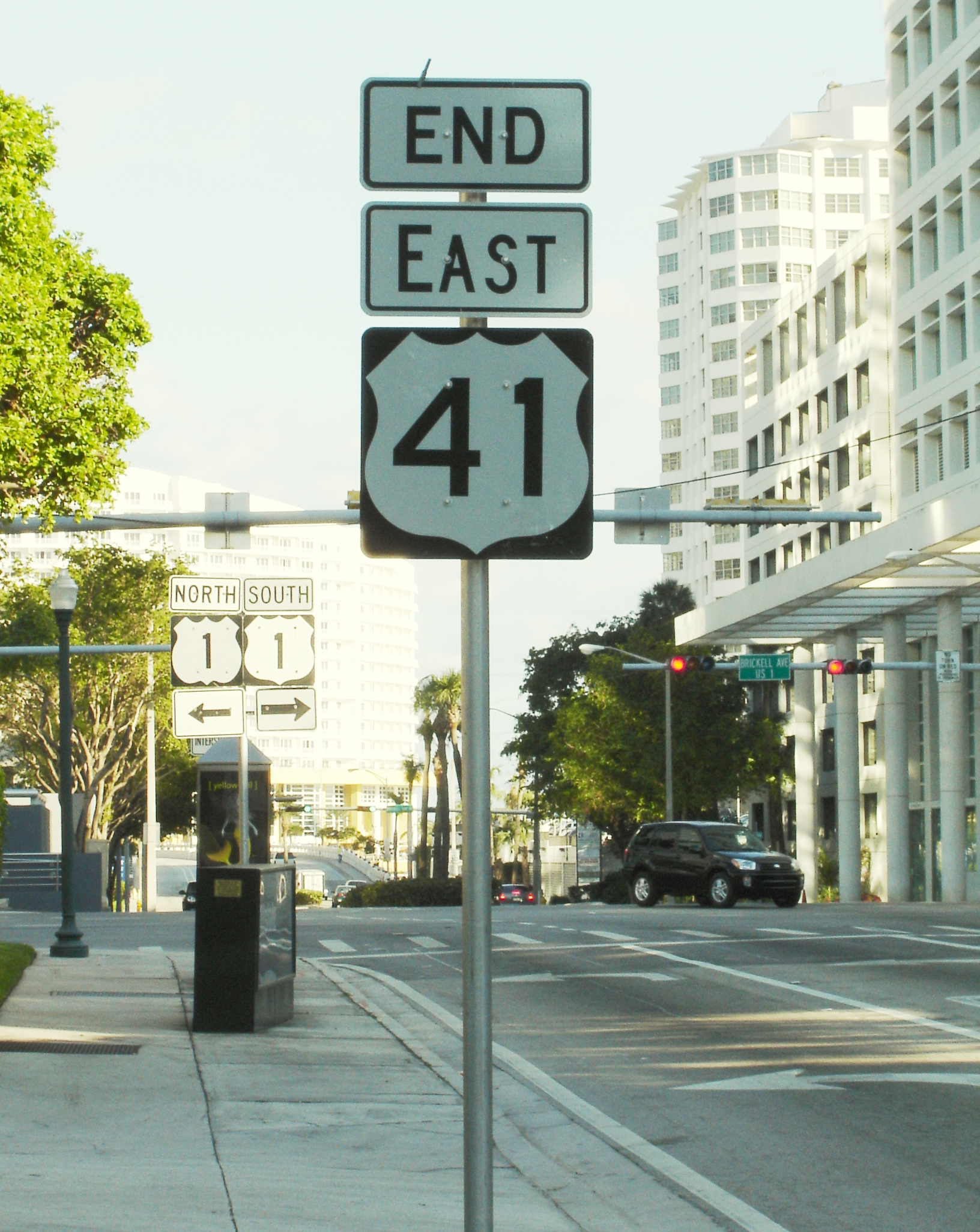
Southern terminus of US 41 at Brickell Avenue in Miami in January 2006

Between Miami and Naples, US 41 is signed east–west and cuts across the Florida peninsula, running through the vast Everglades wilderness. This section has been designated a National Scenic Byway. The byway runs east–west through the Big Cypress National Preserve, skirting the northern border of the Everglades National Park for about 20 miles (32 km). The part of the highway between Tampa and Miami is known as the Tamiami Trail (derived from the combination of the names of the road's two termini, Tampa and Miami), thus, this section of the road is commonly known as the East Trail, as it runs east–west across the state, in contrast to the road's otherwise distinctively north–south route. In Naples, Route 41 changes direction at an intersection with 5th Avenue in Downtown Naples, turning from west to north towards Tampa (or from south to east towards Miami).

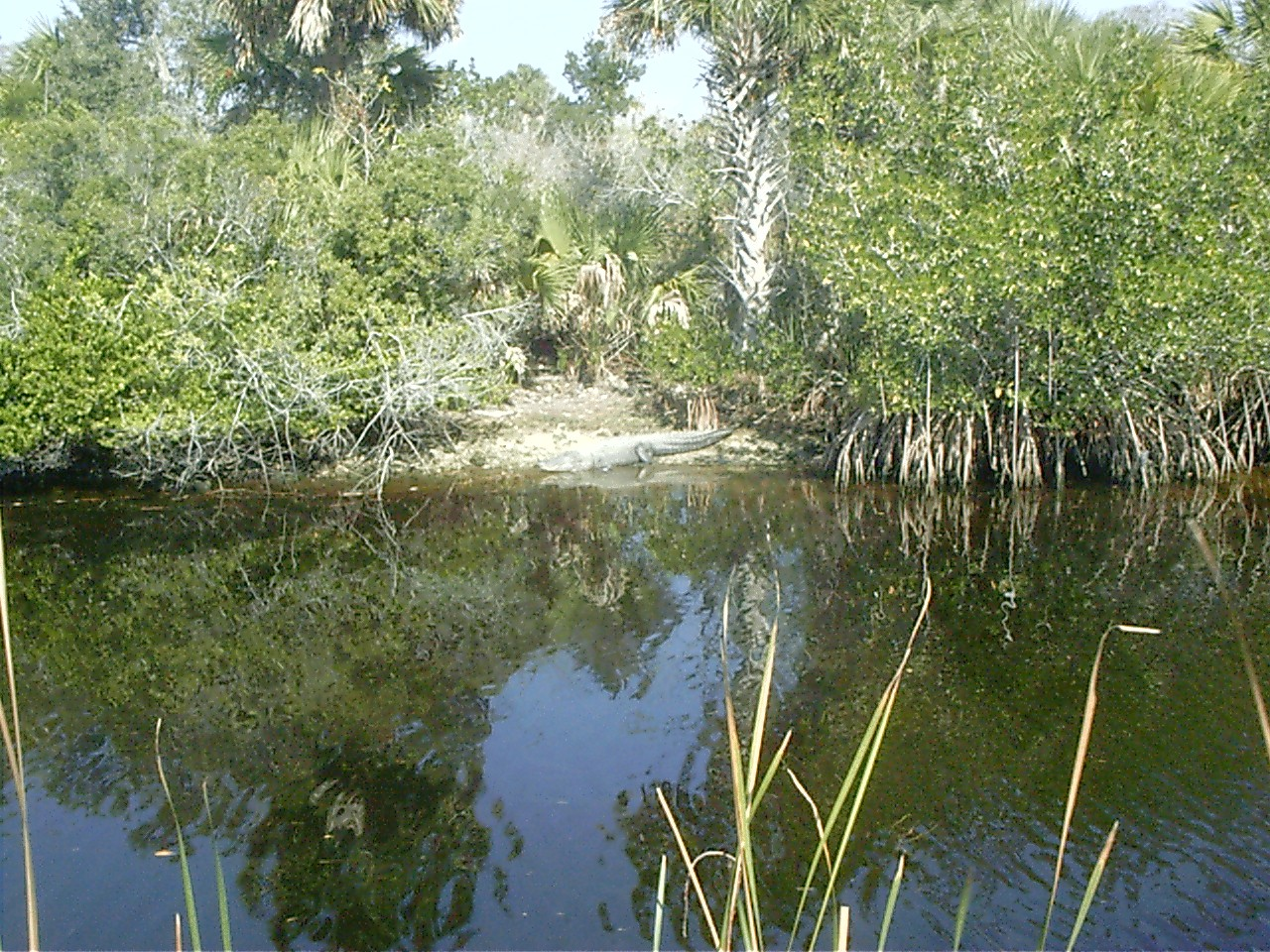
Alligators are a common sight along the scenic Tamiami Trail from Miami to Naples. Unlike the parallel road, Alligator Alley, the trail is only one lane in each direction, and it has no fences to keep wildlife from crossing it.

As the Trail moves into Hillsborough County the historic communities of Ruskin, Florida and Gibsonton, Florida are south Hillsborough County high points. Ruskin was founded by the Commongood Society. Highway 41 from Ruskin's Little Manatee River to Big Bend Rd (CR 672) has been designated by the Florida Senate as the Trooper Kenneth E. Flynt Highway in Memory of Florida Trooper Flynt who was killed in the line of duty. Gibsonton was populated by carnival workers.

US 41 is in the process of being widened throughout the northern Tampa Bay suburbs. It is currently six lanes wide between Tampa, Lutz, and much of Land o' Lakes, and again between Garden Grove and Brooksville. It is also four lanes wide in Tampa south of BUS US 41, between a section north of Land o' Lakes, Masaryktown, and Garden Grove, and south of Inverness. A large portion of US 41 is co-designated along the unmarked State Road 45 between Belle Meade and High Springs.

From US 92 in Tampa to US 41 Business and State Road 676 near the unincorporated Palm River-Clair Mel, US 41 carries the unsigned State Road 599 designation. It contains the northern end of the Tamiami Trail at the SR 60 intersection. It is normally three lanes wide, but between Interstate 4 and the northern terminus of SR 569 it is only two lanes wide. The unsigned state highway is 5.6 miles (9.0 km) long. At the northern terminus, US 41 turns west. (If one continues straight, 40th Street leads to Busch Gardens Tampa.) Major intersections include State Road 574, SR 569, I-4, SR 60, and the Lee Roy Selmon Expressway (SR 618).

In Northern Florida, US 41 runs along the DeSoto Trail between Floral City and Williston and again between High Springs, and Lake City.

=== Georgia ===
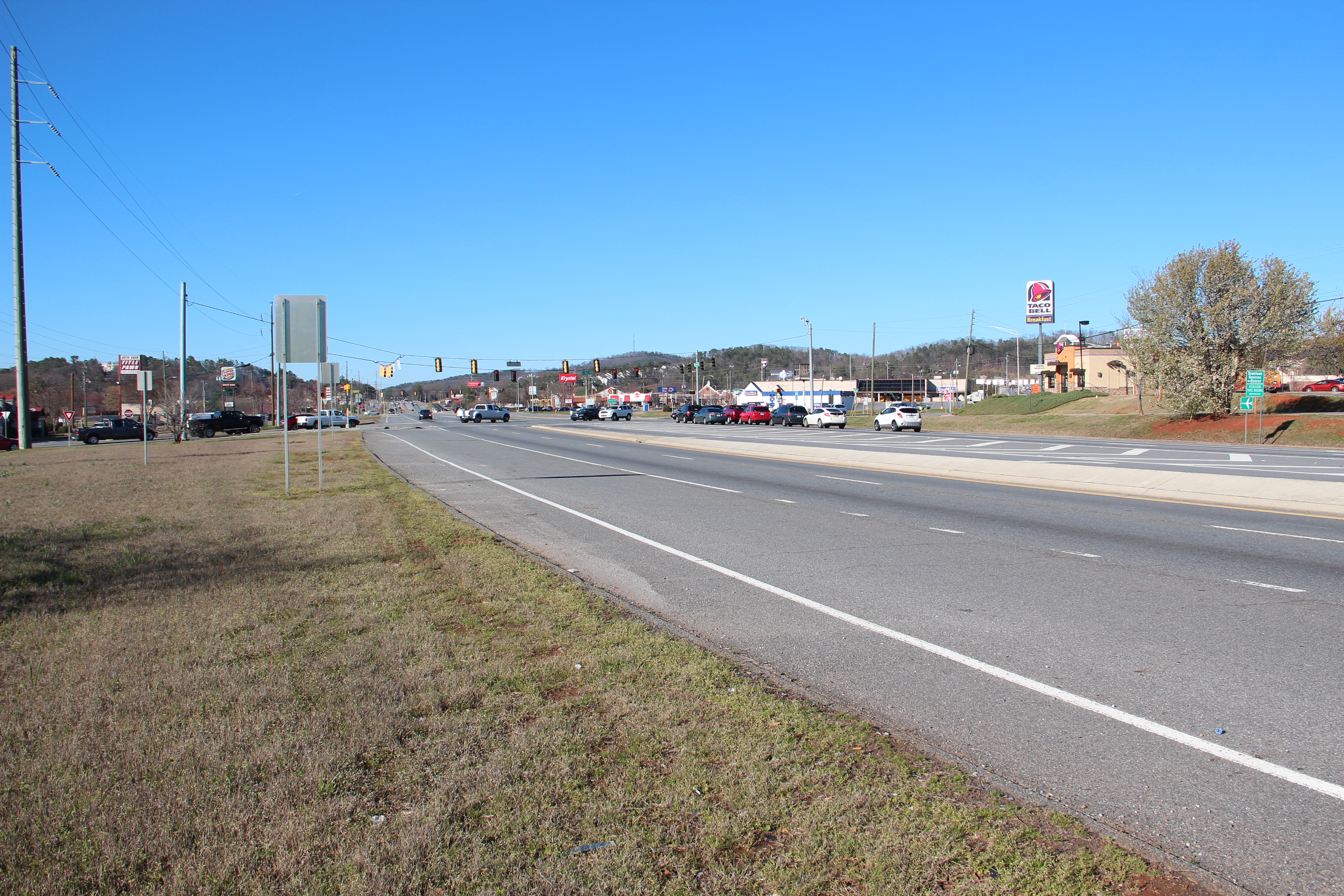
U.S. Route 41 in Cartersville

In Georgia, US 41 is paralleled by Interstate 75 all the way from Florida to Tennessee, and I-75 has largely supplanted US 41 as a major highway.

The first major city in Georgia north of Florida is Valdosta, and the primary US 41 has been rerouted to run along Inner Perimeter Road around Valdosta; there is a business route through Valdosta. The highway follows I-75 north of Valdosta from exit 22 to exit 29.

The highway proceeds through South and Central Georgia cities and towns including Adel, Tifton, Cordele, Unadilla, Perry, Warner Robins, Macon, Barnesville, and Griffin as it approaches the Atlanta metropolitan area. The Atlanta Motor Speedway is located on US 19 and US 41 in Hampton, south of Atlanta. Tara Boulevard and Metropolitan Parkway carry the highway, along with its co-signed partner US 19, north into the city. In Hapeville, just outside Atlanta, the highway serves the northeastern part of Hartsfield–Jackson Atlanta International Airport, passing near the headquarters of Delta Air Lines.

In Atlanta, Highway 41 was formerly carried on Spring Street near Five Points, but it has long been re-routed via Northside Drive around the downtown area. (It was a major truck route.) Mercedes-Benz Stadium, Georgia World Congress Center, and State Farm Arena are located off Northside Drive. North of Atlanta, the stretch of Highway 41 between Atlanta and Marietta was the first four-lane highway in Georgia when it was completed in 1938. Now, Northside Parkway and Cobb Parkway carry US 41 through northern Fulton and Cobb counties. This thoroughfare is the home of Truist Park, the Big Chicken, Cumberland Mall, the Cobb Galleria, and the Six Flags White Water amusement park. US 41 also passes through Marietta, Kennesaw, Acworth, Cartersville, Adairsville, Calhoun, and Dalton en route to Tennessee.

=== Tennessee ===
US 41, joined by US 76, enters Tennessee east of I-75 on the outskirts of East Ridge. It is called Ringgold Road through East Ridge up to the Bachman Tunnel, where it enters Chattanooga and then around the base of Lookout Mountain. It then heads through the towns of Lookout Valley, Jasper, and other communities before ascending the Cumberland Plateau, running through Tracy City and Monteagle, where it descends toward Manchester.

After reaching Monteagle, US 41, included as part of the older Dixie Highway, continues northwest into Pelham, in Grundy County, then runs closely parallel with I-24 into Coffee County, going through Hillsboro, Manchester (where the road is also named Hillsboro Boulevard) and Beechgrove, before entering Rutherford County. From there, the highway continues diagonally through Murfreesboro (where the road is also named Broad Street), where the Dixie Highway joins up with US 70S. The Stones River National Battlefield is located very near US 41/US 70S on the northwest side, standing as a monument of the Battle of Stones River which took place during the American Civil War. US 41/US 70S continues northwest through Smyrna, and LaVergne before reaching Davidson County. The road passes through Antioch, before reaching Nashville, where US 41 separates from US 70S. US 41 goes through Nashville as Murfreesboro Road, then Dickerson Pike, and comes out on the northeast side of the city joined with US 31W. US 41 continues northeast through Goodlettsville before breaking away from US 31W. US 41 then goes northwest and continues on into Robertson County, going through Springfield before heading west/northwest to the Kentucky border. Just before reaching Kentucky, US 41 briefly runs through Montgomery County.

=== Kentucky ===
US 41 enters the state as a two-lane highway in Guthrie where it intersects US 79 and continues through Todd County through Trenton. After crossing into Christian County, US 41 goes through Pembroke before reaching Hopkinsville. In Hopkinsville, US 41 intersects the US 68 bypass and the Pennryrile Parkway which leads into downtown Hopkinsville. In downtown, US 41 has a short concurrency with US 68/KY 80 and has an intersection with the northern end of US 41A. Finally, after an intersection with the northern Hopkinsville bypass, US 41 turns to Crofton and northern Christian County.

After crossing into Hopkins County, US 41 has an incomplete intersection with the Pennyrile Parkway and goes through the small towns of Nortonville (and an intersection with US 62), Mortons Gap, Earlington. In Madisonville, US 41 is known as Main Street and has an intersection with the southern end of US 41 Alternate. After an incomplete interchange with I-69, US 41 continues onto Hanson. In eastern Webster, US 41 goes through the towns of Slaughters and Sebree. In Henderson County, US 41 enters Robards and remains a rural two-lane highway before reaching KY 425, just to the south of the Henderson city limits. At KY 425, US 41 turns to the east and intersects the current northern end of I-69 in Kentucky.

At this point, US 41 becomes a limited access four-lane highway with intersections with the Audubon Parkway, KY 2084, KY 351, and US 60. At US 60, US 41 becomes a four-lane surface road with stoplights as it crosses through the northern parts of Henderson and John James Audubon State Park. US 41 crosses the Ohio River on the Bi-State Vietnam Gold Star Bridges, known locally as the "Twin Bridges." Due to natural fluctuations of the Ohio River's path, US 41 remains in Kentucky for about one mile north of the Twin Bridges. In this section, US 41 passes by Ellis Park Race Course before crossing into Evansville, IN.

=== Indiana ===
In the state of Indiana, US 41 runs from the Ohio River south of Evansville to Chicago with US 12 and US 20 beneath the termini of the Chicago Skyway and the Indiana Toll Road. This is a distance of approximately 282 miles (615 km).

For its entire length north of Evansville, US 41 passes through largely rural portions of far western Indiana. It overlaps US 150 and US 52 through some of these areas. US 41 is also the main north–south road through Terre Haute. However north of Terre Haute, US 41 becomes a secondary road, passing through smaller towns such as Rockville and Attica on the east side of the Wabash River. State Road 63 is the main route north of Terre Haute in this area since it is a four-lane highway on the west side of the Wabash River. US 41 returns to a four-lane divided highway just south of Boswell where SR 63 ends, staying as such until reaching Cedar Lake. From Cedar Lake north to the Illinois state line, US 41 is a well-travelled road with numerous stoplights, with the exception of the mile-stretch where it overlaps Interstate 80/94. Before leaving Indiana, US 41 travels through the city of Hammond where it is also known as Indianapolis Boulevard and Calumet Avenue. Hammond is the largest city traversed by US 41 between Evansville and Chicago.

=== Illinois ===
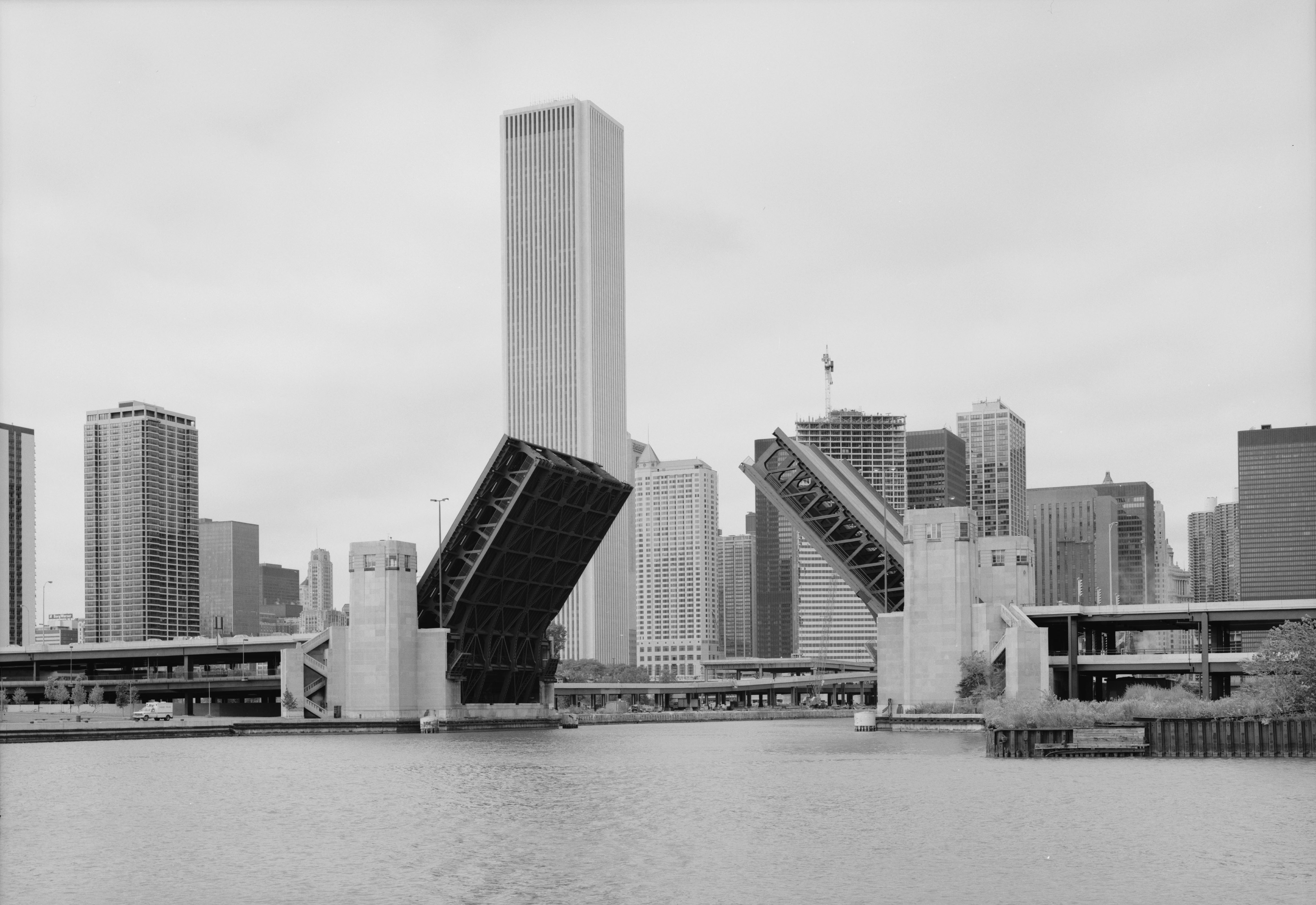
Double-deck bascule bridge carrying Lake Shore Drive over the Chicago River in 1987.

US 41 enters Illinois cosigned with US 12 and US 20 on Indianapolis Boulevard beneath the Chicago Skyway. At the Illinois–Indiana state line, US 41 enters the Chicago city limits. The three US routes run together northwest along Indianapolis Boulevard then cut north on Ewing Avenue on the south side. At 95th Street, US 12 and 20 head west. US 41 then runs along the lake amongst the newly developed extension of Lake Shore Drive, which extends from the intersection of Ewing Avenue and Harbor Drive and continues northwest until it reaches 79th St and South Shore Dr. US 41 then continues down South Shore Drive through the South Shore neighborhood and then turns and moves in a northerly direction at the intersection of South Shore Drive and Marquette Drive (Lake Shore Drive continues north while Marquette continues south and eventually becomes Jeffery Blvd.)

US 41, as Lake Shore Drive, passes by the Museum of Science and Industry (at 57th Street) in the Hyde Park area. From here north, US 41 is a quasi-expressway with bridges too low to admit trucks, and a 45 mph (72 km/h) speed zone, and exits at 53rd Street/Hyde Park Boulevard, 50th Street, 47th Street, Oakwood Boulevard, 31st Street, Interstate 55, and 18th Street. After the I-55 bridges, US 41 passes McCormick Place, which is the largest convention center in North America. At this point, the roadway becomes a boulevard passing the Museum Campus (Field Museum, Shedd Aquarium, and Adler Planetarium) and Soldier Field, home of the Chicago Bears; access to these attractions is provided at 18th Street.

The roadway continues north with a couple of signals as it passes through Grant Park and by Buckingham Fountain. After the signal at Monroe Street, the roadway becomes a quasi-expressway again with exits at Randolph Street/Wacker Drive, Illinois Street/Grand Avenue (Navy Pier exit), and a signal at Chicago Avenue. The roadway then has a sharp S-curve called the Oak Street Curve where the suggested speed limit is 25 mph (40 km/h). After the curve, US 41 is a full expressway. US 41 exits at Foster Avenue but Lake Shore Drive continues north to Bryn Mawr Avenue and Hollywood Avenue before ending.

At Broadway, US 41 intersects the eastern terminus of US 14. US 41 continues along Lincoln Avenue in the north side of the city, eventually meeting Skokie Boulevard/Cicero Avenue, where US 41 turns north and is paralleled by Interstate 94. In the northern suburbs of Chicago, US 41 joins I-94 (Edens Expressway) just north of Lake Avenue for a short distance before splitting from the freeway just south of Lake–Cook Road and continuing north as the Skokie Highway for roughly 25 miles (40 km) to a point near the Wisconsin border. Just south of the border, US 41 rejoins I-94. The two co-signed routes continue northward into Wisconsin.

=== Wisconsin ===
In Wisconsin, US 41 runs north and south along the eastern edge of the state. It enters from Illinois in Pleasant Prairie and is concurrent with Interstate 94 north to Milwaukee. In Milwaukee, US 41 follows Interstate 894 around the southern and western sides of the city. US 41 then heads north-northwest on a freeway to Fond du Lac and Oshkosh, then northeast to Appleton and Green Bay. The route is a major access point for the EAA AirVenture Oshkosh air show in Oshkosh, and for Lambeau Field, home of the Green Bay Packers. Beyond Green Bay, US 41 continues on to Oconto and Peshtigo before reaching the Michigan border at Marinette. US 41 is a freeway for nearly 70% of its length through Wisconsin, with the exceptions being an expressway section north of Green Bay and surface streets in Marinette.

US 41 was officially designated Interstate 41 between Green Bay and the Wisconsin–Illinois state line on April 9, 2015. I-41 has been cosigned with US 41 along the freeway sections between a point just south of the Illinois state line where US 41 and I-94 split, and the I-43 interchange northwest of Green Bay.

=== Michigan ===
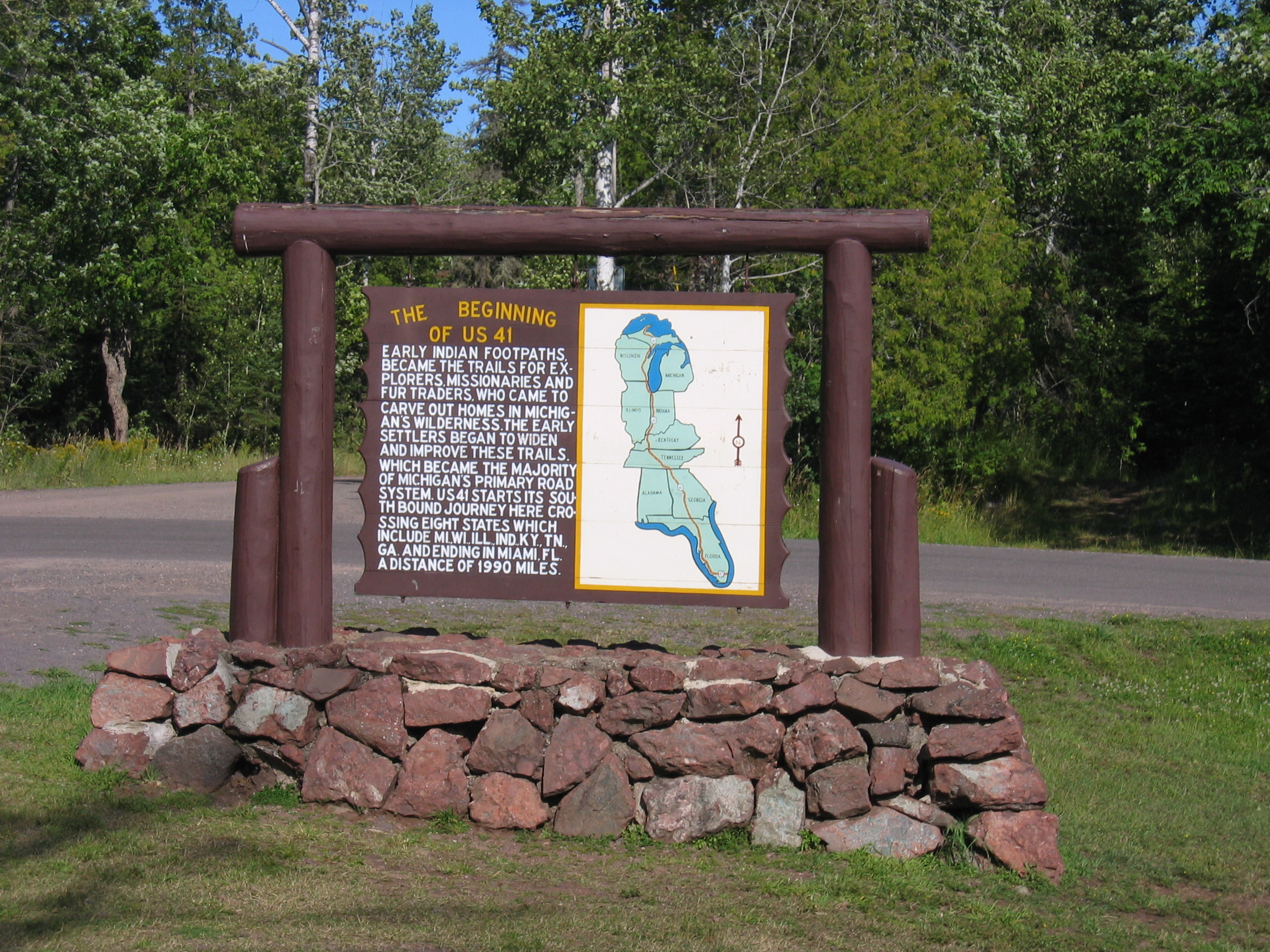
A sign in Copper Harbor where US 41 begins, October 2006

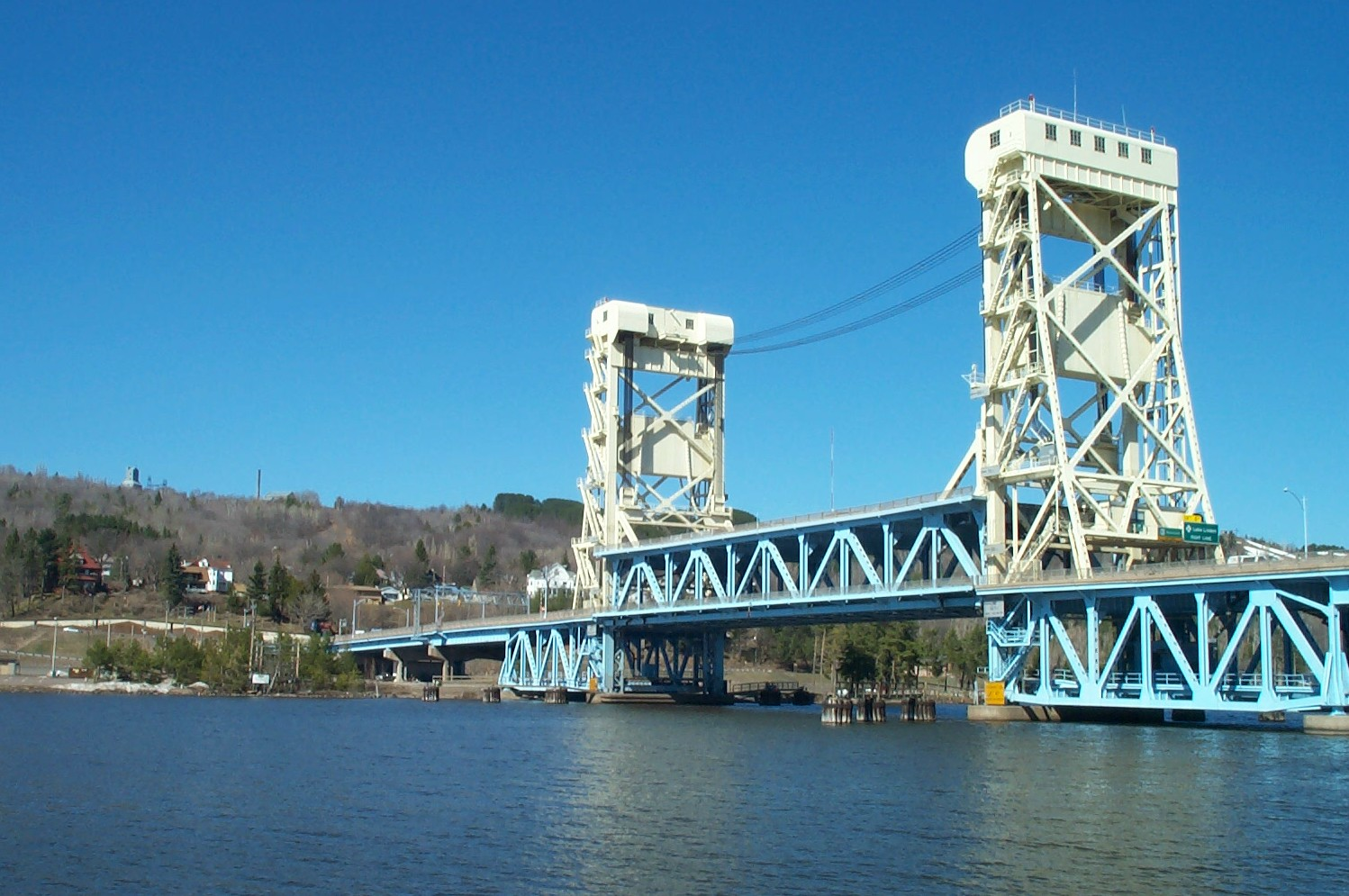
Portage Lake Lift Bridge carrying US 41/M-26 across the Keweenaw Waterway from Houghton to Hancock

US 41 is a state trunkline highway that enters Michigan via the Interstate Bridge between Marinette, Wisconsin, and Menominee, Michigan. Along its nearly 279 1/4-mile (449.4 km) route, US 41 serves as a major conduit for Michigan traffic, serving the Central Upper Peninsula and the Copper Country. From the Michigan–Wisconsin border to downtown Houghton, the highway is part of the National Highway System. The trunkline comprises mostly two lanes, undivided except for sections that run concurrently with US 2 near Escanaba or M-28 near Marquette. US 41/M-28 is a four-lane expressway along the Marquette Bypass, and segments of the highway in Delta and Marquette counties have four lanes. The route carries the designation of the Copper Country Trail National Scenic Byway between Hancock and Copper Harbor. The trunkline ends at a cul-de-sac east of Fort Wilkins Historic State Park in Copper Harbor.

Along its route, US 41 passes through farm fields, forest lands, and along the Lake Superior shoreline. The highway is included in the Lake Superior Circle Tour and the Lake Michigan Circle Tour. It also passes through the Hiawatha National Forest and the Keweenaw National Historical Park. Historical landmarks along the trunkline include the Marquette Branch Prison, Peshekee River Bridge, and the Quincy Mine.

== History ==
U.S. Highway 94
- Location: Naples–Miami
- Existed: 1926–1949

When their routes were originally laid out in 1926, US 41's southern endpoint was in Naples, Florida, at the western endpoint of US 94, which ran east to Miami. In 1949, US 94 was decommissioned, and the entire route became part of US 41, giving it an east–west section that retained the hidden SR 90 designation. The former US 94 ended in Miami at the same intersection where US 41 (and SR 90) do now. In 1953, US 41 was extended along US 1 and State Road A1A (SR A1A) to terminate in Miami Beach, Florida, but it was truncated back to the earlier terminus in 2000. Prior to 1993, when the Florida Department of Transportation color-coded U.S. highways in Florida, the color used for US 41 was orange.

US 41 initially took a more westerly route between Nashville, Tennessee, and Hopkinsville, Kentucky. The current US 41 was US 241. In 1930, the two routes became US 41W and US 41E, but in 1943 the western route became US 41 Alternate, with the main US 41 moving to the east route.

In July 2005, efforts started in Congress to re-designate US 41 between Milwaukee and Green Bay, Wisconsin, as I-41. Those efforts came to fruition in April 2015, almost ten years later, with US 41 signage mostly replaced by I-41 starting at the Illinois state line, following I-894 around the west end of Milwaukee, and on to Green Bay.

== Major intersections ==
Florida
US 1 in Miami
I-95 in Miami
US 441 in Miami
US 17 in Punta Gorda
US 301 in Sarasota
US 301 in Bradenton. The highways travel concurrently to Palmetto.
US 19 in Memphis
I-275 north-northeast of Tampa
I-4 in Tampa
US 92 in Tampa. The highways travel concurrently through the city.
US 98 in Brooksville. The highways travel concurrently through the city.
US 27 in Williston. The highways travel concurrently to High Springs.
US 441 in High Springs. The highways travel concurrently to south of Lake City.
I-75 in Ellisville
US 90 in Lake City
I-10 northwest of Five Points
US 129 southeast of Jasper. The highways travel concurrently to Jasper.
Georgia
US 84 / US 221 in Valdosta. US 41/US 221 travels concurrently through the city.
I-75 northwest of Valdosta. The highways travel concurrently to Hahira.
US 82 / US 319 in Tifton
I-75 in Tifton
US 280 in Cordele
I-75 in Unadilla
I-75 in Perry
US 341 in Perry
US 129 north of Sofkee. The highways travel concurrently to Macon.
I-75 in Macon
US 80 in Macon
I-475 in Bolingbroke
US 341 south of Barnesville
US 19 south of Griffin. The highways travel concurrently to Atlanta.
I-75 west of Morrow
I-285 in Forest Park
I-75 on the Atlanta–Hapeville city line
I-85 in Atlanta
US 29 in Atlanta. The highways travel concurrently through the city.
US 29 / US 78 / US 278 in Atlanta. US 41/US 78/US 278 travels concurrently through the city.
I-75 in Atlanta
I-75 in Atlanta
I-75 in Atlanta
I-285 east of Smyrna
US 411 in Cartersville. The highways travel concurrently to northwest of Cartersville.
US 76 east of Dalton. The highways travel concurrently to Chattanooga, Tennessee.
I-75 in Dalton
I-75 southeast of Ringgold
Tennessee
I-75 in East Ridge
I-24 in Chattanooga
US 11 / US 64 in Chattanooga. The highways travel concurrently through the city.
US 11 / US 64 in Chattanooga. US 11/US 41 travels concurrently through the city. US 41/US 64 travels concurrently to Jasper.
US 27 / US 72 in Chattanooga. US 41/US 72 travels concurrently to Jasper.
I-24 in Chattanooga
I-24 in Manchester
I-24 northwest of Manchester
US 70S in Murfreesboro. The highways travel concurrently to Nashville.
US 231 in Murfreesboro. The highways travel concurrently through the city.
I-24 / I-40 in Nashville
US 31 in Nashville. The highways travel concurrently through the city.
US 70 / US 431 in Nashville. US 41/US 431 travels concurrently through the city.
US 31 / US 31E / US 31W in Nashville. US 31W/US 41 travels concurrently to Goodlettsville.
I-65 in Nashville
US 431 in Springfield. The highways travel concurrently through the city.
Kentucky
US 79 in Guthrie
US 68 in Hopkinsville. The highways travel concurrently through the city.
US 62 in Nortonville
I-69 in Madisonville
I-69 in Henderson. The highways travel concurrently through the city.
Future I-69 / US 60 in Henderson
Indiana
I-69 in Evansville
I-64 on the Scott–Johnson township line
US 50 / US 150 in Vincennes. US 41/US 50 travels concurrently through the city. US 41/US 150 travels concurrently to Terre Haute.
I-70 / US 40 in Terre Haute
US 36 in Rockville
US 136 in Veedersburg. The highways travel concurrently through the city.
I-74 in Veedersburg
US 52 southeast of Earl Park. The highways travel concurrently to Kentland.
US 24 / US 52 in Kentland
US 231 in St. John
US 30 in Schererville
I-80 / I-94 / US 6 in Hammond. The highways travel concurrently through the city.
I-90 Toll in Hammond
US 12 / US 20 in Hammond. The highways travel concurrently to Chicago.
I-90 Toll in Hammond
Illinois
I-90 Toll in Chicago
I-55 in Chicago
US 14 in Chicago
US 14 in Chicago
I-94 in Wilmette. The highways travel concurrently to Northbrook.
I-41 / I-94 Toll in Wadsworth. I-41/US 41 travels concurrently to Howard, Wisconsin. I-94/US 41 travels concurrently to Milwaukee, Wisconsin.
Wisconsin
I-43 / I-894 in Milwaukee. I-43/US 41 travel concurrently through the city.
I-43 / I-794 in Milwaukee
US 18 in Milwaukee
US 45 in Milwaukee. The highways travel concurrently to Richfield.
US 151 in Fond du Lac
US 45 in Oshkosh
US 10 northwest of Menasha
US 141 in Howard. The highways travel concurrently to the Town of Abrams.
I-41 / I-43 in Howard
Michigan
US 2 in Powers. The highways travel concurrently to Rapid River.
US 141 in Covington
Cul-de-sac east of Fort Wilkins Historic State Park east of Copper Harbor

== See also ==
- Special routes of U.S. Route 41

Browse numbered routes
← KY 40	KY	→ US 42
