= Interstate 169 (Kentucky) =

Highway in Kentucky

Interstate 169
- I-169 highlighted in red

Route information
- Auxiliary route of I-69
- Maintained by KYTC
- Length: 34.271 mi (55.154 km)
- Existed: December 2024–present
- History: Opened in 1976 as the Pennyrile Parkway; Redesignated as I-169 in December 2024
- NHS: Entire route

Major junctions
- South end: I-24 near Hopkinsville
- US 41 in Hopkinsville; US 68 / KY 80 in Hopkinsville; US 62 near Nortonville
- North end: I-69 / Future I-569 / Western Kentucky Parkway near Nortonville

Location
- Country: United States
- State: Kentucky
- Counties: Christian, Hopkins

Highway system
- Interstate Highway System; Main; Auxiliary; Suffixed; Business; Future; Kentucky State Highway System; Interstate; US; State; Parkways
← KY 168	→ KY 169

Interstate 169 (I-169) is a 34.271-mile-long (55.154 km) auxiliary Interstate Highway that travels along the former southern section of the Pennyrile Parkway in Kentucky. U.S. President Donald Trump signed the I-169 designation into law on May 7, 2017, and the highway was officially re-signed and redesignated as I-169 in December 2024, following its upgrade to Interstate Highway standards. It travels north from a trumpet interchange with I-24 south of Hopkinsville to a cloverleaf interchange with its parent, I-69, and the Western Kentucky Parkway near Nortonville.

== Route description ==
The route begins at a trumpet interchange with I-24 near Hopkinsville. It runs northward into the city of Hopkinsville. After passing through, I-169 runs through farmland and the Western Coal Field, running roughly parallel to U.S. Route 41 (US 41) and bypassing numerous small towns before ending at a converted cloverleaf interchange with I-69 and the Western Kentucky Parkway and merging with I-69 through traffic.

== History ==
The freeway was originally known solely as, and part of, the Pennyrile Parkway, one of the original nine parkways in the Kentucky parkway system, from its 1969 opening until May 7, 2017, when Congress officially designated the section from the I-24 junction in southern Christian County to the I-69/Western Kentucky Parkway junction near Nortonville. In addition to I-169's current alignment, the Pennyrile Parkway also traveled further northward to its original terminus in Henderson until most of that stretch of the parkway was signed as I-69 in November 2015. US 41 followed the remaining routing of the Pennyrile Parkway from the Henderson Bypass exit to the US 41/US 60 junction in Henderson.

The first seven miles (11 km) was not built and completed until March 2011. The Pennyrile Parkway's original southern terminus was at the exit 7 interchange in Hopkinsville. Construction of that section was built in phases from 2009 to 2011.

The Kentucky Transportation Cabinet awarded a $13.9-million project to Scotty's Contracting to upgrade the highway to Interstate standards. These improvements include raising the vertical bridge clearance heights at three overpasses, reconstruction of bridge railings over Drakes Creek, interchange improvements at exits 30, 33, and 34, and the development of a future project to improve exit 11. The project was completed in December 2024, with I-169 signage being installed and the roadway being officially redesignated.

== Exit list ==
County	Location	mi	km	Exit	Destinations	Notes
Christian		0.000	0.000	1	I-24 – Nashville, Paducah	I-24 exit 81; southern terminus; signed as exits 1A (west) and 1B (east) southbound; trumpet interchange
Christian	Hopkinsville	5.175	8.328	5	Lover's Lane – Hopkinsville	Serves James E. Bruce Convention Center, northbound exit 5A
Christian	Hopkinsville	6.000	9.656	6	US 68 Byp. (Eagle Way) – Hopkinsville	Northbound exit 5B
Christian	Hopkinsville	7.000	11.265	7	US 41 Alt. – Hopkinsville, Fort Campbell	
Christian	Hopkinsville	7.935	12.770	8	US 41 / KY 109 – Hopkinsville, Pembroke	Southern end of US 41 Truck concurrency
Christian	Hopkinsville	9.359	15.062	9	US 68 / KY 80 – Hopkinsville, Elkton	Serves Jefferson Davis Monument State Historic Site and the Hopkinsville-Christian County Airport
Christian	Hopkinsville	11.697	18.824	11	KY 1682 / US 41 Truck north – Hopkinsville	Northern end of US 41 Truck concurrency; serves Hopkinsville Community College and provides access to KY 107
Christian	Crofton	22.653	36.456	23	KY 800 – Crofton	Serves Pennyrile Forest State Resort Park
Hopkins	Nortonville	29.568	47.585	30	US 41 south	Southbound exit and northbound entrance
Hopkins	Nortonville	32.861	52.885	33	US 62 – Nortonville, Greenville	
Hopkins	Nortonville	34.271	55.154	34	I-69 / Western Kentucky Parkway east – Elizabethtown, Fulton, Henderson	I-69 exit 106; northern terminus; signed as exit 34A (east), 34B (south) and 34C (north)
1.000 mi = 1.609 km; 1.000 km = 0.621 mi: Concurrency terminus; Incomplete access
