= Etoile, Kentucky =

Unincorporated community in Kentucky, United States

Etoile
- Unincorporated community
- Location within the state of Kentucky Etoile (the United States)
- Coordinates: 36°50′8″N 85°54′0″W
- Country: United States
- State: Kentucky
- County: Barren
- Elevation: 728 ft (222 m)
- Time zone: UTC−6 (Central (CST))
  - Summer (DST): UTC−5 (CST)
- ZIP codes: 42131
- GNIS feature ID: 507952

Etoile is an unincorporated community in Barren County, Kentucky, United States.

== History ==
The Etoile Post Office closed in 1988.

Previously called Caney Fork, the post office opened in 1886 was named Etoile, Étoile being the French for star, for unknown reasons.
