= Crofton, Kentucky =

- City
- Motto: Small Town... Big Heart
- Location of Crofton in Christian County, Kentucky.
- Coordinates: 37°2′52″N 87°29′7″W
- Country: United States
- State: Kentucky
- County: Christian

Area
  - Total: 0.63 sq mi (1.64 km^{2})
  - Land: 0.63 sq mi (1.64 km^{2})
  - Water: 0 sq mi (0.00 km^{2})
- Elevation: 597 ft (182 m)

Population (2020)
  - Total: 653
  - Density: 1,029.1/sq mi (397.33/km^{2})
- Time zone: UTC-6 (Central (CST))
  - Summer (DST): UTC-5 (CDT)
- ZIP code: 42217
- Area codes: 270 & 364
- FIPS code: 21-18658
- GNIS feature ID: 0490363
- Website: www.croftonky.com

Crofton is a home rule-class city in Christian County, Kentucky, in the United States. The population was 653 as of the 2020 census, down from 749 at the 2010 census.

Crofton is part of the Clarksville, TN–KY Metropolitan Statistical Area.

== History ==
Crofton had its start when the railroad was extended to that point. Incorporated in 1873, the city is named for pioneer James Croft, the original owner of the town site.

== Geography ==
Crofton is located in northern Christian County at 37°2′52″N 87°29′7″W (37.047752, -87.485260). U.S. Route 41 passes through the center of town as Madisonville Street, and I-169 (formerly the Pennyrile Parkway) passes east of Crofton, with access from Exit 23. Hopkinsville, the Christian County seat, is 13 miles (21 km) to the south, and Madisonville is 22 miles (35 km) to the north.

According to the United States Census Bureau, Crofton has a total area of 0.6 square miles (1.6 km^{2}), all land.

== Demographics ==
Historical population
Census	Pop.	Note	%±
1880	136		—
1890	428		214.7%
1900	278		−35.0%
1910	402		44.6%
1920	527		31.1%
1930	461		−12.5%
1940	688		49.2%
1950	500		−27.3%
1960	892		78.4%
1970	631		−29.3%
1980	823		30.4%
1990	699		−15.1%
2000	838		19.9%
2010	749		−10.6%
2020	653		−12.8%
U.S. Decennial Census

As of the census of 2000, there were 838 people, 353 households, and 234 families residing in the city. The population density was 1,318.6 inhabitants per square mile (509.1/km^{2}). There were 380 housing units at an average density of 598.0 per square mile (230.9/km^{2}). The racial makeup of the city was 85.44% White, 12.65% African American, 0.12% Native American or Alaska Native, and 1.79% from two or more races. Hispanics or Latinos of any race were 0.24% of the population.

There were 353 households, out of which 30.9% had children under the age of 18 living with them, 44.2% were married couples living together, 17.0% had a female householder with no husband present, and 33.7% were non-families. 31.2% of all households were made up of individuals, and 14.7% had someone living alone who was 65 years of age or older. The average household size was 2.37 and the average family size was 2.96.

The age distribution was 25.5% under the age of 18, 7.0% from 18 to 24, 29.5% from 25 to 44, 21.0% from 45 to 64, and 16.9% who were 65 years of age or older. The median age was 37 years. For every 100 females, there were 76.1 males. For every 100 females age 18 and over, there were 77.3 males.

The median income for a household in the city was $25,625, and the median income for a family was $28,542. Males had a median income of $31,442 versus $17,109 for females. The per capita income for the city was $14,021. About 26.0% of families and 25.6% of the population were below the poverty line, including 33.1% of those under age 18 and 29.5% of those age 65 or over.
