= Trenton, Kentucky =

- City
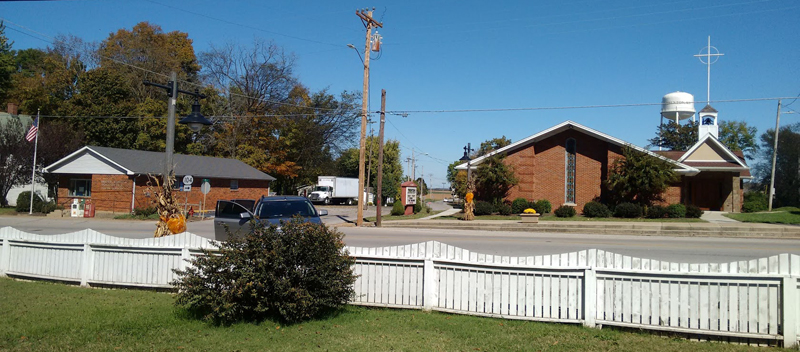
- The junction of US 41 and KY 104 in Trenton

- Location of Trenton in Todd County, Kentucky.
- Coordinates: 36°43′24″N 87°15′40″W
- Country: United States
- State: Kentucky
- County: Todd

Area
  - Total: 0.57 sq mi (1.48 km^{2})
  - Land: 0.57 sq mi (1.47 km^{2})
  - Water: 0 sq mi (0.00 km^{2})
- Elevation: 587 ft (179 m)

Population (2020)
  - Total: 326
  - Density: 573.1/sq mi (221.28/km^{2})
- Time zone: UTC-6 (Central (CST))
  - Summer (DST): UTC-5 (CDT)
- ZIP code: 42286
- Area code: 270
- FIPS code: 21-77592
- GNIS feature ID: 0505487
- Website: www.trentonky.org

Trenton is a city in Todd County, Kentucky, United States. The population was 384 at the 2010 census.

== History ==
Settled as Lewisburg in 1796, and incorporated in 1840. The city was renamed after Trenton, New Jersey in 1819.

== Geography ==
Trenton is located at 36°43′24″N 87°15′40″W (36.723246, -87.261209).

According to the United States Census Bureau, the city has a total area of 0.6 square miles (1.6 km^{2}), all land.

== Demographics ==
Historical population
| Census | Pop. | Note | %± |
|---|---|---|---|
| 1830 | 178 | | — |
| 1870 | 221 | | — |
| 1880 | 152 | | −31.2% |
| 1890 | 455 | | 199.3% |
| 1900 | 600 | | 31.9% |
| 1910 | 653 | | 8.8% |
| 1920 | 552 | | −15.5% |
| 1930 | 524 | | −5.1% |
| 1940 | 572 | | 9.2% |
| 1950 | 577 | | 0.9% |
| 1960 | 542 | | −6.1% |
| 1970 | 496 | | −8.5% |
| 1980 | 465 | | −6.2% |
| 1990 | 378 | | −18.7% |
| 2000 | 419 | | 10.8% |
| 2010 | 384 | | −8.4% |
| 2020 | 326 | | −15.1% |
U.S. Decennial Census

== Notable people ==
Musician and activist Josephine Leavell Allensworth was born in Trenton.
