= Fearsville, Kentucky =

- Unincorporated community
- Location within Kentucky
- Coordinates: 36°59′02″N 87°21′27″W
- Country: United States
- State: Kentucky
- County: Christian
- Elevation: 560 ft (170 m)
- ZIP code: 42240
- GNIS feature ID: 0492011

Fearsville is an unincorporated community in Christian County, Kentucky, United States.The community was named for the family of Carson Fears, a Christian County native.
