= List of parkways and named highways in Kentucky =

- Highway markers for Audubon Parkway, Western Kentucky Parkway, and AA Highway

Highway names
- Interstates: Interstate nn (I-nn)
- US Highways: U.S. Highway nn (US nn)
- State: Kentucky Route nn (KY nn)

System links
- Kentucky State Highway System; Interstate; US; State; Parkways

This is a list of parkways and named highways in Kentucky. Most parkways also carry an unsigned 9000-series designation.

== Kentucky Parkway System ==
The Kentucky Parkway System is a statewide system of controlled-access highways financed and built as toll roads. State law requires the removal of tolls once the cost of construction is recouped; all parkways are toll-free. The system is built at or near-to interstate standards, and it provides access to portions of Kentucky not serviced by interstates. Several parkways have been or are planned to be re-designated as mainline or spur interstate highways.

Parkway	Reference number	Length (mi)	Length (km)	Southern or western terminus	Northern or eastern terminus	Opened	Removed	Current designation	Notes
Audubon Parkway	AU 9005	23.4	37.7	US 41 in Henderson	US 60 in Owensboro	1970	—	I-69 Spur	
Martha Layne Collins Bluegrass Parkway	BG 9002	71.1	114.4	I-65 in Elizabethtown	US 60 in Versailles	1965	—		
Louie B. Nunn Cumberland Parkway	LN 9008	92.3	148.5	I-65 near Park City	US 27 in Somerset	1972	—	Future I-365	
Hal Rogers Parkway	KY 80 (signed)	32.1	51.7	US 27 / KY 80 near Somerset	US 25 / KY 80 east in London	2015	—		Parkway was extended westward onto KY 80
Hal Rogers Parkway	HR 9006	59.0	95.0	US 25 / KY 80 east in London	KY 15 / KY 80 in Hazard	1971	—		Formerly named Daniel Boone Parkway
Kentucky Turnpike		39.6	63.7	Western Kentucky Parkway in Elizabethtown	I-264 in Louisville	1954	1975	I-65	Signage removed along with tolls in 1975
Bert T. Combs Mountain Parkway	KY 9000	43.1	69.4	I-64 in Winchester	KY 15 Spur in Campton	1963	—		
Bert T. Combs Mountain Parkway	KY 9009	32.5	52.3	KY 15 Spur in Campton	US 460 in Salyersville	1963	—		
Natcher Parkway	WN 9007	2.1	3.4	US 231 near Bowling Green	I-65 / I-165 in Bowling Green	1972	2019	KY 9007 (signed)	Originally named the Green River Parkway (1972–1994)
Natcher Parkway	WN 9007	70.2	113.0	I-65 / I-165 in Bowling Green	US 60 / US 231 in Owensboro	1972	2019	I-165	Originally named the Green River Parkway (1972–1994)
Edward T. Breathitt Pennyrile Parkway	EB 9004	29.6	47.6	I-24 near Hopkinsville	US 41 in Nortonville	1969	2024	I-169	
Edward T. Breathitt Pennyrile Parkway	EB 9004	4.7	7.6	US 41 in Nortonville	I-69 / Future I-569 / Western Kentucky Parkway	1994	2024	I-169	Built to parkway standards in 1976 but was toll-free and signed as US 41 until 1994
Edward T. Breathitt Pennyrile Parkway	EB 9004	10.9	17.5	I-69 / Future I-569 / Western Kentucky Parkway	US 41 in Madisonville	1994	2024	I-69	Built to parkway standards in 1976 but was toll-free and signed as US 41 until 1994
Edward T. Breathitt Pennyrile Parkway	EB 9004	31.1	50.1	US 41 in Madisonville	KY 425 near Henderson	1969	2024	I-69	
Edward T. Breathitt Pennyrile Parkway	EB 9004	5.9	9.5	KY 425 near Henderson	US 41 / KY 351 near Henderson	1969	2024	I-69	
Julian M. Carroll Purchase Parkway	JC 9003	51.3	82.6	US 51 / SR 215 / Future I-69 at the Tennessee state line	US 62 / KY 1523 in Calvert City	1966	2024	I-69	
Wendell H. Ford Western Kentucky Parkway	WK 9001	11	18	I-24 in Eddyville	KY 91 / KY 139 in Princeton	1968	2011	I-69	
Wendell H. Ford Western Kentucky Parkway	WK 9001	27	43	KY 91 / KY 139 in Princeton	I-69 / I-169 in Nortonville	1963	2011	I-69	
Wendell H. Ford Western Kentucky Parkway	WK 9001	38.5	62.0	I-69 / I-169 in Nortonville	I-165 in Beaver Dam	1963	—	Future I-569	
Wendell H. Ford Western Kentucky Parkway	WK 9001	60.0	96.6	I-165 / Future I-569 in Beaver Dam	US 31W / KY 61 near Elizabethtown	1963	—		
Former

== Other named highways ==
Road	Route Designation	Length (mi)	Length (km)	Southern or western terminus	Northern or eastern terminus	Year Established	Notes
AA Highway	KY 9	111.0	178.7	KY 1 / KY 7 near Grayson	I-275 in Wilder	1995	Mainline of AA Highway and southeastern spur
AA Highway	KY 10	24.6	39.6	AA–KY 9 / KY 1149 south near Vanceburg	US 23 near Greenup	1995	Northeastern spur of AA Highway
Dr. Martin Luther King Jr. Expressway	I-65	12.2	19.6	I-265 / KY 841 near Louisville	Indiana state line near Louisville	2007	Named only through Louisville Metro
Eagle Way	KY 1682	5.894	9.485	US 68 / KY 80 / US 68 By-Pass east	KY 107 / KY 1682 east	1976	Partial beltway of Hopkinsville, includes connections with I-24 and I-169
Eagle Way	US 68 Byp. / US 68 Truck	11.026	17.745	US 68 / KY 80 / KY 1682 east	US 68 / KY 80	2001	Partial beltway of Hopkinsville, includes connections with I-24 and I-169
Gene Snyder Freeway	I-265	28.7	46.2	I-65 in Louisville	Indiana state line near Louisville	1986	Formerly named "Jefferson Freeway"
Georgia Davis Powers Expressway	I-264	6.9	11.1	I-64 / US 150 in Louisville	US 31W / US 60 (Dixie Highway) in Louisville	2010	Previously named the "Shawnee Expressway" from 1974 to 2010
Henry Watterson Expressway	I-264	15.5	24.9	US 31W / US 60 (Dixie Highway) in Louisville	I-71 in Louisville	1948	
Industrial Parkway	KY 67	14.2	22.9	I-64 near Grayson	KY 3105 in Wurtland	2002	
Mammoth Cave Parkway	KY 255	2.4	3.9	US 31W / KY 255 south in Park City	KY 70 / KY 255 north in Mammoth Cave		
Mammoth Cave Parkway	KY 70	2.5	4.0	KY 70 / KY 255 north in Mammoth Cave	KY 70 west in Mammoth Cave		
Mammoth Cave Parkway	none	3.5	5.6	KY 70 west in Mammoth Cave	Mammoth Cave Visitor Center		Concurrent with KY 255 and KY 70 on its southern end. Mostly maintained by the National Park Service as most of it is located within Mammoth Cave National Park.
Man o' War Boulevard	none	15.39	24.77	US 60 (Versailles Road)	I-75	1975	Surface road serving as partial southern beltway around Lexington. Constructed by the Kentucky Transportation Cabinet, the unnumbered portion is maintained by the city
Man o' War Boulevard	KY 1425	0.987	1.588	I-75	US 60 (Winchester Road)	1975	Surface road serving as partial southern beltway around Lexington. Constructed by the Kentucky Transportation Cabinet, the unnumbered portion is maintained by the city
New Circle Road	KY 4	19.3	31.0	Beltway around Lexington		1950	Controlled-access highway except for northeastern portion between KY 922 and US 25 / US 421
Paris Pike	US 27 / US 68	14	23	I-64 / I-75 / US 27 south / US 68 south (North Broadway) in Lexington	US 27 north / US 68 north / US 68 Bus. north (Main Street) in Paris	2003	Rural four-lane highway between Lexington and Paris
Russellville Bypass	US 431	1	1.6	US 79 / KY 3240 east	US 68 / KY 80 / US 68 Bus. east	1995	Bypass around Russellville built in stages and with four route designations
Russellville Bypass	US 68 / US 431 / KY 80	5.8	9.3	US 68 west / KY 80 west / US 68 Bus. east	US 431 north	1995	Bypass around Russellville built in stages and with four route designations
Russellville Bypass	US 68 / KY 80	1.5	2.5	US 431 north	US 68 east / KY 80 east / US 68 Bus. west	1998	Bypass around Russellville built in stages and with four route designations
Russellville Bypass	US 79	2.9	4.6	US 68 / KY 80 / US 68 Bus. west	US 431 south / KY 2146 north	2011, 2017	Bypass around Russellville built in stages and with four route designations
Russellville Bypass	US 79 / US 431	2.6	4.2	US 79 north / US 431 south	US 79 south / US 431 north / KY 3240 east	2017	Bypass around Russellville built in stages and with four route designations
Woodlands Trace National Scenic Byway ("The Trace)"	FD-100 (unsigned)			Tennessee state line (continues to TN SR 461	KY 453		Scenic byway in the Land Between the Lakes National Recreation Area
Veterans Outer Loop	KY 3600	2.5	4.0	KY 1297	US 68 / KY 80 / US 68 Bus. east	2015	Northern bypass of Glasgow
Veterans Outer Loop	US 68 / KY 80	5.5	8.9	KY 1297 / US 68 west / KY 80 west / US 68 Bus. east	KY 1519/ US 68 east / KY 80 east/ US 68 Bus. west	2004, 2011	Northern bypass of Glasgow
Veterans Outer Loop	KY 1519	1.3	2.1	US 68 / KY 80 / US 68 Bus. west	KY 1307	2011	Northern bypass of Glasgow
Wendell H. Ford Expressway	US 60	6.3	10.1	US 60 west / KY 331 north	US 231 / KY 2155 north	1970	Controlled-access partial beltway of Owensboro around its southern side
Wendell H. Ford Expressway	US 60 / US 231	6.8	10.9	US 231 south/ KY 2155 north	US 60 east / US 231 north / KY 2830	1968, 2014	Controlled-access partial beltway of Owensboro around its southern side
