= List of Kentucky supplemental roads and rural secondary highways (1–199) =

Kentucky supplemental roads and rural secondary highways (1–199)
- Highway markers for KY 1 and KY 199

Highway names
- Interstates: Interstate nn (I-nn)
- US Highways: U.S. Highway nn (US nn)
- State: KY nn

System links
- Kentucky State Highway System; Interstate; US; State; Parkways
- Supplemental/Rural Secondary; 1–199; 200–299; 300–399; 400–499; 500–599; 600–699; 700–799; 800–899; 900–999; 1000–1499; 1500–1999; 2000–2499; 2500–2999; 3000–3499; 3500–6999

Kentucky supplemental roads and rural secondary highways are the lesser two of the four functional classes of highways constructed and maintained by the Kentucky Transportation Cabinet, the state-level agency that constructs and maintains highways in Kentucky. The agency splits its inventory of state highway mileage into four categories:

- The State Primary System includes Interstate Highways, Parkways, and other long-distance highways of statewide importance that connect the state's major cities, including much of the courses of Kentucky's U.S. Highways.
- The State Secondary System includes highways of regional importance that connect the state's smaller urban centers, including those county seats not served by the state primary system.
- The Rural Secondary System includes highways of local importance, such as farm-to-market roads and urban collectors.
- Supplemental Roads are the set of highways not in the first three systems, including frontage roads, bypassed portions of other state highways, and rural roads that only serve their immediate area.

The same-numbered highway can comprise sections of road under different categories. This list contains descriptions of Supplemental Roads and highways in the Rural Secondary System numbered 1 to 199 that do not have portions within the State Primary and State Secondary systems.

== KY 13 ==
Kentucky Route 13
- Location: Jackstown–Carlisle
- Length: 5.516 mi (8.877 km)

Kentucky Route 13 is a 5.516-mile-long (8.877 km) rural secondary highway in southern Nicholas County. The highway begins at the Bourbon County line at the South Fork of the Licking River; the route does not extend into Bourbon County. KY 13 heads north along Lower Jackstown Road, which parallels Taylor Creek north to where the route crosses and diverges from the stream at its junction with KY 3316 (Taylor Creek Road). North of KY 386 (Carpenter Road), the highway crosses and follows McBride Run before continuing north toward Carlisle. KY 13 intersects the Transkentucky Transportation Railroad immediately before its terminus at an acute junction with KY 36 (Concrete Road) at the west city limit of Carlisle.

== KY 24 ==
Kentucky Route 24
- Location: Sardis–Carter
- Existed: by 1936–by 1976

Kentucky Route 24 was a state highway running from US 62 east of Sardis to KY 2 in Carter. By 1976, KY 24 was decommissioned (because of I-24): the section from US 62 to KY 11 was renumbered KY 324, the section from KY 11 to the Fleming County Line was given to the county (now Hord Pike) the section from there to KY 673 became KY 2509 (given to the county in November 1982), the section from KY 673 to KY 597 became part of KY 673, the section from KY 597 to KY 57 became part of KY 597 (given to the county by 1977, now Mt. Gilead Road/Poplar Grove Road; KY 597 was rerouted over KY 673), the section from KY 57 to KY 59 was renumbered KY 344, and the section from KY 59 to KY 2 was renumbered KY 474.

== KY 37 ==
Kentucky Route 37
- Location: Forkland–Danville
- Length: 18.370 mi (29.564 km)

Kentucky Route 37 is a 18.730-mile-long (30.143 km) rural secondary highway in southern Boyle County. The highway begins at KY 243 at the confluence of Little South Fork with North Rolling Fork, a tributary of Rolling Fork, west of Forkland. Here, North Rolling Fork forms the Boyle–Casey county line; KY 243 immediately heads south onto Little South Road across North Rolling Fork into the latter county. KY 37 heads east on Forkland Road through the valley of North Rolling Fork. The highway passes through Forkland and crosses Hungry Neck Fork at its junction with KY 1108. KY 37 crosses North Rolling Fork twice west of Johnson Branch, which the route crosses just west of its intersection with KY 1822. The highway crosses North Rolling Fork for the last time as the route veers south and follows Shelby Branch to near the Boyle–Casey county line. KY 37 ascends out of the stream valley and descends along White Oak Road to the valley of White Oak Creek. The highway leaves White Oak Creek at its junction with KY 3365 (Hogue Hollow Road) and heads northeast into Junction City, which the route enters along White Oak Lane. KY 37 runs concurrently west along KY 300 along Shelby Street. At the west city limit, the highway splits from KY 300 onto Stewards Lane, which the route follows to its terminus at US 150 Bypass at the edge of the city of Danville.

=== History ===
A previous KY 37 ran from the Ohio state line to US 60 in Frankfort. This became part of US 421 in July 1949, and Kentucky Route 421 (established 1948) was renumbered to new KY 37.

== KY 46 ==
Kentucky Route 46
- Location: Nelsonville–Greenbrier
- Length: 13.656 mi (21.977 km)

Kentucky Route 46 is a 13.656-mile-long (21.977 km) rural secondary highway in southern Nelson County. The highway begins at KY 52 in Nelsonville. KY 46 heads east along Nat Rogers Road to US 31E (New Haven Road) north of Culvertown. US 31E and KY 46 run concurrently northeast to Balltown, where KY 46 turns south at an oblique intersections onto Balltown Road. That highway heads southeast to its eastern terminus at KY 49 (Loretto Road) south of Greenbrier.

== KY 50 ==
Kentucky Route 50
- Location: west of Lawrenceburg
- Existed: by 1977

Kentucky Route 50 ran from KY 512 (now Benson Creek Road) to KY 395 west of Lawrenceburg. This became part of rerouted KY 512; the old route of KY 512 was given to the county.

== KY 71 ==
Kentucky Route 71
- Location: Jarvis Store–Bush
- Existed: by 1962

Kentucky Route 71 was assigned as a renumbering of Kentucky Route 231 from Jarvis Store to Bush to avoid duplication with US 231. This was renumbered to KY 1803 by 1962 because of I-71.

== KY 72 ==
Kentucky Route 72
- Location: Blackmont–Alva; Bardo–Baxter
- Length: 16.932 mi (27.249 km)

Kentucky Route 72 is a 16.932-mile-long (27.249 km) rural secondary highway with two segments in Bell and Harlan counties. The western segment extends 8.042 miles (12.942 km) from Blackmont in eastern Bell to Alva in western Harlan County. KY 72 begins at US 119 at Blackmont. The highway crosses the Cumberland River and CSX's CV Subdivision rail line then parallels a rail spur through the valley of Puckett Creek southeast through Tuggleville and Black Snake. After crossing the Bell–Harlan county line, KY 72 crosses Rocky Branch at Insull and Jackson Mill Creek east of Pathfork, where the route meets the north end of KY 2005. The highway and rail spur terminate at a dead end at Alva at the headwaters of Puckett Creek.

The eastern segment of KY 72 runs 8.890 miles (14.307 km) from south of Bardo north via Harlan to Baxter. Like the western segment, the eastern portion begins at a dead end near a rail spur terminus, this time in the headwaters of Catron Creek. KY 72 parallels the rail spur north through the creek valley through Bardo, Stanfill, and Pansy, where the route meets the west end of the spur KY 1216. The highway continues through Mary Alice and meets the east end of the spur KY 2425 at the south end of Teetersville. KY 72 continues through Elcomb to Catron Creek's confluence with Martin's Fork, the rail spur's confluence with CSX's CV Subdivision, and the route's own confluence with US 421.

KY 72 runs concurrently with US 421 through Dressen before the route splits northeast to parallel US 421 into the city of Harlan. The highway intersects KY 38 and crosses over Clover Fork at the south end of downtown Harlan. KY 72 splits into a one-way pair: northbound follows Main Street and southbound follows Cumberland Avenue. Clover Street and Walnut Street serve to connect the southbound route with the northbound route on Main Street at the north and south ends, respectively. KY 72 follows the right bank of Martin's Fork around a riverbend, in the middle of which the highway meets the south end of KY 3453 (Cold Iron Heights) and crosses a spillway from Clover Fork. The highway intersects US 421 and crosses Poor Fork at the fork's confluence with Martin's Fork to form the Cumberland River proper. West of Poor Fork, KY 72 reaches its northern terminus at KY 413 at Baxter.

== KY 75 ==
Kentucky Route 75
- Location: Lamero–McKee
- Existed: by 1962

Kentucky Route 75 ran from US 421 in McKee to KY 490 in Lamero; this became part of KY 89 in 1962 because of I-75.

== KY 83 ==
Kentucky Route 83
- Location: Cuba–Lynnfield
- Length: 5.018 mi (8.076 km)

Kentucky Route 83 is a 5.018-mile-long (8.076 km) supplemental road in southern Graves County. The highway begins at KY 303, opposite the east end of KY 2422, just west of Cuba. KY 83 heads east through the village, where the route has a pair of right-angle curves and veers southeast at its tangent intersection with the south end of KY 1390 (Cuba School Road). The highway veers east again and crosses Bacon Creek west of its intersection with KY 381 north of Lynnville. KY 83 continues east through an S-curve along Leech Creek to its terminus at KY 94 between Lynnfield and Tri City.

=== History ===
KY 83 was formed between 1945 and 1950.

The original KY 83 ran from KY 55 near Carrollton to Lockport, and was renumbered KY 389 by 1945.

== KY 87 ==
Kentucky Route 87
- Location: Akersville–Austin
- Length: 21.788 mi (35.064 km)

Kentucky Route 87 is a 28.141-mile-long (45.289 km) rural secondary highway in western Monroe County, far eastern Allen County, and southern Barren County. It extends 21.954 miles (35.332 km) from the Tennessee state line near Akersville north to US 31E near Austin. It begins at the Tennessee state line, where the road continues south as unnumbered Akersville Road. The highway heads northeast along County Line Road, which lies atop the Allen–Monroe county line. KY 87 leaves the county line when it veers onto Akersville Road, which heads east and then north through Akersville. The highway crosses the Barren River, meets the west end of KY 678 (White Oak Ridge Road), and crosses Indian Creek. KY 87 enters the city of Fountain Run along Main Street, where the route intersects KY 100 (Fountain Run Road) and briefly runs concurrently with KY 2170 (College Street and Mill Street). The highway leaves the city and enters Barren County as Austin Tracy Road. At Tracy, KY 87 briefly runs concurrently with KY 921, which heads northeast on Thomerson Park Road and southwest on Bewleytown Road, and meets the south end of KY 3179 (Oil Well Road). KY 87 passes through Austin before reaching its northern terminus at US 31E (Scottsville Road), with the entrance to the Barren River Lake State Resort Park straight ahead.

=== History ===
From around 1949 until the 1960s, the current KY 87 from Akersville to the Tennessee state line was originally KY 870. That designation has since relocated to a route in north-central Monroe County as KY 87 was extended to the state line in that area, along with its other section near Bugtussle and Gamaliel.

KY 87's original northern terminus in southern Barren County was located 0.8 miles (1.3 km) of Pageville. This was truncated to its current location following the impounding of the Barren River that created Barren River Lake in the early 1960s.

At one time until the 1980s, KY 87 ran concurrent with KY 63/100 east of Gamaliel and made a right turn onto Clementsville Road to end at a locally maintained county road at the Tennessee border, in this case, into Clay County, hence extending KY 87 by an additional 3.7 miles (6.0 km). That section was since turned over to the Monroe County Road Department.

Until 2023, KY 87 was a two-segment State highway that was also designated on a roadway from Tennessee State Route 261's eastern terminus at the state line near Bugtussle to KY 63 in Gamaliel. That roadway has received a new designation as KY 382.

== KY 96 ==
Kentucky Route 96
- Location: Keysburg–Russellville
- Length: 15.009 mi (24.155 km)

Kentucky Route 96 is a 15.009-mile-long (24.155 km) rural secondary highway in southern Logan County. The highway begins at KY 102 (Keysburg Road) at Keysburg. KY 96 heads northeast on Orndorff Mill Road and crosses Whippoorwill Creek, a tributary of the Red River. At Dot, the highway meets the south end of KY 1041 (Watermelon Road). KY 96 turns north at its junction with KY 591 (Schley Road) north of Schley. The highway meets the east end of KY 739 (Young Road) and the west end of KY 2371 (Oakville Lane) west of Oakville. Shortly before entering Russellville, KY 96 intersects the Russellville Bypass, which carries US 79 and US 431 at this intersection. The highway enters the city limits on Orndorff Mill Street and reaches its northern terminus at an intersection with KY 2146 (Nashville Street) south of downtown Russellville. The current route was in place and signed as KY 96 by 1937.

== KY 99 ==
Kentucky Route 99
- Location: Amos–Holland
- Length: 5.667 mi (9.120 km)

Kentucky Route 99 is a 5.667-mile-long (9.120 km) rural secondary highway in southern Allen County. The highway begins at the Tennessee state line, where the road continues as Tennessee State Route 10; the highway meets the south end of KY 1578 (Isom Bradley Road) at the state line. KY 99 heads northeast along Lafayette Road through the hamlet of Amos. At KY 1333 (Bandy Road), KY 99 veers northwest toward its terminus at KY 100 (Holland Road) at Holland.

== KY 102 ==
Kentucky Route 102
- Location: Keysburg–Elkton
- Length: 17.060 mi (27.455 km)

Kentucky Route 102 is a 17.060-mile-long (27.455 km) rural secondary highway in western Logan County and eastern Todd County. The highway begins next to the Red River at the Tennessee state line, from which the road continues into that state as Tennessee State Route 161. KY 102 heads northwest along Keysburg Road through the village of Keysburg, where the route meets the south end of KY 96 (Orndorff Mill Road). The highway meets the east end of KY 848 (Darnell Road) and the west end of KY 2375 (James Rose Road) before entering Todd County. KY 102 continues as Allensville Road through the eponymous village, where the route intersects at grade an R.J. Corman Railroad Group line and crosses Rum Spring Creek. The highway crosses Dry Branch and Elk Fork Creek on its way northwest to Elkton. KY 102 enters the city and follows Allensville Street to its northern terminus at US 68 Bus. (Main Street).

== KY 103 ==
Kentucky Route 103
- Location: Middleton–Chandlers Chapel
- Length: 18.086 mi (29.107 km)

Kentucky Route 103 is a 18.086-mile-long (29.107 km) rural secondary highway in western Simpson County and eastern Logan County. The highway begins at KY 100 (Russellville Road) in the village of Middleton. KY 103 follows Middleton Circle to the center of Middleton, then the highway heads northeast on Middleton Road, which crosses Spring Creek and meets the west end of KY 1170 (Turnertown Road) as it parallels the Simpson–Logan county line. At its junction with KY 621 (Pilot Knob Road), KY 103 curves northwest and enters Logan County on Logan Middleton Road. The highway meets the north end of KY 663 (Friendship Road) before entering the city of Auburn. KY 103 enters town on Wilson Avenue, briefly runs concurrently with US 68 Bus. (Main Street), and heads away from downtown on College Avenue. The highway has a grade crossing of a rail line, where the route has a pair of right angle turns, then leaves Auburn at its intersection with US 68 and KY 80 (Bowling Green Road). KY 103 continues northwest along Chandlers Road. The highway crosses Wiggington Creek and intersects KY 1038 (Bucksville Road) before reaching its northern terminus at KY 79 (Morgantown Road) at Chandlers Chapel.

== KY 108 ==
Kentucky Route 108
- Location: Glen Dean–Kirk
- Length: 6.250 mi (10.058 km)

Kentucky Route 108 is a 6.250-mile-long (10.058 km) supplemental road in western Breckinridge County. The highway begins at Glen Dean–McQuady Road at Glen Dean. KY 108 heads east along Kirk–Glen Dean Road, which intersects KY 105 (McQuady–Axtel Road). The highway continues northeast and crosses Long Lick Creek before reaching its northern terminus at KY 261 near Kirk.

== KY 110 ==
Kentucky Route 110
- Location: Shreve–Fentress McMahan; McDaniels
- Length: 12.631 mi (20.328 km)

Kentucky Route 110 is a 12.631-mile-long (20.328 km) rural secondary highway in eastern Ohio County, southern Breckinridge County, and northern Grayson County that is split into two parts. The eastern segment runs 1.541 miles (2.480 km) from Laurel Branch Camping Area on the shore of Rough River Lake along Laurel Branch Road east to KY 259 near McDaniels. The western segment extends 11.090 miles (17.848 km) from KY 54 at Shreve east to a dead end at Rough River Lake near Fentress McMahan. The western segment heads north and east from the Ohio County hamlet of Shreve and crosses Pond Run Creek into Breckinridge County. KY 110 crosses Pipe Run and passes through Falls of Rough before crossing the Rough River into Grayson County. The highway follows Green Farm Road through Hickory Corner and intersects KY 79. KY 100 continues as Blue Bird Road, which meets the north end of KY 736 (Cave Creek Road) at Falling Branch before reaching its dead end at Rough River Lake.

== KY 112 ==
Kentucky Route 112
- Location: Ilsley–Earlington
- Length: 9.758 mi (15.704 km)

Kentucky Route 112 is a 9.758-mile-long (15.704 km) rural secondary highway in southern Hopkins County. The highway begins at US 62 (Nortonville Road) southwest of Ilsley. KY 112 heads northeast along Ilsley Road, which simultaneously passes over Copperas Creek and under I-69 (Western Kentucky Parkway). The highway passes through Ilsley and meets the north end of KY 454 (St. Charles Road) at Carbondale. KY 112 continues north and crosses Copper Creek before passing through Southard, where the route meets the south end of KY 879 (Southards Church Road). The highway crosses a pair of streams between Browns Lake and Loch Mary before entering the city of Earlington. KY 112 follows Main Street through its junction with KY 1337 (McEuen Avenue), crosses Clear Creek, intersects a CSX rail line, and reaches its northern terminus at US 41 (Hopkinsville Road), which splits into a one-way pair with northbound US 41 following Main Street.

== KY 113 ==
Kentucky Route 113
- Location: Kona–Craftsville
- Length: 4.449 mi (7.160 km)

Kentucky Route 113 is a 4.449-mile-long (7.160 km) highway with rural secondary and supplemental road sections in eastern Letcher County. The highway begins as a rural secondary highway at KY 805 at Kona. KY 113 immediately crosses the North Fork of the Kentucky River and follows the river downstream to Millstone, where the route meets the east end of KY 2545, which continues downstream. KY 113 crosses the river and follows Millstone Creek upstream and crosses the creek just before its junction with KY 803 at Craftsville, where the route continues as a supplemental road upstream along the Left Fork of Millstone Creek. The highway crosses the creek twice more before reaching its terminus at the end of state maintenance beyond Millenium Road.

== KY 116 ==
Kentucky Route 116
- Location: State Line–Fulton
- Length: 13.726 mi (22.090 km)

Kentucky Route 116 is a 13.726-mile-long (22.090 km) rural secondary highway on the southern rim of Fulton County, much of which runs atop the Kentucky–Tennessee state line. The highway begins at KY 166 northeast of State Line. KY 116 heads southeast to an intersection with county-maintained State Line Road at the state line; the route turns east onto State Line Road. The highway crosses Mud Creek and meets the south end of KY 1127. At Jordan, KY 116 intersects the road designated KY 239 to the north and Tennessee State Route 21 to the south. East of Jordan, the highway meets the south end of KY 781 and crosses Hicks Branch. KY 116 passes under I-69 and US 51 and meets the south end of KY 2568 (Eastwood Drive) as it approaches the city limit of Fulton. The highway becomes State Line Avenue and enters the city just west of its intersection with US 45 (Highland Drive). East of US 45, KY 116 crosses over the Norfolk Southern Railway. On the west end of downtown Fulton, KY 116 crosses Harris Fork Creek, veers away from the state line, and meets the west end of KY 129, which takes over State Line Avenue. KY 116 continues on Lake Street one block east to the route's end at KY 307, which heads south on Commercial Avenue to the state line and east along Lake Street.

== KY 117 ==
Kentucky Route 117
- Location: Oak Grove–Gracey
- Length: 18.974 mi (30.536 km)

Kentucky Route 117 is a 18.974-mile-long (30.536 km) rural secondary highway in southern Christian County. The highway begins at US 41 Alt. (Fort Campbell Boulevard) north of Fort Campbell on the west edge of the city of Oak Grove. KY 117 heads west along Herndon–Oak Grove Road, which intersects KY 345 (Palmyra Road) north of Howel. The highway curves northwest and intersects KY 107 (Lafayette Road) at Herndon. KY 117 continues northwest along Gracey–Herndon Road, which crosses the Little River and intersects KY 695 (Cox Mill Road). The highway intersects KY 164 (Newstead Road) at Newstead before meeting I-24 at a diamond interchange. KY 117 intersects KY 272 (Julien Road) and crosses Sinking Fork at Julien before reaching its northern terminus at KY 3186 (Tobacco Road) at Gracey.

== KY 124 ==
Kentucky Route 124
- Location: Cadiz–Bainbridge
- Length: 14.896 mi (23.973 km)

Kentucky Route 124 is a 14.896-mile-long (23.973 km) rural secondary highway in northern Trigg County and western Christian County. The highway begins at KY 139 (Jefferson Street) in the city of Cadiz. KY 124 heads northeast out of town on Cerulean Road, which crosses over I-24 and intersects KY 276 (Rocky Ridge Road) and KY 128 (Wallonia Road). The highway crosses Horse Creek and enters the village of Cerulean, where the highway runs concurrently with KY 126 (Buffalo–Cerulean Road) along Main Street; the two routes meet the west end of KY 624 (Cerulean–Hopkinsville Road). KY 124 splits from KY 126 (Cobb Road), once again on Cerulean Road, which crosses the Muddy Fork of the Little River before entering Christian County, where the highway veers east onto Sugar Creek Road. The highway crosses Wallace Fork and Sugar Creek before reaching its terminus at KY 91 (Princeton Road) at Bainbridge.

== KY 126 ==
Kentucky Route 126
- Location: Buffalo–Hopson
- Length: 13.333 mi (21.457 km)

Kentucky Route 126 is a 13.333-mile-long (21.457 km) rural secondary highway in eastern Trigg County and southern Caldwell County. The highway begins at KY 128 (Wallonia Road) north of Buffalo. KY 126 heads northwest along Buffalo–Cerulean Road, which crosses Horse Creek on its way to Cerulean. There, the highway runs concurrently with KY 124 (Cerulean Road) along Main Street; the two routes meet the west end of KY 624 (Cerulean–Hopkinsville Road). KY 126 splits from KY 124 (Cerulean Road) northwest onto Cobb Road, which crosses the Muddy Fork Branch of the Little River and Brushy Grove Creek before entering Caldwell County. At Cobb, the highway has a four-legged intersection with NY 128, which heads south onto Wallonia Road, and KY 672, which heads north. KY 126 and KY 128 head northwest and cross Burns Creek, Dreen Creek, and Kenady Creek and meet the north end of KY 514 before diverging south of Otter Pond. KY 126 continues west across Cantrell Creek and Dry Creek to its terminus at KY 139 (Cadiz Road) north of Hopson.

== KY 128 ==
Kentucky Route 128
- Location: Buffalo–Princeton
- Length: 20.986 mi (33.774 km)

Kentucky Route 128 is a 20.986-mile-long (33.774 km) rural secondary highway in eastern Trigg County and southern Caldwell County. The highway begins at US 68 and KY 80 (Hopkinsville Road) south of Buffalo. KY 128 heads northwest along Wallonia Road. North of Buffalo, the highway meets the south end of KY 128 (Buffalo–Cerulean Road) and the north end of KY 1507 (Barefield Road). KY 128 intersects KY 124 (Cerulean Road) east of Wallonia, where the route runs concurrently with KY 276 (Rocky Ridge Road and Blackhawk Road) across the Muddy Creek Fork of the Little River. The highway heads north into Caldwell County where, at Cobb, the highway has a four-legged intersection with KY 126, which heads east, and KY 672, which heads north. KY 126 and KY 128 head northwest and cross Burns Creek, Dreen Creek, and Kenady Creek and meet the north end of KY 514 before diverging south of Otter Pond. KY 128 heads north through Otter Pond, crosses Dry Creek and Wade Branch, passes through McGowan, and meets the end of the short spur route KY 2068. The highway crosses Goose Creek and intersects the Paducah & Louisville Railway before reaching its northern terminus at KY 91 (Hopkinsville Road) southeast of the city of Princeton.

== KY 129 ==
Kentucky Route 129
- Location: Fulton–Stubblefield
- Length: 19.060 mi (30.674 km)

Kentucky Route 129 is a 19.060-mile-long (30.674 km) L-shaped rural secondary highway on the southern rim of Fulton, Hickman, and Graves counties, much of which runs atop the Kentucky–Tennessee state line. The highway begins at KY 116 just north of the state line in the city of Fulton, Kentucky. KY 116 heads west as State Line Avenue and east as Lake Street; KY 129 heads east on State Line Avenue, which immediately curves southeast back to the state line and runs along the south side of Pontotoc Park. At the southeast corner of the park, the highway intersects a street that heads north as KY 307 (Commercial Avenue) in Fulton and south as Tennessee State Route 43 (Broadway Street) into South Fulton, Tennessee. KY 129 heads east out of the city along State Line Road and meets the southern end of KY 2150. The highway meets the south end of KY 1218 (Reed Road) at the Fulton–Hickman county line.

KY 129 crosses Croft Creek in its mile-long (1.61 km) jaunt through Hickman County. In Graves County, the highway meets the south end of KY 943 and follows the state line to a four-way intersection in the hamlet of Dukedom. State Line Road continues east as a county highway, Tennessee State Route 118 heads south into that state, and KY 129 heads north away from the state line. The highway crosses Blackamore Creek on its way to Pilot Oak, where the route briefly runs concurrently with KY 94. KY 129 intersects KY 2422 between its crossings of Brush Creek and Barn Creek. The route continues north to its terminus at KY 339 at Stubblefield.

== KY 133 ==
Kentucky Route 133
- Location: Salem–Joy
- Length: 19.166 mi (30.845 km)

Kentucky Route 133 is a 19.166-mile-long (30.845 km) rural secondary highway in northern Livingston County. The highway begins on Shelby Road south of Padon Road south of the city of Salem. KY 133 heads northwest across Dry Creek and Cox Spring Branch to the city, where the route runs concurrently with US 60 on Main Street; the two highways intersect KY 723 (Hayden Avenue) in the center of town. On the west side of Salem, KY 133 diverges onto Lola Road, which crosses Sandy Creek, Deer Creek, and Foreman Creek before intersecting KY 838 (Hampton Road) at Lola. The highway veers west at the south end of the eastern segment of KY 137 (Bethel Hill Road) and crosses Turkey Creek. KY 133 continues west through Joy, where the route crosses Buck Creek and runs concurrently with KY 135. The highway meets the north end of KY 1436 (Pisgah Road) and crosses McGilligan Creek before reaching its terminus at the western segment of KY 137 (River Road) east of the Ohio River.

== KY 134 ==
Kentucky Route 134
- Location: Adele–Elsie
- Length: 11.818 mi (19.019 km)

Kentucky Route 134 is a 11.818-mile-long (19.019 km) rural secondary highway in southern Morgan County and western Magoffin County. The highway begins at KY 191 at Adele. KY 134 heads east parallel to the Mountain Parkway. The highway receives an exit ramp from the westbound parkway, passes under the parkway, and emits an entrance ramp to the eastbound parkway. KY 134 then leaves the parkway to follow a creek to a summit and drop into the valley of another creek. The highway passes under the parkway again and parallels the parkway through the valley of Johnson Creek into Magoffin County. KY 134 passes through the hamlets of Netty, Epson, and Hager and meets the spur routes KY 3049 (Long Branch of Johnson Road) at Epson and KY 3047 (Left Johnson Fork Road) between Epson and Hager. The highway passes under the Mountain Parkway twice more before the route intersects KY 134 Connector, a very short two-way ramp between the parallel highways. KY 134 diverges from the parkway at Kernie and follows Johnson Creek downstream to the Licking River, which the route crosses immediately before reaching its eastern terminus at US 460 and KY 7 west of Elsie.

== KY 135 ==
Kentucky Route 135
- Location: Burna–Tolu
- Length: 26.263 mi (42.266 km)

Kentucky Route 135 is a 26.263-mile-long (42.266 km) L-shaped rural secondary highway in northern Livingston County and northern Crittenden County. The highway begins at US 60 at Burna. KY 135 heads north on Carrsville Road, which crosses Bayou Creek and meets the west end of KY 838 (Hampton Road) at Hampton. The highway meets the west end of KY 1608 (Maxfield Road) and briefly runs concurrently with KY 133 (Lola Road) at Joy. KY 135 crosses Long Branch and continues north toward the Ohio River until the riverside city of Carrsville. The highway enters the city on Vine Street, turns east on Church Street, turns north on Main Street for one block, then leaves the city on Tolu Road, which follows the shore of the Ohio River. KY 135 crosses Buck Creek, meets the north end of the eastern segment of KY 137 (Bethel Hill Road), and leaves the river and crosses Deer Creek into Crittenden County. The highway meets the north end of KY 297 and crosses Spring Creek on the way to Tolu, where the route meets the north end of KY 723 and crosses Caney Creek. KY 135 meets the north end of KY 1668 and crosses Hurricane Creek before reaching its terminus at KY 91 south of that route's ferry to Cave-in-Rock, Illinois.

== KY 137 ==
Kentucky Route 137
- Location: Carrsville–Lola; Smithland–northwest of Carrsville
- Length: 24.398 mi (39.265 km)

Kentucky Route 137 is a 24.398-mile-long (39.265 km) highway with two segments in northern Livingston County. The eastern segment is a 4.645-mile-long (7.475 km) supplemental road that extends from KY 135 (Tolu Road) in Carrsville southeast to KY 133 (Lola Road) west of Lola. The western segment is a 19.753-mile-long (31.789 km) rural secondary highway that follows River Road along the Ohio River along the northwest side of the county. The western KY 137 begins at US 60 north of Smithland. The highway passes through Birdsville south of Phelps Creek and through Bayou between its junction with KY 763 (McMurray Road) and its bridge across Bayou Creek. KY 137 meets the west end of KY 1436 (Pisgah Road) and crosses McGilligan Creek. The highway turns east to cross Cave Spring Branch, turns north again at its junction with KY 133 (Lola Road), and crosses Givens Creek. KY 137 curves east along with the river before reaching its northern terminus at the end of state maintenance northwest of Carrsville; the road continues as county-maintained Stallion Road to a dead end.

== KY 140 ==
Kentucky Route 140
- Location: Poverty–Red Hill
- Length: 10.156 mi (16.344 km)

Kentucky Route 140 is a 10.156-mile-long (16.344 km) highway with rural secondary and supplemental road sections in western McLean County and southern Daviess County. The highway begins at KY 256 at Poverty. KY 140 heads north as a supplemental road that has an immediate junction with KY 1792 then no further state route junctions until the route has a brief concurrency with KY 136. KY 140 splits east from KY 136 as a rural secondary highway that meets the south end of KY 2156 south of Cleopatra and intersects KY 815 at Guffie. The highway intersects KY 81 at Glenville and meets the north ends of KY 1046 and KY 798 before entering Daviess County. KY 140 crosses a branch of Rhodes Creek, meets the east end of KY 1207 at Utica, and intersects US 431. The highway crosses Twomile Creek west of Red Hill before reaching its eastern terminus at US 231.

== KY 141 ==
Kentucky Route 141
- Location: Sullivan–Uniontown
- Length: 26.083 mi (41.977 km)

Kentucky Route 141 is a 26.083-mile-long (41.977 km) C-shaped rural secondary highway in eastern Union County. The highway begins at US 60 and KY 109 at Sullivan. KY 141 heads northeast, meets the east end of KY 923, and crosses Hazel Branch and Wynn Ditch. The highway briefly runs concurrently with KY 270 across Bishop Ditch south of Pride, where the route meets an end of KY 2090 and intersect KY 758. KY 141 meets the north end of KY 2153 north of Lake Moffitt and passes along the edge of Higginson-Henry Wildlife Management Area on either side of Boxville, where the route intersects KY 56. North of Boxville, the highway curves northwest and crosses a branch of Highland Creek and Casey Creek on its way to Waverly. Southwest of the city, KY 141 meets the west end of KY 2094 (Old Highway 60) and heads away from the city concurrently with US 60 to St. Vincent, where the state highway diverges northwest. The highway intersects KY 359, meets the west end of KY 1179, and crosses a branch of Lost Creek before reaching its northern terminus at KY 130 (Airline Road) south of Uniontown.

== KY 142 ==
Kentucky Route 142
- Location: Masonville–Ensor
- Length: 11.191 mi (18.010 km)

Kentucky Route 142 is a 11.191-mile-long (18.010 km) rural secondary highway in eastern Daviess County. The highway begins at US 231 south of Masonville. KY 142 heads north and crosses over I-165 (Natcher Parkway) and meets the north end of KY 762 at Habit. The highway crosses several branches of the North Fork of Panther Creek before reaching KY 54 at Philpot. The two highways run concurrently west, then KY 142 splits north. KY 142 crosses Burnett Fork before reaching its northern terminus at KY 144 at Ensor.

== KY 143 ==
Kentucky Route 143
- Location: Clay–West Wheatcroft
- Length: 13.202 mi (21.247 km)

Kentucky Route 143 is a 13.202-mile-long (21.247 km) supplemental road in western Webster County. The highway begins at KY 109 south of Clay. KY 143 heads west and meets the south end of KY 1672 as the former route intersects a rail line. The highway continues west to KY 132 and runs concurrently southwest with that highway; the two routes cross a branch of Crab Orchard Creek. KY 143 diverges northwest from KY 132 and crosses Crab Orchard Creek. The highway passes through the village of Blackford, where the route passes through several right-angle curves and meets the south end of KY 2069 (Third Street). KY 143 heads northeast and crosses Vaughn Ditch on its way to its northern terminus at KY 109 west of West Wheatcroft.

== KY 145 ==
Kentucky Route 145
- Location: Poole–Corydon
- Length: 8.412 mi (13.538 km)

Kentucky Route 145 is a 8.412-mile-long (13.538 km) rural secondary highway in far northern Webster County and western Henderson County. The highway begins at a four-legged intersection with US 41 Alt. and KY 56 in the village of Poole just south of the Webster–Henderson county line. From the intersection, US 41 Alt. and KY 56 head south concurrently, KY 52 heads east, US 41 Alt. heads north, and KY 145 heads northwest. KY 145 meets the west end of KY 2253 (Cairo–Dixie Road) at Dixie and crosses Beaverdam Creek. The highway enters the city of Corydon on Seventh Street and reaches its northern terminus at US 60 (Main Street).

== KY 147 ==
Kentucky Route 147
- Location: Elmwood–Onton
- Length: 3.453 mi (5.557 km)

Kentucky Route 147 is a 3.453-mile-long (5.557 km) rural secondary highway in eastern Webster County. The highway begins at US 41 east of Elmwood. KY 147 heads east, passes under I-69 (Pennyrile Parkway), crosses a branch of Pitman Creek, and reaches its terminus at KY 370 at Onton.

Prior to 1950, KY 147 continued south to US 41 (now US 41 Alt.) in Madisonville, but this section became part of rerouted US 41.

== KY 148 ==
Kentucky Route 148
- Location: Louisville–Southville
- Length: 17.264 mi (27.784 km)

Kentucky Route 148 is a 17.264-mile-long (27.784 km) rural secondary highway in eastern Jefferson County and southern Shelby County. The highway begins at KY 155, which heads west as Taylorsville Road and southeast as Taylorsville Lake Road, in the rural Fisherville neighborhood of the city of Louisville. KY 1531 heads southeast concurrently with KY 155 and east concurrently with KY 148 along Taylorsville Road, parallel to a Norfolk Southern Railway line. The two highways cross Floyds Fork before KY 1531 diverges north onto Eastwood Fisherville Road. KY 148 crosses Brush Run in the rural neighborhood of Clark Station before veering away from the railroad as the route leaves the city of Louisville and enters Shelby County, where the highway follows Fisherville Road. The highway crosses Plum Creek and Buck Creek on its way to Finchville, where the route intersects KY 55 (Taylorsville Road) and continues as Finchville Road. KY 148 crosses Brashears Creek and meets the south end of KY 2861 (Zaring Mill Road) at Olive Branch. The highway crosses Guist Creek before reaching its eastern terminus at KY 44 (Southville Pike) west of Southville.

== KY 149 ==
Kentucky Route 149
- Location: Garrard–Eriline
- Length: 10.640 mi (17.123 km)

Kentucky Route 149 is a 10.640-mile-long (17.123 km) rural secondary highway in eastern Clay County. The highway begins at US 421 and KY 80 southeast of Garrard. KY 149 heads east along Lockards Creek Road through the valley of the eponymous stream to its headwaters at Hector Gap. The highway descends into the valley of Hector Branch, where the highway passes under then parallels the Hal Rogers Parkway along Hector Road. At Hector, KY 149 meets the north end of KY 873 (Elk Mountain Road) just west of that route's intersection with the parkway. The highway leaves Hector Branch and the Hal Rogers Parkway and crosses a ridge into the valley of the Red Bird River, which the highway crosses just before its eastern terminus at KY 66 northwest of Eriline.

=== History ===
KY 149 was formed between 1950 and 1955.

The original KY 149 ran from KY 56 in Sebree south to KY 147; this became part of US 41 (which was rerouted east), which also replaced the section of KY 147 from there to Madisonville.

== KY 156 ==
Kentucky Route 156
- Location: Tilton–Goddard
- Length: 7.813 mi (12.574 km)

Kentucky Route 156 is a 7.813-mile-long (12.574 km) rural secondary highway in southern Fleming County. The highway begins at KY 11 (Mt. Sterling Road) north of Tilton. KY 156 heads east along Poplar Plains Road, which intersects KY 2081 (Tilton Road). The highway continues east through an intersection with KY 697 (Bald Hill Road) at Bald Hill, KY 1515 (Orchard Road), and KY 111 (Hillsboro Road) at Poplar Plains. KY 156 reaches its eastern terminus at KY 32 (Morehead Road) north of Goddard.

== KY 157 ==
Kentucky Route 157
- Location: Sligo–New Castle
- Length: 9.770 mi (15.723 km)

Kentucky Route 157 is a 9.770-mile-long (15.723 km) rural secondary highway in western Henry County. The highway begins at US 42 at the Henry–Trimble county line north of Sligo. KY 157 heads east on Sulphur Road on top of the county line. The highway fully enters Henry County and crosses the Little Kentucky River into the village of Sulphur, where the route runs concurrently north with KY 1606 (Fallen Timber Road) parallel with a CSX rail line. At a four-way intersection at the north end of the village next to the confluence of White Sulphur Creek with the Little Kentucky River, KY 1608 continues north, KY 3175 (Sulphur–Bedford Road) heads west, and KY 157 heads east on Sulphur Road, which immediately KY 157 continues southeast to its terminus at KY 146 (La Grange Road) just west of the city of New Castle.

== KY 158 ==
Kentucky Route 158
- Location: Sunset–Hilda
- Length: 13.983 mi (22.503 km)

Kentucky Route 158 is a 13.983-mile-long (22.503 km) highway with rural secondary and supplemental road sections in southern Fleming County and western Rowan County. The highway begins as a supplemental road from the intersection of East Sorrell Lane and Harmon Lane near the Licking River south of Sunset. KY 158 follows Sunset Road north through Sunset and then east to KY 111 (Hillsboro Road) at Hillsboro. The highway continues southeast as a rural secondary highway named Ringos Mill Road, which meets the west end of KY 1013 (Watson Road). At Farmville, KY 158 crosses Fox Creek and meets the west end of KY 1895 (Maxey Flats Road). The highway meets the east end of KY 3304 at Rock Lick Creek and meets the north end of KY 801 at Sharkey at the Fleming–Rowan county line. KY 158 follows Sharkey Road to its eastern terminus just east of Little Brushey Creek at KY 32 (Flemingsburg Road) at the north end of the village of Hilda.

== KY 161 ==
Kentucky Route 161
- Location: Flemingsburg Junction–Weedonia
- Length: 4.904 mi (7.892 km)

Kentucky Route 161 is a 4.904-mile-long (7.892 km) rural secondary highway in northern Fleming County and southern Mason County. The highway begins at KY 170 (Junction Road) at Flemingsburg Junction. KY 161 immediately intersects the Transkentucky Transportation Railroad and heads west and north along Shanklin Road. The highway meets the north end of KY 888 (Buffalo Trace Road) before entering Mason County. KY 161 follows Flemingsburg–Mays Lick Road, which crosses Mill Creek before reaching its northern terminus at KY 324 east of Mays Lick.

== KY 162 ==
Kentucky Route 162
- Location: East Bardstown–Bloomfield
- Length: 8.157 mi (13.127 km)

Kentucky Route 162 is a 8.157-mile-long (13.127 km) rural secondary highway in eastern Nelson County. The highway begins at US 62 (Bloomfield Road) in East Bardstown. The highway heads northeast along Old Bloomfield Road, which crosses Cox Creek and later follows the valley of the West Fork of Simpson Creek before crosses that stream. KY 162 crosses Camp Charity Creek before entering the city of Bloomfield and reaching its eastern terminus at KY 48 (Fairfield Road).

== KY 167 ==
Kentucky Route 167
- Location: Mount Pisgah–Monticello
- Length: 20.037 mi (32.246 km)

Kentucky Route 167 is a 20.037-mile-long (32.246 km) rural secondary highway in southern Wayne County. The highway begins at the Tennessee state line very close to the Wayne–McCreary county line; the road continues south as Tennessee State Route 154. KY 167 heads north into the valley of Little South Fork, where the route passes through Mount Pisgah. The highway leaves that valley and descends to the valley of Beaver Creek. KY 167 follows the creek through Sumpter, where it meets the south end of KY 1258, to Cooper. The highway ascends to Wray Gap then into the valley of Isbell Branch of Beaver Creek. KY 167 meets the east end of KY 200 at Number One. The highway crosses Elk Spring Creek into the city of Monticello and reaches its northern terminus at KY 90 Bus. (Main Street).

== KY 170 ==
Kentucky Route 170
- Location: Hill Top–Helena
- Length: 12.424 mi (19.994 km)

Kentucky Route 170 is a 12.424-mile-long (19.994 km) rural secondary highway in western Fleming County and southern Mason County. The highway begins at KY 1325 (Three Mile Road) east of Hill Top. KY 170 heads west along Energy Road, which crosses Cord Creek on its way to Hill Top, where the route meets the north end of KY 1347 (Hilltop Road). The highway continues north on Hilltop Road, which crosses Fleming Creek on its way to Elizaville, where the route intersects KY 32 (Elizaville Road), meets the south end of KY 367 (Nepton Road), and crosses Mud Lick Creek. KY 170 continues north along Junction Road, which parallels the Transkentucky Transportation Railroad and Johnson Creek and meets the west end of KY 559 (Convict Pike). At Flemingsburg Junction, the highway meets the south end of KY 161 (Shanklin Road) and the west end of KY 880 (Kelley Pike). KY 170 veers away from the railroad at the Fleming–Mason county line and reaches its northern terminus at KY 324 (Helena Road) west of Helena.

== KY 171 ==
Kentucky Route 171
- Location: Claymour–Greenville
- Length: 28.302 mi (45.548 km)

Kentucky Route 171 is a 28.302-mile-long (45.548 km) rural secondary highway in northern Todd County and southern Muhlenberg County. The highway begins at KY 106 (Sharon Grove Road) southwest of Claymour. KY 171 heads west along Allegre Road, which intersects KY 181 (Greenville Road) before curving north. The highway meets the east end of KY 508 (Liberty–Britmart Road) at Liberty and at Allegre intersects KY 507, which heads west along Pilot Rock Road and east along Highland Lick Road. KY 171 crosses the Shelton Branch of the Pond River south of Mount Tabor and Horse Creek south of Kirkmansville, where the route intersects KY 107 (Clifty–Kirkmansville Road). The highway continues along Weir Road, which crosses the Pond River before crossing the Todd–Muhlenberg county line. KY 171 crosses a pair of branches of Caney Creek and the main creek itself before meeting the west end of KY 831. The highway has consecutive junctions with the east and west ends of KY 853 and KY 600, respectively, before crossing Long Creek south of Weir. KY 171 meets the east end of KY 1473 at its crossing of Pond Creek. The highway enters the city of Greenville along Weir Street before reaching its northern terminus at US 62 (Hopkinsville Street).

== KY 174 ==
Kentucky Route 174
- Location: Hays Crossing–Clark Hill
- Length: 11.378 mi (18.311 km)

Kentucky Route 174 is a 11.378-mile-long (18.311 km) rural secondary highway in eastern Rowan County and western Carter County. The highway begins at US 60 at Hays Crossing. KY 174 heads east along Haldeman Road, which follows the valley of Triplett Creek, meets the north end of KY 3318 (Open Fork Road), and passes through Haldeman at the creek's headwaters. The highway enters Carter County and enters the valley of Soldier Fork. KY 174 meets the east end of KY 3296 (Trumbo Hill Road) and the south end of KY 1626 (Dry Branch Road) at Soldier. The highway passes through Hayward and Enterprise and meets the north end of KY 955 at Silica. KY 174 continues along Jacobs Fork through Lawton and Limestone and curves north at its junction with KY 1620. The highway crosses Garvin Branch and follows Tygarts Creek until the route crosses the creek to its eastern terminus at US 60 at Clark Hill.

== KY 175 ==
Kentucky Route 175
- Location: Bancroft–Stroud
- Length: 28.247 mi (45.459 km)

Kentucky Route 175 is an L-shaped, 28.247-mile-long (45.459 km) rural secondary highway in western and northern Muhlenberg County. The highway begins at KY 189 at Bancroft. KY 175 heads northwest from KY 189 and crosses a Branch of Elk Pond Creek and Thompson Creek on its way to US 62. The two highways head east concurrently, then KY 175 splits north and meets the Western Kentucky Parkway at a modified diamond interchange, within which the route crosses Thompson Creek again. The eastbound parkway ramps form half the diamond; the westbound parkway ramps are accessed via KY 2693 (Graham Cypress Road). KY 175 continues north across Thompson Creek and through the village of Graham, north of which it meets the west end of KY 602. The highway passes through Peabody Wildlife Management Area, at the north end of which the route heads east concurrently with KY 70. North of KY 70, KY 175 intersects at grade the Paducah & Louisville Railway, meets the west end of KY 2551, and crosses Briar Creek. The highway veers east at Stringtown at its junction with KY 423. KY 175 crosses Log Creek and intersects KY 181 shortly before meeting KY 81 north of Bremen. Just north of where the two highways intersect a CSX rail line, KY 175 turns east and parallels the rail line. The highway veers away from the rail line. KY 175 crosses Cypress Creek and intersects an abandoned Louisville and Nashville Railroad line before reaching its northern terminus at US 431 south of Stroud.

== KY 179 ==
Kentucky Route 179
- Location: Louellen–Cumberland
- Length: 8.050 mi (12.955 km)

Kentucky Route 179 is a 8.050-mile-long (12.955 km) rural secondary highway in eastern Harlan County. The highway begins at KY 38 at Louellen in the valley of Clover Fork. KY 179 heads northeast along Slope Hollow Road, which follows Fugitt Creek to its headwaters. The highway follows a ridge before it descends to the valley of Cloverlick Creek, which the route crosses immediately before its intersection with KY 2006, where the route enters the city of Cumberland. KY 179 passes Southeast Kentucky Community and Technical College and meets the south end of KY 2179 before reaching its northern terminus at US 119. The road was formed by 1977.

The original KY 179 followed Church Street and Vine Street from US 31W through Oakland to US 68/KY 80. This was removed by 1976.

== KY 183 ==
Kentucky Route 183
- Location: Brownsville
- Length: 1.284 mi (2.066 km)

Kentucky Route 183 is a 1.284-mile-long (2.066 km) rural secondary highway in central Edmonson County. The highway begins at KY 70 and KY 259 on the north side of the city of Brownsville. KY 183 follows Lock Road, which heads west and curves south and east to pass under KY 70 and KY 259's bridge across the Green River. The highway heads east to road end at the former site of Green River Lock and Dam No. 6.

== KY 184 ==
Kentucky Route 184
- Location: Carson
- Length: 6.253 mi (10.063 km)

Kentucky Route 184 is a 6.253-mile-long (10.063 km) rural secondary highway in far eastern Carroll County and western Gallatin County. The highway begins at KY 47 north of Carson and just west of the Carroll–Gallatin county line. KY 184 enters Gallatin County and follows Walnut Valley Road, which crosses a branch of Lick Creek and then follows Stephens Creek to the route's northern terminus at US 42 west of Ethridge.

=== History ===
The road was formed between 1955 and 1957.

KY 184 was originally designated from KY 59 near Kinnickonick to KY 2 in Carter; this became part of KY 24 between 1945 and 1950, and is now KY 474.

Another KY 184 was designated by 1950 as a renumbering of part of KY 204 from KY 190 near Frakes to KY 74. This route was decommissioned between 1955 and 1957, and is now KY 3485.

== KY 188 ==
Kentucky Route 188
- Location: Meldrum–Colmar
- Length: 4.066 mi (6.544 km)

Kentucky Route 188 is a 4.066-mile-long (6.544 km) rural secondary highway in central Bell County. The highway begins at US 25E at Meldrum. KY 188 heads east through the narrow valley of Yellow Creek. The highway crosses the creek and crosses Clear Fork at its junction with KY 988. KY 188 follows Clear Fork north to KY 516, then the highway turns east toward its dead end at Cranes Creek at Colmar.

== KY 193 ==
Kentucky Route 193
- Location: New Castle–Port Royal
- Length: 9.578 mi (15.414 km)

Kentucky Route 193 is a 9.578-mile-long (15.414 km) rural secondary highway in northern Henry County. The highway begins at US 421 (Campbellsburg Road) north of New Castle. KY 193 heads northeast on Port Royal Road, which crosses Emily Run Creek on the way to Lacie, where the route meets the east end of KY 3321 (Lacie Road). The highway continues through a brief concurrency with KY 574 (Turners Station Road and Maddox Ridge Road) and meets the south end of KY 1361 (Vance Road). KY 193 passes through Port Royal before reaching its northern terminus at an acute intersection with KY 389 (River Road) next to the Kentucky River.

== KY 196 ==
Kentucky Route 196
- Location: Jabez–Nancy
- Length: 17.143 mi (27.589 km)

Kentucky Route 196 is a 17.143-mile-long (27.589 km) rural secondary highway in northern Wayne County, eastern Russell County, and western Pulaski County. The highway begins at 4-H Camp Road on the Union Ridge peninsula near Lake Cumberland. KY 196 crosses the Wayne–Russell county line and turns northeast at Jabez, where the route meets the east end of KY 3277. The highway passes through the hamlet of Vinnie at the Russell–Pulaski county line. KY 196 continues northeast to Faubush, where the route heads east across Sputter Branch and meets the north end of KY 1664 at Brunetta. The highway crosses White Oak Creek before reaching its eastern terminus at KY 80 at Nancy.

== KY 198 ==
Kentucky Route 198
- Location: Yosemite–Turnersville
- Length: 12.524 mi (20.155 km)

Kentucky Route 198 is a 12.524-mile-long (20.155 km) rural secondary highway in eastern Casey County and western Lincoln County. The highway begins at KY 70 at Yosemite. KY 198 crosses Knob Lick Creek and the Green River on its way to Middleburg. There, the highway meets the south end of KY 3196 (College Street) and the east end of KY 1552 (Short Town Road). KY 198 crosses McCann branch and meets the west ends of KY 3270 and KY 698 before entering Lincoln County. The highway passes through Mount Salem and crosses Pine Lick Creek on its way to McKinney. At McKinney, KY 198 turns north, turns east to cross over Norfolk Southern Railway's Louisville District rail line, and turns north again at the north end of KY 1778. The highway crosses over Peyton Creek and several tributaries of the creek on its way to its northern terminus at KY 78 at Turnersville.
