= Akersville, Kentucky =

Akersville
- Unincorporated community
- Location within the state of Kentucky Akersville (the United States)
- Coordinates: 36°38′51.19″N 85°56′15.93″W
- Country: United States
- State: Kentucky
- County: Butler
- Established: 1882
- Elevation: 778 ft (237 m)
- Time zone: UTC-6 (Central (CST))
  - Summer (DST): UTC-5 (CDT)
- Area code(s): 270 and 364
- GNIS feature ID

Akersville is an unincorporated community located in southwestern Monroe County in south central Kentucky.

== History ==
The name of this community may have been originated from the name of a local merchant. The post office, which was originally named Slowgo, operated from 1882 until 1956; its current name was adopted in 1885.

== Geography ==
The community is located about 13 miles (21 km) west-southwest of Tompkinsville, the Monroe County seat. It Is located along Kentucky Route 87 (Akersville Road), which connects the area to Lafayette, Tennessee to the southwest and Fountain Run to the north.
