= Stanfill =

Stanfill is a surname. Notable people with the surname include:

- Bill Stanfill (born 1947), American football player
- Dennis Carothers Stanfill, American businessman and philanthropist
- Kristian Stanfill (born 1983), American singer-songwriter
- Louis Stanfill (born 1985), American rugby player
- William A. Stanfill (1892–1971), American politician

== See also ==
- Stanfill, Kentucky, unincorporated community in Harlan County, Kentucky, United States
