= Hampton, Kentucky =

Unincorporated community in Kentucky, United States

- Unincorporated community
- Location in Kentucky Location in the United States
- Coordinates: 37°16′48″N 88°22′25″W
- Country: United States
- State: Kentucky
- County: Livingston
- Elevation: 541 ft (165 m)
- Time zone: UTC-6 (Central (CST))
  - Summer (DST): UTC-5 (CST)
- ZIP codes: 42047
- GNIS feature ID: 2629625

Hampton is an unincorporated community in northern Livingston County, Kentucky, United States. The community is on Kentucky Route 135 approximately 13 miles (21 km) south of Carrsville and the Ohio River.
