= Carrsville, Kentucky =

- City
- Location in Livingston County, Kentucky
- Coordinates: 37°23′53″N 88°22′30″W
- Country: United States
- State: Kentucky
- County: Livingston

Area
  - Total: 0.066 sq mi (0.17 km^{2})
  - Land: 0.066 sq mi (0.17 km^{2})
  - Water: 0 sq mi (0.00 km^{2})
- Elevation: 371 ft (113 m)

Population (2020)
  - Total: 48
  - Density: 737.0/sq mi (284.57/km^{2})
- Time zone: UTC-6 (Central (CST))
  - Summer (DST): UTC-5 (CDT)
- ZIP code: 42081
- Area codes: 270 & 364
- FIPS code: 21-13060
- GNIS feature ID: 2404001

Carrsville is a home rule-class city beside the Ohio River in Livingston County, Kentucky, in the United States. The population was 50 at the 2010 census, declining from 64 as of 2000. It is part of the Paducah, KY-IL Metropolitan Statistical Area. It is situated just west of the junction of where Buck Creek empties into the Ohio River.

== Geography ==
Carrsville is located in northern Livingston County at 37°23′53″N 88°22′30″W (37.398063, -88.375113). To the north, across the Ohio River, is Hardin County, Illinois. The nearest river crossing is the Cave-In-Rock Ferry 13 miles (21 km) upstream (east). The nearest bridges over the Ohio are the Shawneetown Bridge 36 miles (58 km) upriver at Old Shawneetown, Illinois, and the Brookport Bridge 43 miles (69 km) downriver at Paducah.

Kentucky Route 135 passes through Carrsville, leading east 14 miles (23 km) to Kentucky Route 91 near the Cave-In-Rock Ferry, and south 12 miles (19 km) to U.S. Route 60 at Burna.

According to the United States Census Bureau, Carrsville has a total area of 0.07 square miles (0.17 km^{2}), all land.

== Name ==
Carrsville was named for Billy Karr, who laid out the town c. 1840.

== Demographics ==
Historical population
Census	Pop.	Note	%±
1880	178		—
1890	240		34.8%
1900	278		15.8%
1910	298		7.2%
1920	323		8.4%
1930	300		−7.1%
1940	243		−19.0%
1950	205		−15.6%
1960	166		−19.0%
1970	110		−33.7%
1980	99		−10.0%
1990	98		−1.0%
2000	64		−34.7%
2010	50		−21.9%
2020	48		−4.0%
U.S. Decennial Census

As of the census of 2000, there were 64 people, 35 households, and 17 families residing in the city. The population density was 367.7 inhabitants per square mile (142.0/km^{2}). There were 51 housing units at an average density of 293.0 per square mile (113.1/km^{2}). The racial makeup of the city was 96.88% White, and 3.12% from two or more races.

There were 35 households, out of which 11.4% had children under the age of 18 living with them, 40.0% were married couples living together, 2.9% had a female householder with no husband present, and 51.4% were non-families. 48.6% of all households were made up of individuals, and 20.0% had someone living alone who was 65 years of age or older. The average household size was 1.83 and the average family size was 2.53.

In the city, the population was spread out, with 14.1% under the age of 18, 3.1% from 18 to 24, 28.1% from 25 to 44, 29.7% from 45 to 64, and 25.0% who were 65 years of age or older. The median age was 48 years. For every 100 females, there were 146.2 males. For every 100 females age 18 and over, there were 129.2 males.

The median income for a household in the city was $21,500, and the median income for a family was $26,250. Males had a median income of $41,250 versus $13,750 for females. The per capita income for the city was $15,289. There were 12.5% of families and 9.3% of the population living below the poverty line, including no under eighteens and 31.3% of those over 64.

== See also ==
- List of cities and towns along the Ohio River
