= History of Salem =

History of Salem may refer to:

== India ==
- History of Salem, Tamil Nadu

== USA ==
- History of Salem, Indiana
- History of Salem, Iowa
- History of Salem, Kentucky
- History of Salem, Massachusetts
- History of Salem, Missouri
- History of Salem, New Jersey
- History of Salem, Ohio
- History of Salem, Oregon
- History of Salem, South Dakota
- History of Salem, Utah
- History of Salem, Virginia
- History of Salem, West Virginia
