= Mantle Rock Archeological District =

Historic district in Kentucky, United States

- U.S. National Register of Historic Places
- U.S. Historic district
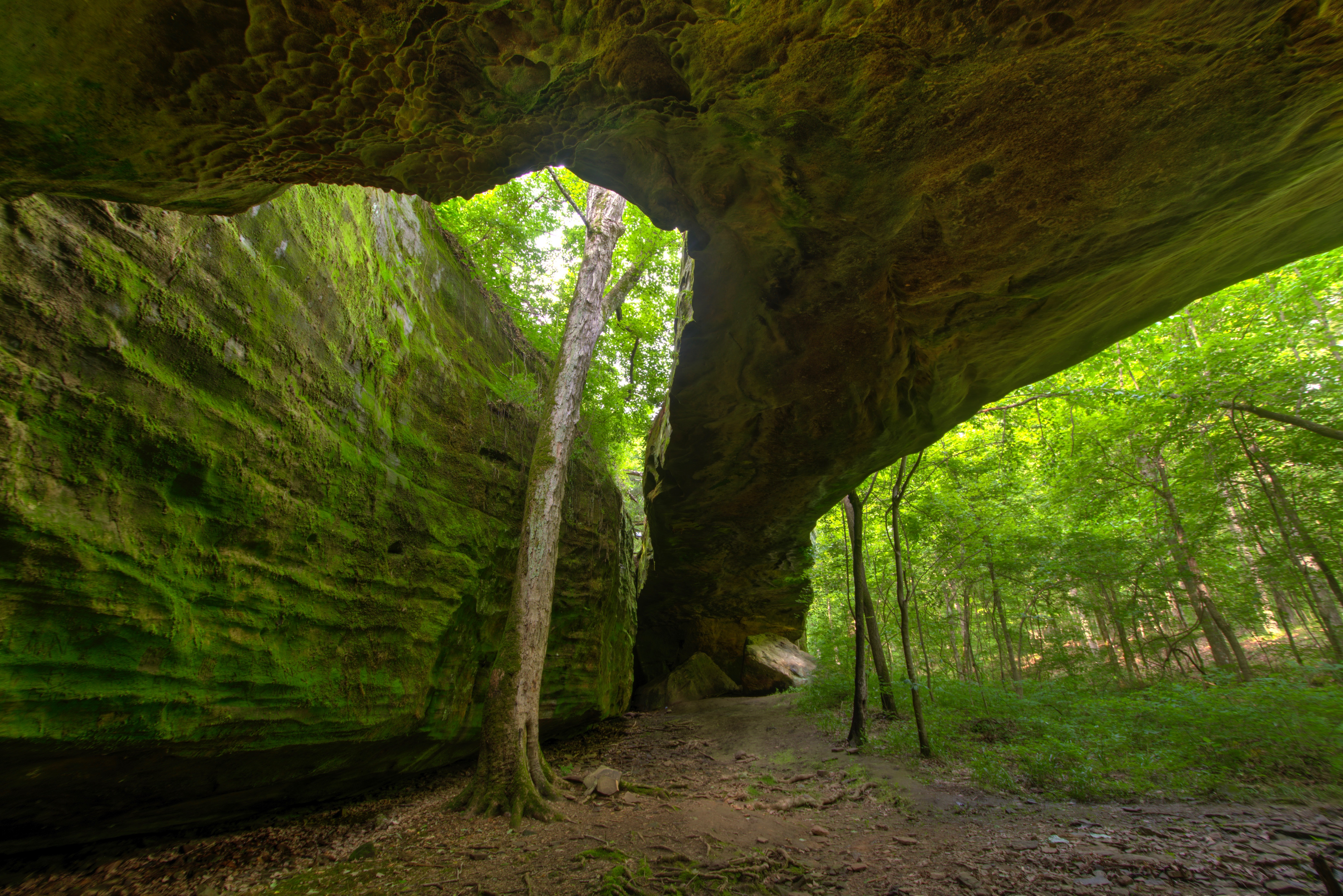
- "Mantle Rock" - the site's eponymous arch

- Location within Kentucky Location within the United States
- Location: Off Kentucky Route 133 near Smithland, Kentucky
- Area: 215 acres (0.87 km^{2})
- MPS: Cherokee Trail of Tears MPS
- NRHP reference No.: 04001253
- Added to NRHP: November 26, 2004

The Mantle Rock Archeological District, near Smithland, Kentucky is a 215 acres (0.87 km^{2}) historic district which was listed on the National Register of Historic Places in 2004.

The site is owned and protected by the Kentucky Nature Conservancy and is accessed by a gravel road off Kentucky Route 133, just west of the small community of Joy, Kentucky. It includes a natural sandstone arch, several springs, and woodland, in a valley in the watershed of McGilligan Creek. It also includes a part of the original Salem-Golconda Road. The site is associated with the Cherokee Trail of Tears.

It includes a contributing site and a contributing structure.
