= Glen Dean, Kentucky =

Unincorporated community in Kentucky, United States

- Unincorporated community
- Location within Kentucky Location within the United States
- Coordinates: 37°39′12″N 86°32′28″W
- Country: United States
- State: Kentucky
- County: Breckinridge
- Elevation: 479 ft (146 m)
- Time zone: UTC-6 (Central (CST))
  - Summer (DST): UTC-5 (CDT)
- Zip code: 40141
- Area code: 270
- GNIS feature ID: 492886

Glen Dean is an unincorporated community in Breckinridge County, Kentucky, United States. Glen Dean is located at the west end of Kentucky Route 108, 9.8 miles (15.8 km) south-southwest of Hardinsburg. Glen Dean had a post office until it closed on June 22, 1991.

The place name Glen Dean comes from the Scottish words glen, meaning a narrow valley, and dean, also meaning valley.

It has also been reported that Glen Dean was named for William Johnson Dean, who was the owner of 2,700 acres. The community sits along Daniels Creek which was reportedly named after a black man named Daniel who drowned there.

The last wild turkey in Breckinridge County was killed in the late 1800s near the site of the first Goshen Baptist Church, located near Glen Dean.

In 1891, a line of the Louisville, Henderson & St. Louis railroad was built through town causing it to grow. The Dean Tie Company came into being the same year and produced wooden railroad ties. By the early 1900s the American Tobacco Company had a warehouse in town. For a while, the town also had a bank, school, hotel, doctor, drugstore, and blacksmith.

A Methodist church was in the community from 1903 to 1956. Goshen Baptist Church was moved into the community in 1904.

The railroad ceased services in 1941 and most of the businesses in the community closed after that. The community's post office closed on June 22, 1991.
