= Kentucky Route 139 =

State highway in Kentucky, United States

Kentucky Route 139
- KY 139 highlighted in red

Route information
- Maintained by KYTC
- Length: 55.797 mi (89.797 km)

Major junctions
- South end: SR 120 at the Kentucky–Tennessee state line
- US 68 / KY 80 near Cadiz; US 68 Bus. in Cadiz; I-24 in rural Caldwell Co; US 62 / KY 91 in Princeton; I-69 in Princeton; KY 70 near Creswell
- North end: KY 120 in rural Crittenden Co

Location
- Country: United States
- State: Kentucky
- Counties: Trigg, Crittenden, Caldwell

Highway system
- Kentucky State Highway System; Interstate; US; State; Parkways
← KY 138	→ KY 140

Kentucky Route 139 (KY 139) is a 55.797-mile-long (89.797 km) state highway in Kentucky that runs from Tennessee State Route 120 at the Tennessee state line south of Cadiz to Kentucky Route 120 in rural Crittenden County north of Princeton via Cadiz and Princeton.

== Route description ==
KY 120 begins at the Tennessee state line just west of the Fort Campbell Military Reservation. The first city it goes through is Cadiz, where it intersects the concurrent U.S. Route 68 (US 68) and KY 80, as well as US 68's business loop in downtown Cadiz. After entering Caldwell County, it then intersects Interstate 24 (I-24) where north of the ramp is the frontage roads, KY 6059 and KY 6060. South from that, at the point where Trigg County meets with Caldwell and Lyon counties.

At Princeton, KY 139 runs concurrently with US 62 and KY 91. KY 91/KY 139 together turns right on the west side of town and then intersects with Interstate 69 (I-69). KY 139 turns off KY 91 and then goes due north to intersect KY 70 in northern Caldwell County. Then KY 139 ends at a junction with KY 120 in rural southeastern Crittenden County just west of the Tradewater River.

== Major intersections ==
County	Location	mi	km	Destinations	Notes
Trigg		0.000	0.000	SR 120 south (Cadiz Road)	Southern terminus; Kentucky-Tennessee state line
Trigg		6.257	10.070	KY 164 (Roaring Spring Road / Linton Road)	
Trigg		9.000	14.484	KY 807 west (Donaldson Creek Road) / Maggie Road	Eastern terminus of KY 807
Trigg		13.125	21.123	KY 525 south (New Hope Road)	Northern terminus of KY 525
Trigg		14.415	23.199	KY 272 (Caledonia Road)	
Trigg		15.285	24.599	US 68 / KY 80	
Trigg	Cadiz	16.706	26.886	US 68 Bus. (Main Street)	
Trigg	Cadiz	16.999	27.357	Marion Street (KY 929 east) / Marion Street	Western terminus of KY 929
Trigg	Cadiz	17.103	27.525	KY 778 north (Brown Street) / Brown Street	Southern terminus of KY 778
Trigg	Cadiz	17.905	28.815	KY 124 north (Cerulean Road)	Southern terminus of KY 124
Trigg		23.789	38.285	KY 276 west (Hurricane Road)	South end of KY 276 overlap
Trigg–Caldwell– Lyon county tripoint		24.620	39.622	KY 93 north / KY 276 east (Blackhawk Road)	North end of KY 276 overlap; southern terminus of KY 93
Caldwell		25.078– 25.098	40.359– 40.391	I-24 – Paducah, Nashville	I-24 exit 56
Caldwell		27.349	44.014	KY 514 east (Nabb School Road)	South end of KY 514 overlap
Caldwell		28.491	45.852	KY 514 west (Nabb School Road)	North end of KY 514 overlap
Caldwell		29.677	47.761	KY 1272 west	Eastern terminus of KY 1272
Caldwell		30.646	49.320	KY 126 south	Northern terminus of KY 126
Caldwell		30.967	49.837	KY 515 west (Eddy Creek Church Road)	Eastern terminus of KY 515
Caldwell	Princeton	35.491	57.117	KY 2080 north (Cadiz Street) / Cadiz Street	Southern terminus of KY 2080
Caldwell	Princeton	35.967	57.883	KY 293 south (South Jefferson Street) / West Legion Street	South end of KY 293 overlap
Caldwell	Princeton	36.290– 36.381	58.403– 58.550	US 62 east / KY 293 north (North Jefferson Street) / KY 91 south (East Main Street)	North end of KY 293 overlap; south end of US 62 / KY 91 overlap
Caldwell	Princeton	37.408	60.202	US 62 west	North end of US 62 overlap
Caldwell	Princeton	37.881	60.964	I-69 – Elizabethtown, Paducah	I-69 exit 79
Caldwell		39.464	63.511	KY 91 north (Marion Road)	North end of KY 91 overlap
Caldwell		43.662	70.267	KY 1119 south (Clayton Road)	Northern terminus of KY 1119
Caldwell		47.141	75.866	KY 70	
Caldwell		48.747	78.451	KY 902 west (Creswell Road) / Creswell Road	Eastern terminus of KY 902
Caldwell		52.765	84.917	KY 1592 east (Webster Road)	Western terminus of KY 1592
Crittenden		55.797	89.797	KY 120	Northern terminus
1.000 mi = 1.609 km; 1.000 km = 0.621 mi: Concurrency terminus
