= Amos, Kentucky =

Unincorporated community in Kentucky, United States

- Unincorporated community
- Location within Kentucky
- Coordinates: 36°39′9″N 86°5′18″W
- Country: United States
- State: Kentucky
- County: Allen
- Elevation: 837 ft (255 m)
- Time zone: UTC-6 (Central (CST))
  - Summer (DST): UTC-5 (CDT)
- GNIS feature ID: 485927

Amos is an unincorporated community in Allen County, Kentucky, United States.

== History ==
On February 6, 2008, a high-end EF3 tornado caused significant damage in Amos. Twelve homes and mobile homes were destroyed in this area, including a few older frame houses that were swept from their foundations. Several of these frames, pieces of farm machinery, and vehicles were thrown and mangled. Large swaths of trees were mowed down in wooded areas, destroying about 200,000 log feet of timber. Fences were flattened, and many farm animals were killed. Eleven people were injured, while four lost their lives.

On June 21, 2019, another EF1 tornado snapped or uprooted numerous trees, inflicted severe roof damage to several barns, and impaled about a dozen 2x4s into the ground. Fallen trees damaged some homes. The tornado was embedded within a very large downburst, which caused severe straight-line wind damage to surrounding areas.

== Geography ==
Amos is on Kentucky Route 99, which travels northeast along Lafayette Road through the settlement.
