= Akersville Road =

Road in Tennessee and Kentucky, USA

- Length: 16.7 mi (26.9 km)
- South end: SR 10 at Lafayette, Tennessee
- Major junctions: KY 87 at Tennessee–Kentucky state line
- North end: KY 100 / KY 87 at Fountain Run, Kentucky

Akersville Road is a locally maintained road located in Macon County in Middle Tennessee and in Allen and Monroe counties in South Central Kentucky. The Tennessee section of the road is maintained by the Macon County Highway Department, while the Kentucky section of the road is maintained by the Kentucky Transportation Cabinet. County road logs identify this road as CR 1054. The total mileage is estimated at 16.7 miles (26.9 km) long.

== Road description ==
The road begins at a junction with a traffic light on Tennessee State Route 10 (SR 10, Scottsville Road), and turns left at the corner of Coolidge Road and Sneed Boulevard. After the left turn, it follows a north-northeasterly path and crosses the Kentucky state line, where it becomes Kentucky Route 87 (KY 87), but retaining the Akersville Road name, into southeastern Allen and western Monroe counties in South Central Kentucky.

In length, the total length of the road's Tennessee run is 8.3 miles (13.4 km) long, while its Kentucky length is 8.686 miles (13.979 km).

== Major intersections ==
| State | County | Location | mi | km | Destinations | Notes |
|---|---|---|---|---|---|---|
| Tennessee | Macon | Lafayette | 0.0 | 0.0 | SR 10 (Scottsville Road) – Lafayette, Scottsville KY | Southern terminus |
| Tennessee | Macon | Lafayette | 0.4 | 0.64 | Coolidge Road / Sneed Blvd. | |
| Tennessee | Macon | | 1.6 | 2.6 | Tuck Road west (to SR 10) | |
| | | | 6.7 0.000 | 10.8 0.000 | Tennessee–Kentucky state line | |
| Kentucky | Allen | No major junctions | | | | |
| Kentucky | Monroe | Fountain Run | 13.443 | 21.634 | KY 100 (Fountain Run Road) / KY 87 north (Main Street) – Scottsville, Barren River Lake State Resort Park, Gamaliel, Tompkinsville | Northern terminus of Akersville Road, KY 87 continues north |
1.000 mi = 1.609 km; 1.000 km = 0.621 mi

== Related routes ==
- Tennessee State Route 261 (Galen Road) connects the Lafayette area to become KY 382 (formerly Section B of KY 87 (Bugtussle Road)) at the state line near Gamaliel, Kentucky
