= Middleton, Kentucky =

Unincorporated community in Kentucky, United States

Middleton
- Unincorporated community
- Location within the state of Kentucky Middleton (the United States)
- Coordinates: 36°45′0″N 86°43′58″W
- Country: United States
- State: Kentucky
- County: Simpson
- Elevation: 640 ft (200 m)
- Time zone: UTC-6 (Central (CST))
  - Summer (DST): UTC-5 (CDT)

Middleton is an unincorporated community in Simpson County, Kentucky, United States. It lies along Routes 100 and 103 west of the city of Franklin, the county seat of Simpson County. Its elevation is 640 feet (195 m), and it is located approximately halfway between Russellville and Franklin, Kentucky. At first glance it appears to be unchanged in centuries, with the few homes spotting the countryside clearly dating from the 18th and 19th centuries.
