= Flemingsburg Junction, Kentucky =

Unincorporated community in Kentucky, United States

- Unincorporated community
- Location within Kentucky
- Coordinates: 38°21′37″N 83°50′21″W
- Country: United States
- State: Kentucky
- County: Fleming
- Elevation: 899 ft (274 m)
- Time zone: UTC-5 (Eastern (EST))
  - Summer (DST): UTC-4 (EDT)
- Area code: 606
- GNIS feature ID: 494256

Flemingsburg Junction is an unincorporated community in Fleming County, Kentucky, United States. Flemingsburg Junction is located at the junction of Kentucky Route 161 and Kentucky Route 170, 4.7 miles (7.6 km) west-northwest of Flemingsburg. The Ben Johnson House, which is listed on the National Register of Historic Places, is located in Flemingsburg Junction.
