= Kentucky Route 293 =

State highway in Kentucky, United States

Kentucky Route 293
- KY 293 highlighted in red

Route information
- Maintained by KYTC
- Length: 38.267 mi (61.585 km)

Major junctions
- South end: KY 93 / KY 1055 near Eddyville
- I-24 near Eddyville US 62 / KY 91 / KY 139 in Princeton; I-69 at Princeton; KY 70 in rural northeast Caldwell Co. KY 109 / KY 120 in Providence
- North end: KY 270 in rural south central Webster County

Location
- Country: United States
- State: Kentucky
- Counties: Lyon, Caldwell, Hopkins, Webster

Highway system
- Kentucky State Highway System; Interstate; US; State; Parkways
← KY 292	→ KY 294

Kentucky Route 293 (KY 293) is a 38.267-mile-long (61.585 km) state highway in Kentucky that runs from Kentucky Routes 93 and 1055 southeast of Eddyville to Kentucky Route 270 northeast of Providence via Princeton and Providence.

== Route description ==
KY 293 starts in south Eddyville at a junction with KY 93 and KY 1055. Shortly after its beginning KY 93 intersects Interstate 24 (I-24) at that freeway's exit 45 interchange. It enters Caldwell County after leaving Saratoga and intersects KY 139 and KY 91 in downtown Princeton. It then runs concurrently with U.S. Route 62 (US 62) in downtown and breaks off US 62 to traverse the exit 81 interchange with I-69.

KY 293 continues on to intersect KY 70 in northeastern Caldwell County just north of Needmore. KY 293 briefly enters the northwestern sliver of Hopkins County before entering Webster County and reaching the city of Providence.

In Providence, KY 293 runs concurrently with KY 109 for 0.046 miles (0.074 km) and then KY 120 for about 0.424 miles (0.682 km). KY 293 then overlaps a third state route, KY 670 for 1.163 miles (1.872 km). KY 293 reaches its northern terminus at the intersection with KY 270 near Lisman.

== Major intersections ==
County	Location	mi	km	Destinations	Notes
Lyon		0.000	0.000	KY 93 / KY 1055 west	Southern terminus; eastern terminus of KY 1055
Lyon		0.310– 0.334	0.499– 0.538	I-24 – Paducah, Nashville	I-24 exit 45
Lyon		0.568	0.914	KY 818 north	South end of KY 818 overlap
Lyon		0.707	1.138	KY 818 south (Old Saratoga-Gray Farm Road)	North end of KY 818 overlap
Lyon		2.472	3.978	KY 730 south	Northern terminus of KY 730
Caldwell		7.026	11.307	KY 903 south	Northern terminus of KY 903
Caldwell	Princeton	9.094	14.635	KY 1495 west (Grooms Lane)	Eastern terminus of KY 1495
Caldwell	Princeton	9.971	16.047	KY 139 south (East Legion Drive) / West Legion Street	South end of KY 139 overlap
Caldwell	Princeton	10.294– 10.367	16.567– 16.684	US 62 west / KY 139 north (West Market Street) / KY 91 (East Main Street)	North end of KY 139 overlap; south end of US 62 overlap
Caldwell	Princeton	10.675	17.180	US 62 east (McGoodwin Avenue)	North end of US 62 overlap
Caldwell	Princeton	10.881	17.511	East Young Street (KY 3114 east)	Western terminus of KY 3114
Caldwell		12.063– 12.088	19.414– 19.454	I-69 – Elizabethtown, Paducah	I-69 exit 13
Caldwell		14.502	23.339	KY 1119 north (Briarfield Road)	Southern terminus of KY 1119
Caldwell		22.044	35.476	KY 70 west	South end of KY 70 overlap
Caldwell		23.028	37.060	KY 70 east	North end of KY 70 overlap
Caldwell		24.537	39.488	KY 1592 west (Webster Road)	Eastern terminus of KY 1592
Hopkins		26.834	43.185	KY 1294 east (Government Bend Road)	Western terminus of KY 1294
Webster	Providence	32.393	52.131	KY 109 south (South Broadway Street)	South end of KY 109 overlap
Webster	Providence	32.439	52.206	KY 109 north (North Broadway Street) / KY 120 west (West Main Street)	North end of KY 109 overlap; south end of KY 120 overlap
Webster	Providence	32.863	52.888	KY 120 east (Westerfield Drive)	North end of KY 120 overlap
Webster		33.286	53.569	KY 670 west	South end of KY 670 overlap
Webster	Providence	34.449	55.440	KY 670 east	North end of KY 670 overlap
Webster		38.267	61.585	KY 270	Northern terminus
1.000 mi = 1.609 km; 1.000 km = 0.621 mi: Concurrency terminus

Lyon County + KY 139 Overlap + US 62 Overlap + KY 70 Overlap + Caldwell County + Hopkins County + KY 109 Overlap + KY 120 Overlap + KY 670 Overlap = 30.524 KY 109 Overlap = 0.470
