= Kentucky Route 91 =

State highway in Kentucky, United States

Kentucky Route 91
- KY 91 highlighted in red

Route information
- Maintained by KYTC
- Length: 49.783 mi (80.118 km)

Major junctions
- South end: US 68 / KY 80 in Hopkinsville
- KY 1682 (Hopkinsville Bypass); US 62 / KY 139 / KY 293 in Princeton; I-69 near Princeton; US 641 / KY 70 in Fredonia; US 60 in Marion
- North end: IL 1 / Cave-in-Rock Ferry at Ohio River ferry near Cave-in-Rock, IL

Location
- Country: United States
- State: Kentucky
- Counties: Christian, Caldwell, Crittenden

Highway system
- Kentucky State Highway System; Interstate; US; State; Parkways
← KY 90	→ KY 92

Kentucky Route 91 (KY 91) is a 49.783-mile-long (80.118 km) state highway that traverses three counties in western Kentucky. It begins in Hopkinsville, Kentucky and ends at the Ohio River, the Kentucky–Illinois state line in northern Crittenden County.

== Route description ==
=== Hopkinsville to Princeton ===
It begins at a junction with U.S. Route 68 and Kentucky Route 80 in Hopkinsville, Kentucky, the Christian County seat. It crosses KY-1682, the Hopkinsville By-Pass before leaving town. It goes on a northwesterly path, and its junction with Kentucky Route 398 is KY 91's access point to Pennyrile Forest State Resort Park.

KY 91 enters Caldwell County, and then it would meet Kentucky Routes 139 and 293, along with US 62 in downtown Princeton. It then traverses Interstate 69 on the northwest outskirts of Princeton.

=== Princeton to Cave-in-Rock ===
KY 91 meets Kentucky Route 70 and then U.S. Route 641 at Fredonia, a community northwest of Princeton. KY 70, KY 91, and US 641 then run concurrently from there into Crittenden County. KY 70 departs from US 641/KY 91 at a point north of the Crittenden-Caldwell County line, while KY 91 remains with US 641 until the U.S. Route's northern terminus at the U.S. Route 60 junction at Kentucky. For a few blocks, KY 91 runs concurrently with US 60, and then KY 91 goes further north to reach its northern terminus at the Cave-In-Rock Ferry on the Ohio River, which also marks the Kentucky–Illinois state line. It becomes Illinois State Highway 1 upon entry into Hardin County, Illinois.

== Major intersections ==
County	Location	mi	km	Destinations	Notes
Christian	Hopkinsville	0.000	0.000	US 68 (Cadiz Road) / KY 80 (West 7th Street)	Southern terminus of KY 91
Christian	Hopkinsville	0.679	1.093	KY 1682 (Eagle Way) to I-169	
Christian	Sinking Fork	5.43	8.74	KY 1349 south (Quisenberry Lane)	Northern terminus of KY-1349
Christian	Sinking Fork	6.351	10.221	KY 1026 west (Gracey-Sinking Fork Road)	Southern end of KY 1026 concurrency
Christian	Sinking Fork	6.718	10.812	KY 1026 east (Clark Store-Sinking Fork Road)	Northern end of KY 1026 concurrency
Christian	Bainbridge	11.709	18.844	KY 398 north (Bainbridge Road) – Pennyrile Forest State Resort Park	Southern terminus of KY 398
Christian	Bainbridge	12.231	19.684	KY 124 west (Sugar Creek Road)	Eastern terminius of KY 124
Caldwell		17.562	28.263	KY 672	
Caldwell		22.09	35.55	KY 1857 south (Dripping Spring Road)	Northern terminus of KY 1857
Caldwell		22.948	36.931	KY 1603 north (Scottsburg Road)	Southern terminus of KY 1603
Caldwell		24.043	38.693	KY 128 south (State Route 128)	Northern terminus of KY 128
Caldwell	Princeton	26.736	43.027	KY 2080 south (Cadiz Street)	Northern terminus of KY 2080; old KY 139
Caldwell	Princeton	26.839	43.193	East Main St./East Washington St.	Begin splitting of KY 91’s south/north lanes
Caldwell	Princeton	26.981	43.422	US 62 West (Do Not Enter)	Eastern end of concurrency with US 62 eastbound/KY 139 northbound
Caldwell	Princeton	26.999	43.451	US 62 east / KY 293 north	Northern end of US 62 east/KY-293 north concurrency; eastern end of concurrency with US 62 westbound/KY 293 southbound
Caldwell	Princeton	27.017	43.480	KY 139 south / KY 293 south	Southern end of KY 139 concurrency; western end of KY 293 southbound concurrency
Caldwell	Princeton	27.305	43.943	US 62 east / KY 91 south / KY 139 south	End splitting of KY 91’s south/north lanes
Caldwell	Princeton	28.05	45.14	US 62 west – Eddyville	Western end of US 62 concurrency
Caldwell	Princeton	28.493– 28.553	45.855– 45.952	I-69 – Paducah, Elizabethtown	I-69 Exit 79; Former Western Kentucky Parkway exit 11
Caldwell		30.106	48.451	KY 139 north (Farmersville Road)	Northern end of KY 139 concurrency
Caldwell	Fredonia	39.59	63.71	KY 70 east – Madisonville	Southern end of KY 70 concurrency
see KY 70, US 641, and US 60
Crittenden	Marion	49.625	79.864	US 60 east – Morganfield	Northern end of US 60 concurrency
Crittenden	Marion	50.072	80.583	KY 981 south (Old Salem Road)	Northern terminus of KY 981
Crittenden		58.018	93.371	KY 387 north	Southern terminus of KY 387
Crittenden		59.548	95.833	KY 135 south – Carrsville	Northern terminus of KY 135
Ohio River		60.887	97.988	Cave-In-Rock Ferry; Kentucky–Illinois state line	
Ohio River		60.887	97.988	IL 1	Continuation into Illinois
1.000 mi = 1.609 km; 1.000 km = 0.621 mi: Concurrency terminus
