= Ledbetter, Kentucky =

Census-designated place in Kentucky, United States

- Census-designated place
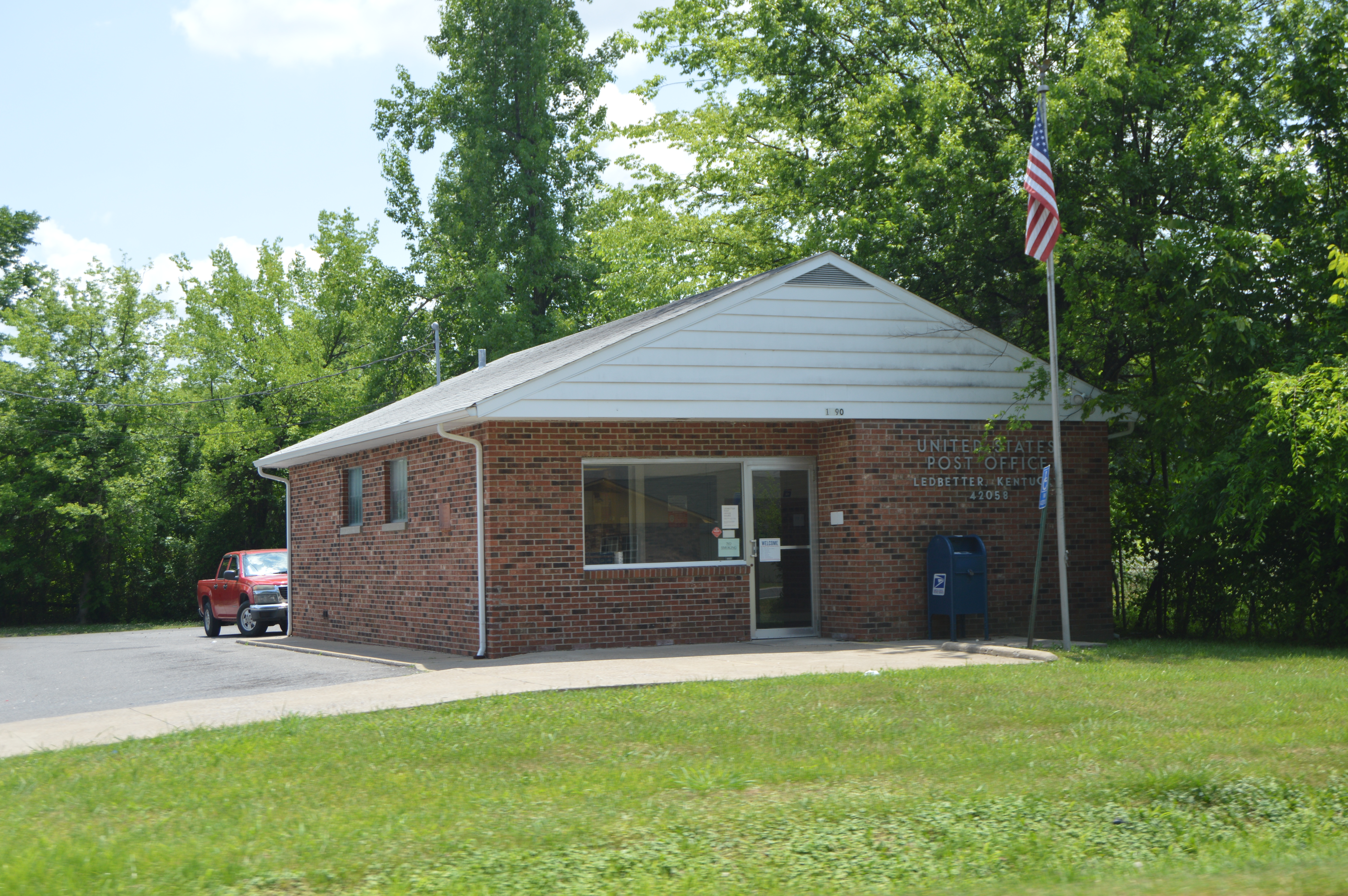
- Post office on U.S. Route 60

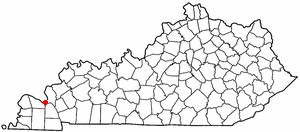
- Location of Ledbetter, Kentucky
- Coordinates: 37°02′55″N 88°29′42″W
- Country: United States
- State: Kentucky
- County: Livingston

Area
  - Total: 6.97 sq mi (18.05 km^{2})
  - Land: 6.88 sq mi (17.81 km^{2})
  - Water: 0.093 sq mi (0.24 km^{2})
- Elevation: 348 ft (106 m)

Population (2020)
  - Total: 1,836
  - Density: 267.0/sq mi (103.08/km^{2})
- Time zone: UTC-6 (Central (CST))
  - Summer (DST): UTC-5 (CDT)
- ZIP code: 42058
- Area codes: 270 & 364
- FIPS code: 21-44434
- GNIS feature ID: 2403225

Ledbetter is a census-designated place (CDP) in Livingston County, Kentucky, United States. As of the 2020 census, Ledbetter had a population of 1,836. This made it the largest and most populous community in Livingston County. It is part of the Paducah, KY-IL Metropolitan Statistical Area, lying directly across the Tennessee River from Paducah. The village of Salem is less than two times the population of Ledbetter.

== Geography ==
Ledbetter is located in the southwestern portion of Livingston County along U.S. Route 60 just northeast of Paducah. The Census-designated place is located along the banks of the Ohio River, with the mouth of the Tennessee River, which marks Livingston County's southern boundary with McCracken County, located just west of the area.

According to the United States Census Bureau, the Census-designated place has a total area of 5.3 square miles (14 km^{2}), of which 5.3 square miles (14 km^{2}) is land and 0.04 square miles (0.10 km^{2}) (0.75%) is water.

== Demographics ==
Historical population
| Census | Pop. | Note | %± |
|---|---|---|---|
| 2020 | 1,836 | | — |
U.S. Decennial Census

=== 2020 census ===
As of the 2020 census, Ledbetter had a population of 1,836. The median age was 42.4 years. 24.0% of residents were under the age of 18 and 20.3% of residents were 65 years of age or older. For every 100 females there were 99.3 males, and for every 100 females age 18 and over there were 94.8 males age 18 and over.

22.5% of residents lived in urban areas, while 77.5% lived in rural areas.

There were 762 households in Ledbetter, of which 30.6% had children under the age of 18 living in them. Of all households, 51.6% were married-couple households, 16.9% were households with a male householder and no spouse or partner present, and 24.8% were households with a female householder and no spouse or partner present. About 27.0% of all households were made up of individuals and 14.6% had someone living alone who was 65 years of age or older.

There were 840 housing units, of which 9.3% were vacant. The homeowner vacancy rate was 2.3% and the rental vacancy rate was 17.6%.

Racial composition as of the 2020 census
| Race | Number | Percent |
|---|---|---|
| White | 1,699 | 92.5% |
| Black or African American | 6 | 0.3% |
| American Indian and Alaska Native | 8 | 0.4% |
| Asian | 4 | 0.2% |
| Native Hawaiian and Other Pacific Islander | 0 | 0.0% |
| Some other race | 18 | 1.0% |
| Two or more races | 101 | 5.5% |
| Hispanic or Latino (of any race) | 41 | 2.2% |

=== 2000 census ===
As of the census of 2000, there were 1,700 people, 681 households, and 493 families residing in the CDP. The population density was 322.4 inhabitants per square mile (124.5/km^{2}). There were 712 housing units at an average density of 135.0 per square mile (52.1/km^{2}). The racial makeup of the CDP was 99.06% White, 0.29% African American, 0.24% Native American or Alaska Native, 0.12% Asian, and 0.29% from two or more races. Hispanics or Latinos of any race were 0.53% of the population.

There were 681 households, out of which 32.3% had children under the age of 18 living with them, 57.4% were married couples living together, 10.6% had a female householder with no husband present, and 27.5% were non-families. 22.6% of all households were made up of individuals, and 6.8% had someone living alone who was 65 years of age or older. The average household size was 2.50 and the average family size was 2.90.

The age distribution was 23.8% under the age of 18, 9.1% from 18 to 24, 30.0% from 25 to 44, 27.5% from 45 to 64, and 9.5% who were 65 years of age or older. The median age was 37 years. For every 100 females, there were 100.9 males. For every 100 females age 18 and over, there were 98.0 males.

The median income for a household in the CDP was $34,830, and the median income for a family was $40,217. Males had a median income of $33,080 versus $18,224 for females. The per capita income for the CDP was $16,196. About 7.7% of families and 7.7% of the population were below the poverty threshold, including 8.2% of those under age 18 and 7.4% of those age 65 or over.
