= Lola, Kentucky =

Unincorporated community in Kentucky, United States

- Unincorporated community
- Location in Kentucky Location in the United States
- Coordinates: 37°19′7″N 88°18′28″W
- Country: United States
- State: Kentucky
- County: Livingston
- Elevation: 397 ft (121 m)
- Time zone: UTC-6 (Central (CST))
  - Summer (DST): UTC-5 (CST)
- ZIP codes: 42059
- GNIS feature ID: 508494

Lola is an unincorporated community in Livingston County, Kentucky, United States. The community is at the intersection of Kentucky routes 138 and 838 approximately 1.2 miles (1.9 km) southwest of the Livingston-Crittenden county line.

In 1881, Robert P. Mitchell established a post office and named it for his daughter, Lola.
