= Louellen, Kentucky =

Unincorporated community in Kentucky, United States

- Unincorporated community
- Location within Kentucky Location within the United States
- Coordinates: 36°54′46″N 83°5′39″W
- Country: United States
- State: Kentucky
- County: Harlan
- Elevation: 1,483 ft (452 m)
- Time zone: UTC-5 (Eastern (EST))
  - Summer (DST): UTC-4 (DST)
- GNIS feature ID: 513649

Louellen is an unincorporated community and coal town in Harlan County, Kentucky, United States. Their post office is closed.
