= State Line, Kentucky =

Unincorporated community in Kentucky, United States

- Unincorporated community
- Location within the state of Kentucky State; Line (the United States)
- Coordinates: 36°30′39″N 89°7′13″W
- Country: United States
- State: Kentucky
- County: Fulton
- Elevation: 374 ft (114 m)
- Time zone: UTC-6 (Central (CST))
  - Summer (DST): UTC-5 (CST)
- GNIS feature ID: 504277

State Line is an unincorporated community in Fulton County, Kentucky, United States.

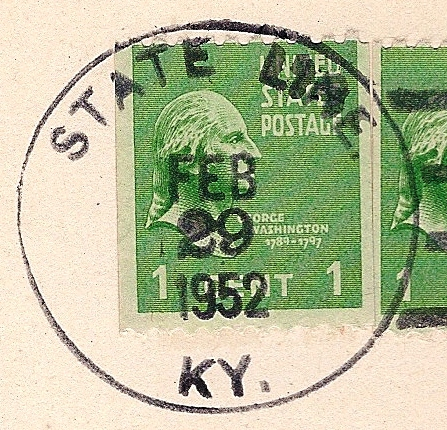
