= Jabez, Kentucky =

Unincorporated community in Kentucky, United States

Jabez
- Unincorporated community
- Location within the state of Kentucky Jabez (the United States)
- Coordinates: 36°59′13″N 84°53′37″W
- Country: United States
- State: Kentucky
- County: Russell
- Elevation: 1,050 ft (320 m)
- Time zone: UTC-6 (Central (CST))
  - Summer (DST): UTC-5 (EDT)
- ZIP codes: 42544
- GNIS feature ID: 508325

Jabez is an unincorporated community located in Russell County, Kentucky, United States.

A post office was established in the community during 1881, the building still remains. The town was named after the biblical city of Jabesh-Gilead.
