= Forkland, Kentucky =

Unincorporated community in Kentucky, United States

Coordinates: 37.552573°N 84.979957°W

Forkland is a small unincorporated community in southwestern Boyle County, Kentucky, United States, along the North Rolling Fork. It is part of the Danville Micropolitan Statistical Area.

The area was settled by 1800 and the name was in use at an early date. A Forkland post office, possibly located a little to the east at the mouth of Hungry Neck Fork, operated from 1891 to 1905.
