= Transkentucky Transportation Railroad =

Railway line in Kentucky

Overview
- Headquarters: Paris, Kentucky
- Reporting mark: TTIS
- Locale: Paris, Kentucky
- Dates of operation: 1979–present
- Predecessor: Louisville and Nashville Railroad

Technical
- Track gauge: 4 ft 8 1/2 in (1,435 mm) standard gauge
- Length: 50 miles

Other
- Website: ttirailroad.com

The Transkentucky Transportation Railroad, Inc. (reporting mark TTIS) is a 50-mile rail transport line purchased from Louisville and Nashville Railroad in 1979 with the goal of transporting coal produced in Eastern Kentucky to the Ohio River. It is a Class III railroad that operates freight service between Paris and Maysville.

In 1991 CSX Transportation acquired Transkentucky Railroad Transportation, Inc. and Transcontinental Terminals, Inc.

The railroad is now owned by MB Railroad (Midwest & Bluegrass Rail), mainly providing transload services. It appears there is no longer a coal business, with much of their line out of service.

== Current and former equipment ==
The historical list of TTIS locomotives is presented below.

Current locomotive roster
| Road Number | Make | Model | Built |
|---|---|---|---|
| TTI 9 | Baldwin | VO-1000 | 9/1945 Scrapped 2010 |
| TTI 3086 & 9086 | Alco | S4 | |
| TTI 242 - 261 | GE | U28B | 1966 |
| TTI 1072, 75 & 76 | Alco/EMD | GP12 (ex-RS3) | 1-2/55 |
| TTI 2075-2077 | RSCI | Slug | 1973 |
| TTI 5727, 5729, 5735, 5758, 5763, 5788, 5791, 5793 and 5797 | GE | U36B | 8/1970 - 2/1972 |
| TTI 5807, 5815, 5819, 5827, 5857, 5888, 5895, 5902, 5908, 5911 and 5922 | GE | B36-7 | - |
