= Joy, Kentucky =

Unincorporated community in Kentucky, United States

- Unincorporated community
- Location in Kentucky Location in the United States
- Coordinates: 37°21′18″N 88°23′09″W
- Country: United States
- State: Kentucky
- County: Livingston
- Elevation: 423 ft (129 m)
- Time zone: UTC-6 (Central (CST))
  - Summer (DST): UTC-5 (CST)
- GNIS feature ID: 513083

Joy is an unincorporated community in Livingston County, Kentucky, United States.

== History ==
The area is known for its post office, named Joy, that was established in 1896 and remained in operation until 1957. The name "Joy" was most likely selected for its brevity.

It was known as the Lawless Blacksmith Shop.

The Mantle Rock Archeological District, which is associated with the Cherokee Trail of Tears, is nearby and is listed on the National Register of Historic Places.
