= Cave-In-Rock Ferry =

Passenger ferry service in Kentucky, US

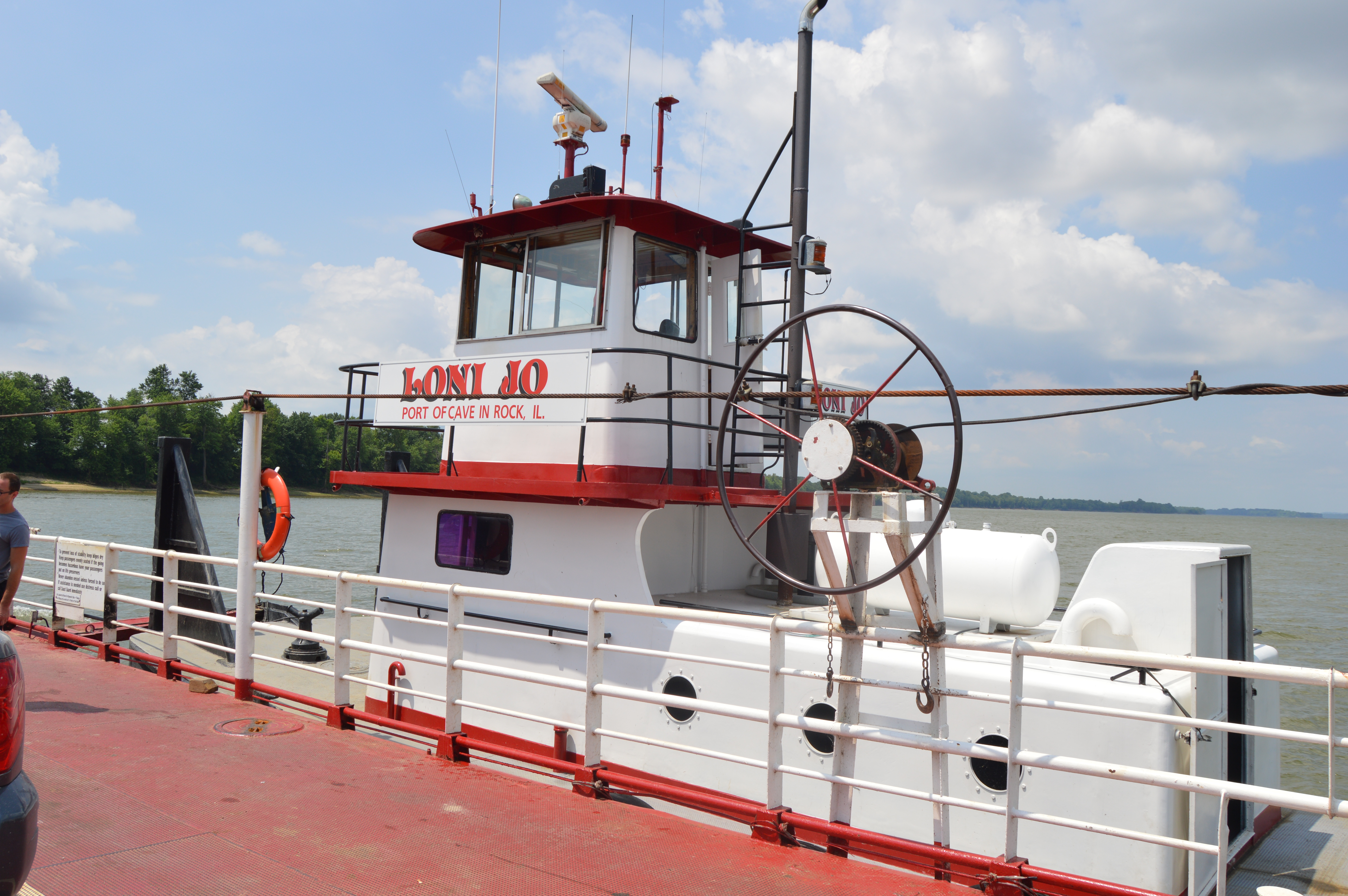
- Locale: IL 1 in Cave-In-Rock, Hardin County, Illinois, and KY 91 in Crittenden County, Kentucky
- Waterway: Ohio River
- Transit type: Passenger/automobile ferry
- Operator: Kentucky Transportation Cabinet Illinois Department of Transportation Lonnie Lewis (ferry boat owner)
- Began operation: 1803
- No. of lines: 1
- No. of vessels: 1
- No. of terminals: 2

The Cave-In-Rock Ferry is one of four passenger ferry services that cross the Ohio River into the U.S. state of Kentucky. It connects Illinois Route 1 in Cave-In-Rock, Hardin County, Illinois, to Kentucky Route 91, 10.6 miles north of Marion, Kentucky. It is the only public river crossing available between the Brookport Bridge at Paducah, Kentucky, and the Shawneetown Bridge at Old Shawneetown, Illinois.

As of July 1, 2026 ferry service has been discontinued due to contract disputes between the states of Kentucky, Illinois and the ferry owner.

== History ==
In October 1829, the county court of Livingston County, Kentucky granted James Ford a franchise to operate a ferry.

Since 1994, Lonnie Lewis of Lonnie Lewis Inc., doing business as Cave in Rock Ferry Company, has operated the ferry. Operation is jointly funded by the Kentucky Transportation Cabinet (KYTC) and the Illinois Department of Transportation (IDOT).

The Loni Jo is the current vessel that traverses the river. As of July 2022, 500 vehicles cross daily. The ferry operates 16 hours from 6 a.m. to 10 p.m. daily.

Commuters use the ferry to avoid the approximately 35-mile detour to the nearest bridge in Shawneetown. The ferry is a tourist attraction that connects the Shawnee National Forest and Cave-In-Rock in Illinois and Amish country in Crittenden County, Kentucky. Farmers use the service to transport tractors and agricultural equipment.

== See also ==
- Ford's Ferry, from Kentucky to Illinois
- Lusk's Ferry, from Illinois to Kentucky
- Lusk's Ferry Road
- List of crossings of the Ohio River
