= Livingston County, Kentucky =

County in Kentucky, United States

- County
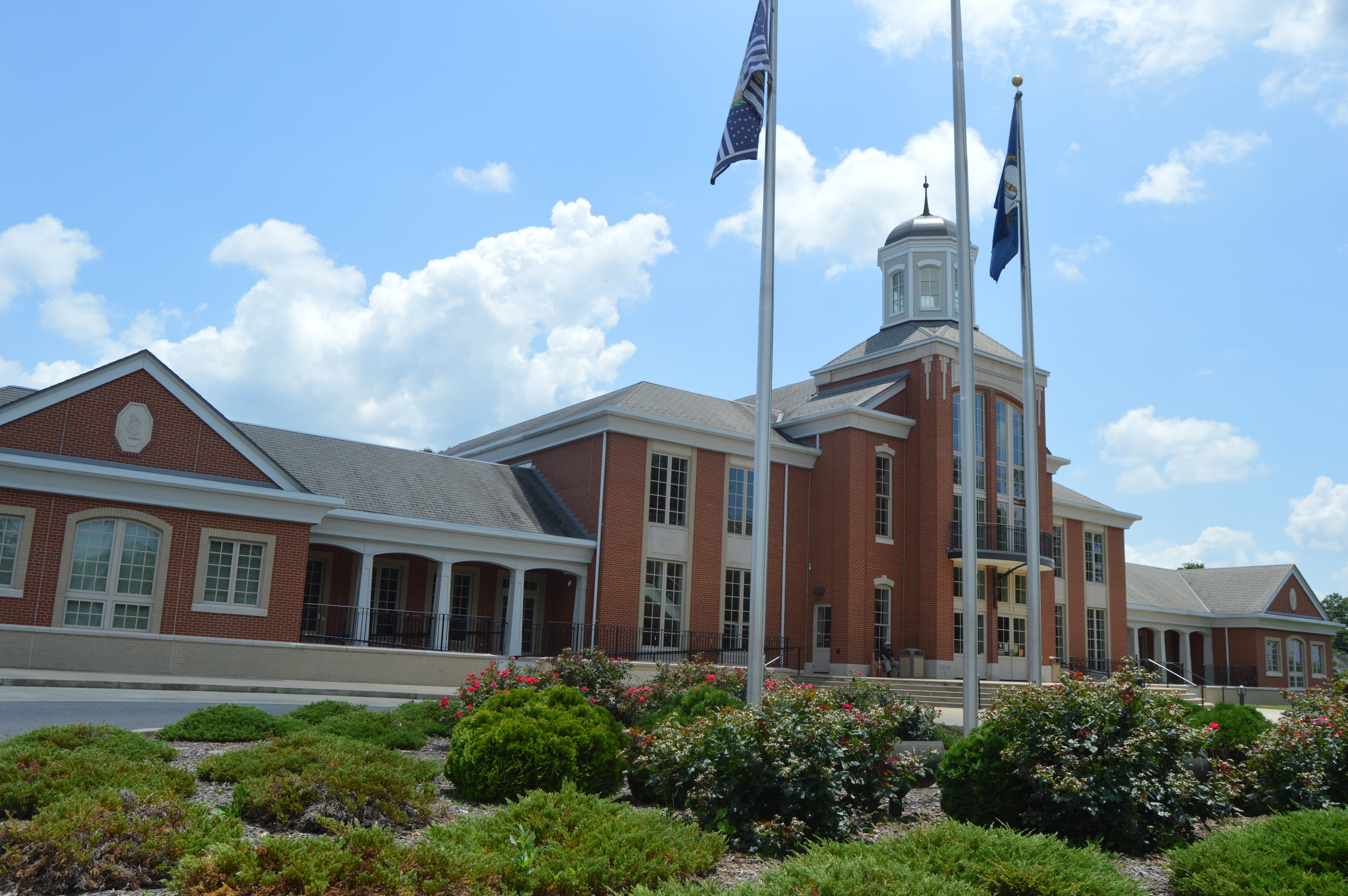
- Livingston County Judicial Center in Smithland

- Location within the U.S. state of Kentucky
- Coordinates: 37°13′N 88°21′W
- Country: United States
- State: Kentucky
- Founded: 1798
- Named for: Robert R. Livingston
- Seat: Smithland
- Largest community: Ledbetter

Government
  - Judge/Executive: Michael Williams (R)

Area
  - Total: 342 sq mi (890 km^{2})
  - Land: 313 sq mi (810 km^{2})
  - Water: 29 sq mi (75 km^{2}) 8.5%

Population (2020)
  - Total: 8,888
  - Estimate (2025): 8,863 ▼
  - Density: 28.4/sq mi (11.0/km^{2})
- Time zone: UTC−6 (Central)
  - Summer (DST): UTC−5 (CDT)
- Congressional district: 1st
- Website: livingstoncountyky.com

Livingston County is a county located in the U.S. state of Kentucky. As of the 2020 census, the population was 8,888. Its county seat is Smithland and its largest community is Ledbetter. The county was established in 1798 from land taken from Christian County and is named for Robert R. Livingston, a member of the Committee of Five that drafted the U.S. Declaration of Independence. The county was strongly pro-Confederate during the American Civil War and many men volunteered for the Confederate Army. Livingston County is part of the Paducah, KY-IL Metropolitan Statistical Area. It is a prohibition or dry county with the exception of Grand Rivers which voted to allow alcohol sales in 2016.

== Geography ==
According to the U.S. Census Bureau, the county has a total area of 342 square miles (890 km^{2}), of which 313 square miles (810 km^{2}) is land and 29 square miles (75 km^{2}) (8.5%) is water. The western border with Illinois is formed by the Ohio River.

=== Adjacent counties ===
- Hardin County, Illinois (north)
- Crittenden County (northeast)
- Lyon County (southeast)
- Marshall County (south)
- McCracken County (southwest)
- Massac County, Illinois (west)
- Pope County, Illinois (northwest)

=== Major highways ===
- U.S. Route 60
- U.S. Route 62
- Interstate 24
- Interstate 69
- Kentucky Route 453

== Demographics ==
Historical population
Census	Pop.	Note	%±
1800	2,856		—
1810	3,674		28.6%
1820	5,824		58.5%
1830	5,971		2.5%
1840	9,025		51.1%
1850	6,578		−27.1%
1860	7,213		9.7%
1870	8,200		13.7%
1880	9,165		11.8%
1890	9,474		3.4%
1900	11,354		19.8%
1910	10,627		−6.4%
1920	9,732		−8.4%
1930	8,608		−11.5%
1940	9,127		6.0%
1950	7,184		−21.3%
1960	7,029		−2.2%
1970	7,596		8.1%
1980	9,219		21.4%
1990	9,062		−1.7%
2000	9,804		8.2%
2010	9,519		−2.9%
2020	8,888		−6.6%
2025 (est.)	8,863	▼	−0.3%
U.S. Decennial Census; 1790-1960 1900-1990; 1990-2000 2010-2021

=== 2020 census ===
As of the 2020 census, the county had a population of 8,888. The median age was 47.7 years. 19.8% of residents were under the age of 18 and 23.2% of residents were 65 years of age or older. For every 100 females there were 97.0 males, and for every 100 females age 18 and over there were 95.2 males age 18 and over.

The racial makeup of the county was 93.2% White, 0.3% Black or African American, 0.3% American Indian and Alaska Native, 0.2% Asian, 0.1% Native Hawaiian and Pacific Islander, 0.9% from some other race, and 5.1% from two or more races. Hispanic or Latino residents of any race comprised 2.1% of the population.

4.7% of residents lived in urban areas, while 95.3% lived in rural areas.

There were 3,789 households in the county, of which 26.2% had children under the age of 18 living with them and 23.5% had a female householder with no spouse or partner present. About 28.7% of all households were made up of individuals and 14.3% had someone living alone who was 65 years of age or older.

There were 4,589 housing units, of which 17.4% were vacant. Among occupied housing units, 81.2% were owner-occupied and 18.8% were renter-occupied. The homeowner vacancy rate was 2.3% and the rental vacancy rate was 10.2%.

=== 2010 census ===
As of the census of 2010, there were 9,519 people living in the county. The population density was 31 per square mile (12/km^{2}). There were 4,772 housing units at an average density of 15 per square mile (5.8/km^{2}). The racial makeup of the county was 98.49% White, 0.14% Black or African American, 0.42% Native American, 0.03% Asian, 0.01% Pacific Islander, 0.28% from other races, and 0.63% from two or more races. 0.75% of the population were Hispanics or Latinos of any race.

There were 3,996 households, out of which 29.50% had children under the age of 18 living with them, 60.40% were married couples living together, 7.90% had a female householder with no husband present, and 27.60% were non-families. 24.40% of all households were made up of individuals, and 11.00% had someone living alone who was 65 years of age or older. The average household size was 2.42 and the average family size was 2.86.

The age distribution was 22.30% under the age of 18, 7.50% from 18 to 24, 28.20% from 25 to 44, 27.00% from 45 to 64, and 14.90% who were 65 years of age or older. The median age was 40 years. For every 100 females, there were 97.80 males. For every 100 females age 18 and over, there were 97.70 males.

The median income for a household in the county was $31,776, and the median income for a family was $39,486. Males had a median income of $33,633 versus $19,617 for females. The per capita income for the county was $17,072. About 7.60% of families and 10.30% of the population were below the poverty line, including 10.70% of those under age 18 and 15.80% of those age 65 or over.

== Communities ==
=== Cities ===
- Carrsville
- Grand Rivers
- Salem
- Smithland (county seat)

=== Census-designated places ===
- Burna
- Ledbetter (largest community)

=== Other unincorporated communities ===
==== North Livingston ====
- Bayou
- Birdsville
- Hampton
- Joy
- Lola
- Pinckneyville

==== South Livingston ====
- Iuka
- Lake City
- Tiline

=== Ghost Town ===
- Berry Ferry

== Notable people ==
- Andrew Jackson Smith (September 3, 1843 – March 4, 1932) was a runaway slave, Union Army soldier during the American Civil War. He was awarded the Medal of Honor for his actions at the Battle of Honey Hill.
- James Ford (1775–1833), was a civic leader and businessman who was later discovered to be the secret criminal leader of a gang of Ohio River pirates and highwaymen in the early 19th century.

== Politics ==
United States presidential election results for Livingston County, Kentucky
Year	Republican		Democratic		Third party(ies)	
Year	No.	%	No.	%	No.	%
1912	732	35.11%	1,009	48.39%	344	16.50%
1916	923	40.04%	1,287	55.84%	95	4.12%
1920	1,790	47.30%	1,933	51.08%	61	1.61%
1924	1,267	40.84%	1,768	57.00%	67	2.16%
1928	1,767	59.12%	1,217	40.72%	5	0.17%
1932	1,070	32.31%	2,231	67.36%	11	0.33%
1936	1,039	35.26%	1,897	64.37%	11	0.37%
1940	1,184	36.85%	2,013	62.65%	16	0.50%
1944	1,202	41.56%	1,686	58.30%	4	0.14%
1948	671	28.81%	1,622	69.64%	36	1.55%
1952	1,102	41.48%	1,554	58.49%	1	0.04%
1956	1,247	40.94%	1,795	58.93%	4	0.13%
1960	1,639	51.92%	1,518	48.08%	0	0.00%
1964	821	27.56%	2,147	72.07%	11	0.37%
1968	1,079	32.63%	1,272	38.46%	956	28.91%
1972	1,673	59.96%	1,065	38.17%	52	1.86%
1976	878	25.71%	2,497	73.12%	40	1.17%
1980	1,670	41.67%	2,287	57.06%	51	1.27%
1984	1,866	47.96%	2,007	51.58%	18	0.46%
1988	1,834	46.92%	2,052	52.49%	23	0.59%
1992	1,339	31.05%	2,386	55.33%	587	13.61%
1996	1,258	31.70%	2,228	56.15%	482	12.15%
2000	2,118	50.07%	2,022	47.80%	90	2.13%
2004	2,675	56.84%	2,007	42.65%	24	0.51%
2008	2,890	62.92%	1,622	35.31%	81	1.76%
2012	3,089	68.48%	1,346	29.84%	76	1.68%
2016	3,570	76.86%	887	19.10%	188	4.05%
2020	4,010	80.14%	939	18.76%	55	1.10%
2024	4,021	80.87%	886	17.82%	65	1.31%

=== Elected officials ===
Elected officials as of January 3, 2025
U.S. House	James Comer (R)	KY 1
Ky. Senate	Danny Carroll (R)	2
Ky. House	Randy Bridges (R)	3

== See also ==
- Livingston Central High School
- Dry counties
- National Register of Historic Places listings in Livingston County, Kentucky
