= Austin, Kentucky =

Unincorporated community in Kentucky, United States

Austin
- Unincorporated community
- Location within the state of Kentucky Austin (the United States)
- Coordinates: 36°49′31″N 86°1′9″W
- Country: United States
- State: Kentucky
- County: Barren
- Elevation: 771 ft (235 m)

Population (2019)
  - Total: ~1,101
- Time zone: UTC-6 (Central (CST))
  - Summer (DST): UTC-5 (CST)
- ZIP codes: 42123
- GNIS feature ID: 486146

Austin is an unincorporated community located in south-central Kentucky. Austin is located in Barren County, Kentucky, near Barren River Lake. Austin is said to have been named for "Rev. Austin" and Austin, Texas. The Austin post office opened in 1887. There used to be a general store in central Austin, but it was torn down as of late 2022.
