= Kona, Kentucky =

Unincorporated community in Kentucky, United States

- Unincorporated community
- Location in Kentucky Location in the United States
- Coordinates: 37°9′27″N 82°44′20″W
- Country: United States
- State: Kentucky
- County: Letcher
- Elevation: 1,260 ft (380 m)
- Time zone: UTC-5 (Eastern (EST))
  - Summer (DST): UTC-4 (EDT)
- ZIP codes: 41829
- GNIS feature ID: 508406

Kona is an unincorporated community and coal town in Letcher County, Kentucky, United States. The Kona Post Office closed in 1996.
