= Colmar, Kentucky =

Unincorporated community in Kentucky, United States

Colmar
- Unincorporated community
- Location within the state of Kentucky Colmar (the United States)
- Coordinates: 36°39′57″N 83°39′7″W
- Country: United States
- State: Kentucky
- County: Bell
- Elevation: 1,066 ft (325 m)
- Time zone: UTC-5 (Eastern (EST))
  - Summer (DST): UTC-4 (EDT)
- GNIS feature ID: 507733

Colmar is an unincorporated community located in Bell County, Kentucky, United States.
