= Keysburg, Kentucky =

Unincorporated community in Kentucky, United States

Coordinates: 36°39′04″N 87°00′29″W

Keysburg is an unincorporated community in Logan County, Kentucky, in the United States.

== History ==
A post office was established at Keysburg in 1834, and remained in operation until it was discontinued in 1906. The community was named for John Keys.
