= Carson, Kentucky =

Unincorporated community in Kentucky, United States

- Unincorporated community
- Location within the state of Kentucky Carson (the United States)
- Coordinates: 38°40′48″N 84°57′46″W
- Country: United States
- State: Kentucky
- County: Gallatin
- Elevation: 541 ft (165 m)
- Time zone: UTC-6 (Central (CST))
  - Summer (DST): UTC-5 (CST)
- GNIS feature ID: 507660

Carson is an unincorporated community located in Gallatin County, Kentucky, United States. It was also known as Bramelette.
