= Red Hill, Kentucky =

Unincorporated community in Kentucky, United States

Red Hill
- Unincorporated community
- Location within the state of Kentucky Red Hill (the United States)
- Coordinates: 37°21′3″N 83°20′27″W
- Country: United States
- State: Kentucky
- County: Perry
- Elevation: 801 ft (244 m)
- Time zone: UTC-5 (Eastern (EST))
  - Summer (DST): UTC-4 (EDT)
- GNIS feature ID: 2557369

Red Hill is an unincorporated community located in Perry County, Kentucky, United States.
