= Bardo, Kentucky =

Unincorporated community in Kentucky, United States

- Unincorporated community
- Location within Kentucky Location within the United States
- Coordinates: 36°45′35″N 83°20′40″W
- Country: United States
- State: Kentucky
- County: Harlan
- Elevation: 1,470 ft (450 m)
- Time zone: UTC-5 (Eastern (EST))
  - Summer (DST): UTC-4 (EDT)
- GNIS ID: 486331

Bardo is an unincorporated community and coal town in Harlan County, Kentucky, United States.

== History ==
A post office was established at Bardo in 1929, and remained in operation until 1963. The name is derived from Bordeaux, France, according to local history.
