= Chandlers Chapel, Kentucky =

Unincorporated community in Kentucky, United States

- Unincorporated community
- Location in Kentucky Location in the United States
- Coordinates: 36°56′57″N 86°47′35″W
- Country: United States
- State: Kentucky
- County: Logan
- Elevation: 630 ft (190 m)
- Time zone: UTC-6 (Central (CST))
  - Summer (DST): UTC-5 (CST)
- GNIS feature ID: 489328

Chandlers Chapel is an unincorporated community located in Logan County, Kentucky, United States.

The David Sawyer House, built in 1814 near Chandlers Chapel, has been listed on the National Register of Historic Places.

The area was impacted by an EF3 tornado just after midnight on December 11, 2021, with the Methodist Church and several homes being heavily damaged.
