= Little River (Kentucky) =

River in Trigg County, Kentucky, United States

Coordinates: 36.8556073°N 87.9736336°W

Little River is a 57.8-mile-long (93.0 km) river in Trigg County, Kentucky, in the United States. It rises in Christian County southwest of Hopkinsville where the two branches: North Fork and South Fork merge. From the confluence, it meanders northwesterly past Cadiz before emptying into Lake Barkley. It is a tributary of the Cumberland River and therefore, via the Ohio River, part of the Mississippi River watershed.

The surrounding region is low rolling hills and farmland. Bedrock consists of limestone, and there are numerous springs, caves and bluffs along the river's edge. The stream bed is composed mostly of clay and mud with some bedrock, gravel and limestone boulders.

The mean rate of flow is 765 cu ft/s (21.7 m^{3}/s).

== See also ==
- List of rivers of Kentucky
