= Elsie, Kentucky =

Unincorporated community in Kentucky, United States

- Unincorporated community
- Location within Kentucky Location within the United States
- Coordinates: 37°46′42″N 83°8′10″W
- Country: United States
- State: Kentucky
- County: Magoffin
- Elevation: 850 ft (260 m)
- Time zone: UTC-5 (Eastern (EST))
  - Summer (DST): UTC-4 (EDT)
- GNIS feature ID: 507935

Elsie is an unincorporated community in Magoffin County, Kentucky, United States. It lies along U.S. Route 460 northwest of the city of Salyersville, the county seat of Magoffin County. It sits along a stretch of the Licking River and includes the side valleys of Wolf Branch, Buck Branch, Cripple Creak, and Greasy Creak. Its elevation is 850 feet (259 m).

A post office was established in Elsie in 1911, and named for the daughter of the first postmaster.
