= Ilsley, Kentucky =

Unincorporated community in Kentucky, United States

- Unincorporated community
- Location within Kentucky Location within the United States
- Coordinates: 37°11′48″N 87°36′44″W
- Country: United States
- State: Kentucky
- County: Hopkins
- Elevation: 486 ft (148 m)
- Time zone: UTC-6 (Central (CST))
  - Summer (DST): UTC-5 (CST)
- GNIS feature ID: 494887

Ilsley is an unincorporated community and coal town located in Hopkins County, Kentucky, United States.

An act of incorporation for the town was passed in 1890. By 1902 the town had a post office. In the 1920s the community was home to mining operations with two pits each producing 500 tons a day of coal and a plant producing 650 tons of strip a day.

The Paducah and Louisville Railroad passed through the community until the tracks were removed in 2001. As of 2003 a trail was planned to replace the removed track.
