= Burna, Kentucky =

Unincorporated community in Kentucky, United States

- Census-designated place
- Location in Kentucky Location in the United States
- Coordinates: 37°14′44″N 88°21′32″W
- Country: United States
- State: Kentucky
- County: Livingston

Area
  - Total: 1.35 sq mi (3.49 km^{2})
  - Land: 1.34 sq mi (3.48 km^{2})
  - Water: 0.0039 sq mi (0.01 km^{2})
- Elevation: 551 ft (168 m)

Population (2020)
  - Total: 219
  - Density: 162.9/sq mi (62.91/km^{2})
- Time zone: UTC-6 (Central (CST))
  - Summer (DST): UTC-5 (CST)
- ZIP code: 42028
- FIPS code: 21-11188
- GNIS feature ID: 2629581

Burna is an unincorporated community and census-designated place (CDP) in central Livingston County, Kentucky, United States. As of the 2020 census, Burna had a population of 219. It is home to the North Livingston Elementary School and Livingston County Middle School.

The name was decided upon by a contest. A young girl named Burna was selected as the winner, and so the town was named after her.

== Geography ==
Burna is in central Livingston County along U.S. Route 60, which leads east 7 miles (11 km) to Salem and southwest 8 miles (13 km) to Smithland, the county seat.

According to the U.S. Census Bureau, the Burna CDP has an area of 1.4 square miles (3.5 km^{2}), of which 0.004 square miles (0.01 km^{2}), or 0.23%, are water.

== Demographics ==
Historical population
Census	Pop.	Note	%±
2020	219		—
U.S. Decennial Census

As of the 2020 census, there were 219 people, 107 housing units, and 49 families in the CDP. The racial makeup was 91.3% White, 0.9% African American, and 7.8% from two or more races. 0.9% of the population were of Hispanic or Latino origin.

The ancestry of the CDP was 59.8% American, and 5.9% Portuguese.

The median age was 62.6 years old. A total of 32.4% of the population were 65 or older, with 5.9% between 65 and, 0.0% between 75 and 84, and 26.5% were 85 or older. A total of 4.9% of the population were between the ages of 5 and 14.

A total of 26.5% of the population were in poverty. A total of 81.8% of people over 65 were in poverty.
