= Poverty, Kentucky =

Unincorporated community in Kentucky, United States

- Unincorporated community
- Location within Kentucky Location within the United States
- Coordinates: 37°34′15″N 87°19′16″W
- Country: United States
- State: Kentucky
- County: McLean
- Elevation: 400 ft (120 m)
- Time zone: UTC-6 (Central (CST))
  - Summer (DST): UTC-5 (CDT)
- GNIS feature ID: 508866

Poverty is an unincorporated community located in McLean County, Kentucky, United States. Poverty was named by William Short, a local physician who strongly disliked his snobbish neighbors. The neighbors had formed a society called "the Social Circle" whose membership conferred a perceived high social status. Poverty was meant to be an insult.

The community is located where local highway 140 connects highways 256 and 1792 west of Calhoun, Kentucky, and east of Beech Grove, Kentucky.

Poverty has been noted for its unusual place name.
