= Mary Alice, Kentucky =

Unincorporated community in Kentucky, United States

- Unincorporated community
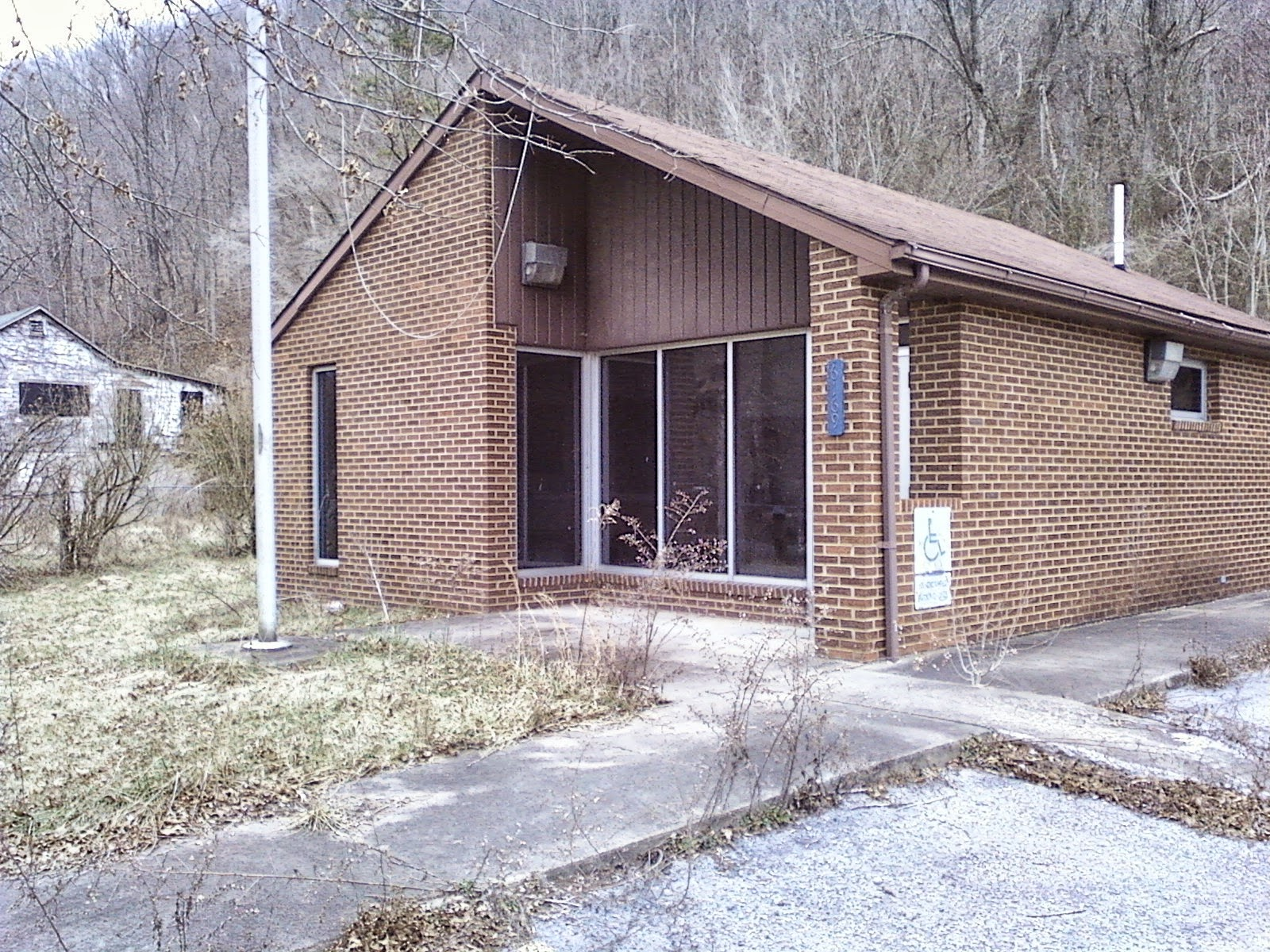
- Defunct post office at Mary Alice

- Location within Kentucky Location within the United States
- Coordinates: 36°47′3″N 83°19′48″W
- Country: United States
- State: Kentucky
- County: Harlan
- Elevation: 1,322 ft (403 m)
- Time zone: UTC-6 (Central (CST))
  - Summer (DST): UTC-5 (CST)
- ZIP codes: 40964
- GNIS feature ID: 497636

Mary Alice is an unincorporated community in Harlan County, Kentucky, United States. Its post office closed in November 2011.
