= Fountain Run, Kentucky =

- City
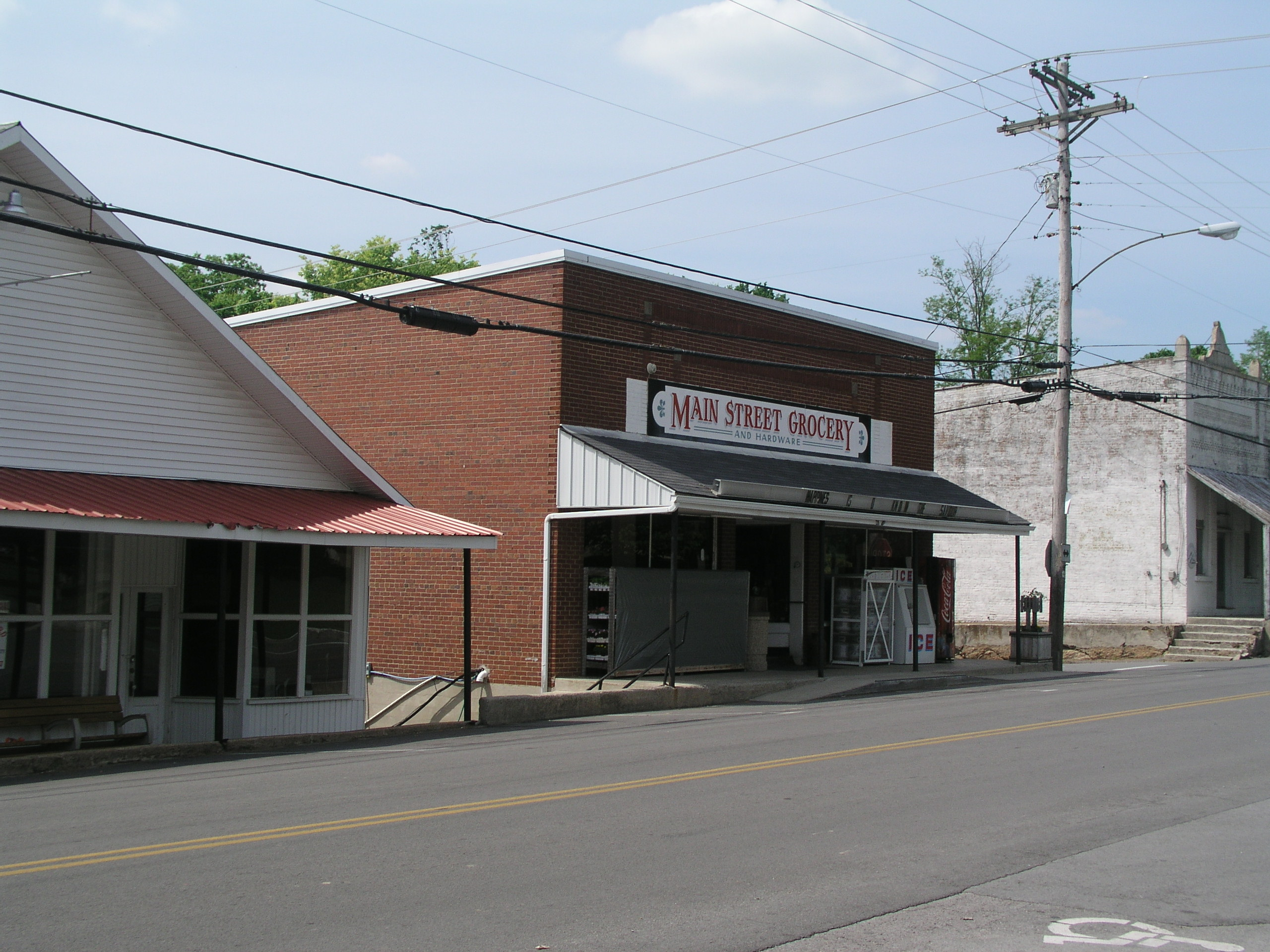
- Stores along Main Street
- Motto: "Crossroads of Three Counties"
- Location in Monroe County, Kentucky
- Coordinates: 36°43′17″N 85°57′41″W
- Country: United States
- State: Kentucky
- County: Monroe

Area
  - Total: 1.32 sq mi (3.41 km^{2})
  - Land: 1.32 sq mi (3.41 km^{2})
  - Water: 0 sq mi (0.00 km^{2})
- Elevation: 791 ft (241 m)

Population (2020)
  - Total: 216
  - Density: 164.2/sq mi (63.38/km^{2})
- Time zone: UTC-6 (Central (CST))
  - Summer (DST): UTC-5 (CDT)
- ZIP code: 42133
- Area code: 270
- FIPS code: 21-28666
- GNIS feature ID: 0492374
- Website: www.fountainrunkentucky.com

Fountain Run is a home rule-class city in Monroe County, Kentucky, in the United States. The population was 216 at the 2020 census.

== History ==
Fountain Run was originally called "Jamestown". The order establishing Jamestown on 50 acres (20 ha) of land owned by Jacob Goodman Sr. was entered in Barren County Court Order Book #4 during November Court, 1816. Jamestown, located in Monroe County after 1820, appears in public records and on maps with this name through the Civil War. The name was changed to "Fountain Run" for the new post office (1856) because of Jamestown, already established as the county seat of Russell County.

Fountain Run was formally incorporated by the state legislature in 1908.

Although not historically recorded as such, the name "Fountain Run" is traditionally believed to refer to the town's spring and stream branch, perhaps reminiscent of "run" as a name for streams in colonial Virginia.

"Jimtown" (diminutive of Jamestown) as a nickname for the town and community persisted after the new postal name of "Fountain Run" was created. For example, the "Glasgow and Jimtown turnpike road" was authorized by an act of the Kentucky Legislature (Chapter 906), February 17, 1866, as a toll road between Glasgow and Fountain Run via currently marked Kentucky Route 249, Kentucky Route 921, Defeated Creek Road, and Kentucky Route 87—see the 1879 Barren County map which reveals the most improved route of that era. This new toll road followed the route of the old "[Thomas] Flippin road" (est. 1799) to Dry Fork—Kentucky Route 249 today, then turned at the intersection to proceed via the current route of Highway 921 to Defeated Creek Road. The act also provided for a toll road branch that continued from Dry Fork via the Flippin road (a.k.a. Pikesville road after 1818) toward the "forks of Indian Creek"—also Kentucky Route 249 as straightened and improved, today. This incorporated toll road and its branch road later reverted to public roads maintained by the local magistrates, but Kentucky Route 249 retained its moniker as the "Jimtown Road" well into the 20th century. Today, this route from Glasgow to Flippin and Fountain Run is more commonly known as the "Roseville Road".

Famed musician Billy Vaughn from Glasgow, Kentucky composed (1968) the song, "The Jimtown Road", inspired by this historic Barren County route, which was recorded (1969) by The Mills Brothers, although the song's lyrics are mostly veiled references about Glasgow and Bowling Green, Kentucky, instead of Fountain Run.

Jimtown Academy was established in 1897 in Fountain Run as a school of private instruction that included "primary and preparatory departments", with W. B. Robinson as principal. Fountain Run elementary and high schools were also located here until consolidated.

The Monroe County section of Kentucky: A History of the State (1886) includes brief biographies of some prominent 19th-century citizens of the Fountain Run community. Two booklets authored by local resident Lucy Albright (1903–1985) have been widely recognized as sources of the traditional history of Fountain Run and of genealogies of some early families of the community. Histories of Monroe County that include this community have been more recently published.

== Geography ==
Fountain Run is located at 36°43′17″N 85°57′41″W (36.721319, -85.961398) in western Monroe County, near the point where Allen, Monroe, and Barren counties come together. Kentucky Route 100 passes through the south side of the community, leading east 18 miles (29 km) to Tompkinsville, the county seat, and west 16 miles (26 km) to Scottsville. Kentucky Route 87 passes through the center of Fountain Run, leading northwest 14 miles (23 km) to its terminus at Barren River Lake State Resort Park and south toward Lafayette, Tennessee, 17 miles (27 km) away.

According to the United States Census Bureau, Fountain Run has a total area of 1.32 square miles (3.42 km^{2}), of which 0.001 square miles (0.00 km^{2}), or 0.08%, are water. Spring Creek runs along the eastern border of the city, and Jakes Branch drains the western part; both streams flow south to Indian Creek, just west of its mouth at the Barren River, part of the Green River watershed.

== Demographics ==
Historical population
Census	Pop.	Note	%±
1910	188		—
1920	246		30.9%
1930	151		−38.6%
1940	334		121.2%
1950	218		−34.7%
1960	298		36.7%
1970	128		−57.0%
1980	340		165.6%
1990	259		−23.8%
2000	236		−8.9%
2010	217		−8.1%
2020	216		−0.5%
U.S. Decennial Census

As of the census of 2000, there were 236 people, 110 households, and 66 families residing in the city. The population density was 241.6 inhabitants per square mile (93.3/km^{2}). There were 119 housing units at an average density of 121.8 per square mile (47.0/km^{2}). The racial makeup of the city was 95.76% White, 2.54% African American, 1.69% from other races. Hispanic or Latino of any race were 1.69% of the population.

There were 110 households, out of which 25.5% had children under the age of 18 living with them, 45.5% were married couples living together, 13.6% had a female householder with no husband present, and 39.1% were non-families. 36.4% of all households were made up of individuals, and 29.1% had someone living alone who was 65 years of age or older. The average household size was 2.15 and the average family size was 2.81.

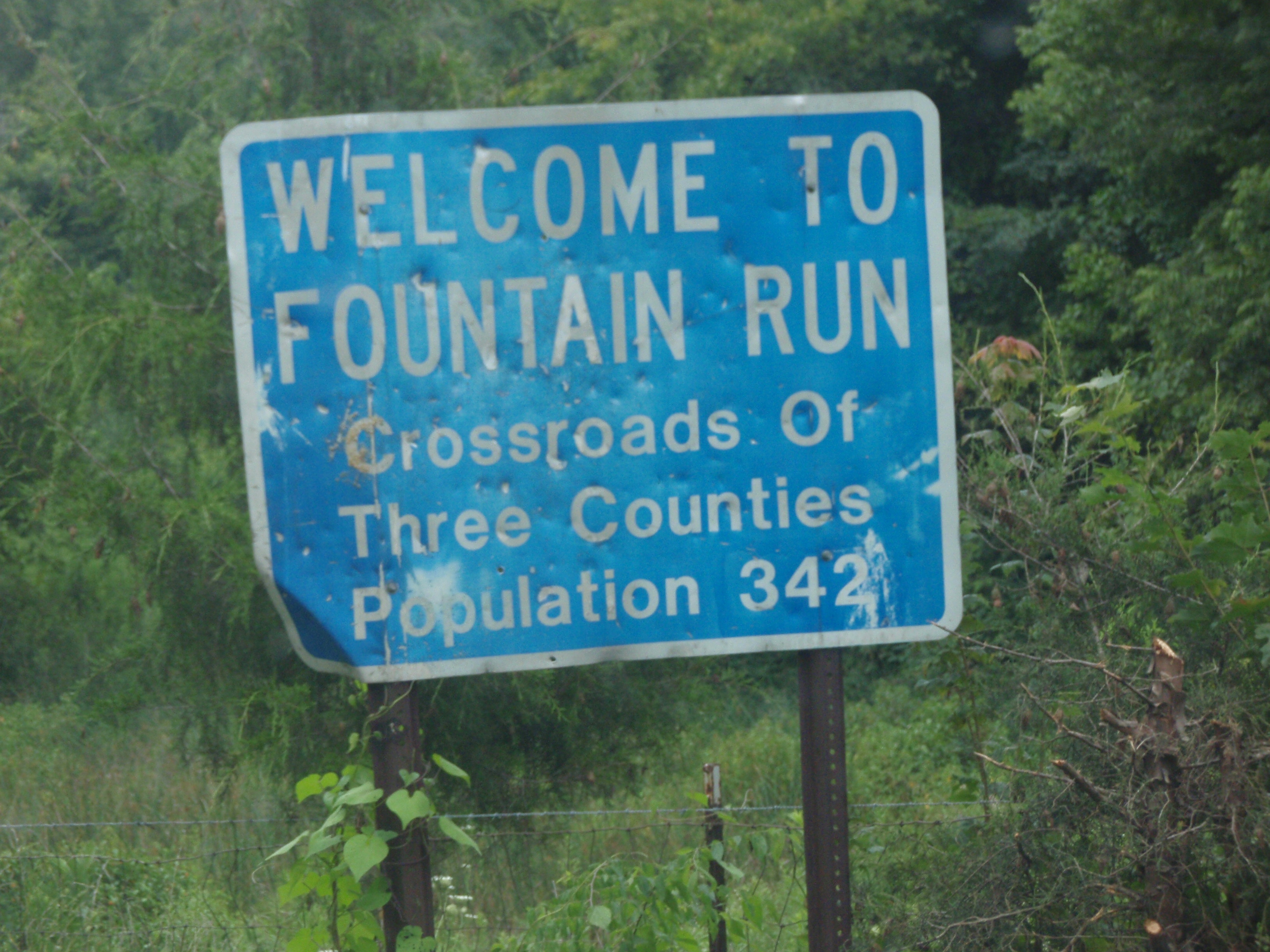
Fountain Run sign proclaiming the town "Crossroads of Three Counties" – Monroe, Allen, and Barren Counties.

In the city, the population was spread out, with 23.7% under the age of 18, 6.8% from 18 to 24, 20.8% from 25 to 44, 22.0% from 45 to 64, and 26.7% who were 65 years of age or older. The median age was 44 years. For every 100 females, there were 71.0 males. For every 100 females age 18 and over, there were 68.2 males.

The median income for a household in the city was $11,591, and the median income for a family was $26,875. Males had a median income of $21,250 versus $23,750 for females. The per capita income for the city was $18,547. About 22.8% of families and 27.6% of the population were below the poverty line, including 14.8% of those under the age of eighteen and 44.4% of those 65 or over.
