= Salem, Kentucky =

- City
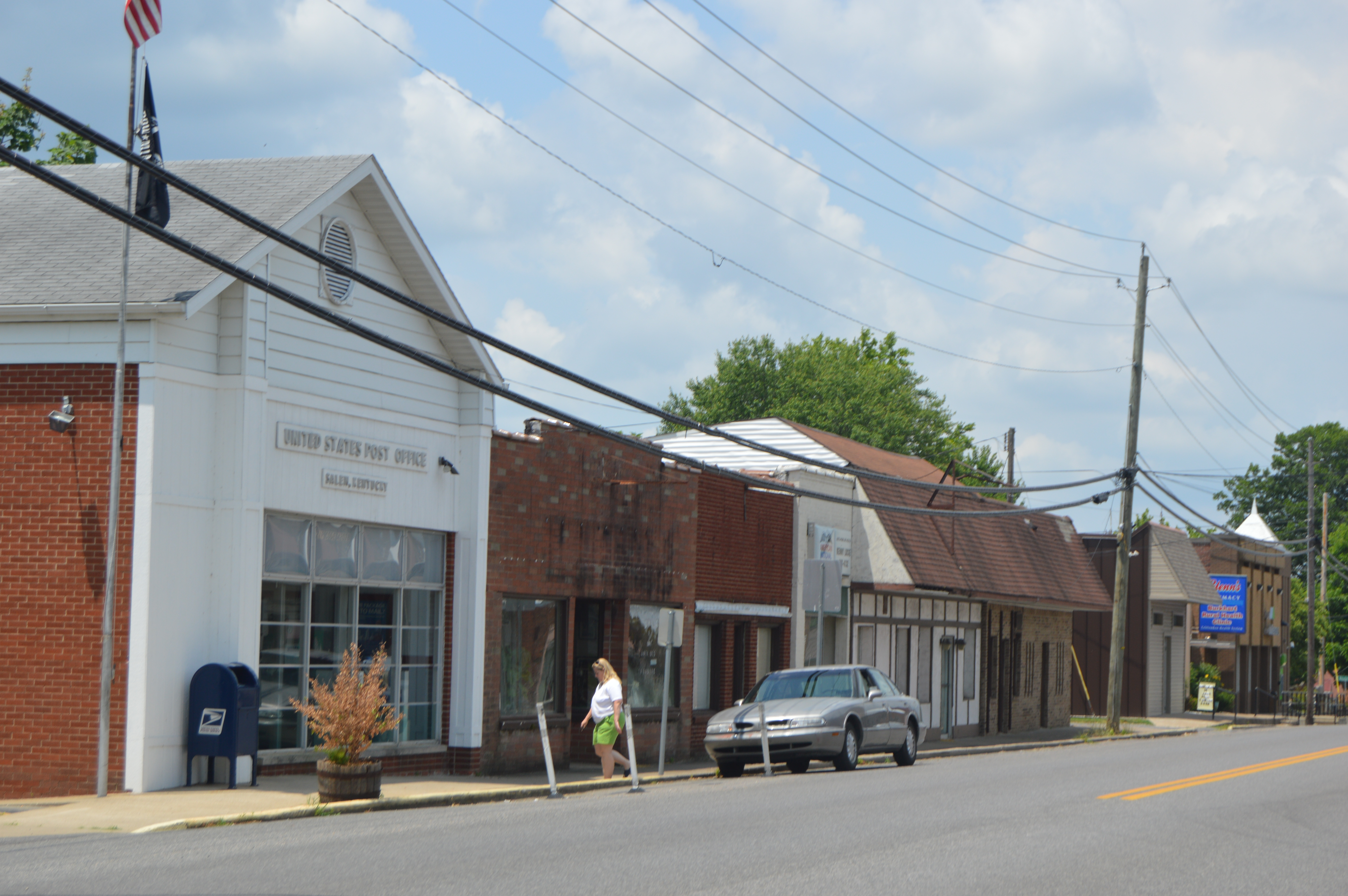
- Main Street downtown

- Location of Salem in Livingston County, Kentucky.
- Coordinates: 37°15′53″N 88°14′28″W
- Country: United States
- State: Kentucky
- County: Livingston
- Established: before 1816
- Incorporated: 1869
- Named after: the Carolinian hometown of the original settlers

Area
  - Total: 0.85 sq mi (2.21 km^{2})
  - Land: 0.85 sq mi (2.21 km^{2})
  - Water: 0.0039 sq mi (0.01 km^{2})
- Elevation: 463 ft (141 m)

Population (2020)
  - Total: 722
  - Density: 847.8/sq mi (327.33/km^{2})
- Time zone: UTC-6 (Central (CST))
  - Summer (DST): UTC-5 (CDT)
- ZIP code: 42078
- Area codes: 270 & 364
- FIPS code: 21-68052
- GNIS feature ID: 2405405
- Website: https://www.cityofsalemky.gov/

Salem is a home rule-class city in Livingston County, Kentucky, in the United States. Salem is part of the Paducah, KY-IL metropolitan statistical area. As of the 2020 census, Salem had a population of 722. It is the second-largest community and largest village in Livingston County, but the census-designated place of Ledbetter has more than two times the population of Salem.

== History ==
The city is believed to have been settled c. 1800 by immigrants from Salem, North Carolina, who named their new community after their former home. It replaced Centerville as Livingston County's seat in 1809, but it was replaced in turn by Smithland in 1842, after the removal of Crittenden County left it more centrally located.

== Geography ==
Salem is located at 37°15′53″N 88°14′28″W (37.264694, -88.241221). According to the United States Census Bureau, the city has a total area of 0.8 square miles (2.1 km^{2}), all land.

== Demographics ==
Historical population
Census	Pop.	Note	%±
1830	281		—
1840	233		−17.1%
1860	192		—
1870	50		−74.0%
1880	132		164.0%
1900	208		—
1910	320		53.8%
1920	252		−21.2%
1970	593		—
1980	833		40.5%
1990	770		−7.6%
2000	769		−0.1%
2010	752		−2.2%
2020	722		−4.0%
U.S. Decennial Census

At the 2000 census there were 769 people in 322 households, including 202 families, in the city. The population density was 987.6 inhabitants per square mile (381.3/km^{2}). There were 370 housing units at an average density of 475.2 per square mile (183.5/km^{2}). The racial makup of the city was 99.22% White, 0.26% African American, 0.13% from other races, and 0.39% from two or more races. Hispanic or Latino of any race were 0.65%.

Of the 322 households 20.8% had children under the age of 18 living with them, 51.9% were married couples living together, 8.1% had a female householder with no husband present, and 37.0% were non-families. 34.2% of households were one person and 23.0% were one person aged 65 or older. The average household size was 2.14 and the average family size was 2.72.

The age distribution was 16.9% under the age of 18, 6.6% from 18 to 24, 19.9% from 25 to 44, 25.1% from 45 to 64, and 31.5% 65 or older. The median age was 51 years. For every 100 females, there were 80.9 males. For every 100 females age 18 and over, there were 80.5 males.

The median household income was $29,196 and the median family income was $37,857. Males had a median income of $29,375 versus $20,000 for females. The per capita income for the city was $16,156. About 7.1% of families and 10.7% of the population were below the poverty line, including 14.8% of those under age 18 and 12.3% of those age 65 or over.
