= Special routes of U.S. Route 41 =

Special routes of U.S. Route 41

Highway system
- United States Numbered Highway System; List; Special; Divided

Several special routes of U.S. Route 41 exist, including three in Wisconsin. In order from south to north they are as follows.

== Existing ==
=== Fort Myers business loop ===
U.S. Highway 41 Business
- Location: Fort Myers, Florida
- Existed: 1964–present

U.S. Route 41 Business is a former segment of U.S. Route 41 in Downtown Fort Myers and North Fort Myers, Florida. North of State Road 80, it carries the hidden designation State Road 739.

The road begins at the interchange of US 41 and SR State Road 80-82-867, historically known as the Five Points Interchange. The road briefly overlaps SR 80 along Main and Monroe Streets, where it becomes discontinuous (it once continued east along with SR 80 though downtown along the then-one-way First Street and Second Street but those streets were turned over to city control in 2006).

Business US 41 resumes along SR 739 at SR 80, where it runs along Park Avenue (northbound) and Fowler Street (southbound) until they reach the Edison Bridge where the two streets merge. After crossing over the Caloosahatchee River BUS 41 enters North Fort Myers where it briefly becomes a six-lane undivided highway only for the divider to return north of Cabanna Avenue. The road heads north, intersecting with State Road 78. Between State Road 78 and Powell Drive, the road becomes a four-lane divided highway for the remainder of the route. The road finally ends at a former wye at US 41.

=== Venice business loop ===
U.S. Highway 41 Business
- Location: Venice, Florida
- Existed: 1965–present

U.S. Route 41 Business is a former segment of U.S. Route 41 and an existing segment of the Tamiami Trail in Venice, Florida that begins near Shamrock Boulevard in Venice Gardens and terminates at Venetia Bay Boulevard in the Eastgate section of Venice. The existing US 41 in Venice runs along the Venice Bypass (hidden SR 45A).

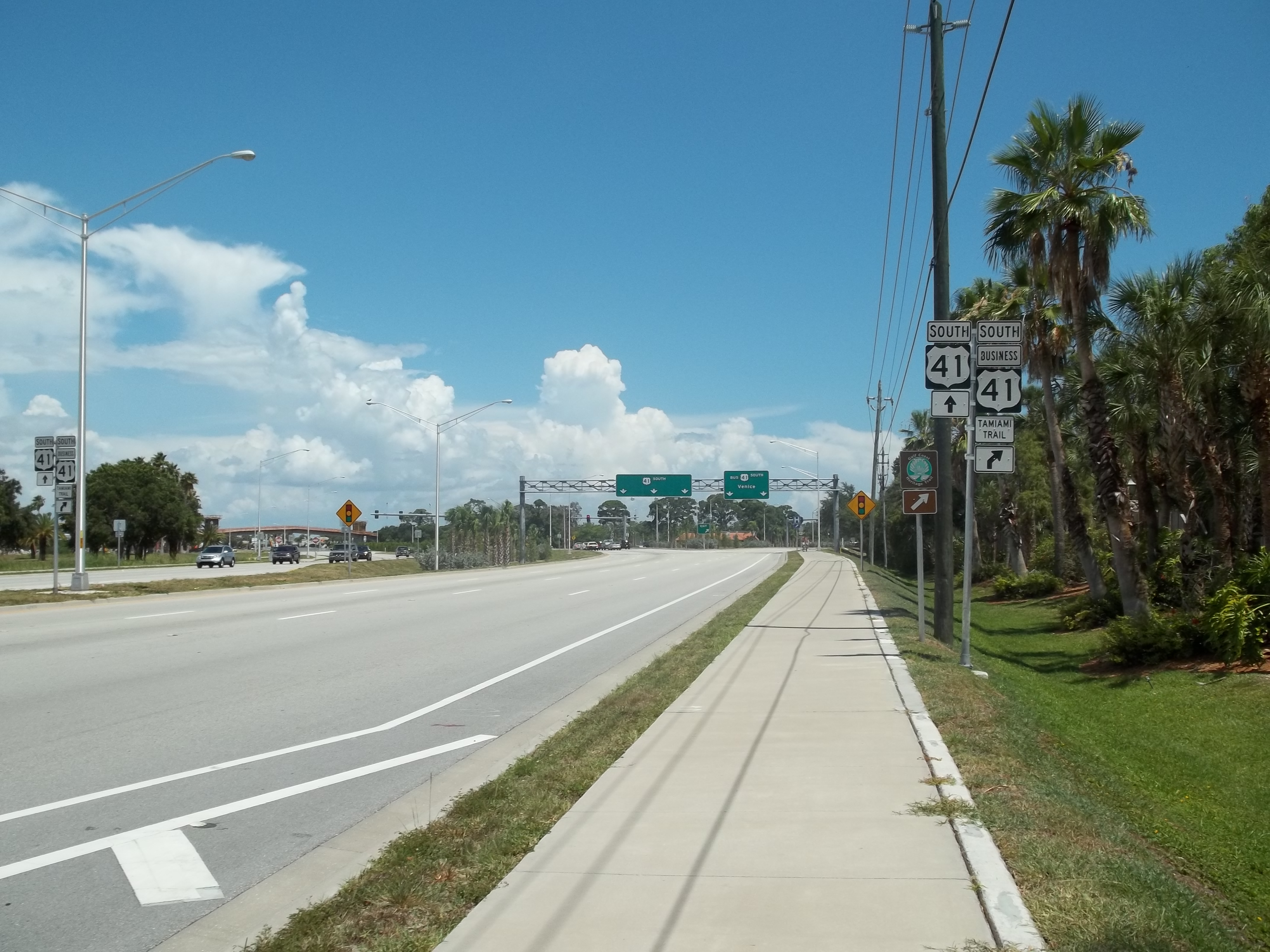
Southbound US 41 approaching Venice business loop. Note the movement of Tamiami Trail away from mainline US 41.

Major intersections
The entire route is in Sarasota County.

Location	mi	km	Destinations	Notes
	0.000	0.000	US 41 south (Tamiami Trail / SR 45)	
	0.263	0.423	To US 41 north (SR 45A north) / Center Road	
Venice	0.44	0.71	Circus Bridge over Gulf Intracoastal Waterway	
Venice	2.249	3.619	To I-75 / Venice Avenue (CR 772 east)	
Venice	2.50	4.02	Kentucky Military Institute Bridge over Hatchett Creek (Gulf Intracoastal Waterway)	
Venice	2.928	4.712	US 41 (Tamiami Trail / SR 45 north / SR 45A south)	
1.000 mi = 1.609 km; 1.000 km = 0.621 mi

=== Bradenton business loop ===
U.S. Highway 41 Business
- Location: Bradenton-Memphis, Florida
- Length: 6.118 mi (9.846 km)

U.S. Route 41 Business is an alternate route and former segment of U.S. Route 41 in Bradenton, Florida that begins at State Road 684 (Cortez Boulevard West) where it runs along 14th Street until it makes a sharp right turn onto 8th Avenue West and then makes another sharp left onto 9th Street West before intersecting with State Road 64 on eastbound 6th Avenue West and westbound Manatee Avenue West. The road continues north as it passes by South Florida Museum and Bradenton Riverwalk before crossing the Green Bridge and moving onto 8th Avenue W in Palmetto where it intersects 10th Street West, which leads to State Road 43 where the northern concurrency of U.S. Route 41 and U.S. Route 301. As 8th Avenue West passes by 21st Street West, it becomes Valencia Drive and curves to the northeast before terminating at an interchange with US 41 just south of the interchange between US 41 and US 19 in Memphis.

Major intersections
The entire route is in Manatee County.

Location	mi	km	Destinations	Notes
	0.000	0.000	US 41 / SR 684 west (Cortez Road / 14th Street West / SR 45 south) – Sarasota, Beaches	
Bradenton	2.393	3.851	SR 64 east (6th Avenue West)	
Bradenton	2.481	3.993	SR 64 west (Manatee Avenue)	
	2.748– 3.472	4.422– 5.588	Green Bridge over Manatee River	
Palmetto	4.267	6.867	To US 301 / 10th Street West (SR 43 north) – Ellenton	
Palmetto	6.118	9.846	US 41 north (SR 45 / SR 55) – Ruskin	interchange
1.000 mi = 1.609 km; 1.000 km = 0.621 mi

=== Tampa business loop ===
U.S. Highway 41 Business
- Location: Tampa-Lutz, Florida
- Length: 16.703 mi (26.881 km)
- Existed: 1931 as US 541, 1951 as US 41 Bus.–present

U.S. Route 41 Business is an alternate route to U.S. Route 41 in Tampa, Florida that begins on the Nebraska Avenue-Florida Avenue apex in Lutz and continues south on Florida Avenue. Just south of Hillsborough Avenue (U.S. Route 92), Florida Avenue becomes a one-way street and the south-bound portion splits off into Highland Avenue and later Tampa Street until Downtown Tampa. The route joins State Road 60 at the one way couplet of Kennedy Boulevard (northbound) and Jackson Street (southbound). Jackson Street rejoins Kennedy Boulevard at Meridian Avenue in the Channelside District and the route continues east for 3 blocks until turning north on Channelside Drive. Shortly after, the route makes a slight curve east onto Adamo Drive until the two routes depart at 21st Street (southbound) and 22nd Street (northbound). The route continues south and 21st Street merges back with 22nd Street shortly before a parclo interchange with SR 618 (Selmon Expressway) and crosses over McKay Bay along the Licata Bridge. The route makes a slight curve and continues east as Causeway Boulevard until it reaches its southern terminus near Port Tampa Bay at US 41 (50th Street) and State Road 676 (Causeway Boulevard).

U.S. Route 541 was created in 1931 as a western alternate to US 41 between Palmetto and Tampa; US 41 then followed the present US 301 between those points. In 1938, US 41 was moved from Tampa north to Lutz, and the old route became an extension of US 541. US 541 was eliminated in 1951; the route north from Tampa became US 41 Business, while south from Tampa it became US 41, with old US 41 becoming an extension of US 301.

Major intersections
The entire route is in Hillsborough County.

Location	mi	km	Destinations	Notes
	0.000	0.000	US 41 (South 50th Street / SR 45 south / SR 599 north) / SR 676 east (Causeway Boulevard) – Tampa, Gibsonton	
Tampa	1.875– 2.185	3.018– 3.516	22nd Street Causeway over McKay Bay	
Tampa	3.4	5.5	I-4 (SR 400)	I-4 exit 1
Tampa	3.53	5.68	SR 618 (Selmon Expressway) to I-75 – Brandon, Tampa, St. Petersburg	SR 618 exit 9
Tampa	3.722	5.990	SR 60 east (Adamo Drive) / 22nd Street north	south end of SR 60 overlap; 22nd Street is former SR 585
Tampa	4.965	7.990	To SR 618 east (Selmon Expressway express lanes) / Meridian Avenue (SR 618A) – Brandon	one-block SR 618A overlap (southbound only)
Tampa	5.053	8.132	SR 45 north (Nebraska Avenue) to SR 618 east (Selmon Expressway local lanes)	north end of SR 45 overlap
Tampa	5.271	8.483	To SR 618 (Selmon Expressway) / I-4 east / I-275 north / Jefferson Street North – Brandon, St. Petersburg	
Tampa	5.492	8.839	SR 60 west (Kennedy Boulevard East / SR 685 south) To SR 618 west (Selmon Expressway) / Tampa Street	north end of SR 60 overlap; south end of SR 685 overlap
Tampa	6.096	9.811	To I-275 north / I-4 east / Scott Street	
Tampa	6.161	9.915	I-275 south (SR 93) / Kay Street – St. Petersburg	I-275 exit 44
Tampa	7.828	12.598	SR 574 (Dr. M.L. King Jr. Boulevard) to I-275	
Tampa	8.840	14.227	US 92 (Hillsborough Avenue / SR 600) to I-275	
Tampa	11.379	18.313	SR 580 (Busch Boulevard) to I-275 – Busch Gardens	
Tampa	12.870	20.712	SR 582 east (East Fowler Avenue) to I-275	
	13.880	22.338	SR 579 east / CR 582A west (Fletcher Avenue) to I-275	
	15.174	24.420	SR 678 east / CR 678 west (Bearss Avenue) to I-275	
Lutz	16.703	26.881	US 41 north (SR 45)	
1.000 mi = 1.609 km; 1.000 km = 0.621 mi: Concurrency terminus

=== Valdosta business loop ===
U.S. Highway 41 Business
- Location: Valdosta, Georgia
- Length: 7.0 mi (11.3 km)

U.S. Route 41 Business (US 41 Bus.) is a 7.0-mile-long (11.3 km) business route of US 41 that travels through the city of Valdosta, Georgia, along with State Route 7 Business (SR 7 Bus.). It utilizes the former path of US 41 and SR 7 through the city, while US 41/SR 7 has been rerouted to Inner Perimeter Road around the eastern edges of the city. The entire length of US 41 Bus. is part of the National Highway System, a system of routes determined to be the most important for the nation's economy, mobility, and defense.

Major intersections
The entire route is in Lowndes County.

Location	mi	km	Destinations	Notes
	0.0	0.0	US 41 / SR 7 / SR 31 (Inner Perimeter Road)	Southern terminus of US 41 Bus./SR 7 Bus.; southern end of SR 7 Bus. concurrency
Valdosta	3.3	5.3	I-75 BL north / US 84 east / US 221 north / SR 38 east (Hill Avenue)	one-way pairs; northern terminus of I-75 Bus.
Valdosta	3.4	5.5	I-75 BL south / US 84 west / US 221 south / SR 38 west (Central Avenue) to I-75	one-way pairs; northern terminus of I-75 Bus.
Valdosta	5.2	8.4	SR 125 north (Bemiss Road)	Southern terminus of SR 125
Valdosta	7.0	11.3	US 41 / SR 7 (Perimeter Road / Valdosta Road) – Atlanta	Northern terminus of US 41 Bus./SR 7 Bus.; northern end of SR 7 Bus. concurrency; Valdosta Road continues.
1.000 mi = 1.609 km; 1.000 km = 0.621 mi: Concurrency terminus

=== Macon business loop ===
U.S. Highway 41 Business
- Location: Macon, Georgia
- Length: 7.9 mi (12.7 km)

U.S. Route 41 Business (US 41 Bus.) begins at the northern terminus of the US 41/US 129 overlap, where it shares a concurrency with Georgia State Route 49 (SR 49). Along the way, US 80/SR 22 joins the concurrency. When US 80/US 129 intersects Walnut Street, US 41 Bus./SR 49 turns left and travels concurrent with SR 22 until the intersection with Second Street, where that route turns north. US 41 Bus. turns south at Spring Street, where SR 49 turns north and it is joined by another concurrency with SR 19. US 41 Bus./SR 19 travels south until turning west at Georgia Avenue until splitting into a one-way pair at the intersection with College Street. From that point, northbound US 41 Bus./SR 49 continues west along Georgia Avenue until it reaches Hardeman Avenue, while southbound US 41 Bus./SR 49 travels east along Forsyth Road then turns north along College Street. After a split-diamond interchange with Interstate 75 (I-75; exit 149) and SR 540 where the northbound routes go over the Joe A. Witherington Bridge while the southbound routes go over the Raymond Berry Oakley III Bridge, the one-way pair ends as Hardeman Avenue and Forsyth Street converge and becomes Vineville Avenue. US 41 Bus. terminates at US 41 and SR 247, while SR 19 continues along Vineville Avenue, joined by US 41 until it terminates in Forsyth. The portion of US 41 Bus. from the northern end of the US 80 and US 129/SR 11 concurrencies to the northern terminus, is part of the National Highway System, a system of routes determined to be the most important for the nation's economy, mobility, and defense.

=== Griffin business loop ===
U.S. Highway 41 Business
- Location: Griffin, Georgia

U.S. Route 41 Business (US 41 Bus.) in Griffin, Georgia is completely concurrent with US 19 Bus. It begins at the intersection of US 19/SR 3 and US 41/SR 7 with SR 155, and follows SR 155 north around Griffin–Spalding County Airport. Then it turns west at SR 16 until it curves onto SR 92 until finally ending at a wye interchange with US 19/US 41/SR 3. All of US 41 Bus. from the southern end of the SR 16 concurrency to the northern terminus is part of the National Highway System, a system of routes determined to be the most important for the nation's economy, mobility, and defense.

=== Ringgold truck route ===
U.S. Highway 41 Truck
- Location: Ringgold, Georgia

U.S. Route 41 Truck is a short truck detour around a low railroad bridge in Ringgold, Georgia, which is also overlapped by U.S. Route 76 Truck, as well as Georgia State Route 151 and Georgia Route 151 Spur.

=== Monteagle, TN-Hopkinsville, KY alternate route ===
U.S. Route 41A
- Location: Monteagle, Tennessee–Hopkinsville, Kentucky

U.S. Route 41 Alternate (signed U.S. Route 41A in Tennessee), as of 2005, has a northern terminus in Hopkinsville, Kentucky, 10 miles (16 km) north of the Tennessee line. It serves the city of Clarksville, Tennessee on its way to Nashville, where it briefly runs concurrently with US 41. It then separates again to serve Shelbyville, Winchester, and Tullahoma before rejoining the main route atop Monteagle Mountain. US 41A runs west of US 41 for its entire length, aside from one mile (1.6 km) in downtown Nashville, where they are concurrent. US-41A is also concurrent with U.S. Route 31A from Nashville to Triune, Tennessee, for a distance of approximately 25 miles (40 km).

=== Clarksville alternate route bypass ===
U.S. Route 41A Bypass
- Location: Clarksville, Tennessee

U.S. Route 41A Bypass (US 41A Byp.) is a bypass of the city of Clarksville, Tennessee, on its south side. It first splits off from the US 41A mainline at 2nd Street and Kraft, following Riverside Drive south, running concurrently with SR 13 and SR 12, along the Cumberland River to an intersection with SR 48 (College Street). It becomes concurrent with SR 48 and they travel south and leave town to an intersection with Cumberland Drive, where SR 13 and SR 48 split off to continue southward. The bypass then curves to the east, still following the river, and enters some neighborhoods and comes to an intersection with Ashland City Road, where SR 12 splits off and goes toward Ashland City. US 41A Byp. then continues east and comes to an end at an intersection with US 41A (Madison Street) and SR 76 (M.L.K. Jr. Parkway). Most of the road is a two-lane highway, occasionally widening to three lanes to accommodate truck traffic on hills.

=== Hopkinsville truck route ===
U.S. Route 41 Truck
- Location: Hopkinsville, Kentucky
- Length: 5.516 mi (8.877 km)

U.S. Route 41 Truck (US 41 Truck) is a 5.516-mile (8.877 km) truck route designed for thru traffic, mainly trucks, through Hopkinsville, Kentucky. It follows Interstate 169 from exit 7 to exit 12, and Kentucky Route 1682 west from the interchange to U.S. 41 north of Hopkinsville.

Major intersections
The entire route is in Hopkinsville, Christian County.

mi	km	Exit	Destinations	Notes
0.000	0.000	7	I-169 south / US 41 Alt. (Fort Campbell Boulevard) to I-24 – Nashville	Southern terminus; south end of I-169 overlap
1.074	1.728	8	US 41 / KY 109 – Hopkinsville, Pembroke	
2.495	4.015	9	US 68 / KY 80 – Hopkinsville, Elkton	
4.831	7.775	12	I-169 north / KY 1682 east (Dr Martin Luther King Jr Way) – Madisonville, Henderson	North end of I-169 overlap; south end of KY 1682 overlap
5.516	8.877		US 41 (North Main Street / Madisonville Road) / KY 1682 west (Eagle Way)	Northern terminus; north end of KY 1682 overlap
1.000 mi = 1.609 km; 1.000 km = 0.621 mi: Concurrency terminus

=== Madisonville-Henderson alternate route ===
U.S. Route 41 Alternate
- Location: Madisonville–Henderson, Kentucky
- Length: 50.371 mi (81.064 km)

Known and referred to locally as "US 41A" but signed as "Alternate US 41," this highway follows what was the original route of US 41 between the cities of Madisonville and Henderson, Kentucky. It travels largely from east to west from its southern terminus at US 41 on Madisonville's north side until reaching Kentucky Route 814 (KY 814) east of Providence. From that point, the highway begins its turn toward the north, passing mostly through rural areas but also serving the small communities of Dixon and Poole. Major highways intersecting the route include:

- KY 120, which travels from Marion to Slaughters
- KY 132, which travels from KY 120 through Clay and Dixon to Sebree
- KY 56, which begins at the Ohio River near Old Shawneetown, Illinois and connects the Kentucky communities of Morganfield, Sebree, Beech Grove, and Owensboro
- KY 425, which serves as a southern bypass of Henderson
- and US 60, which US 41A joins on the south side of Henderson for its final four miles (6.4 km).

US 41A's northern terminus is at "The Cloverleaf," the interchange between US 60 and I-69/US 41 on Henderson's north side. It is also former US 43.

Major intersections

County	Location	mi	km	Destinations	Notes
Hopkins	Madisonville	0.000	0.000	US 41 (North Main Street) / KY 281 north (Island Ford Road)	Southern terminus; southern terminus of KY 281; continues as KY 281 beyond US 41
Hopkins	Madisonville	0.370	0.595	KY 1581 south (Pride Avenue) / Pride Avenue	Northern terminus of KY 1581
Hopkins	Madisonville	1.903	3.063	KY 1178 east	Western terminus of KY 1178
Hopkins	Madisonville	2.552	4.107	KY 2337 north (Tucker Schoolhouse Road)	Southern terminus of KY 2337
Hopkins	Manitou	5.010	8.063	KY 630 south (Columbia Schoolhouse Road)	South end of KY 630 overlap
Hopkins	Manitou	5.220	8.401	KY 630 north (Manitou Road)	North end of KY 630 overlap
Hopkins		7.154	11.513	KY 2320 south (Happy Lane)	Northern terminus of KY 2320
Hopkins	Nebo	8.794	14.153	KY 502 (South Bernard Street / North Bernard Street)	
Hopkins		9.685	15.586	KY 1089 north (Donaldson Road)	Southern terminus of KY 1089
Hopkins		11.038	17.764	KY 2280 south (Schmetzer Crossing Road)	Northern terminus of KY 2280
Webster	Providence	13.748	22.125	KY 814 south (Edgewood Drive)	Northern terminus of KY 814
Webster	Providence	14.472	23.290	KY 120 (Westerfield Drive)	
Webster	Providence	14.602	23.500	KY 670 west	Eastern terminus of KY 670
Webster		18.481	29.742	KY 270 west	Eastern terminus of KY 270
Webster		19.138	30.800	KY 2836 east (Jolly Liberty Road)	Western terminus of KY 2836
Webster	Dixon	21.668	34.871	KY 1340 west (Clay-Dixon Road)	Eastern terminus of KY 1340
Webster	Dixon	23.288	37.478	KY 132 (Leiper Street)	
Webster	Dixon	23.509	37.834	KY 2087 south (Clayton Avenue)	Northern terminus of KY 2087
Webster	Dixon	23.587	37.960	KY 983 north	Southern terminus of KY 983
Webster		26.149	42.083	KY 1063 south	Northern terminus of KY 1063
Webster		28.873	46.467	KY 873 south	Northern terminus of KY 873
Webster		28.877	46.473	KY 56 west	South end of KY 56 overlap
Webster		30.381	48.893	KY 2839 south	Northern terminus of KY 2839
Webster	Poole	32.806	52.796	KY 56 east / KY 145 north	North end of KY 56 overlap; southern terminus of KY 145
Henderson		35.897	57.771	KY 416 east	Western terminus of KY 416
Henderson		37.292	60.016	KY 2253 west (Cairo Dixie Road) / Cairo-Dixie Street	Eastern terminus of KY 2253
Henderson		38.934	62.658	KY 266 west	Eastern terminus of KY 266
Henderson		40.503	65.183	KY 443 south (Rudy Road)	Northern terminus of KY 443
Henderson		44.241	71.199	KY 425 (Henderson Bypass)	
Henderson		44.333	71.347	KY 285 north (Old Madisonville Road)	Southern terminus of KY 285
Henderson	Henderson	46.029	74.076	US 60 west / KY 136 west (South Green Street) / Borax Drive	South end of US 60 / KY 136 overlap
Henderson	Henderson	47.457	76.375	KY 136 east (Sand Lane) / Sand Lane	East end of KY 136 overlap
Henderson	Henderson	48.858	78.629	KY 351 north (Second Street) / Second Street	Southern terminus of KY 351
Henderson	Henderson	50.371	81.064	US 41 / US 60 east to I-69 south – Evansville, Madisonville, Owensboro	Northern terminus; north end of US 60 overlap; interchange; US 41 exits 15A-B; continues as US 60 beyond US 41
1.000 mi = 1.609 km; 1.000 km = 0.621 mi: Concurrency terminus

== Former ==
=== Atlanta business loop ===
U.S. Highway 41 Business
- Location: Clayton and Fulton counties
- Existed: 1953–1965

U.S. Route 41 Business (US 41 Bus.) was a business route of US 41 that existed in Clayton and Fulton counties. It partially traveled in Atlanta. At least as early as 1919, SR 3 traveled on essentially the same path as it currently does in the northern part of Clayton County and the southeastern part of Fulton County. By the end of 1926, US 41 had been designated on the entire length of SR 3 in these counties. The segment of the highway from just north-northwest of the Henry–Clayton county line to Marietta had a "completed hard surface". By the end of 1929, US 19 was designated on SR 3 in the two counties to the main part of Atlanta.

In 1953, US 19/US 41/SR 3 was shifted eastward onto the "Expressway" (the precursor of Interstate 75 (I-75)) in the southern part of Atlanta, traveled west on Lakewood Avenue, and then resumed the northern path. The former path became US 19 Bus./US 41 Bus. By the end of 1965, US 19/US 41/SR 3 was shifted onto the former path of US 19 Bus./US 41 Bus. in the Atlanta area.

=== Atlanta–Marietta alternate route ===
U.S. Highway 41 Alternate
- Location: Atlanta–Marietta, Georgia
- Existed: 1948–1949

U.S. Route 41 Alternate (US 41 Alt.) was an alternate route of US 41 that existed from Atlanta to Marietta, Georgia. It traversed portions of Fulton and Cobb counties. At least as early as 1919, SR 3 traveled on essentially the same path as it currently does in these two cities. By the end of 1926, US 41 had been designated on the entire length of SR 3 from Atlanta to Marietta. This entire portion of US 41/SR 3 had a "completed hard surface". By the end of 1929, US 19 was designated on this segment of highway.

Late in 1937, SR 3 was split into two parts between Atlanta and the northwest part of Marietta. By the end of the year, SR 3W was established, traveling northwest with US 41 on Marietta Street and Old Marietta Road. By the end of 1946, SR 3W in Atlanta and Marietta was redesignated as part of the SR 3 mainline. By February 1948, the segment of US 41 on SR 3W in this area was redesignated as US 41 Alt. By April 1949, US 41 Alt. was redesignated as US 41 Byp.

=== Atlanta–Marietta bypass route ===
U.S. Highway 41 Bypass
- Location: Atlanta–Marietta, Georgia
- Existed: 1949–1950

U.S. Route 41 Bypass (US 41 Byp.) was a bypass route of US 41 that existed from Atlanta to Marietta, Georgia. It traversed portions of Fulton and Cobb counties. At least as early as 1919, SR 3 traveled on essentially the same path as it currently does in these two cities. By the end of 1926, US 41 had been designated on the entire length of SR 3 from Atlanta to Marietta. This entire segment of US 41/SR 3 had a "completed hard surface".

Late in 1937, SR 3 was split into two parts between Atlanta and the northwest part of Marietta. By the end of the year, SR 3W was established, traveling northwest with US 41 on Marietta Street and Old Marietta Road, while SR 3E traveled north-northwest on Hemphill Street and Northside Drive. By the end of 1946, SR 3W was redesignated as part of the SR 3 mainline. By February 1948, the segment of US 41 on SR 3W in this area was redesignated as US 41 Alt. By April 1949, US 41 Alt. was redesignated as US 41 Byp. By the middle of 1950, US 41 Byp. was redesignated as part of the US 41 mainline.

=== Atlanta–Marietta temporary route ===
U.S. Highway 41 Temporary
- Location: Atlanta–Marietta, Georgia
- Existed: 1948–1952

U.S. Route 41 Temporary (US 41 Temp.) was a temporary iteration of US 41 that existed from Atlanta to Marietta, Georgia. It traversed portions of Fulton and Cobb counties. At least as early as 1919, SR 3 traveled on essentially the same path as it currently does in these two cities. By the end of 1926, US 41 had been designated on the entire length of SR 3 from Atlanta to Marietta. This entire segment of US 41/SR 3 had a "completed hard surface".

Late in 1937, SR 3 was split into two parts between Atlanta and the northwest part of Marietta. US 41/SR 3 traveled northwest on the original path, while SR 3E traveled on a more easterly path between the two cities. SR 3E's path from SR 120 in the east part of Marietta to US 41/SR 3 in the northwestern part of the city had completed grading, but was not surfaced. The rest of SR 3E was under construction. By the end of the year, SR 3E traveled north-northwest on Hemphill Street and Northside Drive. All of SR 3E in the northern part of Atlanta was hard surfaced. From the north part of the city to the northwest part, the highway had completed grading, but was not surfaced. Later that year, all of SR 3E from Atlanta to northwest of the Fulton–Cobb county line had a completed hard surface.

In 1940, nearly the entire segment of SR 3E in Marietta had a completed hard surface. It was under construction from northwest of the Fulton–Cobb county line to the eastern part of Marietta. By the end of the next year, the entire length of SR 3E had a completed hard surface. By February 1948, SR 3E was moved off of Hemphill Avenue. It, along with US 41 Temp., followed US 19 on Spring Street, then traveled west on 14th Street and resumed the Northside Drive path. By April 1949, US 41 Temp./SR 3E's southbound lanes traveled on Hemphill Avenue. By the middle of 1950, US 41 Temp./SR 3E was shifted off of US 19 on Spring Street and 14th Street, and traveled on Hemphill Avenue again. In 1952, US 41 Temp. was redesignated as part of the US 41 mainline, which was shifted off of SR 3W and onto SR 3E.

=== Chicago toll route ===
Toll U.S. Route 41
- Location: Hammond, Indiana–Wadsworth, Illinois
- Existed: 1958–1966

U.S. Route 41 Toll (US 41 Toll) was the original designation for the Tri-State Tollway, which opened in 1958. The toll route entirely followed the Tri-State Tollway and Kingery Expressway from Hammond, Indiana to Wadsworth, Illinois. By 1966, all U.S. toll routes on the Illinois Tollway system, including US 41 Toll, were removed, leaving I-94 and I-294 behind.

=== Marquette business loop ===
Business US Highway 41
- Location: Marquette, Michigan
- Length: 2.343 mi (3.771 km)
- Existed: November 21, 1963–October 10, 2005

Business US Highway 41 (Bus. 41) was a state trunkline highway that served as a business loop off US 41 in Michigan through the city of Marquette along Washington and Front streets after the construction of an expressway bypass of downtown. Jurisdiction over the two streets was transferred to the city as part of a route swap that resulted in the decommissioning of the trunkline. It was also previously co-designated Bus. M-28, mirroring the Bus. US 41/Bus. M-28 designations along Bus. M-28 in Ishpeming and Negaunee.

=== Ishpeming-Negaunee business loop ===
Business US Highway 41
- Location: Ishpeming–Negaunee, Michigan
- Length: 4.873 mi (7.842 km)
- Existed: 1937–1958

Business U.S. Highway 41 (Bus. US 41) served Ishpeming and Negaunee is the only one of the three former business loops in Michigan that is still a state-maintained highway, although it is no longer designated Bus. US 41. US 41/M-28 was relocated to bypass the two cities' downtowns in 1937. The highway through downtown Ishpeming and Negaunee was redesignated US 41A/M-28A at the time The Michigan State Highway Department later redesignated it Alt. US 41/Alt. M-28. Eventually it carried the Bus. US 41/Bus. M-28 designation before being designated just Bus. M-28 in 1958.

=== Baraga business loop ===
Business US Highway 41
- Location: Baraga, Michigan
- Existed: by April 15, 1940–by June 15, 1942

Business U.S. Highway 41 (Bus. US 41) existed in Baraga in the early 1940s. As shown on the maps of the time, US 41 was relocated in Baraga between the publication of the December 1, 1939, and the April 15, 1940, MSHD maps. A business loop followed the old routing through downtown. The last map that shows the loop was published on July 1, 1941. Bus. US 41 is shown under local control on the June 15, 1942, map.
