= WREF (FM) =

- Sebree, Kentucky; United States
- Broadcast area: Evansville, Indiana
- Frequency: 97.7 MHz
- Branding: ESPN 97.7 The Ref

Programming
- Format: Sports
- Affiliations: ESPN Radio

Ownership
- Owner: Henson Media, Inc.; (Henson Media of Henderson County, LLC)
- Sister stations: WSON, WMSK-FM, WUCO

History
- First air date: April 9, 1976; 50 years ago
- Former call signs: WHRZ (1976–2004); WWKY (2004–2017)

Technical information
- Licensing authority: FCC
- Facility ID: 67479
- Class: A
- ERP: 6,000 watts
- HAAT: 96 meters
- Transmitter coordinates: 37°42′41″N 87°31′43″W

Links
- Public license information: Public file; LMS

WREF (97.7 FM) is a radio station licensed to Sebree, Kentucky, United States, serving Hopkins and Webster counties, as well as the greater Evansville, Indiana, area. The station is owned by Henson Media, Inc.

== History ==
The station's construction permit for a new radio station, originally licensed to Providence, Kentucky, was issued on May 22, 1975. Its first broadcast as WHRZ was in April 1976, with former WOMI general manager Doug Gabby as manager of the station. Under original ownership by Tradewater Broadcasting Company, the station aired an adult contemporary format in its early years as the only radio station within Webster County boundaries. The station became a country music- formatted station in 1983.

In 1991, the station's transmission was relocated near Dixon, Kentucky, with the opening of a second studio/office facility in Madisonville.

The station changed its callsign to WWKY (unrelated to the current WWKY-FM (104.9 MHz) in Providence) on July 14, 2004.

=== Rebirth as an ESPN Radio affiliate ===
On the 27th of March 2017, WWKY went silent. On April 13, 2017, WWKY, under current ownership by Henson Media, changed callsigns to WREF, and relocated its broadcast license location to Sebree, Kentucky, with studios in Henderson. The station resumed broadcasting June 1, 2017 with an ESPN Radio affiliation, branded as ESPN 97.7, The Ref.

== Programming ==
=== Past Programming ===
Rick Stevens was heard on weekdays from 9 until noon.

Howdy-FM covered local news of Madisonville and Hopkins County with Boyce Tate.

WWKY was the sports voice of Webster County High School, the University of Kentucky and the Tennessee Titans.

=== Current Programming ===
WREF now broadcasts ESPN Radio and a local sports talk show called "All About Sports" on weekdays. WREF also broadcasts local high school sporting events along with local collegiate sports.
