= National Register of Historic Places listings in Webster County, Kentucky =

Location of Webster County in Kentucky

This is a list of the National Register of Historic Places listings in Webster County, Kentucky.

It is intended to be a complete list of the properties on the National Register of Historic Places in Webster County, Kentucky, United States. The locations of National Register properties for which the latitude and longitude coordinates are included below, may be seen in a map.

There are 3 properties listed on the National Register in the county.

This National Park Service list is complete through NPS recent listings posted December 12, 2025.

== Current listings ==
	Name on the Register	Image	Date listed	Location	City or town	Description
1	McMullin-Warren House	McMullin-Warren House	March 8, 1988 (#88000185)	301 W. Main St. 37°36′25″N 87°31′24″W	Sebree	
2	Providence Commercial Historic District	Providence Commercial Historic District	March 1, 1993 (#93000042)	100-200 blocks of E. and W. Main and N. and S. Broadway; 37°23′51″N 87°45′47″W	Providence	
3	Webster County Courthouse	Webster County Courthouse	August 8, 1991 (#91000924)	Courthouse Square; 37°31′01″N 87°41′27″W	Dixon	

== See also ==
- List of National Historic Landmarks in Kentucky
- National Register of Historic Places listings in Kentucky
