= Kentucky Route 670 =

State highway in Webster County, Kentucky

Kentucky Route 670
- KY 670 highlighted in red

Route information
- Maintained by KYTC
- Length: 2.712 mi (4.365 km)
- Existed: 1982–present

Major junctions
- West end: KY 109 near Providence
- North end: US 41 Alt. in Providence

Location
- Country: United States
- State: Kentucky
- Counties: Webster

Highway system
- Kentucky State Highway System; Interstate; US; State; Parkways
← KY 669	→ KY 671

Kentucky Route 670 (KY 670) is a 2.712-mile-long (4.365 km) state highway in southern Webster County. It serves as a northern bypass around Providence, connecting KY 109 to U.S. Route 41 Alternate (US 41 Alt.).

== History ==
KY 670 was formed in 1979.

The original KY 670 ran from US 60 near Gregoryville northwest via Smith Branch Road; this was decommissioned between 1970 and 1977.

== Major intersections ==
The entire route is in Webster County.

Location	mi	km	Destinations	Notes
	0.000	0.000	KY 109 – Clay, Sturgis, Dawson Springs	Western terminus
	1.347	2.168	KY 293 south	West end of KY 293 overlap
Providence	2.510	4.039	KY 293 north	East end of KY 293 overlap
Providence	2.712	4.365	US 41 Alt. – Dixon, Madisonville	Eastern terminus
1.000 mi = 1.609 km; 1.000 km = 0.621 mi: Concurrency terminus
