= Kentucky Route 138 =

State highway in Kentucky, United States

Kentucky Route 138
- KY 138 highlighted in red

Route information
- Maintained by KYTC
- Length: 33.434 mi (53.807 km)

Major junctions
- West end: KY 132 near Dixon
- US 41 near Slaughters; I-69 near Slaughters
- East end: US 431 near Livermore

Location
- Country: United States
- State: Kentucky
- Counties: Webster, Hopkins, McLean

Highway system
- Kentucky State Highway System; Interstate; US; State; Parkways
← KY 137	→ KY 139

Kentucky Route 138 (KY 138) is a 33.434-mile-long (53.807 km) state highway in Kentucky. It runs from KY 132 northeast of Dixon to U.S. Route 431 (US 431) south of Livermore via Slaughters.

== Major intersections ==
County	Location	mi	km	Destinations	Notes
Webster		0.000	0.000	KY 132	Western terminus
Webster		6.282	10.110	KY 1835 south	Northern terminus of KY 1835
Webster		8.290	13.341	KY 1835 north	Southern terminus of KY 1835
Webster		9.669	15.561	KY 1405 north / Slaughters Cemetery Road	Southern terminus of KY 1405
Webster	Slaughters	10.439	16.800	KY 120 west (Main Street)	Eastern terminus of KY 120
Hopkins		10.751	17.302	US 41 (Hanson Road)	
Hopkins		11.878– 11.890	19.116– 19.135	I-69 – Madisonville, Henderson	I-69 exit 125
Hopkins		12.095	19.465	KY 1033 south (Vandetta Road)	Northern terminus of KY 1033
Hopkins		17.228	27.726	KY 2347 north (Weldon Road) / Weldon Road	Southern terminus of KY 2347
Hopkins		19.086	30.716	KY 281 south (Island Ford Road)	Northern terminus of KY 281
Hopkins		19.179	30.866	KY 370 north (Onton Road) / River Loop	Southern terminus of KY 370
McLean	Rumsey	24.919	40.103	KY 1155 south	Northern terminus of KY 1155
McLean	Rumsey	25.082	40.366	KY 81 north	West end of KY 81 overlap
McLean	Rumsey	25.157	40.486	KY 81 south	East end of KY 81 overlap
McLean		28.889	46.492	KY 1589 south	Northern terminus of KY 1589
McLean		30.645	49.318	KY 891 south	Northern terminus of KY 891
McLean		33.115	53.293	KY 2110 south (Old Island-Livermore Road)	Northern terminus of KY 2110
McLean		33.434	53.807	US 431	Eastern terminus
1.000 mi = 1.609 km; 1.000 km = 0.621 mi: Concurrency terminus
