= WTTL (AM) =

- Madisonville, Kentucky; United States
- Frequency: 1310 kHz
- Branding: The Light 103.5

Programming
- Format: Contemporary Christian

Ownership
- Owner: Madisonville CBC, Inc.
- Sister stations: WTTL-FM, WREF, WWKY-FM, WPKY-AM

History
- First air date: 1956

Technical information
- Licensing authority: FCC
- Facility ID: 13799
- Class: B
- Power: 1,000 watts (day); 40 watts (night)
- Transmitter coordinates: 37°20′12″N 87°32′41″W
- Translator: 103.5 W278CK (Madisonville)

Links
- Public license information: Public file; LMS
- Website: www.wttlradio.com

WTTL (1310 AM, "103.5 The Light") is a radio station broadcasting a contemporary Christian format. Licensed to Madisonville, Kentucky, United States. The station is currently owned by Madisonville CBC, Inc.

== History ==
The station signed on for the first time in 1956 under ownership of Hopkins County Broadcasting. The station was founded by local businessman Conway Smith in 1956. The station was broadcasting a rock format for many years until it switched to an adult contemporary format around 1982.

The station's programming was simulcast over WTTL-FM (106.9 MHz) for a few years since its September 1992 launch until it became a separate entity WZEZ in 1995 by CMS inc. / WZEZ/WTTL, along with seven other stations, was purchased by Commonwealth Broadcasting Corporation in March 2000

=== Switch to Classic hits and the launch of an FM translator ===
On December 20, 2016, WTTL changed their format from ESPN sports to classic hits, branded as "Classic Hits 103.5," which would also be simulcast on the station's then-newly launched FM translator W278CK (103.5 FM) in Madisonville.

== Previous logo ==
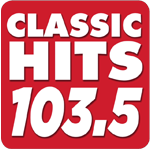
