= WTTL =

WTTL may refer to:

- WTTL (AM), a radio station (1310 AM) licensed to serve Madisonville, Kentucky, United States
- WTTL-FM, a radio station (106.9 FM) licensed to serve Madisonville, Kentucky
