= WMSK =

WMSK can refer to:

- WMSK-FM, a radio station (101.3 FM) licensed to Sturgis, Kentucky, United States
- WUCO, a radio station (1550 AM) licensed to Morganfield, Kentucky, which held the call sign WMSK until 1999 and from 2000 to 2015
