= WKDZ =

WKDZ can refer to:

- WKDZ (AM), a radio station (1110 AM) located in Cadiz, Kentucky, United States
- WKDZ-FM, a radio station (106.5 FM) located in Cadiz, Kentucky, United States
