= Ashland, Kentucky (disambiguation) =

Ashland, Kentucky, usually refers to the present-day city in Boyd County.

It may also refer to:

- Ashland (estate), the home of Henry Clay in Lexington, Kentucky
- Clay, Kentucky, a city in western Kentucky originally known as Ashland
