= Webster County Courthouse =

Webster County Courthouse may refer to:

- Webster County Courthouse (Georgia), Preston, Georgia
- Webster County Courthouse (Iowa), Fort Dodge, Iowa
- Webster County Courthouse (Kentucky), Dixon, Kentucky
- Webster County Courthouse (Mississippi), Walthall, Mississippi, a Mississippi Landmark
- Webster County Courthouse (Nebraska), Red Cloud, Nebraska
