= WZEZ =

WZEZ may refer to:

- WZEZ (FM), a radio station (104.9 FM) licensed to Balsam Lake, Wisconsin, United States
- WJFN-FM, a radio station (100.5 FM) licensed to Goochland, Virginia, United States, which used the call sign WZEZ from 2000 to 2017
- WTTL-FM, a radio station (106.9 FM) licensed to Madisonville, Kentucky, United States, which used the call sign WZEZ from 1995 to 2000
- WIFA (AM), a radio station (1240 AM) licensed to Knoxville, Tennessee, United States, which used the call sign WZEZ from April to September 1994
- WJXA, a radio station (92.9 FM) licensed to Nashville, Tennessee, United States, which used the call sign WZEZ from 1975 to 1994
