= Kentucky Route 132 =

State highway in Kentucky, United States

Kentucky Route 132
- KY 132 highlighted in red

Route information
- Maintained by KYTC
- Length: 30.722 mi (49.442 km)

Major junctions
- South end: KY 120 in rural Crittenden Co
- US 41 Alt. in Dixon
- North end: KY 56 in Sebree

Location
- Country: United States
- State: Kentucky
- Counties: Crittenden, Webster

Highway system
- Kentucky State Highway System; Interstate; US; State; Parkways
← KY 131	→ KY 133

Kentucky Route 132 (KY 132) is a 30.722-mile (49.442 km) long state highway in Kentucky that runs from Kentucky Route 120 northeast of Marion to Kentucky Route 56 in Sebree via Clay and Dixon.

== Major intersections ==
County	Location	mi	km	Destinations	Notes
Crittenden		0.000	0.000	KY 120	Southern terminus
Webster		3.753	6.040	KY 143 north (Oak Grove Church Road)	West end of KY 143 overlap
Webster		5.787	9.313	KY 143 south	East end of KY 143 overlap
Webster		7.568	12.180	KY 493 north	
Webster	Clay	9.598	15.446	KY 109 south (Main Street) / East Elm Street	West end of KY 109 overlap
Webster	Clay	9.794	15.762	KY 109 north	East end of KY 109 overlap
Webster		10.408	16.750	KY 270 east / Kentucky Avenue	West end of KY 270 overlap
Webster		11.008	17.716	KY 270 west	East end of KY 270 overlap
Webster		12.270	19.747	KY 1340 east (Clay-Dixon Road)	Western terminus of KY 1340
Webster		14.548	23.413	KY 857 north	Southern terminus of KY 857
Webster	Dixon	18.621	29.968	US 41 Alt. (Main Street)	
Webster	Dixon	19.204	30.906	KY 2087 north (Clayton Avenue)	Southern terminus of KY 2087
Webster		19.270	31.012	KY 630 south	Northern terminus of KY 630
Webster		20.797	33.470	KY 138 east	Western terminus of KY 138
Webster		22.167	35.674	KY 2839 north (Dixon-Wanamaker Road)	Southern terminus of KY 2839
Webster		23.165	37.280	KY 283 north	Southern terminus of KY 283
Webster		28.109	45.237	KY 494 east	Western terminus of KY 494
Webster	Sebree	30.722	49.442	KY 56 (Main Street) / Watkins Road	Eastern terminus; continues as Watkins Road
1.000 mi = 1.609 km; 1.000 km = 0.621 mi
