= Laban Lacy Rice =

American university president

- Born: October 14, 1870; Dixon, Kentucky, US
- Died: February 13, 1973 (aged 102); Kentucky, US
- Occupations: educator and author
- Spouse: Blanche Alexander Buchanan
- Children: 2

Dr. Laban Lacy Rice (October 14, 1870 – February 13, 1973) was an educator, author, and president of Cumberland University. He was an international authority on relativity.

== Early life ==
He was born in Dixon, Kentucky, to Laban Marchbanks Rice, a Confederate veteran and prominent tobacco merchant, and his wife, Martha Lacy. He was the older brother of the poet Cale Young Rice. Lacy Rice grew up with his family in Evansville, Indiana, and Louisville, Kentucky.

He received his BA, MA, and PhD degrees from Cumberland University. While a student at Cumberland, he was one of five men to found the Theta chapter of Kappa Sigma fraternity on October 7, 1887. Rice married Blanche Alexander Buchanan in Lebanon, Tennessee, and was the father of two daughters, Katherine and Anne. After his retirement, he made his home in Warwick, Virginia.

== Career ==
He served as a professor of English at Cumberland University, as headmaster at Castle Heights Military Academy, and as associate editor of the Cumberland Presbyterian prior to being elected as president of Cumberland University. He also founded a private girls' camp called Camp Nakanawa and was an amateur astronomer. The Rice Observatory on the Cumberland University campus is named after him. In 1902 he along with Edward E. Weir, PhD (who also taught with him at Cumberland University) were on faculty at the Lebanon College for Young Ladies.

His birthplace in Webster County, Kentucky, is designated by Historic Marker #1508, which reads:

Birthplace of Rice brothers, Cale Young, 1872–1943, noted poet and author; Laban Lacy, 1870–1973, well-known educator and author. Lacy published The Best Poetic Works of Cale Young Rice after Cale's death. Included in famous collection is poem, "The Mystic." Cale married Alice Hegan, also a distinguished Kentucky writer. Home overlooks Memorial Garden.

== Death ==
He died in St. Petersburg, Florida, in 1973, at the age of 102, and was buried at the Cedar Grove Cemetery in Lebanon, Tennessee.
