= Kentucky Route 120 =

State highway in Kentucky, United States

Kentucky Route 120
- KY 120 highlighted in red

Route information
- Maintained by KYTC
- Length: 38.523 mi (61.997 km)

Major junctions
- West end: US 60 / KY 91 in Marion
- US 41 Alt. in Providence
- East end: KY 138 / Main Cross Street in Slaughters

Location
- Country: United States
- State: Kentucky
- Counties: Crittenden, Webster

Highway system
- Kentucky State Highway System; Interstate; US; State; Parkways
← US 119	→ KY 121

Kentucky Route 120 (KY 120) is a 38.523-mile-long (61.997 km) state highway in Kentucky. It runs from U.S. Route 60 (US 60) and KY 91 in Marion to KY 138 and Main Cross Street in Slaughters via Providence.

== Major intersections ==
County	Location	mi	km	Destinations	Notes
Crittenden	Marion	0.000	0.000	US 60 (Main Street) / KY 91 north (West Bellville Street) to US 641	Western terminus; southern terminus of KY 91; to US 641 via US 60 westbound
Crittenden		2.628	4.229	KY 1905 north (Wilson Farm Road)	Southern terminus of KY 1905
Crittenden		5.116	8.233	KY 654 north	Southern terminus of KY 654
Crittenden		10.667	17.167	KY 139 south	Northern terminus of KY 139
Crittenden		12.229	19.681	KY 132 east	Western terminus of KY 132
Crittenden		14.812	23.838	KY 1917 south	Northern terminus of KY 1917
Webster		17.231	27.731	KY 1525 north	Southern terminus of KY 1525
Webster	Providence	21.425	34.480	KY 109 / KY 293 south (Broadway Street)	West end of KY 293 overlap
Webster	Providence	21.849	35.163	KY 293 north (North Finley Avenue)	Southern terminus of KY 293
Webster	Providence	23.312	37.517	US 41 Alt.	
Webster		27.783	44.712	KY 2836 west (Jolly Liberty Road) / Picas Austin Road	Eastern terminus of KY 2836
Webster		31.354	50.459	KY 630 north	West end of KY 630 overlap
Webster		31.687	50.995	KY 630 south	East end of KY 630 overlap
Webster		35.046	56.401	KY 1069 south / Old Dixon-Slaughters Road	Northern terminus of KY 1069
Webster	Slaughters	38.523	61.997	KY 138 (Main Cross Street / Main Street) / Main Cross Street	Eastern terminus
1.000 mi = 1.609 km; 1.000 km = 0.621 mi: Concurrency terminus
