= Poole, Kentucky =

Census-designated place in Kentucky, United States

- Census-designated place
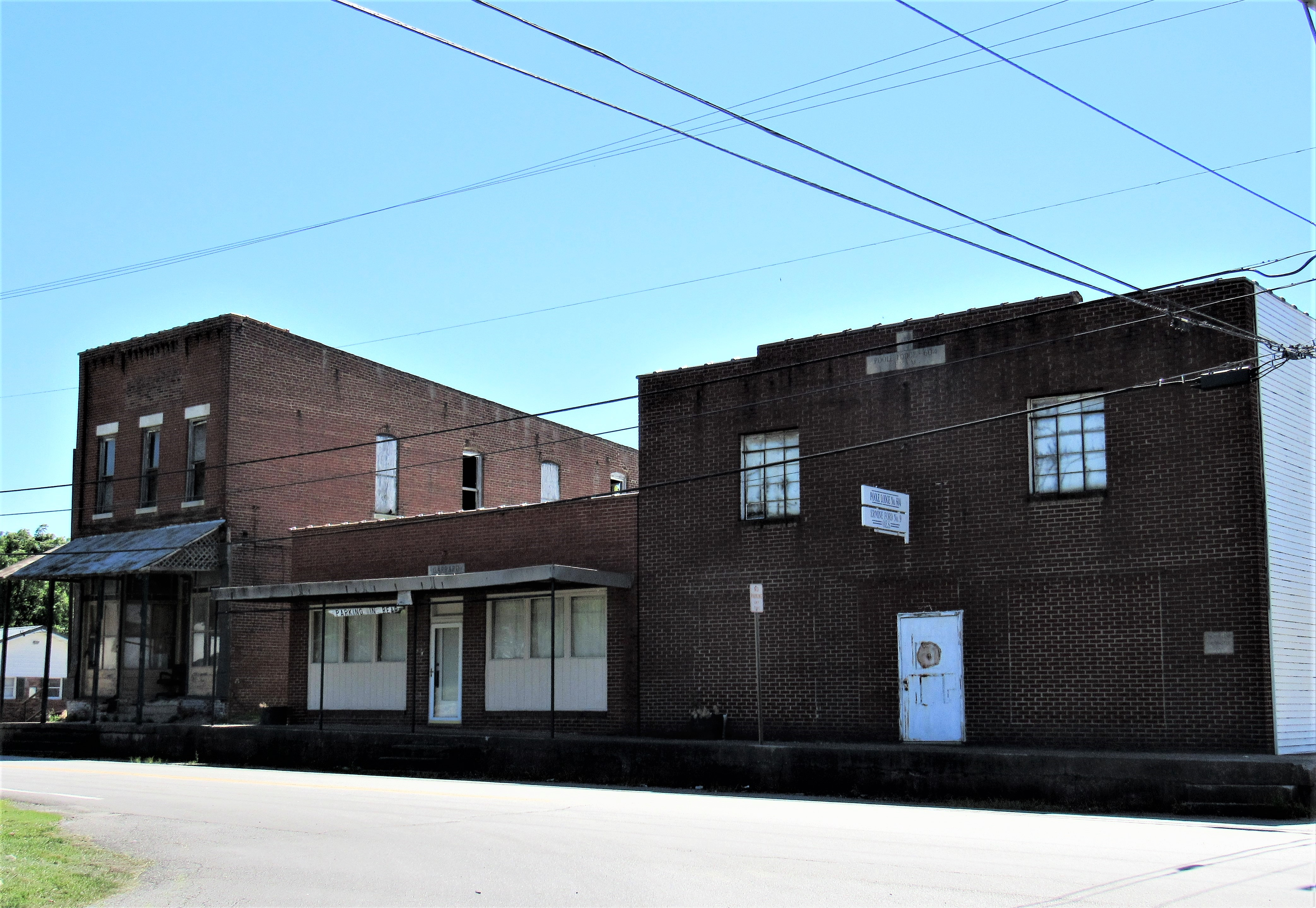

- Location within Kentucky Location within the United States
- Coordinates: 37°38′25″N 87°38′39″W
- Country: United States
- State: Kentucky
- Counties: Webster, Henderson

Area
  - Total: 0.98 sq mi (2.54 km^{2})
  - Land: 0.97 sq mi (2.51 km^{2})
  - Water: 0.012 sq mi (0.03 km^{2})
- Elevation: 498 ft (152 m)

Population (2020)
  - Total: 354
  - Density: 364.9/sq mi (140.87/km^{2})
- Time zone: UTC-6 (Central (CST))
  - Summer (DST): UTC-5 (CST)
- ZIP code: 42444
- FIPS code: 21-62202
- GNIS feature ID: 501069

Poole is an unincorporated community and census-designated place (CDP) in Webster and Henderson counties, Kentucky, United States. As of the 2020 census, Poole had a population of 354. The community is on U.S. Route 41A, 15 miles (24 km) south of Henderson and 20 miles (32 km) north of Providence. The center of Poole is in northern Webster County, and the community extends north into southern Henderson County.

== Demographics ==
Historical population
Census	Pop.	Note	%±
2020	354		—
U.S. Decennial Census
