= Kentucky Route 281 =

State highway in Kentucky, United States

Kentucky Route 281
- KY 281 highlighted in red

Route information
- Maintained by KYTC
- Length: 16.2 mi (26.1 km)

Major junctions
- South end: US 41 / US 41 in Madisonville
- I-69 in Madisonville; KY 862 northeast of Madisonville; KY 260 east of Hanson
- North end: KY 138 in Jewell City

Location
- Country: United States
- State: Kentucky
- Counties: Hopkins

Highway system
- Kentucky State Highway System; Interstate; US; State; Parkways
← KY 277	→ KY 282

Kentucky Route 281 (KY 281) is a 16.2-mile-long (26.1 km) state highway in the U.S. state of Kentucky. The highway connects mostly rural areas of Hopkins County with Madisonville.

== Route description ==
KY 281 begins at an intersection with U.S. Route 41 (US 41; North Main Street) in Madisonville, within Hopkins, where the roadway continues as US 41 Alt. (Nebo Road). It travels to the northeast and crosses over some CSX railroad tracks. Then, it has an interchange with Interstate 69 (I-69) and then curves to the north-northeast. Right after it leaves the city limits of Madisonville, it intersects the western terminus of KY 2281 (Carriage Lane). The highway crosses over Elk Creek and intersects the western terminus of KY 2338 (Carroll Gentry Road). It then intersects KY 862 (Charles Lenin Road). Just east of Hanson, it intersects KY 260 (Eastlawn Road). Just north of this intersection, it passes West Lawn and East Lawn cemeteries. The highway curves to the north-northwest and then back to the northeast. In Vandetta, it intersects the southern terminus of KY 1033 (Vandetta Road). It crosses over Otter Creek and then enters Jewell City, where it meets its northern terminus, an intersection with KY 138 (Jewell City Road).

== Major intersections ==
The entire route is in Hopkins County.

Location	mi	km	Destinations	Notes
Madisonville	0.0	0.0	US 41 (North Main Street) / US 41 Alt. north (Nebo Road) – Earlington, Sebree, Providence	Southern terminus of KY 281 and US 41 Alt.
Madisonville	0.6	0.97	Future I-69 / Pennyrile Parkway – Nortonville, Henderson	Pennyrile Parkway exit 44
	1.8	2.9	KY 2281 east (Carriage Lane)	Western terminus of KY 2281
	2.6	4.2	KY 2338 east (Carroll Gentry Road)	Western terminus of KY 2338
	3.9	6.3	KY 862 (Charles Lenin Road)	
	5.6	9.0	KY 260 (Eastlawn Road)	
Vandetta	9.1	14.6	KY 1033 north (Vandetta Road)	Southern terminus of KY 1033
Jewell City	16.2	26.1	KY 138 (Jewell City Road)	Northern terminus
1.000 mi = 1.609 km; 1.000 km = 0.621 mi
