= Blackford, Kentucky =

Unincorporated community in Kentucky, United States

Blackford
- Unincorporated community
- Location within the state of Kentucky Blackford (the United States)
- Coordinates: 37°26′54″N 87°56′5″W
- Country: United States
- State: Kentucky
- County: Webster
- Elevation: 364 ft (111 m)
- Time zone: UTC-6 (Central (CST))
  - Summer (DST): UTC-5 (CST)
- ZIP codes: 42403
- GNIS feature ID: 487410

Blackford is an unincorporated community in Webster County, Kentucky, United States.

A post office named Blackford opened in 1887.
