= Cale Young Rice =

American writer (1872–1943)

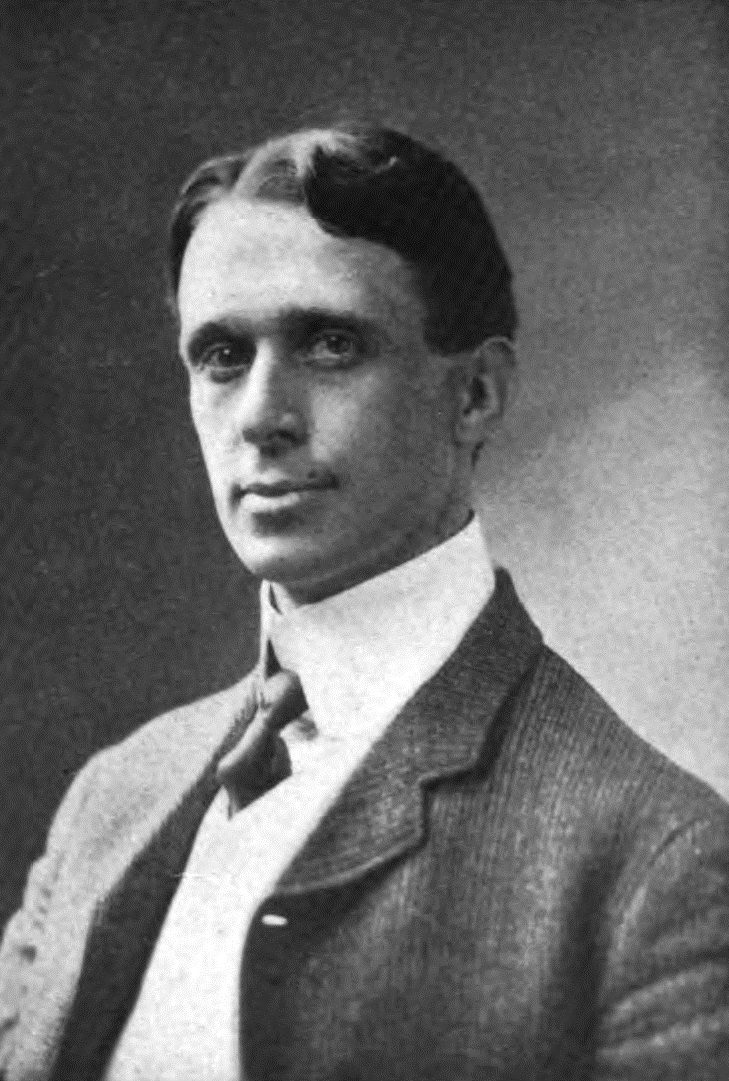
- Portrait of Cale Young Rice
- Born: December 7, 1872; Dixon, Kentucky, US
- Died: January 24, 1943 (aged 70); Louisville, Kentucky, US
- Occupations: poet and dramatist
- Spouse: Alice Hegan Rice

Cale Young Rice (December 7, 1872 – January 24, 1943) was an American poet and dramatist. He was professor of English at Cumberland College. His opera, Yolanda of Cyprus, was widely received.

== Life and career ==
Rice was born in Dixon, Kentucky, to Laban Marchbanks Rice, a Confederate veteran and tobacco merchant, and his wife Martha Lacy. He was a younger brother of Laban Lacy Rice, a noted educator, author, and president of Cumberland College. Cale Rice grew up in Evansville, Indiana, and Louisville, Kentucky. He was educated at Cumberland University where he was a member of the Theta chapter of Kappa Sigma fraternity and at Harvard (A.B., 1895; A.M., 1896).

On December 18, 1902, Rice was married to the popular author Alice Hegan Rice; they worked together on several books. The marriage was childless. In 1910, they built a house at 1444 St. James Court, where they lived for 40 years.

Cale Rice's poems were collected and published in a single volume, The Best Poetic Work of Cale Young Rice, by his brother, Laban Lacy Rice (1870–1973).

His birthplace in Dixon is designated by Kentucky State Historical Marker 1508, which reads:

Birthplace of Rice brothers, Cale Young, 1872–1943, noted poet and author; Laban Lacy, 1870–1973, well-known educator and author. Lacy published The Best Poetic Works of Cale Young Rice after Cale's death. Included in famous collection is poem, "The Mystic." Cale married Alice Hegan, also a distinguished Kentucky writer. Home overlooks Memorial Garden.

Rice adapted his play Yolanda of Cyprus into an opera libretto for Clarence Loomis; the resulting work was premiered on September 25, 1929, in London, Ontario, under the baton of Isaac Van Grove, and featured Charles Kullman. The production was directed by Vladimir Rosing. The opera later received the Bispham Memorial Medal Award.

== Death ==
Rice committed suicide by gunshot during the night of January 24, 1943, at his home in Louisville a year after his wife's death, because of his sorrow at losing her.

== Works ==
=== Poetry ===
- From Dusk to Dusk (1898)
- With Omar (1900)
- Song Surf (1900)
- Nirvana Days (1908)
- Many Gods (1910)
- At the World's Heart (1914)

=== Plays ===
- Charles di Tocca (1903)
- Yolanda of Cyprus (1906)
- A Night in Avignon (1907)
- The Immortal Lure (1911)
- Porzia (1913)

=== Collection ===
- Collected Plays and Poems (two volumes, 1915)

=== Other works ===
- Youth's Way. New York, The Century Co., 1923.
- A New Approach to Philosophy. Lebanon, Tenn: The Cumberland University Press, 1943.
