= WKDZ-FM =

Coordinates: 36.808°N 87.636°W

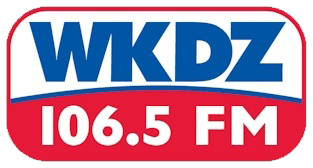
- Cadiz, Kentucky; United States
- Broadcast area: Clarksville–Hopkinsville
- Frequency: 106.5 MHz
- Branding: 106.5 FM WKDZ

Programming
- Format: Country
- Affiliations: Fox News Radio; United Stations Radio Networks; Tennessee Titans Radio Network; UK Sports Network

Ownership
- Owner: Ham Broadcasting, Inc.
- Sister stations: WEKT, WHVO, WKDZ-AM, WPKY

History
- First air date: May 18, 1972
- Former call signs: WBZD (1986–1991)
- Former frequencies: 106.3 MHz (1972–2001)
- Call sign meaning: KDZ = "Cadiz"

Technical information
- Licensing authority: FCC
- Facility ID: 25886
- Class: C3
- ERP: 13,400 watts
- HAAT: 136.9 meters (449 ft)

Links
- Public license information: Public file; LMS
- Webcast: Listen live
- Website: WKDZradio.com

WKDZ-FM (106.5 MHz) is a radio station licensed in Cadiz, Kentucky. WKDZ-FM is owned by Ham Broadcasting. Beth Mann serves as Ham Broadcasting owner/president.

The station's studios are located in a 4,100-square-foot (380 m^{2}) facility at Broadbent Square along US 68/KY 80 in east Cadiz near the Interstate 24 interchange. The station's transmitter is located on Bailey Road off Kentucky Route 117 near its junction with Interstate 24 in southwestern Christian County.

== History ==
The station first signed on the air at 106.3 megahertz on May 18, 1972. It began as a 3,000-watt FM simulcast station of WKDZ-AM for its first 24 years on the air. At that time, WKDZ-AM broadcast a Variety format.

In 1986, the station became separate from the AM counterpart, and began broadcasting an Adult contemporary format under the WBZD callsign. Sometime later in that decade, it changed to an easy listening format. In 1991, when current owner Ham Broadcasting purchased the station and its AM counterpart, the FM station's callsign was reverted to the original WKDZ-FM callsign it held as a repeater of the AM station, and it began broadcasting a country format, which remains with the station today.

=== Change of frequency and studio relocation ===
The station switched frequencies to its current 106.5 MHz on August 23, 2001. In May 2004, Ham Broadcasting relocated the studio from its pre-existing Will Jackson Road facility to its current location near U.S. Route 68's junction with Interstate 24. The state-of-the-art studio facility, a former Hardee's restaurant building, was remodeled to house WKDZ-FM and its AM counterpart, as well as the home of WHVO's technical operations. The previous studio now serves as a backup studio and maintenance facility.

== Programming ==
=== Format and coverage area ===
WKDZ-FM broadcasts a country music format and its primary coverage area, as part of the Clarksville-Hopkinsville radio market, consists of Trigg, Christian, Caldwell, Lyon, and Todd counties in Kentucky, along with nearby Montgomery and Stewart counties in Middle Tennessee. However, it's 100,000 watt signal allows the station to be heard in many areas between Paducah's eastern outskirts and Nashville's northwestern outskirts, including the easternmost counties of Kentucky's Jackson Purchase region in the west, the southern part of the Western Coal Fields region in the north, much of Logan County in the east, as well as other areas of northwestern Middle Tennessee to the south.

=== Sports programming ===
In addition to its usual music programming, WKDZ-FM is an affiliate of the Tennessee Titans Radio Network, which broadcasts live games involving the NFL's Tennessee Titans based in Nashville. WKDZ-FM also serves as one of three affiliates of the University of Kentucky Wildcats radio network in the Clarksville-Hopkinsville market (the other two are WHOP-AM and WHOP-FM), broadcasting games of their football and men's and women's basketball programs. WKDZ-FM also broadcasts Trigg County High School football games on Friday nights from mid-August through November and Trigg County High School basketball games (boys and girls) from November to March.

On August 1, 2017, the station launched YourSportsEdge.com, a sports website dedicated to covering sports at Trigg County High School, Caldwell County High School, Lyon County High School, Hopkinsville High School, Christian County High School, Heritage Christian Academy, University Heights Academy, Fort Campbell High School, and Todd County Central High School. In addition, the site covers college sports and the Hoptown Hoppers Ohio Valley League baseball team.

=== News operation ===
WKDZ-FM is unique in that it, along with sister stations WHVO and WKDZ-AM, boasts a full-time news department in house. The one-hour newscasts, branded as News Edge, are broadcast at 12 Noon and 5:00 p.m. Central Time over all three Ham Broadcasting-owned stations. Shorter newscasts are run at 6, 7, and 8 a.m. CT. Hourly national news updates are provided by Fox News Radio at the top of each hour.

== Awards and recognitions ==
WKDZ-FM has been recognized many times for its community service. The station also has won a Marconi Award for "Small Market Station Of The Year" in 2002, 2008, 2013, and 2017. WKDZ-FM has also been consistently nominated for the coveted NAB Crystal Award for Community Service, which they won in 2013.
