= WEKT =

- Elkton, Kentucky; United States
- Frequency: 1070 kHz
- Branding: Todd 1070 & 92.1 WEKT

Programming
- Format: Classic hits

Ownership
- Owner: Edge Media Group; (Ham Broadcasting Company, Inc.)
- Sister stations: WKDZ, WKDZ-FM, WHVO

History
- First air date: July 21, 1977
- Former call signs: WOAM (1988–1989)
- Call sign meaning: Elkton

Technical information
- Licensing authority: FCC
- Facility ID: 39460
- Class: D
- Power: 500 watts (day); 18 watts (night)
- Transmitter coordinates: 36°48′33″N 87°09′38″W
- Translator: 92.1 W221EU (Elkton)

Links
- Public license information: Public file; LMS
- Webcast: Listen live
- Website: wektradio.com

WEKT (1070 AM) is a radio station broadcasting a classic hits format. Licensed to and located in Elkton, Kentucky, United States, the station is currently owned by the Cadiz, Kentucky-based Edge Media Group, a unit of Ham Broadcasting Company, Inc.

The station's studio is located on the Public Square (junction of US 68 Business and KY 181) in downtown Elkton, and its transmission facility is located on Marion Street on the west side of Elkton.

The station's FM translator, W221EU (92.1 FM), broadcasts from a transmitter along Williams Hill Road off US 68/KY 80 just east of Elkton.

== History ==
=== Early years ===
The station signed on the air as WSRG on July 21, 1977, initially broadcasting a country music format under ownership of Jim White. It became known as WOAM on February 1, 1988, when country music singer and longtime Grand Ole Opry member Ernie Ashworth purchased the station. In September of that year, Ashworth placed the station on the auction block in order for him to purchase WSLV of Ardmore, Alabama. After the station was purchased by Marshall and Ruby Sidebottom, with the business name M&R Broadcasting, shortly after they sold WIRV of Irvine, WOAM officially became WEKT on January 3, 1989; the sale was finalized the following month.

=== The southern gospel years ===
The station switched to a Southern Gospel format at some time in 1990; some local music acts of that genre were featured at various times on the station throughout the 1990s decade.

On March 24, 2016, WEKT was granted an FCC construction permit to increase daytime power to 1,000 watts.

=== Sale to Edge Media Group ===
On June 16, 2023, it was announced that M&R Broadcasting was intending to sell WEKT to Ham Broadcasting Company, Incorporated (also known as the Edge Media Group), the owners of WHVO in nearby Hopkinsville and three other radio stations in the region. The sale was finalized later that month. On July 1, 2023, the station began broadcasting their current Classic hits format, but retained their Sunday schedule of church worship programming from their previous format until some time during the following year. Starting with the 2023–24 academic year, the station also began offering programming produced by students of Todd County Schools as part of the district's multimedia cirriculum.

On April 12, 2024, WEKT launched a low-power translator to simulcast its AM programming at 92.1 megahertz. WEKT was previously one of a few remaining AM radio stations in western Kentucky without an FM companion until that day. The translator, as W218CR, was purchased by Ham Broadcasting from Hope Media Group in 2023. The translator's callsign was changed to W221EU before it began Elkton operations as the FM companion of WEKT.

== Programming ==
In addition to classic hit music, the station also broadcasts church services on Sundays. It is also the home of football and basketball games of the Todd County Central High School athletic teams. Since 2001, the station also serves as a part-time affiliate of the Hilltopper Sports Network, broadcasting games of the Western Kentucky Hilltoppers football team.

=== Past programming ===
From 2000 until around the mid-2010s, WEKT previously served as the Todd County radio home of the NFL's Tennessee Titans football games through the Titans Radio Network. Salem News Network provided national news updates when the station aired its southern gospel format.

=== News operation ===
Since 2023, WEKT boasts its own news department as part of the expansion of the NewsEdge branding used by Edge Media's other radio stations. Hour-long newscasts are aired on weekdays at 12 noon and 5 p.m. The station also airs 15-minute newscasts on Saturdays and Sundays at 8 a.m., 12 noon and 5 p.m. Hourly national news updates are provided by Fox News Radio.
