= Webster County School District (Kentucky) =

School district in Kentucky, United States

Address
- 28 State Route 1340 Dixon, Kentucky, 42409; United States

District information
- Type: Public
- Grades: PreK–12
- NCES District ID: 2105820

Students and staff
- Students: 2,183
- Teachers: 128.0
- Staff: 208.0
- Student–teacher ratio: 17.05

Other information
- Website: www.webster.kyschools.us

Webster County School District is the school district serving Webster County, Kentucky. Its headquarters are in Dixon.

The Providence Independent Schools district was scheduled to merge into the Webster County district in July 2007. Providence school authorities approached the Webster County authorities and proposed a merger due to various problems in their district; the Webster district authorities agreed, even though they initially were not sure if their schools had enough space for extra students and had concerns about possible declines in academic performance and financial capabilities, because the Kentucky Department of Education funded the construction of new county school buildings.

== Schools ==
Secondary:

- Webster County High School (Dixon)
- Webster County Middle School

Primary:

- Clay Elementary School (Clay)
- Dixon Elementary School (Dixon)
- Providence Elementary School (Providence)
- Sebree Elementary School (Sebree)

Other:

- Webster County Area Technology Center (ATC) (Dixon)
- Webster County Alternative Learning Center a.k.a. Webster County Academy (Dixon)
