= Little Zion, Kentucky =

Unincorporated community in Kentucky, United States

Little Zion
- Unincorporated community
- Location within the state of Kentucky Little Zion (the United States)
- Coordinates: 37°32′40″N 87°43′24″W
- Country: United States
- State: Kentucky
- County: Webster
- Elevation: 427 ft (130 m)
- Time zone: UTC-6 (Central (CST))
  - Summer (DST): UTC-5 (CST)
- GNIS feature ID: 508479

Little Zion is an unincorporated community in Webster County, Kentucky, United States. It was also known as Luzon.
