= Providence Independent Schools =

Former school district in Kentucky, US

Providence Independent Schools was a school district headquartered in Providence, Kentucky.

It operated Broadway Elementary and Providence High School.

Prior to 2007 the district, while remaining afloat financially, had the lowest Commonwealth Accountability Testing System (CATS) scores in Kentucky, enrollment had declined to 400 for all grade levels, and the local authorities declared the high school building condemned; these factors prompted district authorities to seek a merger with the Webster County School District. The Webster district authorities agreed, even though they initially were not sure if their schools had enough space for extra students and had concerns about possible declines in academic performance and financial capabilities, because the Kentucky Department of Education funded the construction of new county school buildings. The Providence school system was scheduled to merge into the Webster county district in July 2007. Its territory is now within the Webster County School District.
