= Clarence Loomis =

American pianist and composer (1889–1965)

- Born: December 13, 1889; Sioux Falls, South Dakota
- Died: July 3, 1965 (aged 75)
- Genres: Opera
- Occupations: Composer, pianist, and teacher
- Instrument: Piano

Clarence Loomis (December 13, 1889 – July 3, 1965), an American composer, pianist, and teacher, was born in Sioux Falls, South Dakota.

== Biography ==
He studied piano and composition at the American Conservatory in Chicago and also privately in Vienna. Loomis taught at Butler University in Indianapolis, at Highlands University in Las Vegas, New Mexico, and at the American Conservatory in Chicago. He composed 11 operas, numerous choral works, ballets, tone poems, oratorios and other works. His compositions include Alabado Sea, an oratorio, Revival, a radio opera, Oak Street Beach, a ballet, and Macbeth, a symphonic tone poem. Loomis spent the last five years of his life in Aptos, California, near Santa Cruz.

== Operas ==
Loomis's operas include A Night in Avignon, based on the life of the Italian lyric poet Petrarch, Dun an Oir (Castle of Gold), based on Gaelic folklore, The Fall of the House of Usher, based on the tale by Edgar Allan Poe, David, a biblical opera, and Yolanda of Cyprus.

Yolanda of Cyprus was premiered in 1929 by Vladimir Rosing's American Opera Company and performed in 14 cities in the United States and Canada. The opera was the winner of the David Bispham Medal awarded to American opera composers of note. The libretto for Yolanda of Cyprus was by writer Cale Young Rice, who also collaborated with Loomis on other projects. Sets were designed by Robert Edmond Jones. The opera got mixed reviews. At its American premiere in Chicago, Herman Devries of the Evening American called the opera “a monument in American music,” proclaiming it “the one and only American opera of our generation." Others characterized the score as a pale imitation of Debussy and Wagner and the libretto passed over as " conventional."

== The Flapper and the Quarterback ==
During the 1920s, the dancer Ruth Page (ballerina) commissioned Loomis to write a distinctively new kind of American ballet for her international tour. The Flapper and the Quarterback toured Asia and Russia with Page's company, and was a featured part of the festivities surrounding the coronation of Japan's Emperor Hirohito in 1928. The choreography was influenced broadly by the popular dance styles of the Jazz Age.

== Susanna Don't You Cry ==
Loomis was commissioned to write a musical based on the life of American songwriter Stephen Foster. Susanna Don't You Cry was produced in New York at the Martin Beck Theater in 1939.

== Relation to Abraham Lincoln ==
Clarence Loomis was related by marriage through his father's first cousin to President Abraham Lincoln.
