= Stanhope, Kentucky =

Unincorporated community in Kentucky, United States

Stanhope
- Unincorporated community
- Location within the state of Kentucky Stanhope (the United States)
- Coordinates: 37°26′42″N 87°40′7″W
- Country: United States
- State: Kentucky
- County: Webster
- Elevation: 463 ft (141 m)
- Time zone: UTC-6 (Central (CST))
  - Summer (DST): UTC-5 (CST)
- GNIS feature ID: 504256

Stanhope is an unincorporated community in Webster County, Kentucky, United States. It was also known as Liberty.
