= WHVO =

Radio station in Hopkinsville, Kentucky

WHVO and WKDZ

WHVO: Hopkinsville, Kentucky; WKDZ: Cadiz, Kentucky
- Broadcast area: Clarksville, Tennessee–Hopkinsville, Kentucky
- Frequencies: WHVO: 1480 kHz; WKDZ: 1110 kHz
- Branding: Oldies Radio 96.5 & 100.9 FM

Programming
- Format: Oldies
- Affiliations: Fox News Radio; Premiere Networks; United Stations Radio Networks

Ownership
- Owner: Ham Broadcasting Co., Inc.
- Sister stations: WEKT, WKDZ-FM, WPKY

History
- First air date: WHVO: September 19, 1954; WKDZ: April 8, 1966
- Former call signs: WHVO: WKOA (1954–1986); WYKH (1986–1987); WQKS (1987–2000)
- Call sign meaning: WHVO: "Hopkinsville Oldies"; WKDZ: "Cadiz"

Technical information
- Licensing authority: FCC
- Facility ID: WHVO: 55651; WKDZ: 25887
- Class: WHVO: D; WKDZ: D
- Power: WHVO: 1,000 watts (day); 24 watts (night); WKDZ: 790 watts (day)
- Transmitter coordinates: WHVO: 36°52′15″N 87°30′43″W; WKDZ: 36°52′57″N 87°50′44″W
- Translator(s): WHVO: 96.5 W243CH (Hopkinsville); WKDZ: 100.9 W265BW (Cadiz)

Links
- Public license information: WHVO: Public file; LMS; WKDZ: Public file; LMS
- Webcast: Listen Live
- Website: www.whvoradio.com

WHVO (1480 AM) and WKDZ (1110 AM) are a pair of radio stations simulcasting an oldies format. Licensed to Hopkinsville, Kentucky, United States, WHVO serves the Clarksville-Hopkinsville area. WKDZ is licensed to Cadiz, Kentucky. The stations are currently owned by Ham Broadcasting Co., Inc. and feature news programming from Fox News Radio. WKDZ is a daytime-only radio station, while WHVO broadcasts 24 hours a day.

The two stations maintain a shared studio facility with WKDZ-FM on US 68/KY 80 near its junction with Interstate 24 in Cadiz. WHVO's transmitter is located near the Western Kentucky State Fairgrounds in Hopkinsville. WKDZ's transmitter is located on Monitor Springs Road off KY 778 near Cadiz.

== History ==
=== History of WHVO ===
The station, built by the Woods family, who were also the owners of the Kentucky New Era, the Woods family, was assigned the call letters WKOA upon signing on the air on September 19, 1954, under the license of Pennyrile Broadcasting Company, the broadcast division of the New Era. Local businessman William Higgins purchased the station in 1958. It was a middle-of-the-road (MOR format) in the 1970s, and then a big band/oldies format during the mid-1980s. The station's callsigns changed to WYKH on April 1, 1986, when it switched to a solid gold oldies format after being purchased by John N. Hall III. On December 14, 1987, the station changed its call sign to WQKS.

WQKS was acquired by the station's current owner, Ham Broadcasting, in October 1995. The station had changed to its current oldies format in October 1997 after a few years of airing an urban contemporary format. The current WHVO callsign was adopted on May 16, 2000.

=== History of WKDZ (AM) ===
WKDZ (AM) signed on the air on April 8, 1966, under license by Lake Barkley Broadcasting Company. at approximately 11 a.m., with general manager Wilburn "Willie" Wilson, a former WPKY employee, providing the opening remarks. WKDZ signed on the air with the performance of "The Star-Spangled Banner" by the Trigg County High School band. The first song played on WKDZ was "These Boots Are Made for Walkin'" by Nancy Sinatra.

The station signed on and began simulcasting over its FM companion at 106.3 MHz in 1972. WKDZ-AM-FM remained under ownership of the Wilson family until 1986, when local businessman Gary Kidd acquired the station. The FM station became a separate outlet when that station became rock station WBZD. On January 22, 1991, its current owner, Ham Broadcasting, acquired WKDZ-AM and WBDZ (which reverted to WKDZ-FM on March 8, 1991).

WKDZ was the longtime broadcaster of the Cadiz Rotary Auction for many years since 1967.

=== WHVO/WKDZ merger ===
In 2007, WKDZ ceased broadcasting as a separate station, ending the news/talk format on that station. The station began simulcasting WHVO's programming, however, WKDZ would still air separate sports broadcasts, depending on scheduling of high school and/or college sporting

=== Recent history ===
In the early 2010s, Ham Broadcasting signed on two low-powered translators for the purpose of simulcasting WHVO and WKDZ's programming onto the FM dial.

Broadcast translator for WHVO
Call sign	Frequency	City of license	FID	ERP (W)	HAAT	Class	FCC info
W243CH	96.5 FM	Hopkinsville, Kentucky	21839	250	59.9 m (197 ft)	D	LMS

Broadcast translator for WKDZ
Call sign	Frequency	City of license	FID	ERP (W)	HAAT	Class	FCC info
W265BW	100.9 FM	Cadiz, Kentucky	145580	250	100.4 m (329 ft)	D	LMS

== Programming ==
=== Sports programming ===
In addition to its usual oldies music, WHVO and WKDZ-AM are the official broadcasters of the Fort Campbell High School Falcons football team.

The only times that WKDZ-AM and W265BW does not simulcast WHVO's programming is when it, alone, also serves as a UK Sports Network affiliate broadcasting Kentucky Wildcats women's basketball alone, but also simulcasts football and men's basketball broadcasts with WKDZ-FM. WHOP (AM 1230) is the other UK Sports Network station that broadcasts all three kinds of UK Sports Network broadcasts in the Clarksville/Hopkinsville area. WKDZ-AM also solos when broadcasting Trigg County High School basketball games.

=== Station programming schedule ===
- Hoptown This Morning – weekdays 6-9 a.m.
- Mid-Days with Tony Winfield – weekdays 9 a.m.-12 Noon and 1-3 p.m.
- Live Afternoon Drive with Kim Allen – weekdays 3-5 p.m.
- Original Rock 'n Roll with Tom Rogers – weeknights after 6 p.m. Features rock and roll hits that were first heard on the station (as WKOA) when they were first played.

=== News operation ===
WHVO/WKDZ, along with WKDZ-FM, boasts their own news operation. The one-hour newscasts, branded as News Edge, are broadcast at 12 Noon and 5:00 p.m. Central Time, and are simulcast over WHVO and WKDZ-AM-FM. Hourly national news updates on WHVO/WKDZ are provided by Fox News Radio, and are aired at the top of each hour.
