= WTTL-FM =

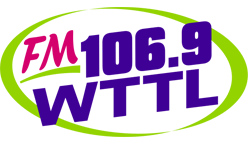
- Madisonville, Kentucky; United States
- Frequency: 106.9 MHz
- Branding: FM 106.9 WTTL

Programming
- Format: Adult contemporary

Ownership
- Owner: Commonwealth Broadcasting Corporation; (Madisonville CBC, Inc.)
- Sister stations: WWKY-FM, WTTL, WREF

History
- First air date: September 1992; 33 years ago
- Former call signs: WTTL-FM (1991–1995); WZEZ (1995–2000); WYMV (2000–2011)

Technical information
- Licensing authority: FCC
- Facility ID: 13800
- Class: A
- ERP: 2,350 watts
- HAAT: 161 meters (529 feet)
- Transmitter coordinates: 37°22′51″N 87°28′04″W

Links
- Public license information: Public file; LMS
- Webcast: Listen live
- Website: wttlradio.com

WTTL-FM (106.9 FM) is a radio station licensed to serve Madisonville, Kentucky, United States. The station is licensed to Madisonville CBC, Inc. and owned by Commonwealth Broadcasting Corporation. It airs an adult contemporary format.

The station has been assigned these call letters by the Federal Communications Commission since December 26, 2011.

== Shows & Personalities ==
Coffee with Craig 6am-noon weekdays

Boyce Tate provides local news, weekdays 6-9 AM, 12 Noon, and at 5 PM.

WTTL-FM is the sports voice of Hopkins County Central High School.
