= WSON =

Henderson, Kentucky; United States
- Broadcast area: Evansville, Indiana
- Frequency: 860 kHz
- Branding: 860-AM & 96.5-FM, WSON

Programming
- Format: Classic hits
- Affiliations: NBC News Radio; Tennessee Titans Radio Network; Westwood One

Ownership
- Owner: Henson Media/Ed Henson; (Henson Media of Henderson County)

History
- First air date: December 17, 1941
- Call sign meaning: Henderson

Technical information
- Licensing authority: FCC
- Facility ID: 26946
- Class: B
- Power: 500 watts
- Transmitter coordinates: 37°51′11″N 87°32′12″W
- Translators: 96.5 W243CU (Sebree); 107.9 W300ED (Henderson)

Links
- Public license information: Public file; LMS
- Webcast: Listen live
- Website: wsonradio.com

WSON (860 AM) is a radio station in Henderson, Kentucky broadcasting a classic hits format. The station is currently owned by Henson Media and features news, sports, weather and music features programming from NBC News Radio and Westwood One, as well as locally produced programming. The station can be heard during daylight hours in neighboring Evansville, Indiana and Owensboro, Kentucky.

== History ==
The station's construction permit was issued by the FCC to Paducah Broadcasters, Inc., the station's first owner, in June 1941. On December 17, 1941, ten days after the attack on Pearl Harbor, WSON first signed on the air under direction by Henderson businessman Hecht Lackey, who previously launched and managed WPAD in Paducah and WHOP in Hopkinsville. The station originally broadcast from studios on Zion Road. For most of its first four decades on the air, WSON was a 250 watt daytime-only station, signing off at sunset in order to protect Radio-Canada flagship station CJBC in Toronto, Ontario, Canada. However, a treaty between the United States and Canada signed in the mid-1980s allowed WSON and other daytimers that went off the air to protect Canadian clear-channel stations, to begin nighttime operations as well. WSON must use a directional antenna from sunset to sunrise, with the signal oriented to the southwest; this protects the skywave signal of CJBC as 860 AM is a Canadian clear-channel frequency.

In 1943, the station was sold to Henderson Broadcasting Co., Inc. The next year, the station affiliated with the Mutual Broadcasting System (MBS) and doubled its transmitter power to 500 watts. In 1947, the station's FM companion station was launched as WSON-FM (now WKDQ); it began simulcasting its AM programming until sometime in 1971, at which point the FM station became a separate entity.

The station relocated to new studios on North Main Street in 1955; the station would return to its original facility in 1967. The following year, the station disaffiliated with MBS to become independent once again. The station picked up an affiliation with ABC Radio in 1961, but switched to CBS Radio two years afterwards.

WSON would eventually become affiliated with NBC Radio.

=== Recent developments ===
In July 2010, owner Henry Lackey, the son of station founder Hecht Lackey, announced that he had agreed to sell WSON to Ed Henson, which owns WMSK-AM-FM in Morganfield and Sturgis, Kentucky. The deal received FCC approval and was consummated soon thereafter.

In September 2011, WSON began simulcasting on an FM translator, W243CU (96.5 FM), which is licensed to Sebree, Kentucky. W243CU, which has an effective radiated power of 250 watts, can be heard up to 30 miles in any direction from its transmitter site in the Wolf Hills north of Henderson. It allows listeners in Evansville and surrounding communities to listen to WSON's programming after nightfall, when the AM station has to adjust its coverage.
