= Providence Commercial Historic District =

Historic district in Kentucky, United States

- U.S. National Register of Historic Places
- U.S. Historic district
- Location within Kentucky Location within the United States
- Location: 100-200 blocks on E. and W. Main and N. and S. Broadway, Providence, Kentucky
- Coordinates: 37°23′51″N 87°45′47″W
- Area: 1 acre (0.40 ha)
- Built: 1882
- Architectural style: Classical Revival, Late Victorian, Beaux Arts
- NRHP reference No.: 93000042
- Added to NRHP: March 1, 1993

The Providence Commercial Historic District, in Providence, Kentucky, is a historic district which was listed on the National Register of Historic Places in 1993. It includes 25 contributing buildings and four non-contributing ones, along the 100-200 blocks on East and West Main and on North and South Broadway in downtown Providence.

The contributing buildings include:

- Alexander Niswonger Store (1911), 104 North Broadway, a two-story brick building with original cast iron storefront
- Nisbet-Berry Block (c. 1910), 105 and 107 West Main, with stepped back false front cornice. Both buildings have three arched brick bays on their second story
- Providence Banking Company (1914), 107 South Broadway, Beaux-Arts-style facade of Bowling Green marble

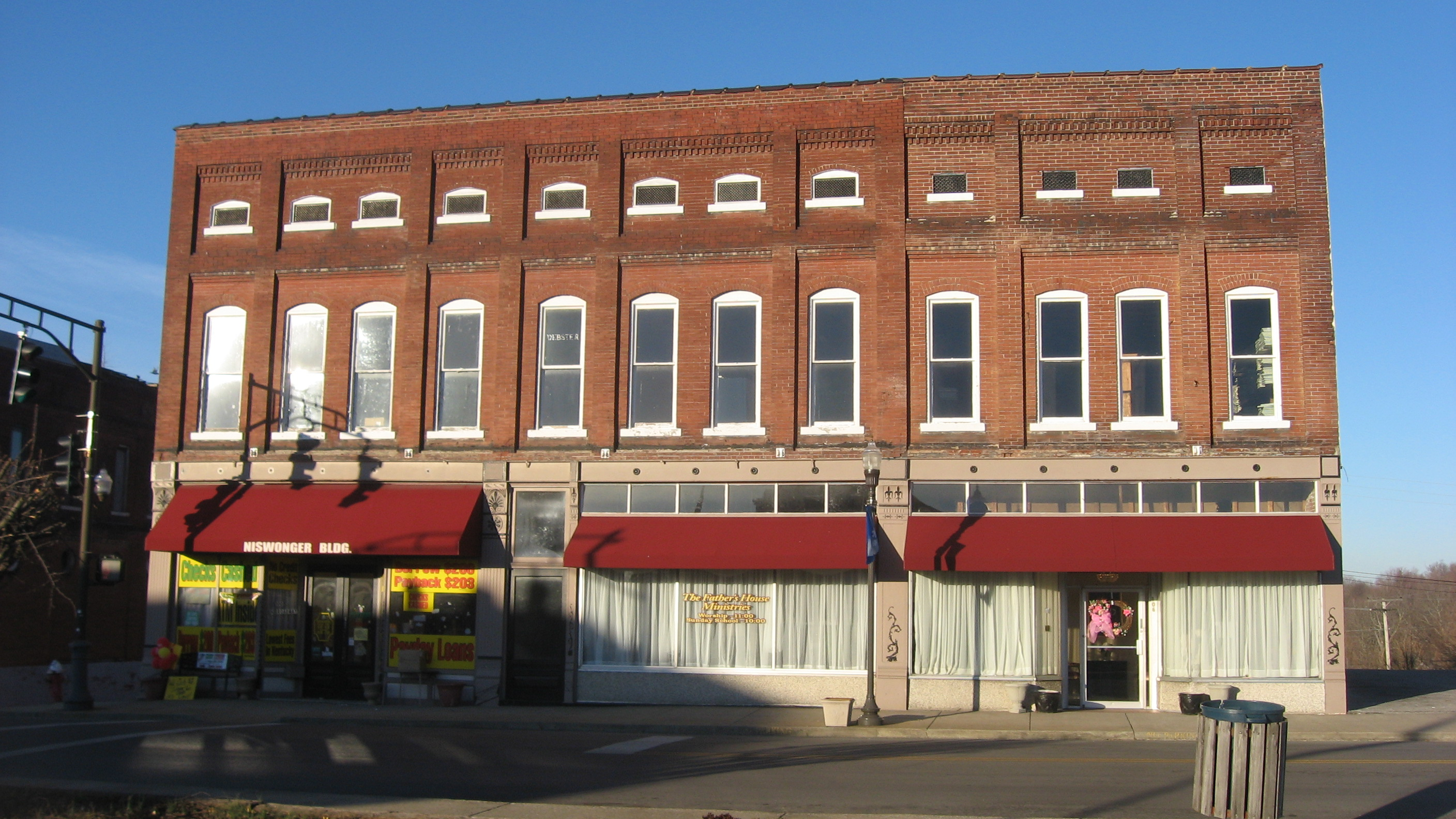
Non-contributing building at northwest corner of Broadway and Main
