= Webster County Courthouse (Kentucky) =

- U.S. National Register of Historic Places
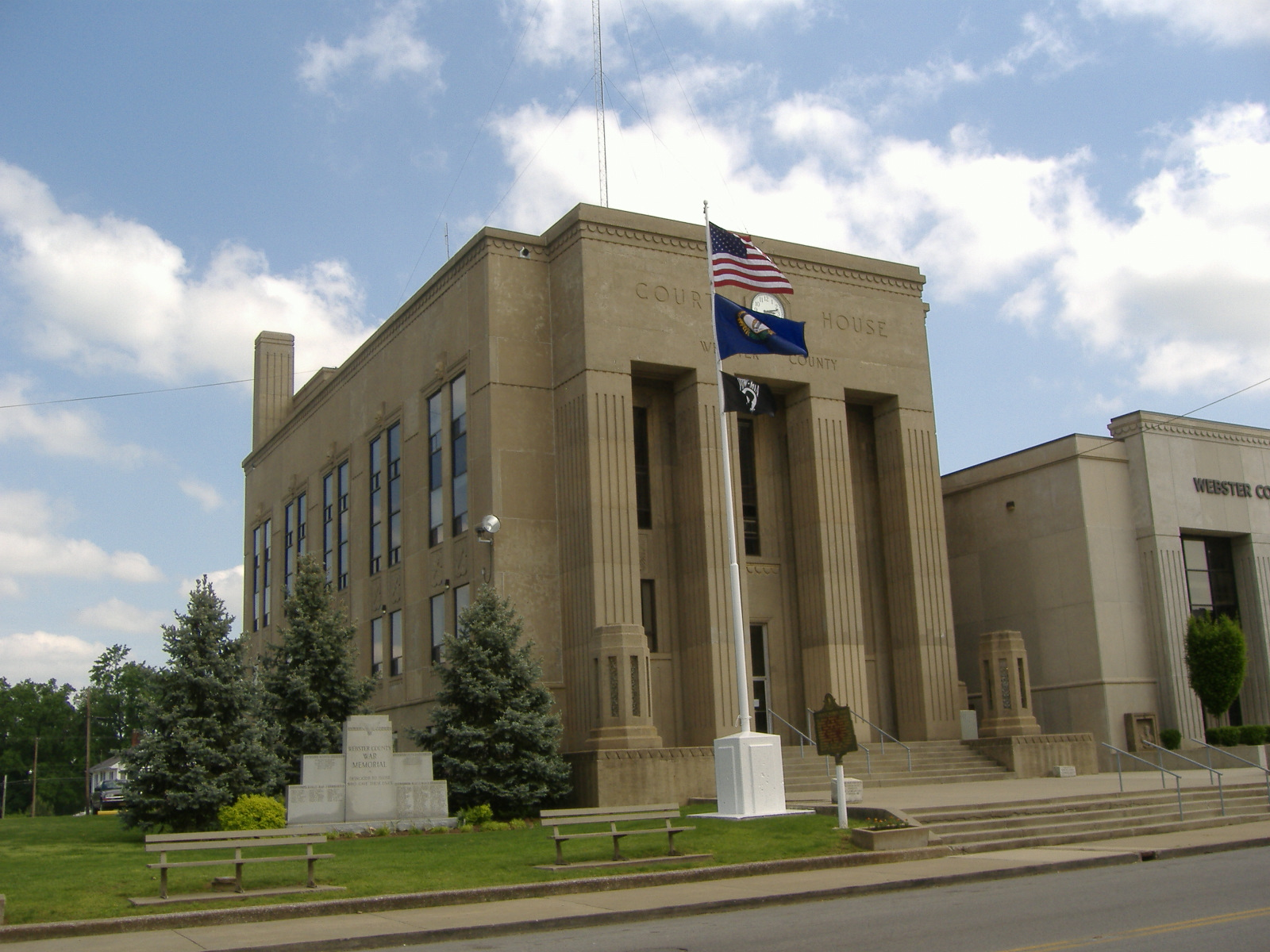

- Location within Kentucky Location within the United States
- Location: Courthouse Square, Dixon, Kentucky
- Coordinates: 37°31′01″N 87°41′27″W
- Area: 1 acre (0.40 ha)
- Built: 1938
- Built by: Works Progress Administration
- Architect: Casner, Lawrence
- Architectural style: Moderne
- NRHP reference No.: 91000924
- Added to NRHP: August 8, 1991

The Webster County Courthouse in Dixon, Kentucky, on Dixon's Courthouse Square, is a Moderne-style courthouse built in 1938. It was a Works Progress Administration project.

It is a three-story poured concrete building, 56 by 100 feet (17 m × 30 m) in plan.
