= Clay, Kentucky =

- City
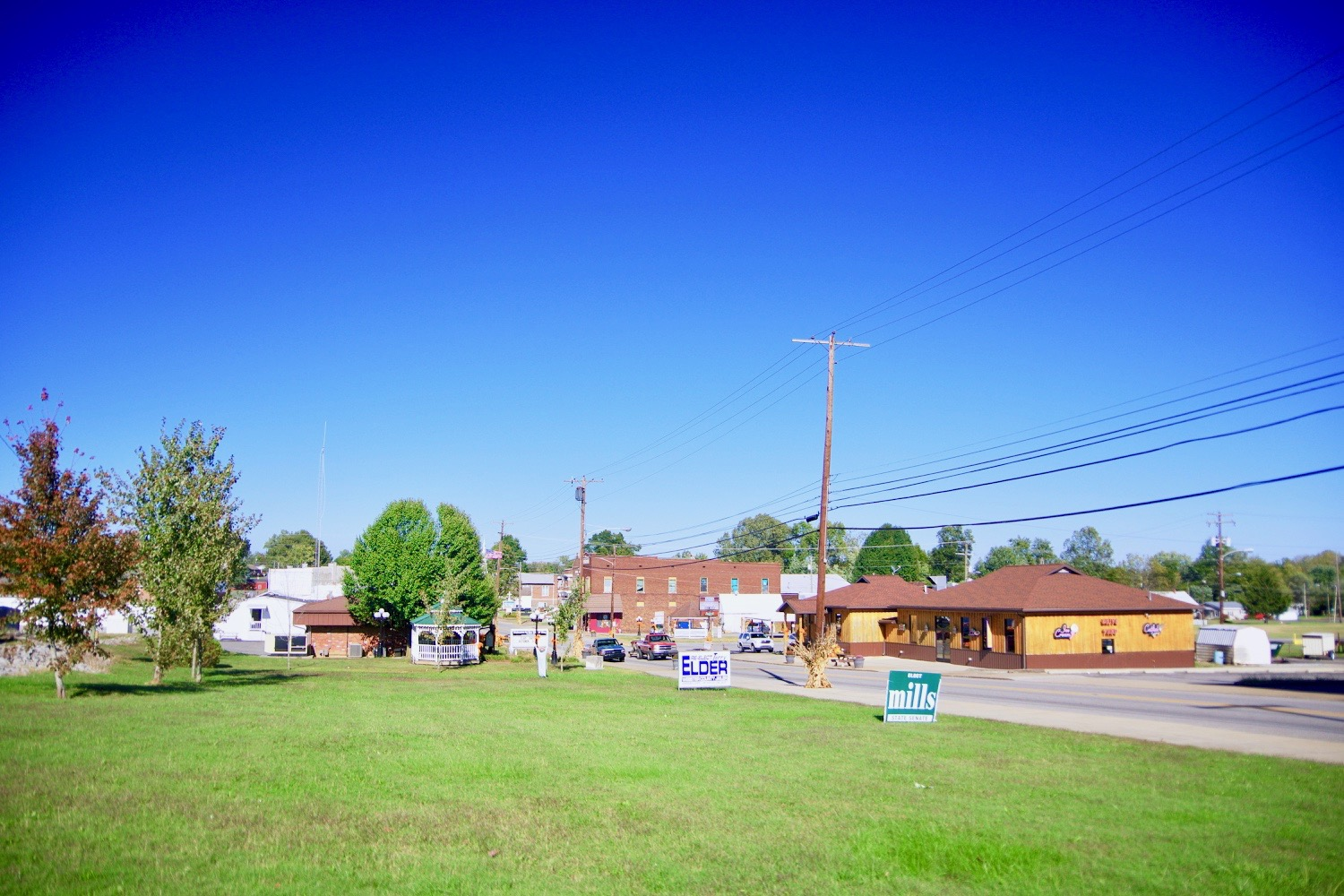
- Main Street (KY 109)

- Location of Clay in Webster County, Kentucky.
- Coordinates: 37°28′35″N 87°49′13″W
- Country: United States
- State: Kentucky
- County: Webster

Area
  - Total: 0.87 sq mi (2.25 km^{2})
  - Land: 0.86 sq mi (2.23 km^{2})
  - Water: 0.0077 sq mi (0.02 km^{2})
- Elevation: 381 ft (116 m)

Population (2020)
  - Total: 1,031
  - Density: 1,196.2/sq mi (461.86/km^{2})
- Time zone: UTC-6 (Central (CST))
  - Summer (DST): UTC-5 (CDT)
- ZIP code: 42404
- Area code: 270
- FIPS code: 21-15202
- GNIS feature ID: 2404064

Clay is a home rule-class city in Webster County, Kentucky, in the United States. The population was 1,031 at the 2020 census. Settled in 1837, the city is named for the statesman Henry Clay. In 2022, it became a wet city after a petition put the measure on the ballot.

== History ==
A post office was established in 1837 when the community was called Ashland, for Henry Clay's Lexington estate. It was renamed Clay in 1854. The city incorporated as "Claysville" in 1860, though the name was shortened to "Clay" in 1872.

== Geography ==
Clay is located at 37°28′41″N 87°49′15″W. The city is concentrated around the intersection of Kentucky Route 109 and Kentucky Route 132, northwest of Providence. The city of Wheatcroft lies just to the west along KY 109.

According to the United States Census Bureau, the city has a total area of 0.9 square miles (2.3 km^{2}), all land.

== Demographics ==
Historical population
Census	Pop.	Note	%±
1870	170		—
1880	248		45.9%
1890	323		30.2%
1900	450		39.3%
1910	1,098		144.0%
1920	1,378		25.5%
1930	1,551		12.6%
1940	1,429		−7.9%
1950	1,291		−9.7%
1960	1,343		4.0%
1970	1,426		6.2%
1980	1,356		−4.9%
1990	1,173		−13.5%
2000	1,179		0.5%
2010	1,181		0.2%
2020	1,031		−12.7%
U.S. Decennial Census

As of the census of 2000, there were 1,179 people, 485 households, and 333 families residing in the city. The population density was 1,300.9 inhabitants per square mile (502.3/km^{2}). There were 541 housing units at an average density of 596.9 per square mile (230.5/km^{2}). The racial makeup of the city was 99.15% White, 0.25% African American, 0.17% Asian, 0.17% Pacific Islander, and 0.25% from two or more races. Hispanic or Latino of any race were 0.34% of the population.

There were 485 households, out of which 31.1% had children under the age of 18 living with them, 55.9% were married couples living together, 9.1% had a female householder with no husband present, and 31.3% were non-families. 29.3% of all households were made up of individuals, and 15.7% had someone living alone who was 65 years of age or older. The average household size was 2.43 and the average family size was 2.99.

In the city, the population was spread out, with 24.8% under the age of 18, 7.8% from 18 to 24, 30.8% from 25 to 44, 21.4% from 45 to 64, and 15.3% who were 65 years of age or older. The median age was 37 years. For every 100 females, there were 97.2 males. For every 100 females age 18 and over, there were 92.0 males.

The median income for a household in the city was $31,625, and the median income for a family was $42,500. Males had a median income of $30,729 versus $16,538 for females. The per capita income for the city was $15,545. About 10.7% of families and 13.3% of the population were below the poverty line, including 23.1% of those under age 18 and 10.1% of those age 65 or over.

The city was featured in The Statler Brothers' song "How are Things in Clay, Kentucky?" (1980). The song was later covered by Wilson Fairchild, the country duo composed of Wil and Langdon Reid, sons of The Statler Brothers' two actual brothers, Harold and Don Reid.

== Education ==
The Webster County School District operates the public schools that serve Clay.

Clay Elementary School serves students Pre-School-6. In the late 1990s, a new gym and cafeteria were built for the school.

Webster County High School (in Dixon) serves high school students, while the Middle School is attached to the High School
