= WWKY-FM =

- Providence, Kentucky; United States
- Frequency: 104.9 MHz
- Branding: 104.9 Nash Icon

Programming
- Format: Country

Ownership
- Owner: Commonwealth Broadcasting Corporation; (Madisonville CBC, Inc.)
- Sister stations: WPKY

History
- First air date: March 22, 1979 (as WPKY-FM)
- Former call signs: WPKY-FM (1979–1994); WAVJ (1994–2017); WWKY (2017)

Technical information
- Licensing authority: FCC
- Facility ID: 15527
- Class: A
- ERP: 5,300 watts
- HAAT: 98 meters (322 ft)
- Transmitter coordinates: 37°24′52″N 87°34′23″W

Links
- Public license information: Public file; LMS

WWKY-FM (104.9 FM) is a radio station licensed to Providence, Kentucky, United States. The station is currently owned by Commonwealth Broadcasting Corporation, through licensee Madisonville CBC, Inc. Studios are in downtown Princeton at 108 West Main Street.

== History ==
The station, originally licensed to Princeton, went on the air as WPKY-FM on March 22, 1979, under ownership by Leslie Goodaker. The station was an FM simulcast of WPKY's AM signal (1580 kHz) until the stations were sold to DART, Inc., in November 1993. On January 15, 1994, the station changed its call sign to WAVJ, and began airing its country music format.

The station has been recognized on the local, state and national level for its efforts in the area of community service.

On April 1, 2013, WAVJ changed its format from adult contemporary to classic hits, branded as "104.9 The Wave".

On July 31, 2015, WAVJ went silent (off the air).

On August 1, 2015, WAVJ returned to the air with a simulcast of country-formatted WWKY 97.7 FM Providence, KY.

On July 20, 2016, WAVJ went silent.

On April 2, 2017, WAVJ returned to the air with a country format, branded as "104.9 Nash Icon".

On April 13, 2017, WAVJ changed its call sign to WWKY. On May 15, 2017, the station changed its call sign to WWKY-FM.

== Programming ==
The station broadcasts and streams Caldwell County High School Sports. Sports remain a primary concern for the station, although other possible topics have been making themselves known as of late. The station also broadcasts University of Kentucky Football and Basketball, as well as Tennessee Titans Football.
