= WPKY =

- Princeton, Kentucky; United States
- Broadcast area: Eddyville, Kentucky; Providence, Kentucky
- Frequency: 1580 kHz
- Branding: WPKY 103.3/1580

Programming
- Format: Classic hits
- Affiliations: Fox News Radio

Ownership
- Owner: Beth Mann; (Ham Broadcasting Company, Inc.)

History
- First air date: March 15, 1950; 75 years ago
- Call sign meaning: Princeton, Kentucky

Technical information
- Licensing authority: FCC
- Facility ID: 50637
- Class: D
- Power: 250 watts day; 9 watts night
- Transmitter coordinates: 37°7′14″N 87°51′31″W
- Translator: 103.3 W277CK (Princeton)

Links
- Public license information: Public file; LMS
- Webcast: Listen Live
- Website: wpkyonline.com

WPKY (1580 AM) is a radio station licensed to Princeton, Kentucky, United States. The station is currently owned by Beth Mann, through licensee Ham Broadcasting.

== History ==
The station began broadcasting on March 15, 1950 under ownership of Leslie Goodaker, a former engineer at Owensboro's WOMI. He and his wife, Mayme, operated the station for more than first four decades on the air until selling the station to DART, Inc., in November 1993. The station's programming was also broadcast on WPKY-FM (104.9 MHz, now Providence, Kentucky-based WWKY-FM) from 1969 until that station became a separate entity by becoming a country music station after the 1993 sale.

In 2016, the station and its translator was sold to Tiger Media from Commonwealth Broadcasting. The previous owners took the station off the air in the previous year. It resumed broadcasting under with its current format.

In September 2018, WPKY was sold to its current owner, Ham Broadcasting of nearby Cadiz, Kentucky.
