= Slaughters, Kentucky =

- City
- Location of Slaughters in Webster County, Kentucky.
- Coordinates: 37°29′23″N 87°30′3″W
- Country: United States
- State: Kentucky
- County: Webster

Area
  - Total: 0.23 sq mi (0.60 km^{2})
  - Land: 0.23 sq mi (0.60 km^{2})
  - Water: 0 sq mi (0.00 km^{2})
- Elevation: 420 ft (130 m)

Population (2020)
  - Total: 190
  - Density: 826.6/sq mi (319.14/km^{2})
- Time zone: UTC-6 (Central (CST))
  - Summer (DST): UTC-5 (CDT)
- ZIP code: 42456
- Area code: 270
- FIPS code: 21-71130
- GNIS feature ID: 0503668
- Website: https://cityofslaughtersky.org/

Slaughters is a home rule-class city in Webster County, Kentucky, United States. As of the 2020 census, Slaughters had a population of 190. Slaughters lies just west of US 41 and 9.5 mi (15.3 km) east of Dixon.

CSX Transportation runs through Slaughters and operates a siding track that is named after the city.

== History ==
According to local tradition, it was named for Gustavus Slaughter who won the right to name the town and post office after winning a game of cards in 1855.

The post office was established as Slaughtersville on January 29, 1856, with Henry A. Prater, postmaster. Slaughter himself served as postmaster from 1860 to 1865 and was succeeded by Stiman.

Though the post office was renamed Slaughters in 1915, the town remained Slaughtersville from its incorporation in 1861 until 1967 when the Board on Geographic Names reversed an earlier decision and conformed to common usage and the present name of the post office.

== Geography ==
According to the United States Census Bureau, the city has a total area of 0.2 square miles (0.52 km^{2}), all land.

== Demographics ==
Historical population
Census	Pop.	Note	%±
1870	130		—
1880	269		106.9%
1890	493		83.3%
1900	583		18.3%
1910	443		−24.0%
1920	664		49.9%
1930	347		−47.7%
1940	344		−0.9%
1950	326		−5.2%
1960	284		−12.9%
1970	276		−2.8%
1980	269		−2.5%
1990	235		−12.6%
2000	238		1.3%
2010	216		−9.2%
2020	190		−12.0%
U.S. Decennial Census

As of the census of 2000, there were 238 people, 93 households, and 70 families residing in the city. The population density was 1,049.7 inhabitants per square mile (405.3/km^{2}). There were 104 housing units at an average density of 458.7 per square mile (177.1/km^{2}). The racial makeup of the city was 99.58% White and 0.42% Asian.

There were 93 households, out of which 33.3% had children under the age of 18 living with them, 63.4% were married couples living together, 10.8% had a female householder with no husband present, and 23.7% were non-families. 21.5% of all households were made up of individuals, and 10.8% had someone living alone who was 65 years of age or older. The average household size was 2.56 and the average family size was 2.93.

In the city, the population was spread out, with 27.7% under the age of 18, 6.7% from 18 to 24, 29.0% from 25 to 44, 24.4% from 45 to 64, and 12.2% who were 65 years of age or older. The median age was 34 years. For every 100 females, there were 85.9 males. For every 100 females age 18 and over, there were 83.0 males.

The median income for a household in the city was $40,000, and the median income for a family was $47,917. Males had a median income of $38,125 versus $21,875 for females. The per capita income for the city was $14,337. About 7.1% of families and 10.2% of the population were below the poverty line, including 9.4% of those under the age of eighteen and 26.7% of those 65 or over.

== Notable people ==
- Chris Knight, country singer and songwriter
