= WUCO =

- Morganfield, Kentucky; United States
- Broadcast area: Evansville, Indiana
- Frequency: 1550 kHz
- Branding: The Sports Edge 1550 AM

Programming
- Format: Sports
- Affiliations: Fox Sports Radio, Kentucky Sports Radio

Ownership
- Owner: Henson Media, Inc.
- Sister stations: WMSK-FM, WSON

History
- First air date: November 1960 (as WMSK)
- Former call signs: WMSK (1960–1999); WYGS (1999–2000); WMSK (2000–2015)

Technical information
- Licensing authority: FCC
- Facility ID: 68808
- Class: D
- Power: 145 watts day 6 watts night
- Transmitter coordinates: 37°40′4″N 87°55′46″W
- Translator: 107.7 W299CH (Morganfield)

Links
- Public license information: Public file; LMS

WUCO (1550 AM) is a radio station broadcasting a sports format. Licensed to Morganfield, Kentucky, United States, the station serves the Evansville area. The station is currently owned by Henson Media, Inc. and features programming from Fox Sports Radio and Kentucky Sports Radio.

== FM Translator ==
In addition to the main station at 1550 kHz, WUCO is relayed by an FM translator, to widen its broadcast area, especially during nighttime hours when the AM frequency reduces power to only 6 watts.

Broadcast translator for WUCO
Call sign	Frequency	City of license	FID	ERP (W)	Class	FCC info
W299CH	107.7 FM	Morganfield, Kentucky	145129	250	D	LMS

== History ==
The station went on the air in November 1960, and, with the exception of a brief period in 1999-2000 using the call sign WYGS, the station had always been known as WMSK.

On January 3, 2011, the station switched from its former classic country music format to sports, affiliating with Fox Sports Radio and Kentucky Sports Radio.

The station changed from WMSK to the current WUCO call sign on February 12, 2015.
