= WMSK-FM =

- Sturgis, Kentucky; United States
- Broadcast area: Evansville, Indiana
- Frequency: 101.3 MHz
- Branding: 101.3 FM WMSK

Programming
- Format: Country music
- Affiliations: AP Radio, Jones Radio Network

Ownership
- Owner: Henson Media, Inc.
- Sister stations: WSON, WUCO

History
- Former call signs: WEZG (2005–2006)

Technical information
- Licensing authority: FCC
- Facility ID: 162349
- Class: A
- ERP: 5,400 watts
- HAAT: 83 meters (272 ft)
- Transmitter coordinates: 37°40′4″N 87°55′46″W

Links
- Public license information: Public file; LMS
- Website: WMSK-FM

WMSK-FM (101.3 FM) is a radio station broadcasting a country music format. Licensed to Sturgis, Kentucky, United States, the station serves the Evansville area. The station is currently owned by Henson Media, Inc. and features programming from AP Radio and Jones Radio Network.

== History ==
The station went on the air as WEZG on March 23, 2005. On November 1, 2006, the station changed its call sign to the current WMSK-FM.

== See also ==
- List of radio stations in Kentucky
