= Webster County, Kentucky =

County in Kentucky, United States

- County
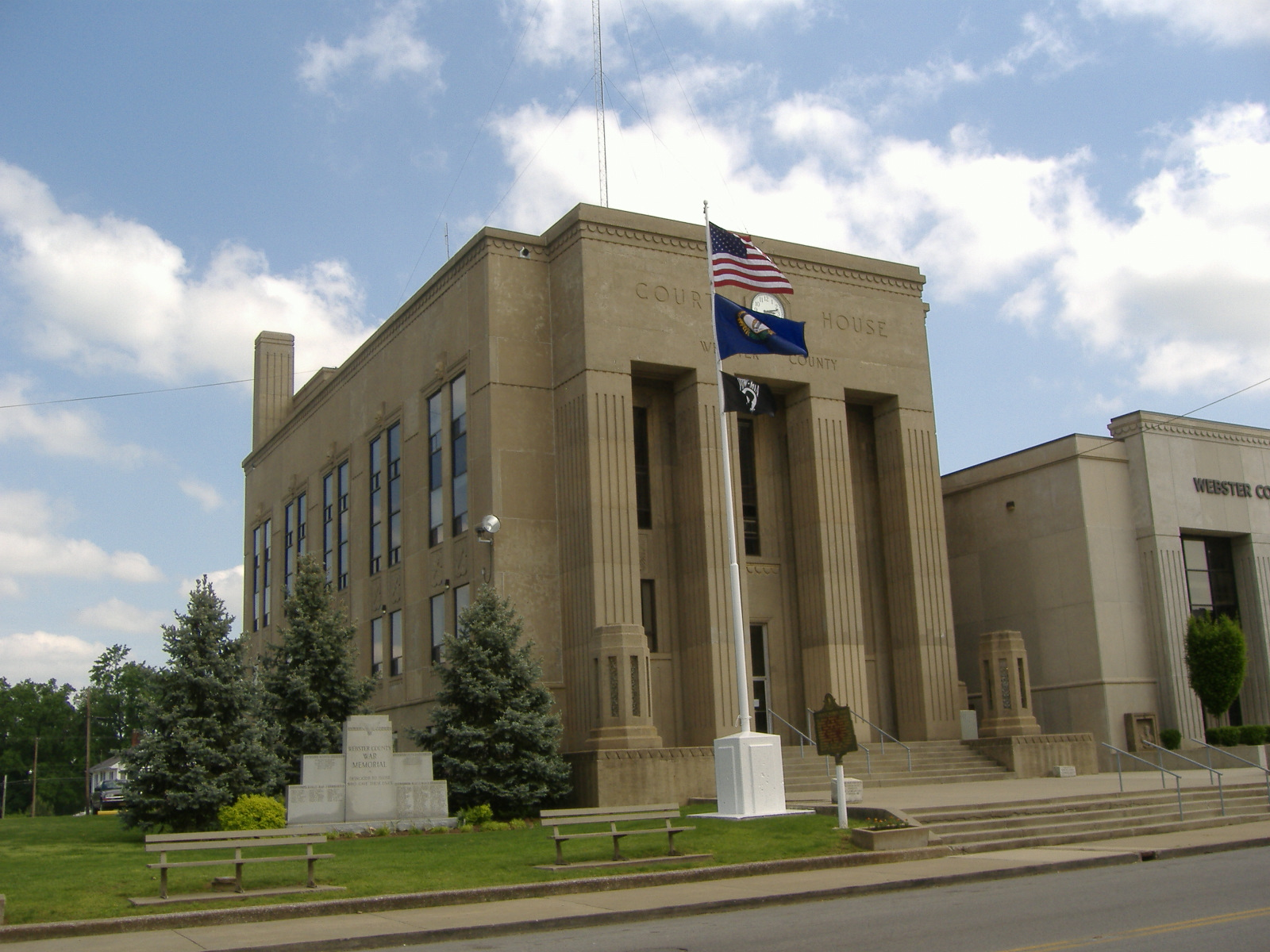
- Webster County Courthouse in Dixon

- Location within the U.S. state of Kentucky
- Coordinates: 37°31′N 87°41′W
- Country: United States
- State: Kentucky
- Founded: 1860
- Named for: Daniel Webster
- Seat: Dixon
- Largest city: Providence

Government
  - Judge/Executive: Steve Henry (R)

Area
  - Total: 336 sq mi (870 km^{2})
  - Land: 332 sq mi (860 km^{2})
  - Water: 3.7 sq mi (9.6 km^{2}) 1.1%

Population (2020)
  - Total: 13,017
  - Estimate (2025): 12,929 ▼
  - Density: 39.2/sq mi (15.1/km^{2})
- Time zone: UTC−6 (Central)
  - Summer (DST): UTC−5 (CDT)
- Congressional district: 1st
- Website: www.webstercountyky.com

Webster County is a county located in the U.S. state of Kentucky. As of the 2020 census, the population was 13,017. Its county seat is Dixon and its largest city is Providence. It is the southernmost county in the Evansville, IN–KY Combined Statistical Area. The county was formed in 1860 from parts of Henderson, Hopkins, and Union Counties and named for American statesman Daniel Webster (1782–1852). It was mainly pro-Confederate during the American Civil War and was the site of several skirmishes and some guerrilla warfare. Since 2018 it has been a moist county, with Providence and Sebree voting to allow alcohol sales, and Clay doing so in 2022.

== Geography ==
According to the United States Census Bureau, the county has a total area of 336 square miles (870 km^{2}), of which 332 square miles (860 km^{2}) is land and 3.7 square miles (9.6 km^{2}) (1.1%) is water. Webster County is part of the Western Coal Field region of Kentucky.

=== Adjacent counties ===
- Henderson County (north)
- McLean County (northeast)
- Hopkins County (southeast)
- Caldwell County (south)
- Crittenden County (southwest)
- Union County (northwest)

== Demographics ==
Historical population
Census	Pop.	Note	%±
1870	10,937		—
1880	14,246		30.3%
1890	17,196		20.7%
1900	20,097		16.9%
1910	20,974		4.4%
1920	20,762		−1.0%
1930	20,534		−1.1%
1940	19,198		−6.5%
1950	15,555		−19.0%
1960	14,244		−8.4%
1970	13,282		−6.8%
1980	14,832		11.7%
1990	13,955		−5.9%
2000	14,120		1.2%
2010	13,621		−3.5%
2020	13,017		−4.4%
2025 (est.)	12,929	▼	−0.7%
U.S. Decennial Census; 1790-1960 1900-1990; 1990-2000 2010-2020

=== 2020 census ===
As of the 2020 census, the county had a population of 13,017. The median age was 41.7 years. 23.5% of residents were under the age of 18 and 18.5% of residents were 65 years of age or older. For every 100 females there were 100.3 males, and for every 100 females age 18 and over there were 99.5 males age 18 and over.

The racial makeup of the county was 87.9% White, 3.7% Black or African American, 0.7% American Indian and Alaska Native, 0.2% Asian, 0.0% Native Hawaiian and Pacific Islander, 3.1% from some other race, and 4.3% from two or more races. Hispanic or Latino residents of any race comprised 6.5% of the population.

0.0% of residents lived in urban areas, while 100.0% lived in rural areas.

There were 5,034 households in the county, of which 31.6% had children under the age of 18 living with them and 23.7% had a female householder with no spouse or partner present. About 26.2% of all households were made up of individuals and 12.5% had someone living alone who was 65 years of age or older.

There were 5,705 housing units, of which 11.8% were vacant. Among occupied housing units, 74.7% were owner-occupied and 25.3% were renter-occupied. The homeowner vacancy rate was 1.1% and the rental vacancy rate was 9.1%.

=== 2010 census ===
As of the census of 2010, 5,272 households, and 3,716 families residing in the county. The population density was 42 per square mile (16/km^{2}). There were 5,936 housing units at an average density of 19 per square mile (7.3/km^{2}). The racial makeup of the county was 91.4% White, 4.1% Black or African American, 0.2% Native American, 0.3% Asian, 0.3% Pacific Islander, 2.3% from other races, and 1.4% from two or more races. 4.3% of the population were Hispanic or Latino of any race.

There were 5,272 households, out of which 27.2% had children under the age of 18 living with them, 55% were married couples living together, 10.8% had a female householder with no husband present, and 29.5% were non-families. 25.4% of all households were made up of individuals, and 11.6% had someone living alone who was 65 years of age or older. The average household size was 2.51 and the average family size was 2.98.

In the county, the population was spread out, with 25.9% under the age of 19, 5.8% from 20 to 24, 25% from 25 to 44, 28.2% from 45 to 64, and 15.1% who were 65 years of age or older. The median age was 40.1 years. 49.7% of the population is male and 50.3% female.

The median income for a household in the county was $39,635, and the median income for a family was $49,580. Males employed full-time had a median income of $41,662 versus $26,502 for females. The per capita income for the county was $18,879. About 11.9% of families and 16% of the population were below the poverty line, including 21.9% of those under age 18 and 11.6% of those age 65 or over.

== Politics ==
United States presidential election results for Webster County, Kentucky
Year	Republican		Democratic		Third party(ies)	
Year	No.	%	No.	%	No.	%
1912	905	22.47%	2,036	50.55%	1,087	26.99%
1916	2,082	43.35%	2,673	55.65%	48	1.00%
1920	3,554	42.23%	4,831	57.41%	30	0.36%
1924	3,131	47.08%	3,449	51.86%	71	1.07%
1928	3,527	49.49%	3,591	50.39%	9	0.13%
1932	2,257	31.62%	4,833	67.71%	48	0.67%
1936	1,983	29.20%	4,788	70.49%	21	0.31%
1940	2,107	33.33%	4,197	66.40%	17	0.27%
1944	1,840	35.46%	3,324	64.06%	25	0.48%
1948	1,087	23.93%	3,288	72.38%	168	3.70%
1952	1,858	34.50%	3,516	65.28%	12	0.22%
1956	1,948	37.08%	3,050	58.06%	255	4.85%
1960	2,498	44.00%	3,179	56.00%	0	0.00%
1964	1,217	24.52%	3,741	75.36%	6	0.12%
1968	1,446	29.48%	2,114	43.10%	1,345	27.42%
1972	2,396	57.57%	1,712	41.13%	54	1.30%
1976	1,402	28.21%	3,523	70.89%	45	0.91%
1980	1,939	35.03%	3,506	63.34%	90	1.63%
1984	2,504	44.87%	3,042	54.52%	34	0.61%
1988	2,159	41.50%	3,019	58.04%	24	0.46%
1992	1,408	24.85%	3,380	59.66%	877	15.48%
1996	1,568	30.73%	2,852	55.90%	682	13.37%
2000	2,599	51.24%	2,388	47.08%	85	1.68%
2004	3,207	57.82%	2,304	41.54%	36	0.65%
2008	3,037	54.82%	2,390	43.14%	113	2.04%
2012	3,607	65.94%	1,765	32.27%	98	1.79%
2016	4,397	75.75%	1,240	21.36%	168	2.89%
2020	4,506	75.19%	1,412	23.56%	75	1.25%
2024	4,339	78.10%	1,153	20.75%	64	1.15%

=== Elected officials ===
Elected officials as of January 3, 2025
U.S. House	James Comer (R)	KY 1
Ky. Senate	Robby Mills (R)	4
Ky. House	Jim Gooch Jr. (R)	12

== Communities ==
=== Cities ===
- Clay
- Dixon (county seat)
- Providence
- Sebree
- Slaughters
- Wheatcroft

=== Census-designated places ===
- Onton
- Poole (partially in Henderson County)

=== Other unincorporated communities ===
- Blackford
- Derby
- Diamond
- Elmwood
- Fairmont
- Free Union
- Hearin
- Jolly
- Lisman
- Little Zion
- Ortiz
- Pratt
- Stanhope
- Tilden
- Vanderburg
- Wanamaker

== Notable residents ==
- Robert A. Baker, psychologist, author, influential skeptic, and Past Fellow of the Committee for Skeptical Inquiry
- William O. Head, mayor of Louisville, Kentucky from 1909 to 1913
- Kristen Johnson, Miss Kentucky USA 2005, 2nd runner-up Miss USA 2005, Miss Kentucky Teen USA 2000
- Chris Knight, musician/songwriter.
- Cale Young Rice, American poet and dramatist.
- Laban Lacy Rice, educator, author, and President of Cumberland University
- Garrett L. Withers, represented Kentucky in both the United States Senate and the House of Representatives
- Amy Slaton-Halterman, reality TV star
- Tammy Slaton, reality TV star

== See also ==
- Webster County School District
- National Register of Historic Places listings in Webster County, Kentucky
