= Providence, Kentucky =

- City
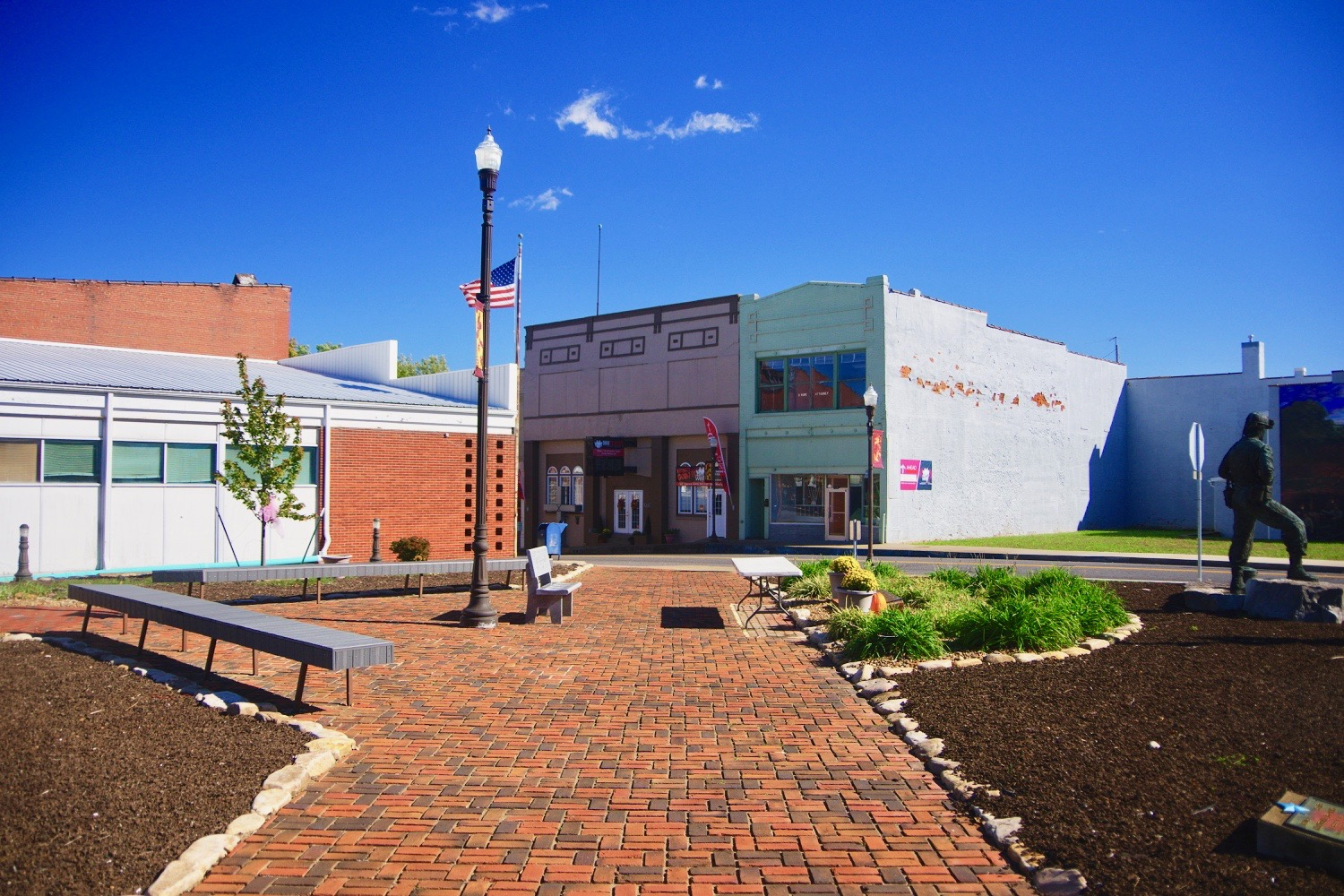
- Main Street Park

- Location of Providence in Webster County, Kentucky.
- Coordinates: 37°23′54″N 87°45′25″W
- Country: United States
- State: Kentucky
- County: Webster
- Established: 1840
- Incorporated: 1860
- Named for: the theological concept

Area
  - Total: 6.08 sq mi (15.74 km^{2})
  - Land: 6.03 sq mi (15.61 km^{2})
  - Water: 0.050 sq mi (0.13 km^{2})
- Elevation: 440 ft (130 m)

Population (2020)
  - Total: 2,892
  - Estimate (2024): 2,856
  - Density: 479.7/sq mi (185.23/km^{2})
- Time zone: UTC-6 (Central (CST))
  - Summer (DST): UTC-5 (CDT)
- ZIP code: 42450
- Area codes: 270 & 364
- FIPS code: 21-63372
- GNIS feature ID: 0501368
- Website: www.webstercountyky.com/providence.php

Providence is a home rule-class city in Webster County, Kentucky, in the United States. As of the 2020 census, Providence had a population of 2,892, making it the most populous community in the county.

== History ==
In 1820, Richard B. Savage arrived from Virginia with his wife and his elder sister Mary (Savage) Settler, and opened a general store on the site of the present city. The community that grew up was known as Savageville, until the post office was established in 1828, when it was renamed "Providence". Though sometimes said to honor the Rhode Island city of that name, local history records that an old trader who had been helped by nearby farmers suggested the name to honor divine Providence. On February 18, 1840, the town had a population of 150; there were three physicians, five stores, two hotels, a school, a Baptist church, a Masonic lodge, and three tobacco stemmeries. Located in the heart of the state's Black Patch tobacco-growing region, Providence eventually became the 3rd-largest stemming market in all of America.

Providence was incorporated in 1860, when Webster County was formed. The onset of the Civil War slowed the economic growth, though no major battles took place. The State of Kentucky never left the Union, but inhabitants in Western Kentucky were still largely sympathetic to pro-Confederate troops. A Confederate reconnaissance and foraging party led by then Lieutenant Colonel Nathan Bedford Forrest passed through Webster County between November and December 1861, and Forrest reported that he had been welcomed by the inhabitants. Limited guerrilla warfare also took place near the city in 1862.

Commercial coal mining began in 1888, and by 1930 Providence residents numbered 4,742. In the 1930s, depressed conditions in the coal fields resulted in a loss of population that continued through the 1960s. Providence's economy remains tied to coal and agriculture.

In 1993, the Providence Commercial Historic District was created to recognize the historic buildings in the downtown area.

== Geography ==
Providence is located at 37°23′54″N 87°45′25″W (37.398389, -87.757077) The city is concentrated around the intersection of Kentucky Route 109 and Kentucky Route 120, approximately 17 miles (27 km) northwest of Madisonville. The Tradewater River flows just west of the city, and the Webster-Hopkins county line lies just to the southeast. U.S. Route 41A passes through the eastern part of Providence.

=== Climate ===
Climate data for Providence, Kentucky (1991–2020 normals, extremes 1979–present)
Month	Jan	Feb	Mar	Apr	May	Jun	Jul	Aug	Sep	Oct	Nov	Dec	Year
Record high °F (°C)	74 (23)	79 (26)	88 (31)	92 (33)	95 (35)	107 (42)	105 (41)	106 (41)	104 (40)	97 (36)	86 (30)	75 (24)	107 (42)
Mean maximum °F (°C)	66.0 (18.9)	70.1 (21.2)	78.3 (25.7)	85.1 (29.5)	90.7 (32.6)	95.7 (35.4)	97.8 (36.6)	98.9 (37.2)	94.8 (34.9)	87.0 (30.6)	77.1 (25.1)	67.9 (19.9)	99.8 (37.7)
Mean daily maximum °F (°C)	43.4 (6.3)	48.0 (8.9)	57.8 (14.3)	69.3 (20.7)	78.3 (25.7)	86.3 (30.2)	89.6 (32.0)	88.6 (31.4)	82.7 (28.2)	71.2 (21.8)	57.9 (14.4)	47.4 (8.6)	68.4 (20.2)
Daily mean °F (°C)	34.1 (1.2)	37.7 (3.2)	46.8 (8.2)	57.3 (14.1)	67.3 (19.6)	75.7 (24.3)	79.3 (26.3)	77.7 (25.4)	70.6 (21.4)	58.8 (14.9)	46.8 (8.2)	38.1 (3.4)	57.5 (14.2)
Mean daily minimum °F (°C)	24.9 (−3.9)	27.5 (−2.5)	35.7 (2.1)	45.2 (7.3)	56.3 (13.5)	65.1 (18.4)	69.0 (20.6)	66.7 (19.3)	58.4 (14.7)	46.3 (7.9)	35.6 (2.0)	28.9 (−1.7)	46.6 (8.1)
Mean minimum °F (°C)	6.4 (−14.2)	9.5 (−12.5)	19.6 (−6.9)	30.3 (−0.9)	40.3 (4.6)	52.3 (11.3)	58.9 (14.9)	57.0 (13.9)	43.6 (6.4)	29.9 (−1.2)	21.0 (−6.1)	13.2 (−10.4)	2.4 (−16.4)
Record low °F (°C)	−16 (−27)	−9 (−23)	−2 (−19)	20 (−7)	32 (0)	43 (6)	50 (10)	42 (6)	35 (2)	21 (−6)	9 (−13)	−13 (−25)	−16 (−27)
Average precipitation inches (mm)	2.72 (69)	3.78 (96)	4.73 (120)	5.10 (130)	5.00 (127)	4.59 (117)	4.78 (121)	2.61 (66)	3.34 (85)	3.47 (88)	3.86 (98)	4.53 (115)	48.51 (1,232)
Average precipitation days (≥ 0.01 in)	9.0	9.4	10.4	10.2	10.6	8.4	8.1	6.5	6.5	7.5	8.1	10.3	105.0
Source: NOAA

== Demographics ==
Historical population
Census	Pop.	Note	%±
1880	267		—
1890	522		95.5%
1900	1,286		146.4%
1910	2,084		62.1%
1920	4,151		99.2%
1930	4,742		14.2%
1940	4,397		−7.3%
1950	3,905		−11.2%
1960	3,771		−3.4%
1970	4,270		13.2%
1980	4,434		3.8%
1990	4,123		−7.0%
2000	3,611		−12.4%
2010	3,193		−11.6%
2020	2,892		−9.4%
2024 (est.)	2,856		−1.2%
U.S. Decennial Census

=== 2020 census ===
As of the 2020 census, Providence had a population of 2,892. The median age was 42.9 years. 22.3% of residents were under the age of 18 and 21.0% of residents were 65 years of age or older. For every 100 females there were 91.8 males, and for every 100 females age 18 and over there were 87.9 males age 18 and over.

0.0% of residents lived in urban areas, while 100.0% lived in rural areas.

There were 1,237 households in Providence, of which 28.5% had children under the age of 18 living in them. Of all households, 39.5% were married-couple households, 20.2% were households with a male householder and no spouse or partner present, and 33.1% were households with a female householder and no spouse or partner present. About 34.4% of all households were made up of individuals and 16.5% had someone living alone who was 65 years of age or older.

There were 1,486 housing units, of which 16.8% were vacant. The homeowner vacancy rate was 2.3% and the rental vacancy rate was 13.9%.

Racial composition as of the 2020 census
Race	Number	Percent
White	2,335	80.7%
Black or African American	367	12.7%
American Indian and Alaska Native	7	0.2%
Asian	6	0.2%
Native Hawaiian and Other Pacific Islander	0	0.0%
Some other race	14	0.5%
Two or more races	163	5.6%
Hispanic or Latino (of any race)	51	1.8%

=== 2000 census ===
As of the 2000 census, there were 3,611 people, 1,487 households, and 1,029 families residing in the city. The population density was 587.2 inhabitants per square mile (226.7/km^{2}). There were 1,754 housing units at an average density of 285.2 per square mile (110.1/km^{2}). The racial makeup of the city was 81.92% White, 16.53% African American, 0.11% Native American, 0.08% Asian, 0.08% Pacific Islander, 0.28% from other races, and 1.00% from two or more races. Hispanic or Latino of any race were 0.86% of the population.

There were 1,487 households, out of which 30.3% had children under the age of 18 living with them, 49.1% were married couples living together, 17.1% had a female householder with no husband present, and 30.8% were non-families. 28.5% of all households were made up of individuals, and 14.9% had someone living alone who was 65 years of age or older. The average household size was 2.38 and the average family size was 2.90.

The age distribution was 24.4% under the age of 18, 9.0% from 18 to 24, 25.6% from 25 to 44, 24.0% from 45 to 64, and 16.9% who were 65 years of age or older. The median age was 38 years. For every 100 females, there were 85.2 males. For every 100 females age 18 and over, there were 79.0 males.

The median income for a household in the city was $27,400, and the median income for a family was $31,125. Males had a median income of $28,716 versus $23,438 for females. The per capita income for the city was $14,209. About 19.4% of families and 22.5% of the population were below the poverty line, including 30.7% of those under age 18 and 22.1% of those age 65 or over.

== Economy ==
Providence is located in Webster County, Kentucky, part of the Illinois Coal Basin. Coal mining is a major source of income for Webster County and the surrounding counties.

== Education ==
The Webster County School District operates the public schools that serve Providence.

In 2007 the Providence Independent School System merged with the Webster County School System, closing the high school and renaming Broadway Elementary, Providence Elementary. The elementary school serves students Pre-School-6. In 2014, a middle school was built adjacent to Webster County High School.

Providence has a lending library, a branch of the Webster County Public Library.

== Arts and culture ==
Every year in June Providence hosts the annual Coal Festival in celebration of the coal mines and miners that have long been a part of the city's history. It features games, rides, beauty contests and live entertainment.

== Notable people ==
Roger Campbell was a member of the 1960 US Figure Skating World Team. He was a casualty of Sabena Flight 548, which crashed in 1961 en route to the World Championships in Prague. He is buried in Providence's Big Hill Cemetery.

Melvin T Mason was a 1984 candidate for President of the United States, running on the Socialist Workers Party ticket.
