= Dixon, Kentucky =

- City
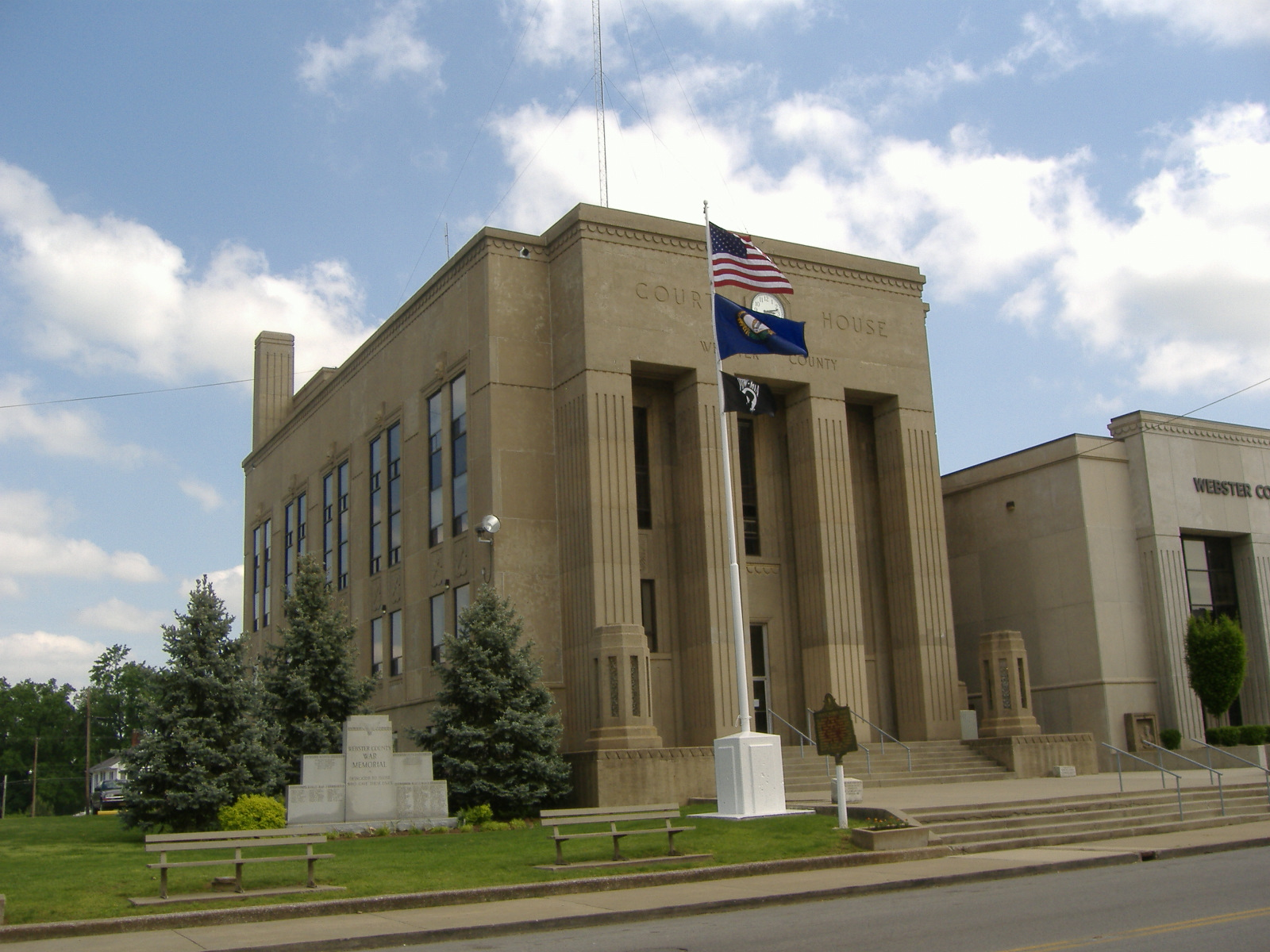
- Webster County Courthouse in Dixon

- Location of Dixon in Webster County, Kentucky.
- Coordinates: 37°30′36″N 87°41′55″W
- Country: United States
- State: Kentucky
- County: Webster

Area
  - Total: 1.26 sq mi (3.27 km^{2})
  - Land: 1.25 sq mi (3.24 km^{2})
  - Water: 0.015 sq mi (0.04 km^{2})
- Elevation: 531 ft (162 m)

Population (2020)
  - Total: 933
  - Density: 746.8/sq mi (288.35/km^{2})
- Time zone: UTC-6 (Central (CST))
  - Summer (DST): UTC-5 (CDT)
- ZIP code: 42409
- Area codes: 270 & 364
- FIPS code: 21-21682
- GNIS feature ID: 0490922
- Website: dixon.ky.gov

Dixon is a home rule-class city in and the county seat of Webster County, Kentucky, United States. The population was 933 at the 2020 census. Dixon is located at the junction of US 41A and KY 132. It was established with a courthouse and post office in 1860 when the county was formed.

== History ==
Revolutionary War veteran William Jenkins in 1794 established a stagecoach inn five miles (8 km) north of the town's present site on the old Indian trail between Nashville and St. Louis.

The town was incorporated on February 6, 1861, and was named after Archibald Dixon, lieutenant governor of the state from 1844 to 1848 and U.S. Senator from 1852 to 1855). The notorious Harpe brothers, murderous outlaws, terrorized the area in the late 18th century.

The downtown area has several historic homes and was the site of a number of Civil War skirmishes.

== Geography ==
Dixon is located at 37°30′36″N 87°41′55″W.

According to the United States Census Bureau, the city has a total area of 1.0 square mile (2.6 km^{2}), of which, 0.9 square miles (2.3 km^{2}) of it is land and 1.04% is water.

== Demographics ==
Historical population
Census	Pop.	Note	%±
1870	330		—
1880	515		56.1%
1890	546		6.0%
1900	569		4.2%
1910	741		30.2%
1920	716		−3.4%
1930	650		−9.2%
1940	642		−1.2%
1950	624		−2.8%
1960	541		−13.3%
1970	572		5.7%
1980	533		−6.8%
1990	552		3.6%
2000	632		14.5%
2010	786		24.4%
2020	933		18.7%
U.S. Decennial Census

As of the census of 2000, there were 632 people, 241 households, and 159 families residing in the city. The population density was 665.3 inhabitants per square mile (256.9/km^{2}). There were 269 housing units at an average density of 283.2 per square mile (109.3/km^{2}). The racial makeup of the city was 94.94% White, 2.85% African American, 0.16% Asian, 0.95% from other races, and 1.11% from two or more races. Hispanic or Latino of any race were 1.27% of the population.

There were 241 households, out of which 28.2% had children under the age of 18 living with them, 53.9% were married couples living together, 9.5% had a female householder with no husband present, and 34.0% were non-families. 32.8% of all households were made up of individuals, and 13.7% had someone living alone who was 65 years of age or older. The average household size was 2.28 and the average family size was 2.89.

In the city, the population was spread out, with 20.4% under the age of 18, 9.8% from 18 to 24, 32.4% from 25 to 44, 23.3% from 45 to 64, and 14.1% who were 65 years of age or older. The median age was 36 years. For every 100 females, there were 107.9 males. For every 100 females age 18 and over, there were 114.0 males.

The median income for a household in the city was $32,500, and the median income for a family was $40,000. Males had a median income of $33,491 versus $19,063 for females. The per capita income for the city was $16,411. About 5.2% of families and 8.6% of the population were below the poverty line, including 7.6% of those under age 18 and 7.4% of those age 65 or over.

== Education ==
Webster County School District operates public schools.

Dixon Elementary School serves students from grades PreSchool-6. Before the 2014–15 school year, the Elementary School served students from grades PreSchool-8 until the Middle School was opened. Webster County Middle School serves students from grades 7 and 8. Webster County High School serves 680 students from grades 9 to 12. The High School, Middle School, and Elementary School are connected by and share a cafeteria known as the Webster County Annex.

Dixon has a lending library, a branch of the Webster County Public Library.

== Notable people ==
- Amy Slaton-Lovvorn and Tammy Slaton, subjects of the TLC show 1000-lb Sisters.
