= National Register of Historic Places listings in Union County, Kentucky =

Location of Union County in Kentucky

This is a list of the National Register of Historic Places listings in Union County, Kentucky.

The locations of National Register properties for which the latitude and longitude coordinates are included below, may be seen in a map.

There are 7 properties listed on the National Register in the county.

This National Park Service list is complete through NPS recent listings posted March 21, 2025.

== Current listings ==
	Name on the Register	Image	Date listed	Location	City or town	Description
1	Camp Breckinridge Non-Commissioned Officers' Club	Camp Breckinridge Non-Commissioned Officers' Club	August 14, 2001 (#01000804)	1116 N. Village Rd. 37°40′40″N 87°53′19″W	Morganfield	
2	Confederate Monument of Morganfield	Confederate Monument of Morganfield	July 17, 1997 (#97000666)	Junction of W. O'Bannon and S. Townsend Sts. in the city cemetery 37°41′04″N 87°55′15″W	Morganfield	
3	Daniel H. Hughes House	Daniel H. Hughes House	May 27, 1980 (#80001673)	213 W. O'Bannon St. 37°41′01″N 87°55′07″W	Morganfield	
4	Morganfield Commercial District	Morganfield Commercial District	July 19, 1984 (#84002063)	Main, Court, and Morgan Sts. 37°41′03″N 87°55′01″W	Morganfield	
5	George N. Proctor House	George N. Proctor House	October 1, 1990 (#90001488)	Kentucky Route 1180 east of its junction with Proctor Rd. 37°43′17″N 87°50′16″W	Waverly	
6	Saline Island	Saline Island	October 30, 1998 (#98001291)	Ohio River, miles 865-67, on the Illinois side 37°34′49″N 88°08′02″W	Curlew	
7	Union County Courthouse	Union County Courthouse	November 17, 1978 (#78001401)	Main St. 37°41′02″N 87°55′02″W	Morganfield	

== See also ==
- List of National Historic Landmarks in Kentucky
- National Register of Historic Places listings in Kentucky
