= Kentucky Route 1508 =

Highway in Kentucky

Kentucky Route 1508
- Route 1508 highlighted in purple

Route information
- Maintained by KYTC
- Length: 7.565 mi (12.175 km)
- Existed: c. 1967–present

Major junctions
- South end: KY 109 near Sturgis
- North end: KY 109 northwest of Sturgis

Location
- Country: United States
- State: Kentucky
- Counties: Union

Highway system
- Kentucky State Highway System; Interstate; US; State; Parkways
← KY 1507	→ KY 1509

Kentucky Route 1508 (KY 1508) is a state highway located in northwestern Kentucky. The route starts at KY 109, west of Sturgis. It travels westward to unincorporated area of Caseyville, and turns north near the Ohio River. KY 1508 then travels through the community of Dekoven, before ending at KY 109, northwest of its southern terminus. The route was designated around 1967, after the KY 130 designation was removed from the section in Caseyville, which was connected to the community since 1939.

== Route description ==
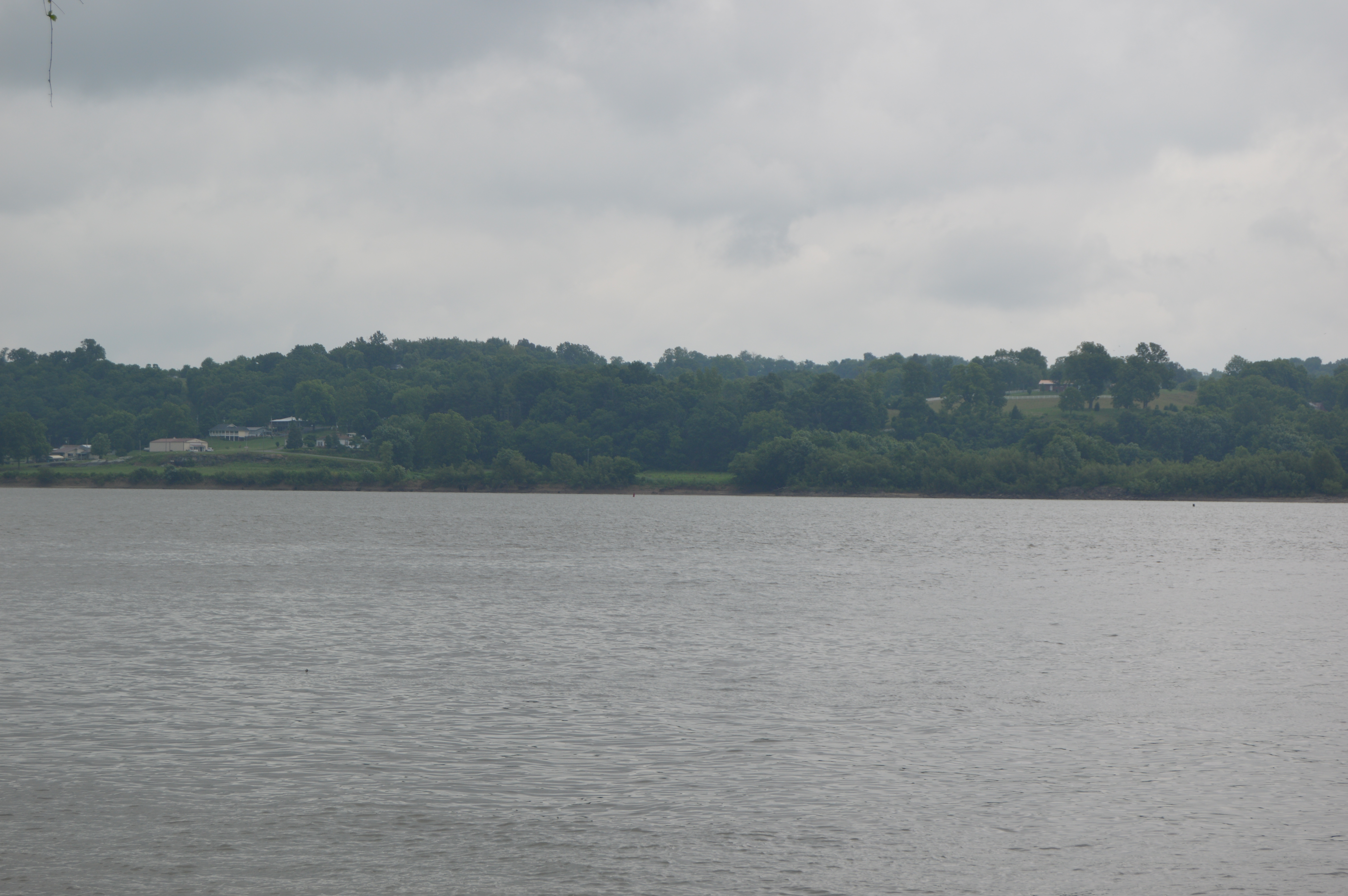
Caseyville, viewed from Battery Rock

All of the route is located inside Union County. In 2017, the Kentucky Transportation Cabinet (KYTC) calculated as many as 277 vehicles, including 17 trucks traveling on KY 1508 west of Locust Lick Road, and as few as 72 vehicles, including 16 trucks traveling north of Lawyer Loop. This is expressed in terms of annual average daily traffic (AADT), a measure of traffic volume for any average day of the year. KY 1508 is part of the Rural Secondary System of the State Primary Road System.

KY 1508 starts at a three-way junction at KY 109 west of the city of Sturgis and travels southwestwards. The road travels through farmland, and it intersects Tradewater Road, which leads to state maintained KY 923. It then borders the Big Rivers Wildlife Management Area and State Forest, with one entrance at Locust Lick Road. The road then crosses over an unnamed stream near Lover's Lane Road. At Caseyville Cemetery Road, the state forest no longer borders the route. KY 1508 reaches the center of the unincorporated area of Caseyville near Hill Street. A source of sand and gravel for KYTC Division of Materials is located off KY 1508 and Bell Tip Road. Right after the intersection at Bell Tip Road, an entrance to the Union County Boat Ramp is located to the south side of the road. KY 1508 turns sharply north at Brooks Street, and travels toward the unincorporated area of Mulfordtown, parallel to the Ohio River. The road travels through the center of the community, centered north of the western terminus of Caseyville Cemetery Road.

The route enters a small forest and crosses over a few unnamed streams, before entering a small stretch of farmland. The road intersects Berry Stevens Road and Lyman Road near Dekoven. Past Lyman Road, KY 1508 becomes concurrent with KY 492 as it continues northward, although KY 492 is unsigned past the intersection at KY 1508. The concurrency ends at KY 667 0.097 miles (0.156 km) later, as the southern terminus of KY 492 is located at the intersection. KY 1508 travels northeastward and uphill past houses after intersecting KY 667. The road soon re-emerges into the large tracts of farmland, intersecting Rhem Road south of its terminus. The route ends at KY 109 at a T-intersection soon afterwards.

== History ==
Since 1939, Caseyville was connected to the state highway system by KY 130, which was also concurrent with KY 85 north of the town. By 1957, the section of KY 130 from Caseyville to KY 85 was paved in asphalt, and KY 85 was renumbered to KY 109 about five years later. KY 130 was truncated to KY 109 near Henshaw in 1966, and the KY 1508 designation appeared on the state map the year after. The route was officially designated on September 26, 1980, as part of Official Order 85592, with an extension northwards to a new terminus at KY 109 near Dekoven.

== Major intersections ==
The entire route is in Union County.

Location	mi	km	Destinations	Notes
	0.000	0.000	KY 109	Southern terminus
	0.425	0.684	Tradewater Road to KY 923	
	6.285	10.115	KY 492	0.097-mile (0.156 km) concurrency with KY 492
	6.285	10.115	KY 492 / KY 667	0.097-mile (0.156 km) concurrency with KY 492
	7.565	12.175	KY 109	Northern terminus
1.000 mi = 1.609 km; 1.000 km = 0.621 mi
