= Tradewater River =

River in Kentucky, United States

Coordinates: 37.505326°N 88.056971°W

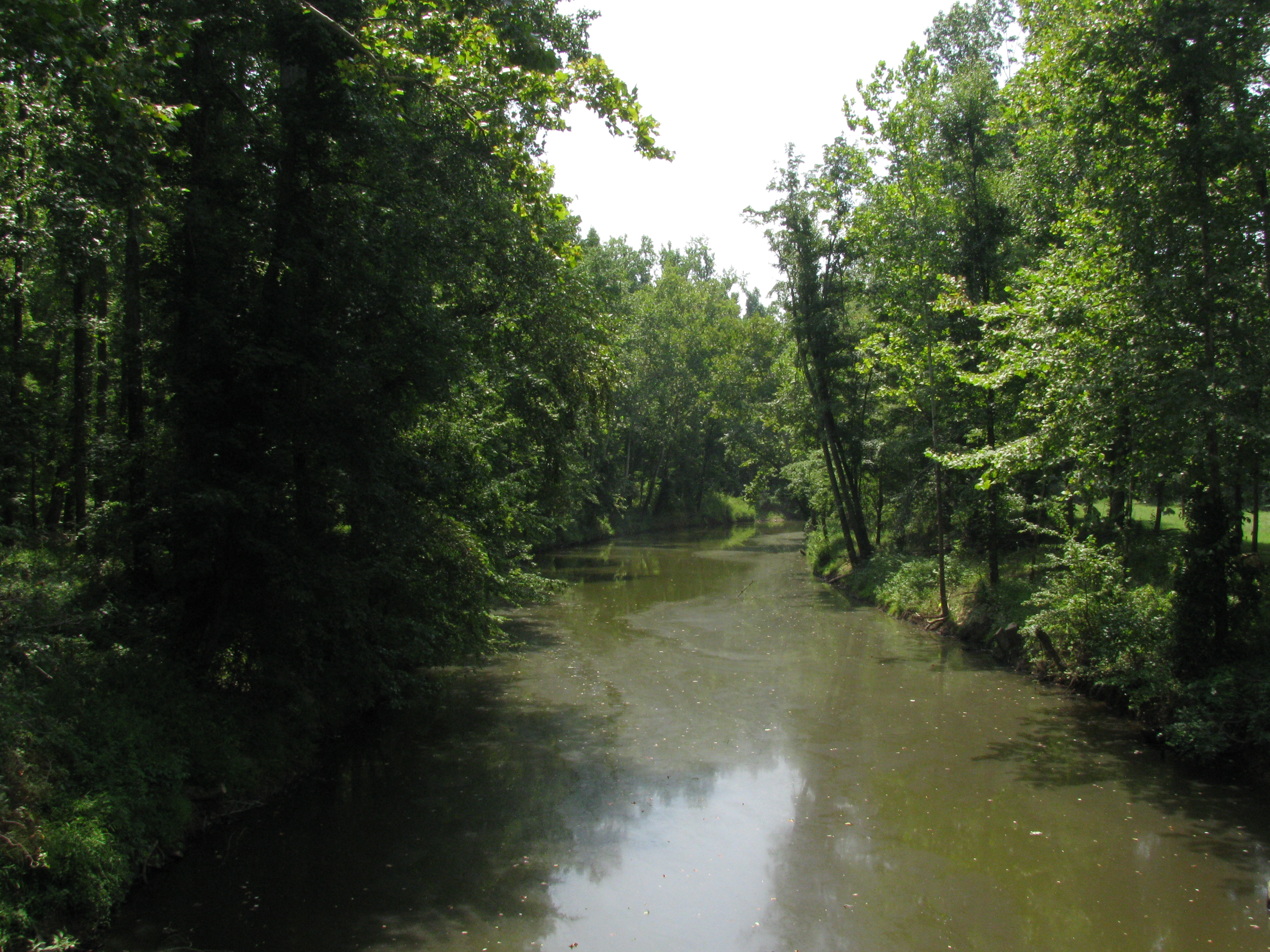
Tradewater River in Dawson Springs, Kentucky

The Tradewater River is a tributary of the Ohio River, approximately 136 miles (219 km) long, in western Kentucky in the United States. It drains an area of 932 square miles (2,410 km^{2}) in the limestone hills south of Evansville, Indiana, between the basins of the Cumberland River on the west and the Green River on the east.

== Description ==
It rises in northern Christian County, approximately 8 miles (13 km) north of Hopkinsville. It flows generally northwest in a tight meandering course, past Pennyrile Forest State Resort Park, where a tributary is impounded to form Lake Beshear just upstream from its mouth on the Tradewater. It flows past Dawson Springs and joins the Ohio from the southeast approximately 5 miles (8 km) southwest of Sturgis.

At Providence, the Tradewater has a mean annual discharge of 1,070 cubic feet per second.

The river has a low gradient with a gentle flow along much of its course. It forms a rough boundary between the Shawnee Hills physiographic region to the northeast and the Pennyroyal physiographic region to the southwest. The Shawnee Hills region is underlain by Pennsylvanian limestone, sandstone, and shale which contain deposits of coal. The Pennyroyal region, which is drained by tributaries of the upper Tradewater, is a dissected upland plateau underlain by Mississippian limestone bedrock.

By 1990, heavy mining activity in the region had filled the river with silt.

== See also ==
- List of rivers of Kentucky
