= Kentucky Route 56 =

State highway in Kentucky, United States

Kentucky Route 56
- KY 56 highlighted in red

Route information
- Maintained by KYTC
- Length: 61.503 mi (98.979 km)

Major junctions
- West end: IL 13 near Old Shawneetown, IL
- US 60 in Morganfield; US 41 Alt. in Webster County; US 41 in Sebree; I-69 near Sebree
- East end: KY 81 near Owensboro

Location
- Country: United States
- State: Kentucky
- Counties: Union, Webster, McLean, Daviess

Highway system
- Kentucky State Highway System; Interstate; US; State; Parkways
← KY 55	→ KY 57

Kentucky Route 56 (KY 56) is a 61.503-mile-long (98.979 km) state highway in Kentucky that runs from Illinois Route 13 (IL 13) near Old Shawneetown, Illinois, on the Shawneetown Bridge at the Kentucky-Illinois state line to KY 81 near Owensboro via Morgantown and Sebree.

== Major intersections ==
County	Location	mi	km	Destinations	Notes
Ohio River		0.000	0.000	IL 13 west	Continuation into Illinois
Ohio River		0.020– 0.630	0.032– 1.014	Shawneetown Bridge	
Union		0.870	1.400	KY 667	
Union		2.723	4.382	KY 109 south – Sturgis	Northern terminus of KY 109
Union		5.396	8.684	KY 2834 south	Northern terminus of KY 2834
Union	Spring Grove	6.608	10.635	KY 1598 north	Southern terminus of KY 1598
Union		7.812	12.572	KY 360 east	Western terminus of KY 360
Union		11.119	17.894	KY 1594 north	Southern terminus of KY 1594
Union		11.500	18.507	KY 3393 south / KY 56 Truck east to US 60 Byp. – James D. Veatch Camp Breckinridge Museum, Higginson Henry Wildlife Area, Moffit Lake Recreation Area, Gumz Farms	Morganfield bypass; western terminus of KY 56 truck route
Union	Morganfield	12.308	19.808	KY 947 west	Eastern terminus of KY 947
Union	Morganfield	12.415	19.980	KY 130 south (South Chapman Street)	Western end of KY 130 overlap
Union	Morganfield	13.075	21.042	US 60 / KY 130 north (Morgan Street)	Eastern end of KY 130 overlap; 130 turns north to follow 60 East
Union		14.011	22.549	US 60 Byp. / US 60 Truck / KY 56 Truck west – Shawneetown Bridge, James D. Veatch Camp Breckinridge Museum	Eastern terminus of KY 56 truck route; bridge to the west
Union		15.810	25.444	KY 2091 north	Southern terminus of KY 2091
Union		15.974	25.708	KY 758 south	Northern terminus of KY 758
Union	Boxville	19.637	31.603	KY 141 – Higginson Henry Wildlife Area, Moffit Lake Recreation Area	
Union		20.326	32.712	KY 983 south	Northern terminus of KY 983
Webster		28.506	45.876	US 41 Alt. south – Madisonville	Southern end of US 41 Alt. concurrency
Webster		30.010	48.296	KY 2839 south	Northern terminus of KY 2839
Webster	Poole	32.435	52.199	US 41 Alt. north / KY 145 north	Northern end of US 41 Alt. concurrency; southern terminus of KY 145
Webster		36.354	58.506	KY 283	
Webster	Sebree	39.373	63.365	KY 139 west (Dean Lane)	Eastern terminus of KY 139
Webster	Sebree	39.583	63.703	KY 359 south / US 41 south (College Street)	Southern end of US 41 concurrency; northern terminus of KY 359
Webster	Sebree	39.798	64.049	US 41 north	Northern end of US 41 concurrency
Webster		41.360– 41.644	66.562– 67.020	I-69 – Madisonville, Henderson	I-69 exit 134
Webster		41.933– 41.999	67.485– 67.591	Corporal James B. Grisham Commemorative bridge over Green River	
McLean	Beech Grove	47.328	76.167	KY 256 east	Western terminus of KY 256
McLean	Beech Grove	47.515	76.468	KY 136 east (Main Street)	Western terminus of KY 136
McLean		48.164	77.512	KY 1233 north	Southern terminus of KY 1233
McLean		49.021	78.892	KY 258 east	Western terminus of KY 258
McLean	Elba	50.872	81.871	KY 593	
Daviess		54.204	87.233	KY 258 west	Eastern terminus of KY 258
Daviess	Saint Joseph	54.565	87.814	KY 500 north (Cummings Road)	Southern terminus of KY 500
Daviess		56.619	91.119	KY 815 east – West Louisville	Western terminus of KY 815
Daviess		59.612	95.936	KY 456 west	Eastern terminus of KY 456
Daviess	Sorgho	61.586	99.113	KY 1554 north to Audubon Parkway – Owensboro, Henderson	Southern terminus of KY 1554
Daviess		62.415	100.447	KY 279 north	Western end of KY 279 overlap
Daviess		63.422	102.068	KY 279 south	Eastern end of KY 279 overlap
Daviess		65.647	105.649	KY 81 (Calhoun Road / West Parrish Avenue) – Calhoun, Owensboro	Eastern terminus of KY 56; roundabout
1.000 mi = 1.609 km; 1.000 km = 0.621 mi: Concurrency terminus
