= Uniontown, Kentucky =

- City
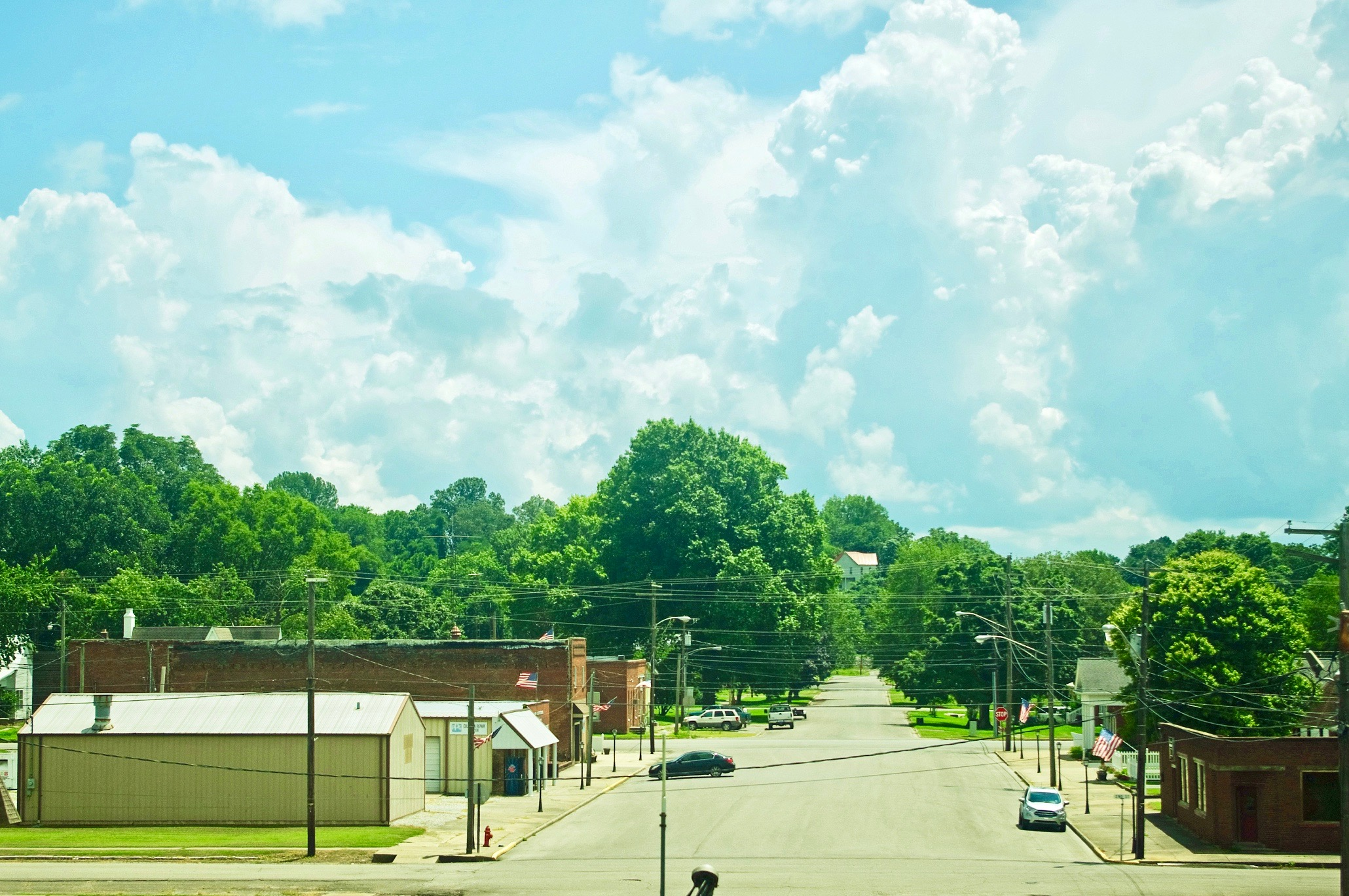
- Main Street

- Location of Uniontown in Union County, Kentucky.
- Coordinates: 37°46′20″N 87°55′55″W
- Country: United States
- State: Kentucky
- County: Union

Area
  - Total: 0.94 sq mi (2.44 km^{2})
  - Land: 0.85 sq mi (2.20 km^{2})
  - Water: 0.093 sq mi (0.24 km^{2})
- Elevation: 364 ft (111 m)

Population (2020)
  - Total: 929
  - Density: 1,092.5/sq mi (421.83/km^{2})
- Time zone: UTC-6 (Central (CST))
  - Summer (DST): UTC-5 (CDT)
- ZIP code: 42461
- Area code: 270
- FIPS code: 21-78492
- GNIS feature ID: 0505827

Uniontown is a home rule-class city in Union County, Kentucky, United States. The population was 929 at the 2020 census. The John T. Myers Locks and Dam, once known as Uniontown Locks and Dam, is located downriver 3½ miles.

== History ==
The name "Uniontown" derives from the fact that the city was formed by merging the towns of Francisburg and Locust Port in 1840. A post office with the new name opened in 1842.

The Uniontown levee, built in response to the Ohio River flood of 1937, was completed in 1951.

== Geography ==
Uniontown is located at 37°46′20″N 87°55′55″W (37.772281, -87.931890). The city is situated along the Ohio River, at its confluence with Highland Creek. A levee protects the city from flooding along the river up to a river level of 66 feet (20 m). Kentucky Route 130 and Kentucky Route 360 intersect in downtown Uniontown. KY 130 crosses the levee, connecting the city with the Uniontown Ferry Boat Dock along the river.

According to the United States Census Bureau, the city has a total area of 1.0 square mile (2.6 km^{2}), of which 0.9 square miles (2.3 km^{2}) is land and 0.1 square miles (0.26 km^{2}) (7.29%) is water.

The Henderson Sloughs, a National Natural Landmark, are located on the county line east of Uniontown.

== Demographics ==
Historical population
Census	Pop.	Note	%±
1860	1,046		—
1870	896		−14.3%
1880	1,015		13.3%
1890	1,037		2.2%
1900	1,532		47.7%
1910	1,356		−11.5%
1920	1,094		−19.3%
1930	1,235		12.9%
1940	1,327		7.4%
1950	1,054		−20.6%
1960	1,255		19.1%
1970	1,255		0.0%
1980	1,169		−6.9%
1990	1,008		−13.8%
2000	1,064		5.6%
2010	1,002		−5.8%
2020	929		−7.3%
U.S. Decennial Census

As of the census of 2000, there were 1,064 people, 445 households, and 300 families residing in the city. The population density was 1,192.9 inhabitants per square mile (460.6/km^{2}). There were 482 housing units at an average density of 540.4 per square mile (208.6/km^{2}). The racial makeup of the city was 91.54% White, 7.61% African American, 0.19% Native American, 0.09% Asian, and 0.56% from two or more races. Hispanic or Latino of any race were 0.38% of the population.

There were 445 households, out of which 33.7% had children under the age of 18 living with them, 45.8% were married couples living together, 16.0% had a female householder with no husband present, and 32.4% were non-families. 30.6% of all households were made up of individuals, and 13.9% had someone living alone who was 65 years of age or older. The average household size was 2.39 and the average family size was 2.95.

In the city, the population was spread out, with 26.6% under the age of 18, 9.9% from 18 to 24, 28.9% from 25 to 44, 21.5% from 45 to 64, and 13.1% who were 65 years of age or older. The median age was 35 years. For every 100 females, there were 95.2 males. For every 100 females age 18 and over, there were 89.1 males.

The median income for a household in the city was $26,700, and the median income for a family was $31,146. Males had a median income of $24,408 versus $18,235 for females. The per capita income for the city was $13,258. About 15.3% of families and 18.2% of the population were below the poverty line, including 28.0% of those under age 18 and 15.2% of those age 65 or over.

== Education ==
Uniontown is served by the Union County Public Schools, Kentucky. Elementary students attend Uniontown Elementary. Middle and High School students attend Union County Middle School & Union County High School outside Morganfield.

Uniontown has a lending library, a branch of the Union County Public Library.

== See also ==
- List of cities in Kentucky
- List of cities and towns along the Ohio River
