= Pennyrile State Forest =

State forest in Kentucky, United States

- Interactive map of Pennyrile State Forest
- Nearest city: Hopkinsville, Kentucky
- Coordinates: 37°4′20.28″N 87°40′11.9999″W
- Area: 15,468 acres (6,260 ha)
- Established: 1930
- Governing body: Department of Natural Resources, Division of Forests

Pennyrile State Forest is a state forest in Christian County, Kentucky, United States. It contains Pennyrile Forest State Resort Park and borders Lake Beshear. It is managed for sustainable timber production.
