= Kentucky Route 359 =

State highway in Kentucky, United States

Kentucky Route 359
- KY 359 highlighted in red

Route information
- Maintained by KYTC
- Length: 11.623 mi (18.705 km)

Major junctions
- South end: US 60 in Morganfield
- KY 141 northeast of Morganfield; KY 360 near Hitesville
- North end: KY 136 in Smith Mills

Location
- Country: United States
- State: Kentucky
- Counties: Union, Henderson

Highway system
- Kentucky State Highway System; Interstate; US; State; Parkways
← KY 358	→ KY 360

Kentucky Route 359 (KY 359) is a 11.623-mile-long (18.705 km) state highway in the U.S. state of Kentucky. The highway connects rural areas of Union and Henderson counties with Morganfield and Smith Mills.

== Route description ==
KY 359 begins at an intersection with U.S. Route 60 (US 60) in the northeastern part of Morganfield, within Union County. It travels to the northeast and leaves the city. It crosses over Lost Creek and Higginson Ditch and then intersects KY 141. It passes Highland Cemetery just before it begins a one-block concurrency with KY 1180. Then, the highway curves to the north-northeast. It curves back to the northeast and crosses over Little Mason Creek. Just over 500 feet (150 m) later, it intersects the northern terminus of KY 1179. Just under 0.5 miles (0.80 km) later is an intersection with the eastern terminus of KY 360. It then crosses over Highland Creek. The highway curves to the east-northeast and enters Henderson County. KY 359 curves back to the northeast and crosses over an unnamed stream. It passes Smith Mills Cemetery before it enters Smith Mills. There, it meets its northern terminus, an intersection with KY 136 (Alzey–Mt. Vernon Road).

== Major intersections ==
County	Location	mi	km	Destinations	Notes
Union	Morganfield	0.000	0.000	US 60 – Sturgis, Henderson	Southern terminus
Union		2.909	4.682	KY 141	
Union		4.473	7.199	KY 1180 north	Southern end of KY 1180 concurrency
Union		4.544	7.313	KY 1180 south	Northern end of KY 1180 concurrency
Union		6.320	10.171	KY 1179 south	Northern terminus of KY 1179
Union		6.806	10.953	KY 360 west	Eastern terminus of KY 360
Henderson	Smith Mills	11.623	18.705	KY 136 (Alzey–Mt. Vernon Road)	Northern terminus
1.000 mi = 1.609 km; 1.000 km = 0.621 mi: Concurrency terminus
