= Union County Public Schools =

Union County Public Schools may refer to:

- Union County Public Schools of Union County, Kentucky
- Union County Public Schools of Union County, North Carolina
- Union County Public Schools of Union County, Tennessee
