= Kentucky Route 130 =

State highway in Kentucky, United States

Kentucky Route 130
- KY 130 highlighted in red

Route information
- Maintained by KYTC
- Length: 20.986 mi (33.774 km)

Major junctions
- South end: KY 109 / KY 1257 near Sturgis
- KY 56 in Morganfield; US 60 in Morganfield
- North end: Uniontown Ferry in Uniontown

Location
- Country: United States
- State: Kentucky
- Counties: Union

Highway system
- Kentucky State Highway System; Interstate; US; State; Parkways
← KY 129	→ KY 131

Kentucky Route 130 (KY 130) is a 17.013-mile (27.380 km) state highway in Union County, Kentucky, United States, that travels from KY 109 and KY 1257 northwest of Sturgis to the Uniontown Ferry on the Ohio River in Uniontown via Morganfield.

== Major intersections ==
The entire route is in Union County.

Location	mi	km	Destinations	Notes
	0.000	0.000	KY 109 / KY 1257 west	Southern terminus; continues as KY 1257
	0.550	0.885	KY 2834 north	Southern terminus of KY 2834
	1.308	2.105	KY 270 east	Western terminus of KY 270
	3.218	5.179	KY 2101 south	Northern terminus of KY 2101
	8.743	14.070	KY 3393	
Morganfield	9.584	15.424	KY 56 west (West Main Street) / North Chapman Street	South end of KY 56 overlap
Morganfield	10.244	16.486	US 60 west (South Morgan Street) / KY 56 east (East Main Street)	North end of KY 56 overlap; south end of US 60 overlap
Morganfield	10.581	17.028	US 60 east (North Morgan Street)	North end of US 60 overlap
	13.522	21.762	KY 948 south	Northern terminus of KY 948
	13.670	22.000	KY 666 west	Eastern terminus of KY 666
	15.077	24.264	KY 141 south	Northern terminus of KY 141
Uniontown	16.654	26.802	KY 360 (Third Street)	
Uniontown	17.013	27.380	Uniontown Ferry	Northern terminus
1.000 mi = 1.609 km; 1.000 km = 0.621 mi: Concurrency terminus

== See also ==
- List of state highways in Kentucky
