= List of National Natural Landmarks in Kentucky =

There are 7 National Natural Landmarks in Kentucky. One is shared with Indiana.

Kentucky National Natural Landmarks (clickable map)

| Name | Image | Date | Location | County | Ownership | Description |
|---|---|---|---|---|---|---|
| Creelsboro Natural Bridge | Red River Gorge | 1987 | 36.884992°N 85.236425°W | Russell | Private | An outstanding illustration of subterranean stream diversion. |
| Henderson Sloughs | | 1974 | 37.860445°N 87.780100°W | Henderson, Union | State (Dept. of Fish & Wildlife) | One of the largest wetlands remaining in Kentucky |
| Lilley Cornett Woods | | 1971 | 37.087865°N 82.992453°W | Letcher | State (Eastern Kentucky University) | Virgin tract of mixed mesophytic forest. |
| Red River Gorge | Red River Gorge | 1975 | 37.833889°N 83.607778°W | Menifee, Powell, Wolfe | Federal (Daniel Boone National Forest) | Contains examples of many geological formations, including 41 natural bridges. |
| Rock Creek Research Natural Area | | 1975 | 37.288056°N 83.875278°W | Laurel | Federal (Daniel Boone National Forest) | One of the few virgin hemlock hardwood forests remaining in Kentucky. |
| Big Bone Lick | | 2009 | 38.886944°N 84.747778°W | Boone | State (Big Bone Lick State Park) | Combination of salt springs and associated Late Pleistocene bone beds. Also on the mighty Ohio River. |
| Ohio Coral Reef | | 1966 | 38.27665°N 85.76544°W | Jefferson | Federal (Falls of the Ohio National Wildlife Conservation Area) | A classic example of a Silurian and Devonian coral community. Extends into Indiana. |

== See also ==
- List of National Historic Landmarks in Kentucky
