= Shawneetown Bridge =

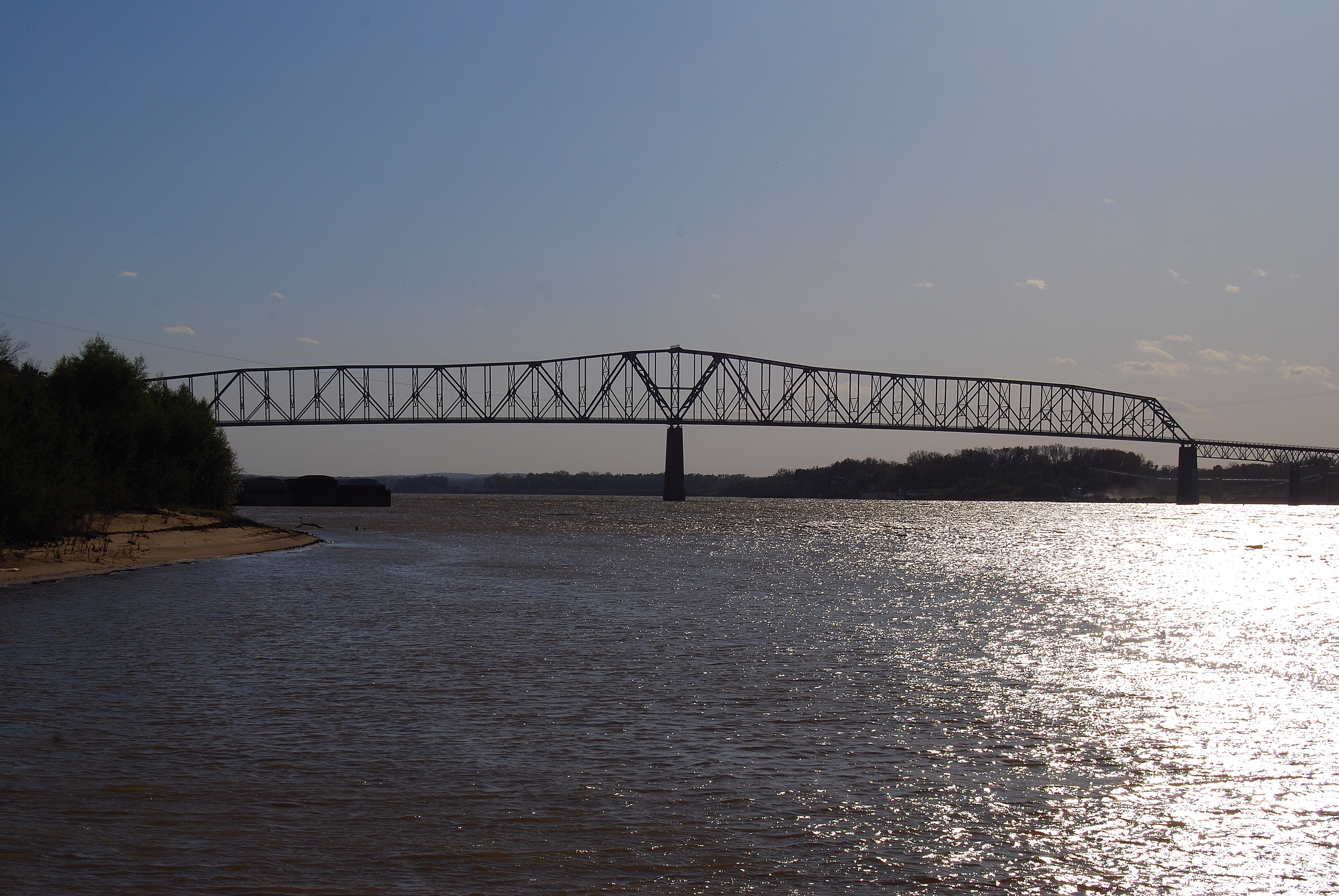
- Coordinates: 37°41′28″N 88°07′53″W
- Carries: IL 13 / KY 56
- Crosses: Ohio River
- Locale: Old Shawneetown, Illinois and Union County, Kentucky
- Official name: Earle C. Clements Bridge
- Maintained by: Kentucky Transportation Cabinet

Characteristics
- Design: Cantilevered truss bridge
- Total length: 3,200.2 feet (975.4 m)
- Width: 23.9 feet (7.3 m)
- Longest span: 825.1 feet (251.5 m)
- Clearance above: 19.0 feet (5.8 m)

History
- Opened: 1955

Statistics
- Daily traffic: 2,800

The Earle C. Clements Bridge, commonly known as the Shawneetown Bridge, is a cantilever truss bridge carrying Kentucky Route 56 and Illinois Route 13 across the Ohio River. Clements was governor of Kentucky in 1947–50 and U.S. senator in 1950–56. The bridge connects Old Shawneetown, Illinois, to rural Union County, Kentucky, where Clements was born, raised and held local office. Opened in 1955, it is the only highway bridge over the Ohio between Paducah, Kentucky, and Evansville, Indiana. Tolls were removed from the bridge June 30, 1978.

The Shawneetown Bridge was featured in a scene in the film U.S. Marshals. The film's crash scene was filmed several miles downstream in Pope County, Illinois.
