= Morganfield Commercial District =

Historic district in Kentucky, United States

- U.S. National Register of Historic Places
- U.S. Historic district
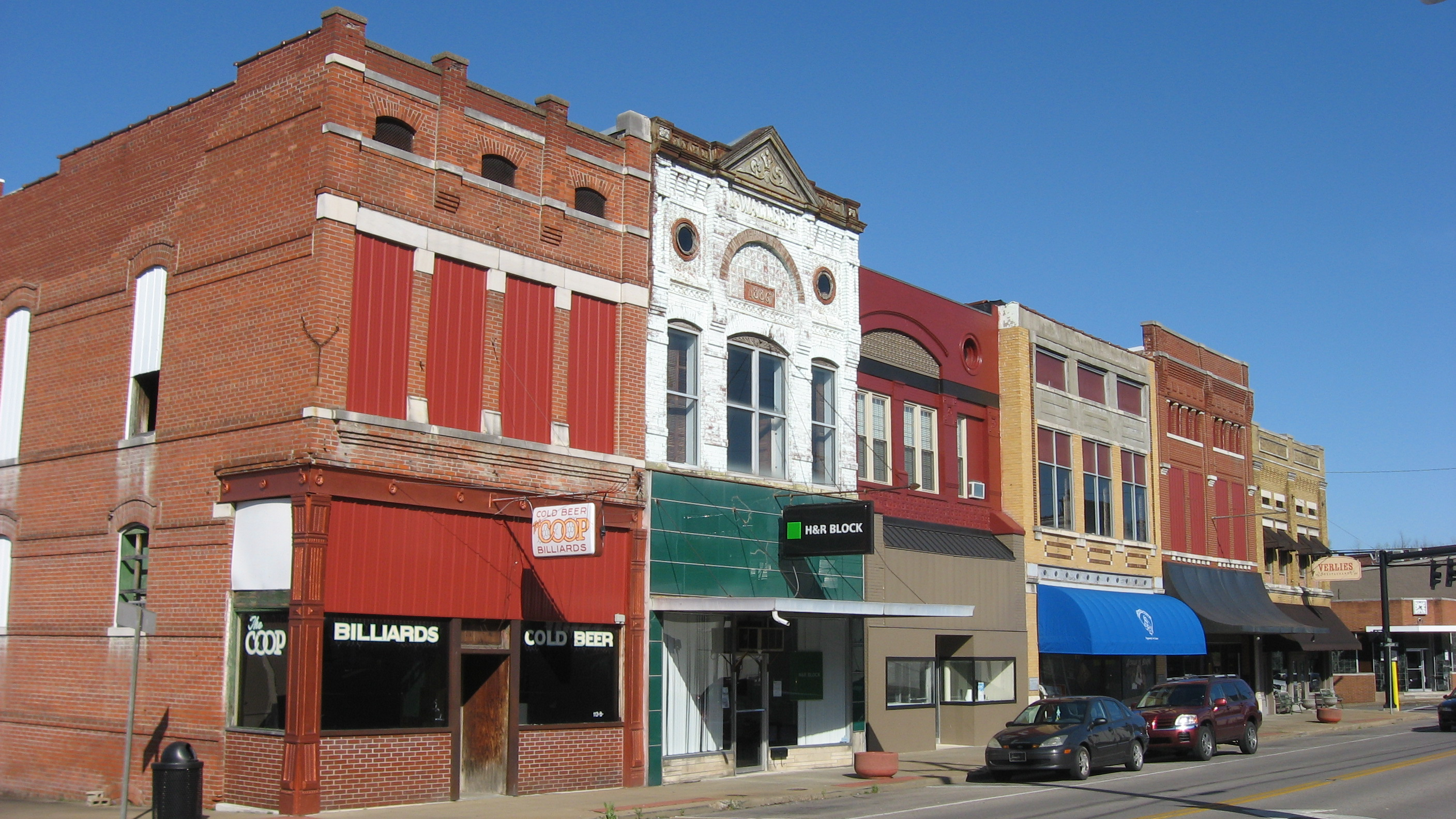

- Location within Kentucky Location within the United States
- Location: Main, Court, and Morgan Sts., Morganfield, Kentucky
- Coordinates: 37°41′03″N 87°55′01″W
- Area: 6 acres (2.4 ha)
- Built: 1872
- NRHP reference No.: 84002063
- Added to NRHP: July 19, 1984

The Morganfield Commercial District is a 6 acres (2.4 ha) historic district in Morganfield, Kentucky which was listed on the National Register of Historic Places in 1984.

It includes parts of Main, Court, and Morgan Streets. It included 30 contributing buildings. It is "a cohesive group of late 19th and early 20th Century commercial structures. Although most are vernacular in style, together the buildings form a tightly knit collection, which is impressive in its variety. The historic commercial area came to maturity during the period between 1870 and 1930, a time of significant growth and development in Union County. This collection of buildings is representative of that important point in time."

Included in the district are:

- Union County Courthouse, which is separately listed on the National Register.
- J.K. Waller Building, an elaborately detailed two and one-half story building with terra cotta trim and a metal cornice
- old National Bank of Union County building
