= Larry Johnson (basketball, born 1954) =

American basketball player (1954–2025)

Personal information
- Born: November 28, 1954 Morganfield, Kentucky, U.S.
- Died: April 29, 2025 (aged 70) Mount Vernon, Kentucky, U.S.
- Listed height: 6 ft 3 in (1.91 m)
- Listed weight: 205 lb (93 kg)

Career information
- High school: Union County (Morganfield, Kentucky)
- College: Kentucky (1973–1977)
- NBA draft: 1977: 2nd round, 24th overall pick
- Drafted by: Buffalo Braves
- Position: Shooting guard
- Number: 10

Career history
- 1977: Buffalo Braves
- 1979–1989: Matsushita Denki

Career highlights
- NIT champion (1976); Third-team All-SEC (1977)
- Stats at NBA.com
- Stats at Basketball Reference

Larry O'Neal Johnson Sr. (November 28, 1954 – April 29, 2025) was an American basketball player who had a brief career with the Buffalo Braves of the National Basketball Association (NBA). He played college basketball for the Kentucky Wildcats.

Johnson was a 6'3" shooting guard and played competitively at Union County High School in Morganfield, Kentucky, before attending the University of Kentucky from 1973 to 1977. He was the first of three African-Americans from Union County recruited by UK. At Kentucky, he was selected as All-SEC Third Team his senior season. He helped the Wildcats finish as runners-up in the 1975 NCAA Tournament to UCLA in coach John Wooden's last game, as well as becoming NIT champions in 1976 with a victory over UNC-Charlotte, in which he scored 16 points.

Johnson was selected in the second round of the 1977 NBA draft by the Buffalo Braves. He only played four games for them during the 1977–78 season, averaging 1.5 points per game. Johnson would go on to play internationally for many years, in Japan for Matsushita Denki, which later became known as the Panasonic Corporation, from 1979 to 1989. After he retired as a player, he also coached that team.

Johnson lived in Japan until 1990 before returning to the U.S. where he dedicated himself to raising his family and coaching youth sports in Lexington, Kentucky.

Johnson died in Mount Vernon, Kentucky on April 29, 2025, at the age of 70.

== Career statistics ==
Legend
GP	Games played	GS	Games started	MPG	Minutes per game
FG%	Field goal percentage	3P%	3-point field goal percentage	FT%	Free throw percentage
RPG	Rebounds per game	APG	Assists per game	SPG	Steals per game
BPG	Blocks per game	PPG	Points per game	**Bold**	Career high

=== NBA ===
==== Regular season ====
Year	Team	GP	MPG	FG%	FT%	RPG	APG	SPG	BPG	PPG
1977–78	Buffalo	4	9.5	.231	.000	1.3	1.8	1.3	.5	1.5
