= Kentucky Route 360 =

State highway in Kentucky, United States

Kentucky Route 360
- KY 360 highlighted in red

Route information
- Maintained by KYTC
- Length: 13.612 mi (21.906 km)

Major junctions
- West end: KY 56 near Spring Grove
- KY 871 northeast of Spring Grove; KY 871 southwest of Uniontown; KY 130 in Uniontown
- East end: KY 359 near Hitesville

Location
- Country: United States
- State: Kentucky
- Counties: Union

Highway system
- Kentucky State Highway System; Interstate; US; State; Parkways
← KY 359	→ KY 361

Kentucky Route 360 (KY 360) is a 13.612-mile-long (21.906 km) state highway in Union County, Kentucky, United States, that connects mostly rural areas of Union County with Uniontown.

== Route description ==
KY 360 begins at an intersection with KY 56 east-northeast of Spring Grove, within Union County. It travels to the north-northeast and intersects the southern terminus of KY 871. It curves to the northeast and crosses over a branch or Sugg Creek. It immediately begins paralleling this branch. Just after it leaves the branch, it has a very brief concurrency with KY 947 (Morganfield–Raleigh Road). KY 360 passes Rayburn Cemetery and Dozit Landfill before a concurrency with KY 666. After the concurrency ends, the highway heads to the north-northeast and intersects the northern terminus of KY 871. The highway curves to the east-northeast and travels under a conveyor for River View Coal. It crosses over Lost Creek and curves to the northeast. It enters Uniontown. It intersects KY 130 (Mill Street). The two highways serve as a truck route through the city. At Main Street, where the city hall is located, the highway is half a block southeast of a U.S. Post Office. It curves to the southeast and leaves the city. It passes Uniontown Cemetery and curves to the east. It crosses over Dry Fork Slough and curves to the east-northeast. KY 360 crosses over Dry Fork and curves to the east. After intersecting the southern terminus of KY 1637, it curves to the east-southeast. It continues to the southeast and meets its eastern terminus, an intersection with KY 359.

== Major intersections ==
The entire route is in Union County.

Location	mi	km	Destinations	Notes
	0.000	0.000	KY 56	Western terminus
	0.515	0.829	KY 871 north	Southern terminus of KY 871
	1.945	3.130	KY 947 west (Morganfield–Raleigh Road)	Western end of KY 947 concurrency
	1.993	3.207	KY 947 east	Eastern end of KY 947 concurrency
	4.880	7.854	KY 666 west	Western end of KY 666 concurrency
	5.083	8.180	KY 666 east	Eastern end of KY 666 concurrency
	5.482	8.822	KY 871 south	Northern terminus of KY 871
Uniontown	7.318	11.777	KY 130 (Mill Street)	
	11.119	17.894	KY 1637 north	Southern terminus of KY 1637
	13.612	21.906	KY 359	Eastern terminus
1.000 mi = 1.609 km; 1.000 km = 0.621 mi: Concurrency terminus

== See also ==
- List of state highways in Kentucky
