= Breckinridge Center, Kentucky =

Census-designated place in Kentucky, United States

- CDP
- Location within the state of Kentucky
- Coordinates: 37°40′46″N 87°51′58″W
- Country: United States
- State: Kentucky
- County: Union

Area
  - Total: 2.63 sq mi (6.80 km^{2})
  - Land: 2.63 sq mi (6.80 km^{2})
  - Water: 0.0039 sq mi (0.01 km^{2})
- Elevation: 433 ft (132 m)

Population (2020)
  - Total: 1,282
  - Density: 488.5/sq mi (188.61/km^{2})
- Time zone: UTC-6 (Central (CST))
  - Summer (DST): UTC-5 (CDT)
- FIPS code: 21-09379
- GNIS feature ID: 1867276

Breckinridge Center is a census-designated place (CDP) in Union County, Kentucky, United States. As of the 2020 census, Breckinridge Center had a population of 1,282. It is named for the Breckinridge Job Corps Center, now known as the Earle C. Clements Job Corps Center.

== History ==
Breckinridge Center was formerly home to Camp Breckinridge, a prisoner of war camp operated by the United States Armed Forces during World War II. It was later converted into the headquarters of the 506th Regiment of the 101st Airborne Division during the Korean War.

The camp was deactivated and was sold in 1965.

== Geography ==
Breckinridge Center is located at 37°40′46″N 87°51′58″W (37.679306, -87.866073).

According to the United States Census Bureau, the CDP has a total area of 5.6 square miles (15 km^{2}), all land.

== Demographics ==
Historical population
Census	Pop.	Note	%±
2020	1,282		—
U.S. Decennial Census

As of the census of 2000, there were 1,874 people, 250 households, and 182 families residing in the CDP. The population density was 335.2 inhabitants per square mile (129.4/km^{2}). There were 260 housing units at an average density of 46.5 per square mile (18.0/km^{2}). The racial makeup of the CDP was 41.36% White, 49.84% African American, 0.64% Native American, 0.32% Asian, 2.45% from other races, and 5.39% from two or more races. Hispanic or Latino of any race were 7.74% of the population.

There were 250 households, out of which 40.0% had children under the age of 18 living with them, 55.2% were married couples living together, 14.4% had a female householder with no husband present, and 27.2% were non-families. 22.0% of all households were made up of individuals, and 5.6% had someone living alone who was 65 years of age or older. The average household size was 2.73 and the average family size was 3.12.

In the CDP, the population was spread out, with 28.0% under the age of 18, 49.0% from 18 to 24, 12.5% from 25 to 44, 8.4% from 45 to 64, and 2.0% who were 65 years of age or older. The median age was 20 years. For every 100 females, there were 209.8 males. For every 100 females age 18 and over, there were 208.7 males.

The median income for a household in the CDP was $28,092, and the median income for a family was $30,238. Males had a median income of $18,920 versus $18,000 for females. The per capita income for the CDP was $6,761. About 5.2% of families and 57.4% of the population were below the poverty line, including 10.9% of those under age 18 and 20.0% of those age 65 or over.
