= George N. Proctor House =

- U.S. National Register of Historic Places
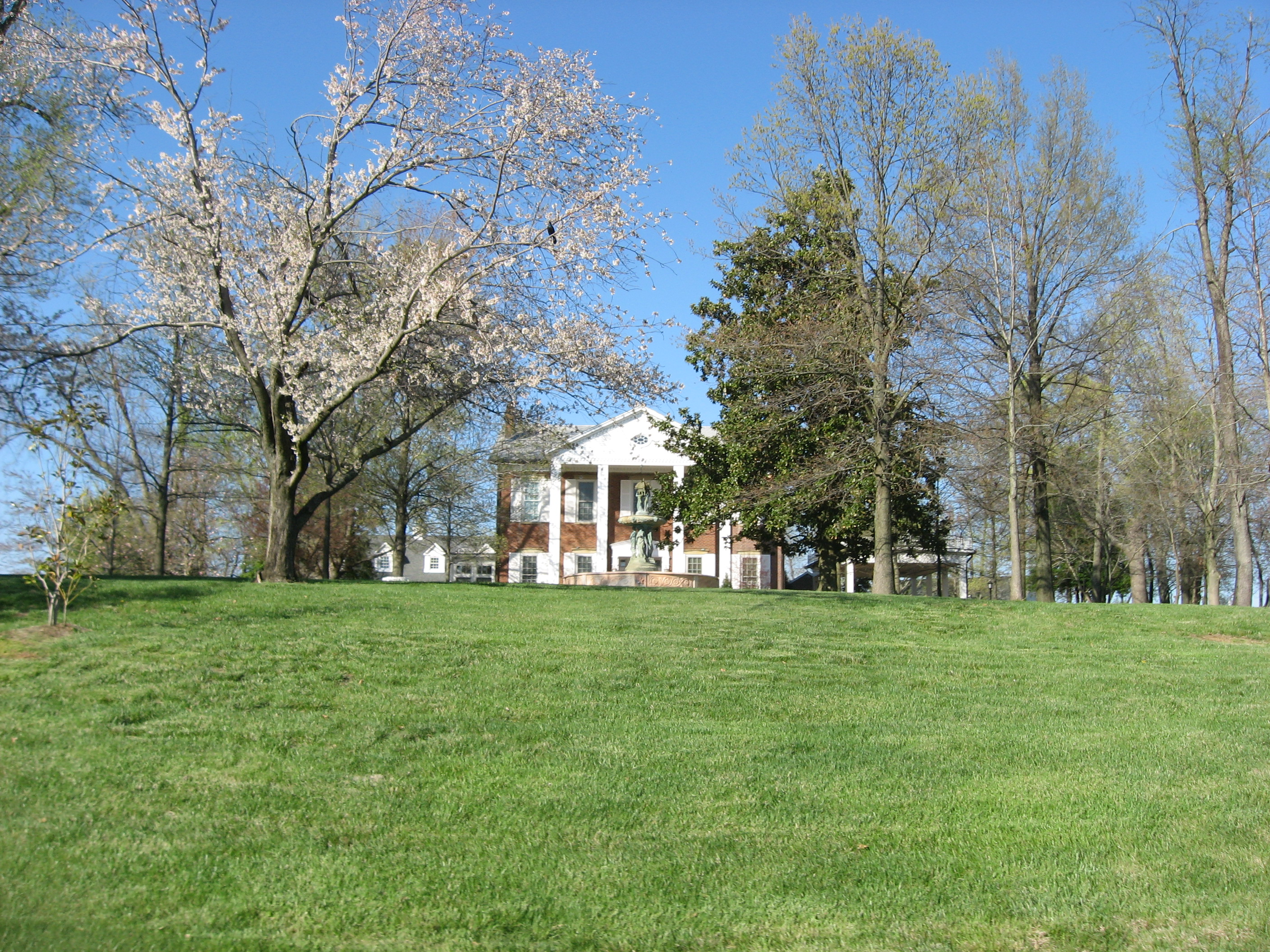

- Location within Kentucky Location within the United States
- Nearest city: Waverly, Kentucky
- Coordinates: 37°43′17″N 87°50′16″W
- Area: 1 acre (0.40 ha)
- Built: c.1854
- Architectural style: Greek Revival
- NRHP reference No.: 90001488
- Added to NRHP: October 1, 1990

The George N. Proctor House in Union County, Kentucky near Waverly, is an antebellum Greek Revival-style house built around 1854. It was listed on the National Register of Historic Places in 1990.

It is located on Kentucky Route 1180 east of its junction with Proctor Rd.

It is "a 2 1/2-story, double-pile Greek Revival house of brick common bond construction", upon a stone foundation.
