= Union County Public Schools, Kentucky =

School district in Union County, Kentucky

Union County Public Schools is a school district serving Union County, Kentucky. Communities served by the school district include Morganfield, Sturgis, Sullivan, Uniontown, Waverly and surrounding areas.

== Schools ==
=== Elementary schools ===
- Morganfield Elementary School
- Sturgis Elementary School
- Uniontown Elementary School

=== Middle schools ===
- Union County Middle School

=== High schools ===
- Union County High School

== Additional programs ==
- Union County Learning Academy
- Victory School
