= Bordley, Kentucky =

Unincorporated community in Kentucky, United States

Coordinates: 37°33′33″N 87°52′11″W

Bordley is an unincorporated community in Union County, in the U.S. state of Kentucky.

== History ==
A post office called Bordley was established in 1828, and remained in operation until 1911. A first settler named the community after one Mr. Bordley, a man he knew in England.
