= Nancy Huston Banks =

American journalist and novelist (1849–1934)

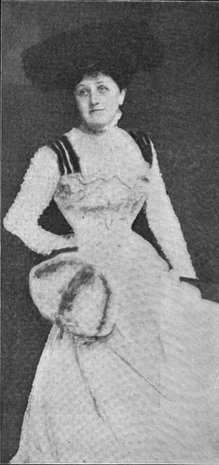
Nancy Huston Banks, in a 1905 publication.

Nancy Huston Banks (October 28, 1849 – April 6, 1934) was an American journalist, literary critic, and novelist from Kentucky.

== Early life ==
Nancy Huston was born at Morganfield, Kentucky, the daughter of George Huston, a judge, and Sallie Brady Huston. She was educated at the Convent of St. Vincent.

== Career ==
During the World's Columbian Exposition in Chicago in 1893, Banks was on the Board of Lady Managers, and worked for the fair as a writer and editor. Banks moved to New York to pursue a writing career in the early 1890s. She was on staff at The Bookman magazine in its first year as a book reviewer. She also lived in London for a time, and reported from South Africa during the Boer War for a London newspaper. For a time in November 1899, she was reported caught in the Siege of Kimberley, blockaded by the Boer army, in the company of Cecil Rhodes and fellow New Yorker Amalia Küssner, a miniaturist.

Nancy Huston Banks also wrote novels, including Stairs of Sand (1890), Oldfield: A Kentucky Tale of the Last Century (1902), Round Anvil Rock: A Romance (1903), and The Little Hills (1905). In reviewing the last title, Frederic Taber Cooper commented that "Few are so fortunate as Mrs. Banks in knowing the range and boundaries of their intellectual gardens, the thoughts and fancies that will best flower therein."

== Personal life ==
Nancy Huston married lawyer James N. Banks. She died in 1934 in Washington, D.C., aged 84.
