= Cullen, Kentucky =

Unincorporated community in Kentucky, United States

- Unincorporated community
- Location within Kentucky
- Coordinates: 37°35′22″N 87°52′41″W
- Country: United States
- State: Kentucky
- County: Union
- Elevation: 463 ft (141 m)
- Time zone: UTC-6 (Central (CST))
  - Summer (DST): UTC-5 (CDT)
- Area code: 270
- GNIS feature ID: 507792

Cullen is an unincorporated community in Union County, Kentucky, United States.

A post office in the community was established in 1885, and named for the first postmaster Joseph Cullen. That post office closed in 1906.
