= Henderson Sloughs =

Wetland segment of the Sloughs Wildlife Management Area in Kentucky

- Sloughs WMA
- Location within Kentucky
- Location: Henderson, Kentucky and Uniontown, Kentucky
- Coordinates: 37.8604°N 87.7801°W
- Area: 3,949 acres (1,598 ha)
- Established: 1974
- Governing body: Kentucky Department of Fish and Wildlife
- Website: app.fw.ky.gov/Public_Lands_Search/detail.aspx?Kdfwr_id=230

U.S. National Natural Landmark
- Designated: 1974

Henderson Sloughs is a 3,949-acre wetland segment of the Sloughs Wildlife Management Area, a state-owned and protected area of the U.S. state of Kentucky. Located in Henderson County, Kentucky and Union County, Kentucky, the overall protected area comprises 11,175 acres in the bottomland of the Ohio River. It is a National Natural Landmark and an Important Bird Area of Kentucky.

== Description ==
The Sloughs Wildlife Management Area (WMA) consists of 11,175 acres of Kentucky state-owned land, located relatively adjacent to the Ohio River and to the municipality of Henderson, Kentucky. Made up of three separate parcels of land, the wildlife management area is dominated by wetlands, which constitute 59.69% of the surveyed total. More than one-third of the overall wildlife management area has been listed as a National Natural Landmark (NNL), and the U.S. National Park Service characterizes this portion as "one of the largest wetlands remaining in Kentucky."

In addition to the core NNL, the National Audubon Society characterizes much of the surrounding Sloughs WMA as reclaimed wetland and hardwood bottomland that after use as agricultural land, "has been returned, as nearly as possible, to its natural condition." The reclaimed wetland is managed by levees and pumps. The overall Sloughs WMA provides winter habitat for approximately 15,000 migratory geese, 20,000 migratory ducks, and a bald eagle nesting ground.

In addition to its ecological value as a continuing place for bird life along major North American migratory paths and flyways, these sloughs near Henderson were a favorite hiking ground in the early 1800s for John James Audubon. Later famed as an artist and ornithologist, Audubon lived near here from 1812 until 1819 as an unsuccessful storekeeper.

The sloughs were named as a National Natural Landmark in 1974, and were listed as an Important Bird Area of Kentucky in 2006.
