= Union County Courthouse (Kentucky) =

- U.S. National Register of Historic Places
- U.S. Historic district – Contributing property
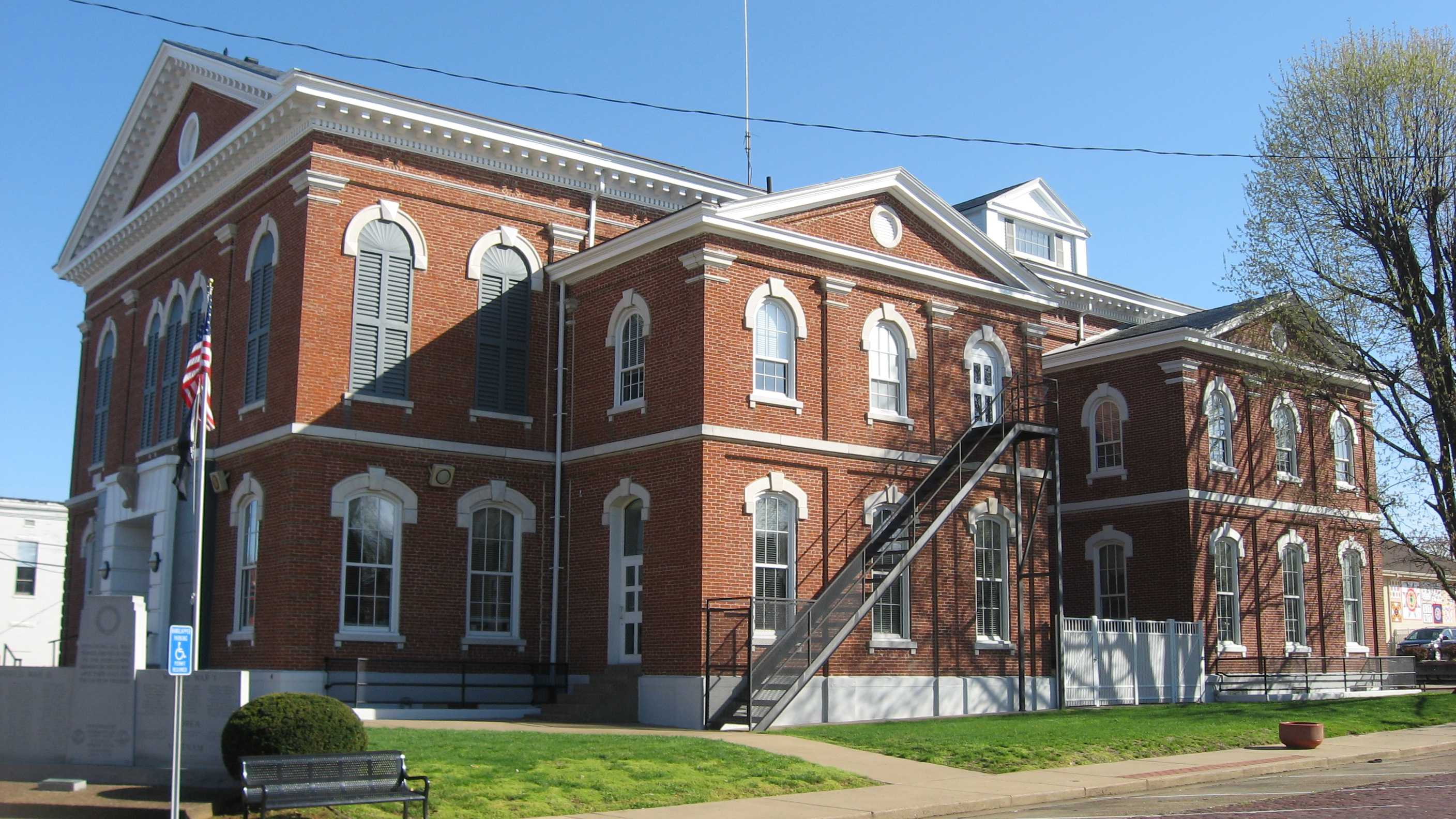

- Location within Kentucky Location within the United States
- Location: Morganfield, Kentucky
- Coordinates: 37°41′1″N 87°55′2″W
- Built: 1872
- Architect: Boyd & Frick, J. C. Frick
- Part of: Morganfield Commercial District (ID84002063)
- NRHP reference No.: 78001401

Significant dates
- Added to NRHP: November 17, 1978
- Designated CP: July 19, 1984

The Union County Courthouse in Morganfield, Kentucky was placed on the National Register of Historic Places on November 17, 1978. The current courthouse is the third one for Union County, and was opened in 1872. The Public Works Administration would later double the size on the courthouse.

Union County was named due to the near unanimous decision of the county's citizens to split from the county it was previously in, Henderson.

The first county courthouse for Union County was built in 1811–1812. The second courthouse was built in 1819–1820. That courthouse would be destroyed during the Civil War. The current courthouse was built in 1871–1872.

Although born in Kentucky, Abraham Lincoln gave only one political speech in that state. This speech was presented at the Union County courthouse. It was in 1840 when Lincoln, at the age of 31 and an elector from Illinois, campaigned for the Whig presidential candidate William Henry Harrison. This was done after Lincoln led a parade from Shawneetown, Illinois, with white horses pulling floats carrying ladies.
