= John T. Myers Locks and Dam =

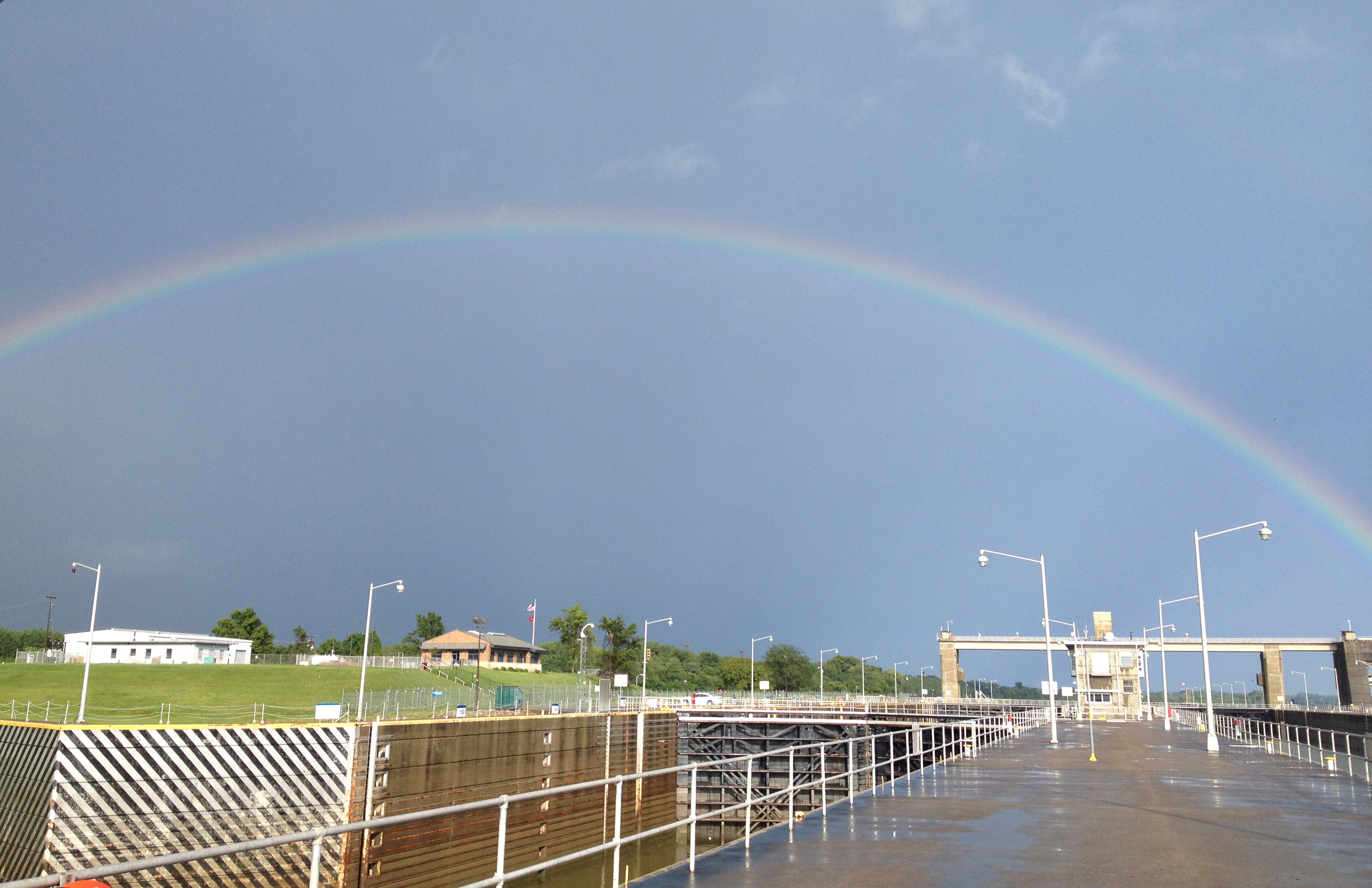
- Official name: John T. Myers Locks and Dam
- Location: Posey County, Indiana / Union County, Kentucky, United States
- Coordinates: 37.7935°N 87.9909°W
- Construction began: 1965
- Opening date: 1977
- Operator(s): United States Army Corps of Engineers Louisville District,

Dam and spillways
- Impounds: Ohio River
- Length: 3504 ft (1068 m)

The John T. Myers Locks and Dam is the 17th Lock and dam on the Ohio River located 846 miles downstream of Pittsburgh about 3 miles (4.8 km) downstream from Uniontown, Kentucky. There are two locks, one for commercial barge traffic that is 1,200 feet long by 110 feet wide, and the auxiliary lock is 600 feet long by 110 feet wide. This United States Army Corps of Engineers facility is in Posey County, Indiana, and Union County, Kentucky. The project was authorized as replacement for existing Locks and Dam 48 and 49 on September 17, 1958, by Secretary of the Army under authority of Section 6 of the Rivers and Harbors Act approved March 3, 1909, as amended.

Formerly known as the Uniontown Locks and Dam, it was renamed by an act of Congress in 1996 (PL 104-303) as a tribute to recently retired Congressman John T. Myers.
