= Curlew, Kentucky =

Unincorporated community in Kentucky, United States

Curlew
- Unincorporated community
- Location within the state of Kentucky Curlew (the United States)
- Coordinates: 37°34′40″N 88°5′12″W
- Country: United States
- State: Kentucky
- County: Union
- Elevation: 381 ft (116 m)
- Time zone: UTC-6 (Central (CST))
  - Summer (DST): UTC-5 (CST)
- GNIS feature ID: 507799

Curlew is an unincorporated community and coal town in Union County, Kentucky, United States.

A post office was established in 1858 in the community, which was named for a local mine owner.
