= Dekoven, Kentucky =

Unincorporated community in Kentucky, United States

Dekoven
- Unincorporated community
- Location within the state of Kentucky Dekoven (the United States)
- Coordinates: 37°34′29″N 88°4′20″W
- Country: United States
- State: Kentucky
- County: Union
- Elevation: 400 ft (120 m)
- Time zone: UTC-6 (Central (CST))
  - Summer (DST): UTC-5 (CST)
- GNIS feature ID: 490789

Dekoven is an unincorporated community and coal town in Union County, Kentucky, United States.

In 1843 a native of Flanders, Belgium started a coal mining operation. He named the community DeKoven, Flemish for "a camp or village among the hills". A post office was established in 1871 and discontinued after 1938.
