= Lake Beshear =

- Location within Kentucky Location within the United States
- Location: Caldwell / Christian counties, Kentucky, United States
- Coordinates: 37°08′23″N 87°40′58″W
- Type: reservoir
- Basin countries: United States
- Surface area: 784 acres (317 ha)
- Average depth: 10 ft (3.0 m)
- Max. depth: 35 ft (11 m)
- Shore length^{1}: 23.6 miles (38.0 km)
- Surface elevation: 410 feet (120 m)
- ^{1} Shore length is not a well-defined measure.

Lake Beshear is a 760-acre (3.1 km^{2}) reservoir located in Caldwell and Christian counties in Kentucky. Impounded in 1962, the lake lies within the Pennyrile Forest State Resort Park.

== See also ==
- Pennyrile Forest State Resort Park
