= Waverly, Kentucky =

- City
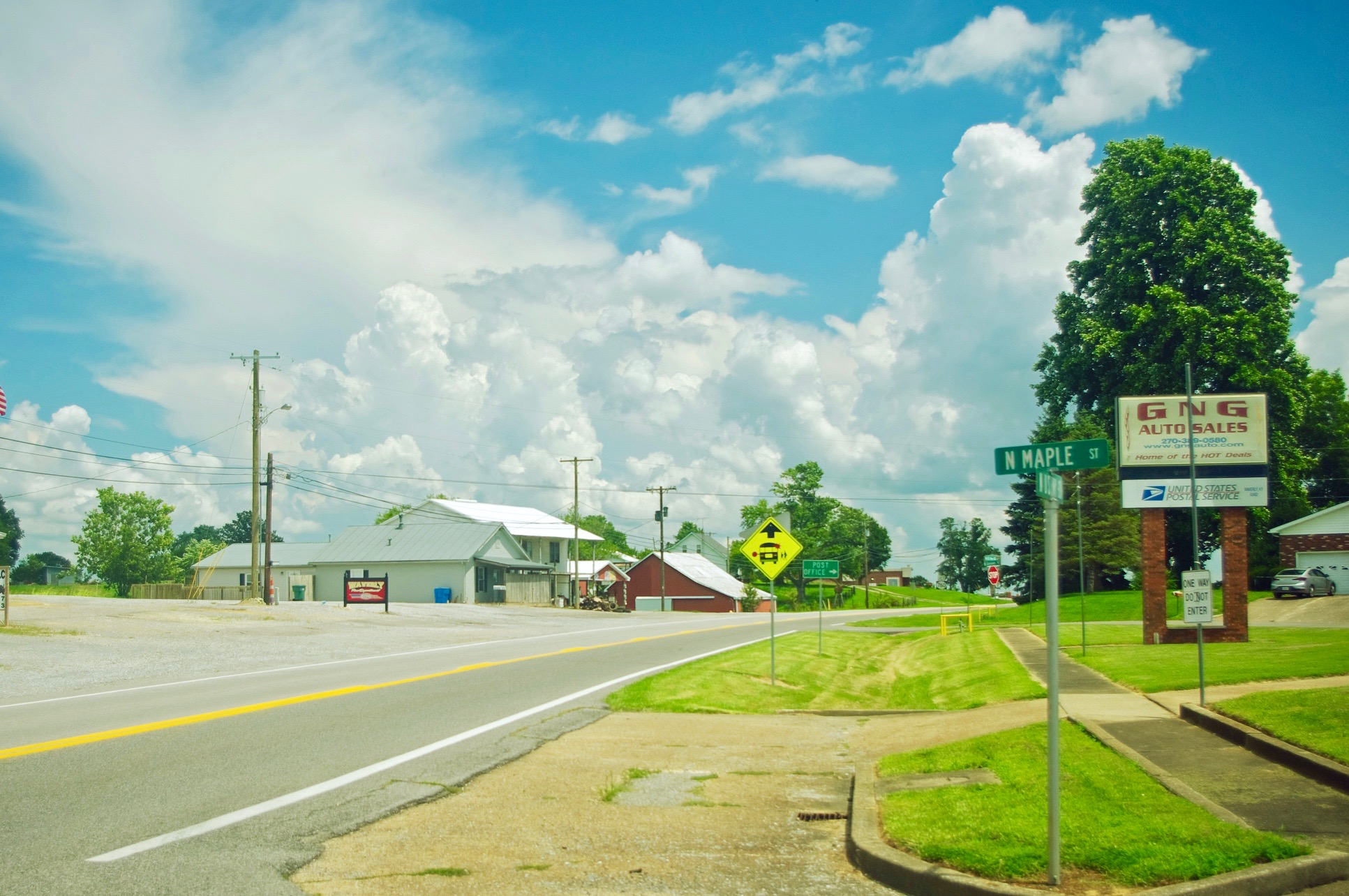
- Businesses along US-60 in Waverly

- Location of Waverly in Union County, Kentucky.
- Coordinates: 37°42′35″N 87°48′55″W
- Country: United States
- State: Kentucky
- County: Union

Area
  - Total: 0.27 sq mi (0.69 km^{2})
  - Land: 0.27 sq mi (0.69 km^{2})
  - Water: 0 sq mi (0.00 km^{2})
- Elevation: 413 ft (126 m)

Population (2020)
  - Total: 311
  - Density: 1,163.8/sq mi (449.34/km^{2})
- Time zone: UTC-6 (Central (CST))
  - Summer (DST): UTC-5 (CDT)
- ZIP code: 42462
- Area code: 270
- FIPS code: 21-80958
- GNIS feature ID: 0506302

Waverly is a home rule-class city in Union County, Kentucky, United States. As of the 2020 census, Waverly had a population of 311. Founded in 1870, the city was named for founder Hugh McElroy's nephew.

== Geography ==
Waverly is located at 37°42′35″N 87°48′55″W (37.709738, -87.815278).

According to the United States Census Bureau, the city has a total area of 0.3 square miles (0.78 km^{2}), all land.

== Demographics ==
Historical population
Census	Pop.	Note	%±
1880	179		—
1890	241		34.6%
1910	311		—
1920	475		52.7%
1930	445		−6.3%
1940	323		−27.4%
1950	345		6.8%
1960	331		−4.1%
1970	335		1.2%
1980	434		29.6%
1990	345		−20.5%
2000	297		−13.9%
2010	308		3.7%
2020	311		1.0%
U.S. Decennial Census

As of the census of 2000, there were 297 people, 126 households, and 85 families residing in the city. The population density was 1,116.1 inhabitants per square mile (430.9/km^{2}). There were 133 housing units at an average density of 499.8 per square mile (193.0/km^{2}). The racial makeup of the city was 94.28% White and 5.72% African American. Hispanic or Latino of any race were 0.34% of the population.

There were 126 households, out of which 27.8% had children under the age of 18 living with them, 57.9% were married couples living together, 7.9% had a female householder with no husband present, and 32.5% were non-families. 28.6% of all households were made up of individuals, and 18.3% had someone living alone who was 65 years of age or older. The average household size was 2.36 and the average family size was 2.92.

In the city, the population was spread out, with 21.2% under the age of 18, 9.1% from 18 to 24, 29.3% from 25 to 44, 24.2% from 45 to 64, and 16.2% who were 65 years of age or older. The median age was 38 years. For every 100 females, there were 86.8 males. For every 100 females age 18 and over, there were 88.7 males.

The median income for a household in the city was $33,438, and the median income for a family was $34,821. Males had a median income of $24,583 versus $21,136 for females. The per capita income for the city was $15,594. About 7.4% of families and 9.1% of the population were below the poverty line, including 18.3% of those under the age of eighteen and 4.2% of those 65 or over.

== See also ==
- George N. Proctor House
