= Pennyrile Forest State Resort Park =

State park in Kentucky, United States

- Location within Kentucky Location within the United States
- Type: Kentucky state park
- Location: Christian County, Kentucky, United States
- Coordinates: 37°04′07″N 87°39′49″W
- Area: 863 acres (349 ha)
- Elevation: 453 ft (138 m)
- Established: 1954
- Administrator: Kentucky Department of Parks
- Website: Official website

Pennyrile Forest State Resort Park is a public recreation area located in northwestern Christian County, Kentucky, just south of Dawson Springs, Kentucky. The state park encompasses 863 acres (349 ha) and takes its name from a colloquial form of the word pennyroyal, a small flowering plant native to the area.

== Facilities ==
The park features include a 24-room lodge with restaurant, 12 cottages, campground, multi-purpose trails, 18-hole golf course, and 56-acre (23 ha) lake with non-motorized boat rentals. The park was sited around an existing lake, behind a dam originally built in 1938.
