= Union County High School (Kentucky) =

Location
- 4464 US Highway 60 West; Morganfield, KY 42437; United States; 37.62977°N 87.9447°W

Information
- Type: Public
- Motto: Be Brave. Lead Nations. Impact Generations.
- Established: 1964
- School district: Union County Public Schools
- Superintendent: Tara Hancock
- Principal: Amy Nelson
- Teaching staff: 38.25 (FTE)
- Grades: 9–12
- Enrollment: 666 (2023–2024)
- Student to teacher ratio: 17.41
- Campus type: Rural
- Colors: Columbia Blue, White, Red & Black
- Mascot: Chief Unico
- Nickname: Braves/Bravettes
- Rival: Henderson County
- Website: Union County High School webpage

Union County High School is a secondary school located at 4464 US Highway 60 West just outside the city of Morganfield, Kentucky. It is part of the Union County Public Schools district located in Union County, Kentucky. The school opened in 1964 following the consolidation of Morganfield, Sturgis and in 1967, Morganfield St. Vincent. It has approximately 700 students.

== Academic performance ==
The school experienced its highest academic gain ever in the 2008-2009 round of KCCT testing; this set a record in the state for the highest academic gain ever.

== Athletics ==
The Union County Braves and Bravettes compete in the following sports: Cross Country, Volleyball, Football, Wrestling, Women's Wrestling, Basketball, Baseball, Softball, Women's Soccer, Golf, Track & Field, Tennis, and Archery.

Union County High has won the following Kentucky High School Athletic Association (KHSAA) team state championships:

- Girls Basketball – 1996
- Boys Outdoor Track & Field – 1997, 1998, 1999
- Wrestling – 1976, 1980, 1982, 2007, 2008, 2011, 2014, 2016, 2017, 2018, 2019, 2020, 2021, 2022, 2024, 2025, 2026
