= Sturgis, Kentucky =

- City
- Location of Sturgis in Union County, Kentucky.
- Coordinates: 37°32′54″N 87°59′4″W
- Country: United States
- State: Kentucky
- County: Union

Area
  - Total: 1.57 sq mi (4.07 km^{2})
  - Land: 1.57 sq mi (4.06 km^{2})
  - Water: 0.0039 sq mi (0.01 km^{2})
- Elevation: 371 ft (113 m)

Population (2020)
  - Total: 1,735
  - Estimate (2022): 1,686
  - Density: 1,107.6/sq mi (427.65/km^{2})
- Time zone: UTC-6 (Central (CST))
  - Summer (DST): UTC-5 (CDT)
- ZIP code: 42459
- Area code: 270
- FIPS code: 21-74316
- GNIS feature ID: 0504617

Sturgis is a home rule-class city in Union County, Kentucky, United States. As of the 2020 census, Sturgis had a population of 1,735. Located in northwest Kentucky, the city was founded in 1890 and named for Samuel Sturgis, who owned the land now occupied by the city.

The town is known within the motorcycle community for the Kentucky Bike Rally, previously known as the Little Sturgis Bike Rally. The name change came as a result of a lawsuit from Sturgis, South Dakota, regarding the use of the name Sturgis, despite both communities having the same name.

== History ==
The area surrounding what would become Sturgis was first settled by American Revolutionary War officers, mostly from Virginia, who had received bounty land for their service. The History of Union County, published in 1886 by The Courier Co., says, "The county had its aristocrats but the [Civil] War had a decidedly leveling tendency yet, there is a tolerably well defined line still marking the society of the county into different sets."

Sturgis was founded the same year as a company town by the Cumberland Land and Iron Company within its coal-mining development. The name derives from either Samuel P. Sturgis, who originally owned the townsite, or for Alida Livingston Sturgis (Samuel's sister), who was married to the president and general manager of the Ohio Valley Railroad Company. The community incorporated as a town on May 3, 1890, with population of 327. The town was reclassified as a city in the 1920s.

== Geography ==
Sturgis is located at 37°32′54″N 87°59′4″W (37.548269, -87.984535).

According to the United States Census Bureau, the city has a total area of 1.5 square miles (3.9 km^{2}), all land.

== Demographics ==
Historical population
Census	Pop.	Note	%±
1890	327		—
1900	1,258		284.7%
1910	1,467		16.6%
1920	1,750		19.3%
1930	2,154		23.1%
1940	2,321		7.8%
1950	2,222		−4.3%
1960	2,209		−0.6%
1970	2,210		0.0%
1980	2,293		3.8%
1990	2,184		−4.8%
2000	2,030		−7.1%
2010	1,898		−6.5%
2020	1,735		−8.6%
2022 (est.)	1,686		−2.8%
U.S. Decennial Census

=== 2020 census ===
As of the 2020 census, Sturgis had a population of 1,735. The median age was 41.8 years. 23.3% of residents were under the age of 18 and 20.7% of residents were 65 years of age or older. For every 100 females there were 89.8 males, and for every 100 females age 18 and over there were 83.8 males age 18 and over.

0.0% of residents lived in urban areas, while 100.0% lived in rural areas.

There were 766 households in Sturgis, of which 30.3% had children under the age of 18 living in them. Of all households, 41.5% were married-couple households, 17.8% were households with a male householder and no spouse or partner present, and 32.9% were households with a female householder and no spouse or partner present. About 32.4% of all households were made up of individuals and 15.6% had someone living alone who was 65 years of age or older.

There were 885 housing units, of which 13.4% were vacant. The homeowner vacancy rate was 1.7% and the rental vacancy rate was 12.9%.

Racial composition as of the 2020 census
Race	Number	Percent
White	1,520	87.6%
Black or African American	109	6.3%
American Indian and Alaska Native	1	0.1%
Asian	1	0.1%
Native Hawaiian and Other Pacific Islander	1	0.1%
Some other race	4	0.2%
Two or more races	99	5.7%
Hispanic or Latino (of any race)	21	1.2%

=== 2000 census ===
As of the census of 2000, there were 2,030 people, 854 households, and 578 families residing in the city. The population density was 1,343.2 inhabitants per square mile (518.6/km^{2}). There were 973 housing units at an average density of 643.8 per square mile (248.6/km^{2}). The racial makeup of the city was 88.47% White, 9.66% African American, 0.39% Native American, 0.15% Asian, 0.10% from other races, and 1.23% from two or more races. Hispanic or Latino of any race were 1.23% of the population.

There were 854 households, out of which 30.4% had children under the age of 18 living with them, 48.4% were married couples living together, 15.0% had a female householder with no husband present, and 32.3% were non-families. 31.0% of all households were made up of individuals, and 18.3% had someone living alone who was 65 years of age or older. The average household size was 2.34 and the average family size was 2.90.

In the city, the population was spread out, with 24.3% under the age of 18, 8.8% from 18 to 24, 24.3% from 25 to 44, 23.4% from 45 to 64, and 19.1% who were 65 years of age or older. The median age was 39 years. For every 100 females, there were 81.3 males. For every 100 females age 18 and over, there were 79.1 males.

The median income for a household in the city was $28,664, and the median income for a family was $34,922. Males had a median income of $30,435 versus $18,295 for females. The per capita income for the city was $14,124. About 13.7% of families and 16.0% of the population were below the poverty line, including 19.7% of those under age 18 and 16.9% of those age 65 or over.

== Education ==
Public education in Sturgis is administered by Union County Public Schools. The district operates Sturgis Elementary School, Union County Middle School, and Union County High School.

Sturgis has a lending library, a branch of the Union County Public Library.

== Climate ==
The climate in this area is characterized by hot, humid summers and generally mild to cool winters. According to the Köppen Climate Classification system, Sturgis has a humid subtropical climate, abbreviated "Cfa" on climate maps.
