= Morganfield, Kentucky =

- City
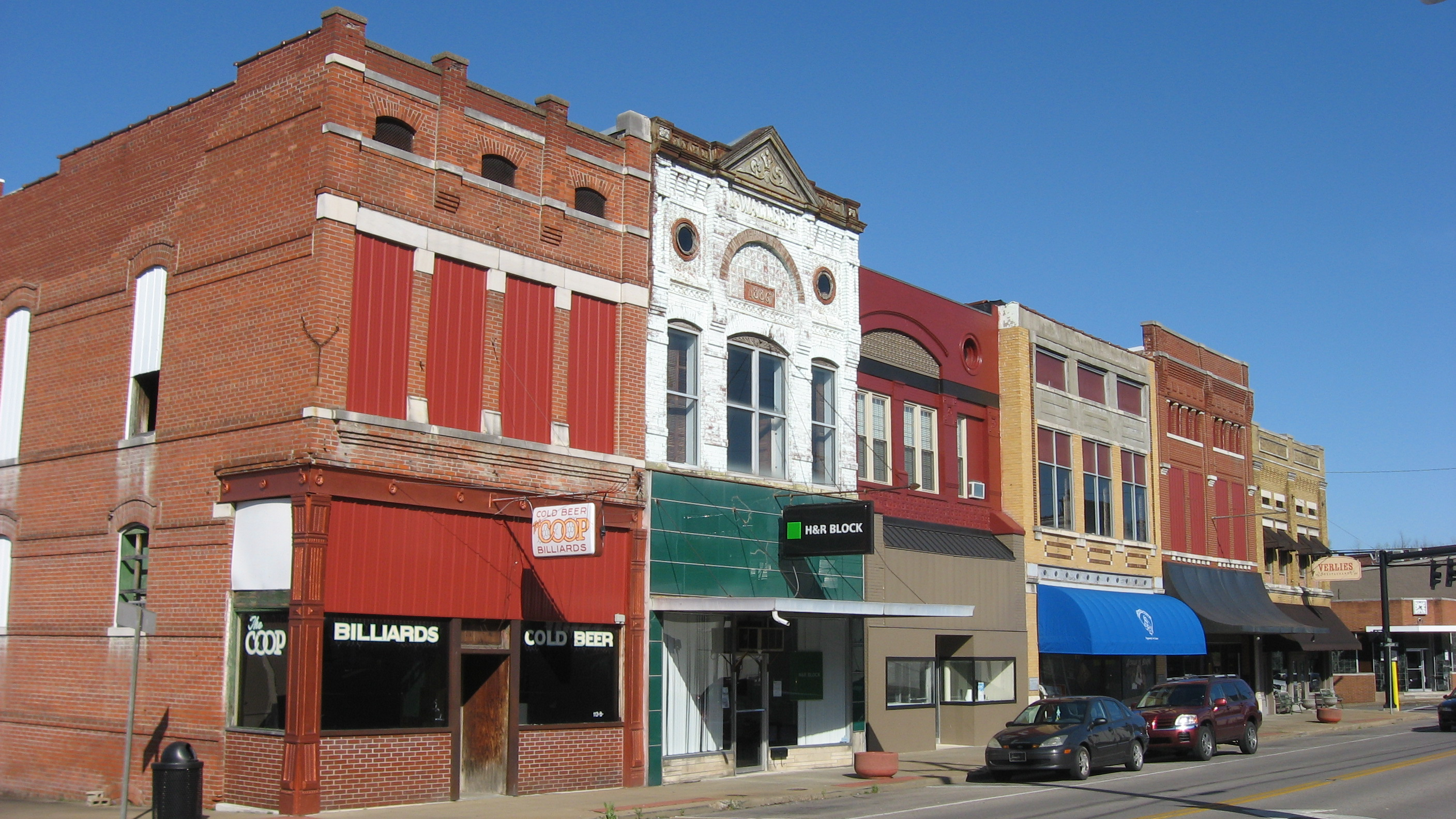
- Main Street downtown

- Flag Seal

- Location of Morganfield in Union County, Kentucky.
- Coordinates: 37°41′4″N 87°54′43″W
- Country: United States
- State: Kentucky
- County: Union
- Established: January 6, 1812
- Incorporated: March 16, 1870
- Named for: Daniel Morgan

Government
  - Mayor: Randy Greenwell

Area
  - Total: 2.84 sq mi (7.36 km^{2})
  - Land: 2.81 sq mi (7.29 km^{2})
  - Water: 0.031 sq mi (0.08 km^{2})
- Elevation: 437 ft (133 m)

Population (2020)
  - Total: 3,256
  - Estimate (2024): 3,131
  - Density: 1,157.0/sq mi (446.71/km^{2})
- Time zone: UTC-6 (CST)
  - Summer (DST): UTC-5 (CDT)
- ZIP Code: 42437
- Area codes: 270 & 364
- FIPS code: 21-53472
- GNIS feature ID: 0498597
- Website: morganfield.ky.gov

Morganfield is a home rule-class city in Union County, Kentucky, in the United States. It is the seat of its county. As of the 2020 census, Morganfield had a population of 3,256.

== Name ==
The city was named for Revolutionary War General Daniel Morgan, who was awarded a land grant for his military service. Morganfield later developed on this land.

== Geography ==
Morganfield is located at 37°41′04″N 87°54′43″W. According to the United States Census Bureau, the city has a total area of 2.1 square miles (5.5 km^{2}), of which 2.1 square miles (5.4 km^{2}) is land and 0.04 square mile (0.1 km^{2}) (1.42%) is water.

== Demographics ==
Historical population
Census	Pop.	Note	%±
1830	295		—
1840	360		22.0%
1860	460		—
1870	300		−34.8%
1880	744		148.0%
1890	1,094		47.0%
1900	2,046		87.0%
1910	2,725		33.2%
1920	2,651		−2.7%
1930	2,551		−3.8%
1940	3,079		20.7%
1950	3,257		5.8%
1960	3,741		14.9%
1970	3,563		−4.8%
1980	3,781		6.1%
1990	3,776		−0.1%
2000	3,494		−7.5%
2010	3,285		−6.0%
2020	3,256		−0.9%
2024 (est.)	3,134		−3.7%
U.S. Decennial Census

=== 2020 census ===
As of the 2020 census, Morganfield had a population of 3,256. The median age was 41.2 years. 23.2% of residents were under the age of 18 and 22.6% of residents were 65 years of age or older. For every 100 females there were 86.9 males, and for every 100 females age 18 and over there were 83.9 males age 18 and over.

0.0% of residents lived in urban areas, while 100.0% lived in rural areas.

There were 1,298 households in Morganfield, of which 31.1% had children under the age of 18 living in them. Of all households, 45.3% were married-couple households, 15.8% were households with a male householder and no spouse or partner present, and 31.9% were households with a female householder and no spouse or partner present. About 30.3% of all households were made up of individuals and 14.4% had someone living alone who was 65 years of age or older.

There were 1,450 housing units, of which 10.5% were vacant. The homeowner vacancy rate was 2.2% and the rental vacancy rate was 11.6%.

Racial composition as of the 2020 census
Race	Number	Percent
White	2,629	80.7%
Black or African American	416	12.8%
American Indian and Alaska Native	6	0.2%
Asian	4	0.1%
Native Hawaiian and Other Pacific Islander	0	0.0%
Some other race	38	1.2%
Two or more races	163	5.0%
Hispanic or Latino (of any race)	64	2.0%

=== 2000 census ===
As of the census of 2000, there were 3,494 people, 1,434 households, and 926 families residing in the city. The population density was 1,671.5 inhabitants per square mile (645.4/km^{2}). There were 1,581 housing units at an average density of 756.3 per square mile (292.0/km^{2}). The racial makeup of the city was 82.34% White, 16.23% African American, 0.03% Native American, 0.17% Asian, 0.17% from other races, and 1.06% from two or more races. Hispanic or Latino of any race were 0.86% of the population.

There were 1,434 households, out of which 28.0% had children under the age of 18 living with them, 47.6% were married couples living together, 14.1% had a female householder with no husband present, and 35.4% were non-families. 32.4% of all households were made up of individuals, and 15.1% had someone living alone who was 65 years of age or older. The average household size was 2.37 and the average family size was 3.01.

In the city, the population was spread out, with 24.5% under the age of 18, 9.3% from 18 to 24, 24.8% from 25 to 44, 24.7% from 45 to 64, and 16.7% who were 65 years of age or older. The median age was 39 years. For every 100 females, there were 84.9 males. For every 100 females age 18 and over, there were 81.7 males.

The median income for a household in the city was $38,676, and the median income for a family was $52,864. Males had a median income of $32,831 versus $22,736 for females. The per capita income for the city was $19,251. About 9.9% of families and 12.3% of the population were below the poverty line, including 19.2% of those under age 18 and 15.1% of those age 65 or over.

== Camp Breckinridge ==
Morganfield is located near Camp Breckinridge, a World War II infantry division camp and prisoner-of-war camp. During that war, the camp comprised 36,070 acres (14,600 ha) and could accommodate 2,031 officers and 42,092 enlisted men. About 40,000 soldiers preparing for the war stayed at the camp. The camp also held about 3,000 German prisoners-of-war before being deactivated in 1949. During the Korean War, Camp Breckinridge was the headquarters of the 506th Regiment of the 101st Airborne Division and was used for basic training of newly inducted U.S. Army recruits.

The Associated Press reported on May 22, 2007, that families of displaced residents of the area that became Camp Breckenridge have continued to seek more compensation from the U.S. government for their former properties, claiming they were not given just value. Former U.S. Supreme Court Justice Sandra Day O'Connor was named as a mediator in the dispute in February 2007.

The camp was renovated and re-opened in 1965 as the "Breckinridge Job Corps Center". The name was later changed to the "Earle C. Clements Job Corps Center" in 1980, to honor Earle C. Clements, a former Kentucky governor and U.S. senator.

== Education ==
Morganfield is served by the Union County Public Schools, Kentucky. Elementary students attend Morganfield Elementary. Middle and High School students attend Union County Middle School & Union County High School located outside Morganfield. A parochial school, John Paul II, is located in Morganfield. The Earle C. Clements Job Corps facility is also located in Morganfield.

Morganfield has a lending library, a branch of the Union County Public Library.

== Climate ==
The climate in this area is characterized by hot, humid summers and generally mild to cool winters. According to the Köppen Climate Classification system, Morganfield has a humid subtropical climate, abbreviated "Cfa" on climate maps.

== Notable people ==
- Nancy Huston Banks, novelist and journalist
- Dwane Casey – Professional basketball coach, most recently, as the head coach for the NBA's Detroit Pistons. Former college basketball player and assistant coach for the Kentucky Wildcats, and also former Minnesota Timberwolves & Toronto Raptors head coach
- Earle Clements – Former U.S. Senator, Former Governor of Kentucky and Former U.S. Representative
- Kassie DePaiva – Soap opera actress known for her roles on Guiding Light as Chelsea Reardon and best known for One Life to Live and General Hospital as Blair Cramer Manning
- Mallory Ervin – Miss Kentucky 2009 and 4th runner-up at Miss America 2010
- Ed Johnson – Former baseball player
- Larry Johnson – Former basketball player
- Jerry Wayne Parrish – Former United States Army corporal who defected to North Korea; died in Pyongyang, North Korea in 1998.
- Dottie Rambo – Gospel singer/songwriter
- John Selby Townsend – Iowa jurist and legislator
- Thomas Lyle Williams - businessman, founder of Maybelline
