= Union County, Kentucky =

County in Kentucky, United States

- County
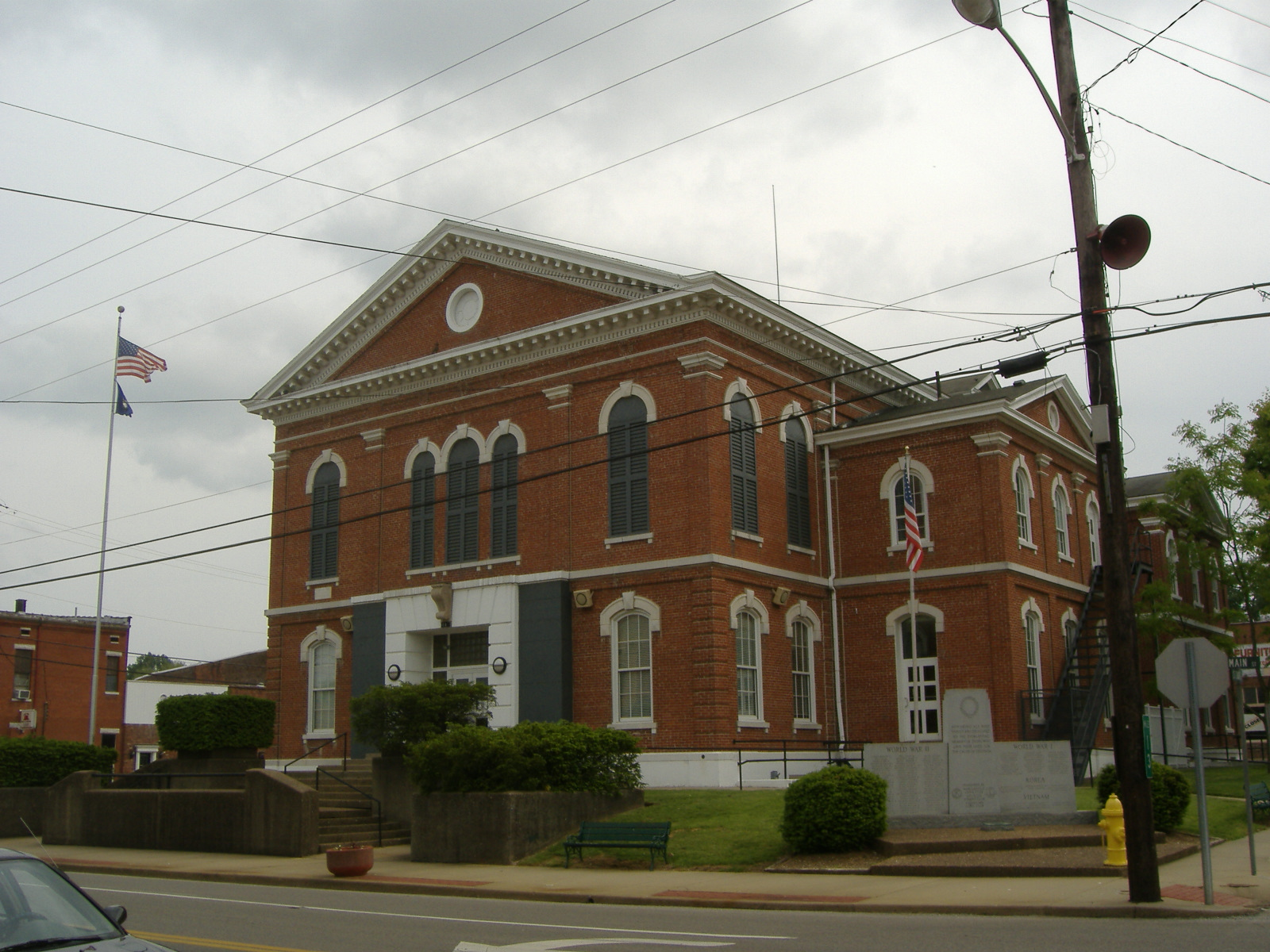
- Union County Courthouse

- Location within the U.S. state of Kentucky
- Coordinates: 37°40′N 87°57′W
- Country: United States
- State: Kentucky
- Founded: January 15, 1811
- Seat: Morganfield
- Largest city: Morganfield

Government
  - Judge/Executive: Adam O'Nan (R)

Area
  - Total: 363.38 sq mi (941.1 km^{2})
  - Land: 342.85 sq mi (888.0 km^{2})
  - Water: 20.53 sq mi (53.2 km^{2}) 5.6%

Population (2020)
  - Total: 13,668
  - Estimate (2025): 12,839 ▼
  - Density: 39.866/sq mi (15.392/km^{2})
- Time zone: UTC−6 (Central)
  - Summer (DST): UTC−5 (CDT)
- Congressional district: 1st
- Website: www.unioncountyky.org

Union County is a county in the U.S. state of Kentucky. As of the 2020 census, the population was 13,668. Its county seat is Morganfield. The county was created effective January 15, 1811.

The county is located on the east bank of the Ohio River opposite its confluence with the Wabash River. Union County, along with neighboring Posey County, Indiana, and Gallatin County, Illinois, form the tri-point of the Illinois–Indiana–Kentucky tri-state area.

== Geography ==
Union County lies on the northern border of Kentucky; its northwestern border is formed by the meanders of the Ohio River, abutting the states of Illinois and Indiana. The county terrain consists of frequent low wooded hills among the level areas, which are devoted to agriculture. Its highest point (673 feet/205 meters ASL) is a rise in the Chalybeate Hills, in the Higginson-Henry Wildlife Management Area.

The John T. Myers Locks and Dam, authorized and constructed as Uniontown Locks and Dam, is located 3.5 miles (5.6 km) downstream from Uniontown, on the Ohio River, linking Union County and Posey County Indiana. Construction of the dam was begun in 1965 by the U.S. Army Corps of Engineers and completed in 1977. It was renamed on October 12, 1996, to honor retired Indiana congressman John T. Myers.

According to the United States Census Bureau, the county has a total area of 363.38 square miles (941.1 km^{2}), of which 342.85 square miles (888.0 km^{2}) is land and 20.53 square miles (53.2 km^{2}) (5.6%) is water. Union County is part of the Western Coal Fields region of Kentucky.

=== Adjacent counties ===
- Posey County, Indiana − north
- Henderson County − northeast
- Webster County − southeast
- Crittenden County − south
- Hardin County, Illinois − west
- Gallatin County, Illinois −northwest

=== Protected areas ===
- Higginson-Henry Wildlife Management Area (state)
- Moffit Lake Recreation Area (county)

=== Highways ===
- U.S. Route 60
- KY 56
- KY 109

== Communities ==
=== Cities ===
- Morganfield
- Sturgis
- Uniontown
- Waverly

=== Census-designated places ===
- Breckinridge Center

=== Unincorporated communities ===
- Bordley
- Boxville
- Caseyville
- Cullen
- Curlew
- Dekoven
- Grangertown
- Grove Center
- Henshaw
- Pride
- Spring Grove
- Sullivan
- The Rocks

== Demographics ==
Historical population
Census	Pop.	Note	%±
1820	3,470		—
1830	4,764		37.3%
1840	6,673		40.1%
1850	9,012		35.1%
1860	12,791		41.9%
1870	13,640		6.6%
1880	17,809		30.6%
1890	18,229		2.4%
1900	21,326		17.0%
1910	19,886		−6.8%
1920	18,040		−9.3%
1930	17,053		−5.5%
1940	17,411		2.1%
1950	14,893		−14.5%
1960	14,537		−2.4%
1970	15,882		9.3%
1980	17,821		12.2%
1990	16,557		−7.1%
2000	15,637		−5.6%
2010	15,007		−4.0%
2020	13,668		−8.9%
2025 (est.)	12,839	▼	−6.1%
U.S. Decennial Census; 1790-1960 1900-1990; 1990-2000 2010-2020

=== 2020 census ===
As of the 2020 census, the county had a population of 13,668. The median age was 39.9 years. 23.5% of residents were under the age of 18 and 18.8% of residents were 65 years of age or older. For every 100 females there were 98.9 males, and for every 100 females age 18 and over there were 97.3 males age 18 and over.

The racial makeup of the county was 86.9% White, 7.6% Black or African American, 0.2% American Indian and Alaska Native, 0.2% Asian, 0.0% Native Hawaiian and Pacific Islander, 0.7% from some other race, and 4.3% from two or more races. Hispanic or Latino residents of any race comprised 1.4% of the population.

0.0% of residents lived in urban areas, while 100.0% lived in rural areas.

There were 5,293 households in the county, of which 30.7% had children under the age of 18 living with them and 25.1% had a female householder with no spouse or partner present. About 27.1% of all households were made up of individuals and 12.2% had someone living alone who was 65 years of age or older.

There were 5,863 housing units, of which 9.7% were vacant. Among occupied housing units, 72.1% were owner-occupied and 27.9% were renter-occupied. The homeowner vacancy rate was 1.2% and the rental vacancy rate was 10.5%.

=== 2010 census ===
As of the census of 2010, the population was 15,007. Of this, 85.45% were White, 12.05% were Black or African American, 1.49% were two or more races, 0.44% were some other race, 0.34% were Asian, 0.19% were American Indian or Alaska Native, 0.05% were Native Hawaiian or other Pacific Islander. Hispanic or Latino (of any race) were 1.62% of the population.

=== 2000 census ===
As of the census of 2000, there were 15,637 people, 5,710 households, and 4,082 families in the county. The population density was 45 per square mile (17/km^{2}). There were 6,234 housing units at an average density of 18 per square mile (6.9/km^{2}). The racial makeup of the county was 85.04% White, 12.89% Black or African American, 0.17% Native American, 0.15% Asian, 0.39% from other races, and 1.37% from two or more races. 1.56% of the population were Hispanic or Latino of any race.

There were 5,710 households, out of which 32.10% had children under the age of 18 living with them, 56.50% were married couples living together, 11.40% had a female householder with no husband present, and 28.50% were non-families. 26.10% of all households were made up of individuals, and 12.40% had someone living alone who was 65 years of age or older. The average household size was 2.50 and the average family size was 2.99.

25.30% of the population was under the age of 18, 13.80% from 18 to 24, 25.50% from 25 to 44, 22.50% from 45 to 64, and 12.90% who were 65 years of age or older. The median age was 34 years. For every 100 females there were 101.80 males. For every 100 females age 18 and over, there were 99.30 males.

The median income for a household in the county was $35,018, and the median income for a family was $43,103. Males had a median income of $30,244 versus $20,817 for females. The per capita income for the county was $17,465. About 9.30% of families and 17.70% of the population were below the poverty line, including 18.30% of those under age 18 and 11.70% of those age 65 or over.

== Education ==
Public schools are managed by Union County Public Schools. The three public elementary schools in the county are located in Morganfield, Sturgis, and Uniontown. The county has one public middle school and one public high school, Union County High School. Located near Morganfield, Kentucky, it is known for its wrestling program. John Paul II Catholic School, the county's only private school, in Morganfield, holds preschool, elementary, and middle school classes.

== Libraries ==
There are three libraries in Union County, with the main branch in Morganfield and branches in Sturgis and Uniontown.tic experience for grades K-5. The library supplies the county with educational resources such as computers with internet access. There are several programs for children:

- Time for Tots is a range of activities including music, dancing, crafts, stories, and more. For ages 6 months to 5 years;
- Blox’ N Bots is a hands-on robotic experience for grades K-5;
- Between You and Me is a program for middle and high school students and an adult family member. Which includes crafts, games, and activities.

Access to KY Virtual Library provides: • Britannica Digital Learning • Databases • EBSCO • Kentucky Virtual Library • LearningExpress Library • NoveList • ProQuest • Scholastic GO! • TeenBookCloud (pilot) • WorldCat (OCLC)

The Union County Public Library District offers test-proctoring services at the Morganfield location.

Children's online educational resources include: • ABCya • Bob the builder • CoolMath4Kids • Dr. Seuss • Fun with Spot • KidzPage • Little Critter • Littlest Pet Shop • Neopets • Nick Jr. • Nickelodeon • PBS Kids • Ramo Math games • Star Wars • Turtle Diary • Typing games

Ready Reference Links include: Fast Facts, Health, Jobs, Kentucky Driver's Tests, Kentucky Legal Assistance Information, Kentucky Links, Kids, Language, Newspapers, People, Senior Links, Staff Resources, Tax Information, Teen Links, and Union County Links

== Politics ==
United States presidential election results for Union County, Kentucky
Year	Republican		Democratic		Third party(ies)	
Year	No.	%	No.	%	No.	%
1912	642	19.22%	2,168	64.91%	530	15.87%
1916	1,184	29.66%	2,754	68.99%	54	1.35%
1920	1,943	27.97%	4,919	70.81%	85	1.22%
1924	1,778	32.05%	3,493	62.97%	276	4.98%
1928	2,350	37.64%	3,884	62.21%	9	0.14%
1932	1,063	17.74%	4,892	81.66%	36	0.60%
1936	965	16.68%	4,713	81.47%	107	1.85%
1940	1,111	20.30%	4,355	79.56%	8	0.15%
1944	935	21.08%	3,489	78.65%	12	0.27%
1948	744	16.68%	3,607	80.86%	110	2.47%
1952	1,967	36.28%	3,445	63.54%	10	0.18%
1956	1,956	37.67%	2,863	55.13%	374	7.20%
1960	1,789	34.10%	3,457	65.90%	0	0.00%
1964	1,220	23.55%	3,934	75.93%	27	0.52%
1968	1,371	23.66%	2,616	45.15%	1,807	31.19%
1972	2,701	58.67%	1,855	40.29%	48	1.04%
1976	1,716	32.30%	3,540	66.64%	56	1.05%
1980	1,847	33.97%	3,479	63.99%	111	2.04%
1984	2,524	44.78%	3,090	54.82%	23	0.41%
1988	2,292	40.72%	3,316	58.92%	20	0.36%
1992	1,605	27.97%	3,325	57.94%	809	14.10%
1996	1,554	30.57%	2,913	57.30%	617	12.14%
2000	2,749	51.21%	2,547	47.45%	72	1.34%
2004	3,534	59.13%	2,398	40.12%	45	0.75%
2008	3,120	51.71%	2,804	46.47%	110	1.82%
2012	3,955	66.15%	1,942	32.48%	82	1.37%
2016	4,701	75.69%	1,331	21.43%	179	2.88%
2020	4,965	75.49%	1,529	23.25%	83	1.26%
2024	4,758	78.54%	1,225	20.22%	75	1.24%

Union County was a longtime Democratic stronghold in presidential elections. However, it gradually shifted to supporting Republican candidates. In 2016, Donald Trump won more than three fourths of the county's vote.

=== Elected officials ===
Elected officials as of January 3, 2025
U.S. House	James Comer (R)	KY 1
Ky. Senate	Robby Mills (R)	4
Ky. House	Jim Gooch Jr. (R)	12

== Notable people ==
- Ben M. Bogard lived as a child in Union County; became a Baptist minister and was involved with the Landmarkism Movement.
- Dwane Casey, longtime NBA head coach, most recently head coach of the Detroit Pistons.
- Earle Clements, state Senate majority leader, congressman (1945-47), governor (1947-50), U.S. senator (1950-56), assiatant and acting majority leader of the U.S. Senate under Lyndon B. Johnson and president of The Tobacco Institute (1966-70).
- Ormsby M. Mitchel, astronomer and major general during the American Civil War.
- Isaiah L. Potts (1784?-after 1843), tavern keeper of the notorious Potts Tavern who allegedly ran a gang of highwaymen and murderers on the Illinois frontier,
- William L. O'Daniel (1923−2017), a Union County farmer who served in the Illinois General Assembly.

== See also ==
- National Register of Historic Places listings in Union County, Kentucky
