= List of Kentucky supplemental roads and rural secondary highways (200–299) =

Kentucky supplemental roads and rural secondary highways (200–299)
- Highway markers for KY 200 and KY 299

Highway names
- Interstates: Interstate nn (I-nn)
- US Highways: U.S. Highway nn (US nn)
- State: KY nn

System links
- Kentucky State Highway System; Interstate; US; State; Parkways
- Supplemental/Rural Secondary; 1–199; 200–299; 300–399; 400–499; 500–599; 600–699; 700–799; 800–899; 900–999; 1000–1499; 1500–1999; 2000–2499; 2500–2999; 3000–3499; 3500–6999

Kentucky supplemental roads and rural secondary highways are the lesser two of the four functional classes of highways constructed and maintained by the Kentucky Transportation Cabinet, the state-level agency that constructs and maintains highways in Kentucky. The agency splits its inventory of state highway mileage into four categories:

- The State Primary System includes Interstate Highways, Parkways, and other long-distance highways of statewide importance that connect the state's major cities, including much of the courses of Kentucky's U.S. Highways.
- The State Secondary System includes highways of regional importance that connect the state's smaller urban centers, including those county seats not served by the state primary system.
- The Rural Secondary System includes highways of local importance, such as farm-to-market roads and urban collectors.
- Supplemental Roads are the set of highways not in the first three systems, including frontage roads, bypassed portions of other state highways, and rural roads that only serve their immediate area.

The same-numbered highway can comprise sections of road under different categories. This list contains descriptions of Supplemental Roads and highways in the Rural Secondary System numbered 200 to 299 that do not have portions within the State Primary and State Secondary systems.

== KY 200 ==
Kentucky Route 200
- Location: Sandclift–Number One
- Length: 18.041 mi (29.034 km)

Kentucky Route 200 is a 18.041-mile-long (29.034 km) rural secondary highway that traverses far southeastern Clinton County and the southern half of Wayne County. It begins at the Tennessee state line as a continuation of Caney Creek Road in Pickett County, Tennessee, quickly crosses the Clinton–Wayne county line and passes through the community of Sunnybrook, and follows the valley of Carpenter Fork north to Otter Creek, which the route crosses during a brief concurrency with KY 1009. KY 200 meets the south end of KY 834 at Hidalgo and leaves the Otter Creek valley. The highway passes through Shearer Valley and descends to meet KY 858 at Bethesda in the valley of Beaver Creek. KY 200 crosses that creek and Isbell Branch on its way to its northern terminus at KY 167 at Number One. The road is relatively narrow and winding, but is part of the shortest route from Interstate 40 at Crossville, Tennessee to Interstate 75 at Mount Vernon, Kentucky, via US 127 and Kentucky state highways 90, 1247, 914, 80 and 461.

== KY 202 ==
Kentucky Route 202
- Location: New Castle–Drennon Springs
- Length: 10.281 mi (16.546 km)

Kentucky Route 202 is a 10.281-mile-long (16.546 km) rural secondary highway in northern Henry County. The highway begins at US 421 (Campbellsburg Road) just north of New Castle. KY 202 heads northeast on Drennon Road, which descends into the valley of Drennon Creek at Delville. The highway crosses Emily Run Creek and Martini Run and meets the north end of KY 1360 (Franklinton Road) at Drennon Springs. KY 202 reaches its eastern terminus at KY 389 (River Road) at the confluence of Drennon Creek at the Kentucky River.

== KY 204 ==
Kentucky Route 204
- Location: Williamsburg–Clio
- Length: 13.099 mi (21.081 km)

Kentucky Route 204 is a 13.099-mile-long (21.081 km) highway with rural secondary and supplemental road sections in western Whitley County. The highway begins at KY 296 (Main Street) in the city of Williamsburg. KY 204 heads north as a rural secondary highway along Red Bird Road, which starts by running parallel to the southbound side of I-75. The highway veers away from the Interstate as it leaves the city; the route continues by paralleling the Cumberland River. KY 204 meets the north end of KY 3422 (Liberty School Road) at Liberty and the east end of KY 478 at Redbird. At KY 478, KY 204 turns north and crosses the Cumberland River. The highway meets the south end of KY 895 and parallels Sanders Creek north through an intersection with KY 1481. KY 204 meets the north end of KY 895 then turns east and descends into the valley of Youngs Creek. East of that creek, the highway ascends out of the valley and intersects US 25W (Cumberland Falls Highway) at Clio. KY 204 continues north as a supplemental road to the end of state maintenance north of Clio, where the highway continues as county-maintained Melton Harmon Road.

== KY 209 ==
Kentucky Route 209
- Location: Counts Crossroads
- Length: 2.374 mi (3.821 km)

Kentucky Route 209 is a 2.374-mile-long (3.821 km) rural secondary highway in central Carter County. The highway begins at US 60 north of Counts Crossroads. KY 209 heads north along Cascade Road, which curves east as the route passes through a unit of Carter Caves State Resort Park. The highway reaches its terminus at KY 182 (Carter Caves Road).

== KY 214 ==
Kentucky Route 214
- Location: Otia–Peytonsburg
- Length: 15.621 mi (25.140 km)

Kentucky Route 214 is a 15.621-mile-long (25.140 km) rural secondary highway in eastern Monroe County and western Cumberland County. The highway begins at KY 100 (Center Point Road) west of Otia. KY 214 heads southeast along Turkey Neck Bend Road to Otia, where the highway crosses the Cumberland River on a free ferry. The route continues southeast through Coe. KY 214 meets the south end of KY 953 (Judio Road), crosses Murphy Branch, and passes through Raydure and Martinsburg before entering Cumberland County. The highway continues on Kettle Creek Road, which follows and crosses the namesake creek and also crosses Pruitt Branch before reaching the route's eastern terminus at KY 61 (Celina Road) north of Peytonsburg.

== KY 215 ==
Kentucky Route 215
- Location: Evarts–Dizney
- Length: 5.636 mi (9.070 km)

Kentucky Route 215 is a 5.636-mile-long (9.070 km) rural secondary highway in central Harlan County. The highway begins at KY 38 (Main Street) in the city of Evarts. KY 215 begins with a short one-way pair; westbound KY 215 follows Bridge Street, eastbound KY 215 follows Yocum Street, and both directions follow Yocum Street east of their intersection. The highway follows Yocum Creek upstream out of the city. KY 215 passes through Woods and Redbud on its way to Kenvir, where the route has an intersection with KY 2429 (Black Mountain Road). The highway continues east along the Yocum Creek valley through Black Mountain and Dizney. Beyond Dizney, KY 3458 continues along Yocum while KY 215 continues along Turner Creek to the end of state maintenance 0.120 miles (0.193 km) beyond the KY 3458 intersection.

== KY 216 ==
Kentucky Route 216
- Location: Hestand–Vernon
- Length: 9.611 mi (15.467 km)

Kentucky Route 216 is a 9.611-mile-long (15.467 km) highway with rural secondary and supplemental road sections in southeastern Monroe County. The highway begins at KY 163 (Celina Road) at Hestand. KY 216 heads east along Vernon Road. The highway's classification changes from rural secondary to supplemental road at Meredith Creek Road. KY 216 continues southeast along Little McFarland Creek to Vernon, where the highway curves south and crosses McFarland Creek at its confluence with the Cumberland River. KY 216 parallels the river south to the Tennessee state line, where the road continues as unnumbered Proctor Creek Road.

== KY 217 ==
Kentucky Route 217
- Location: Hutch–Cubage
- Length: 8.789 mi (14.145 km)

Kentucky Route 217 is a 8.789-mile-long (14.145 km) rural secondary highway in eastern Bell County. The highway begins at KY 988 west of Hutch. KY 217 heads east through the valley of Clear Fork, where the highway passes through Hutch and meets the south end of KY 1344. The highway follows the creek to its headwaters then heads north and descends to the valley of Cubage Creek, which the route follows to its terminus at KY 987 northwest of Cubage.

== KY 219 ==
Kentucky Route 219
- Location: Twila–Wallins Creek
- Length: 5.141 mi (8.274 km)

Kentucky Route 219 is a 5.141-mile-long (8.274 km) rural secondary highway in western Harlan County. The highway begins at a dead end south of Twila. KY 219 heads north along the valley of Wallins Creek through the community of Kentenia, where the route meets the spur route KY 3450. The highway crosses Camp Branch and passes through South Wallins. KY 219 meets the east end of KY 2007, intersects a CSX rail line, and crosses the Cumberland River into the village of Wallins Creek at the creek's confluence with the river. The highway turns west at its junction with KY 3461 to its terminus at US 119.

== KY 222 ==
Kentucky Route 222
- Location: Hansbrough–Hodgenville
- Length: 15.796 mi (25.421 km)

Kentucky Route 222 is a 15.976-mile-long (25.711 km) rural secondary highway in southern Hardin County and western LaRue County. The highway begins at US 62 (Leitchfield Road) east of Hansbrough. KY 222 heads east along Glendale Road, which crosses over the Western Kentucky Parkway. The highway meets the south end of KY 1904 (Bacon Creek Road) and crosses Middle Creek. KY 222 continues through the village of Glendale, where the route intersects KY 1136 (New Glendale Road) and a CSX rail line. East of Glendale, the highway has a diamond interchange with I-65 and intersects US 31W (Dixie Highway) at Glendale Junction. KY 222 crosses Jackson Branch, meets the south end of KY 1135 (Roundtop Road), and crosses Middle Creek into LaRue County. The highway follows a circuitous path before crossing the North Fork of the Nolin River and reaching its eastern terminus at KY 84 (Tanner Road) west of Hodgenville.

== KY 223 ==
Kentucky Route 223
- Location: Baughman–Scalf
- Length: 16.774 mi (26.995 km)

Kentucky Route 223 is a 16.774-mile-long (26.995 km) rural secondary highway in eastern Knox County. The highway begins at US 25E south of Baughman. KY 223 follows Stinking Creek northeast; the route crosses Mud Lick Creek and one of the ends of the spur route KY 2409. At Dewitt, the highway meets the west end of KY 718 and heads north upstream along the Road Fork of Stinking Creek. KY 223 continues north to Hammond, where the route meets the end of the spur route KY 2406 and curves east as it leaves the valley of the Road Fork. The highway veers south as it enters the valley of the Middle Fork of Stinking Creek. KY 223 continues south through Scalf to its terminus at KY 718 where the Middle Fork meets the mainstem of Stinking Creek.

== KY 230 ==
Kentucky Route 230
- Location: Concordia
- Length: 4.747 mi (7.640 km)

Kentucky Route 230 is a 4.747-mile-long (7.640 km) rural secondary highway in western Meade County. The highway begins at KY 144 (Rhodelia Road) southwest of Concordia. KY 230 heads northeast on Riverview Road, which comes close to the Ohio River and crosses Spring Creek. In the village of Concordia, the highway turns south at its intersection with KY 3139 (Concordia Road) and follows Concordia Road to another intersection with KY 144 southeast of the village.

== KY 232 ==
Kentucky Route 232
- Location: Kingswood
- Length: 1.102 mi (1.773 km)

Kentucky Route 232 is a 1.102-mile-long (1.773 km) supplemental road in southern Breckinridge County. The highway begins at KY 79 and KY 259 and heads east through the village of Kingswood. KY 232 ends east of the village at the end of state maintenance, where Kingswood Orchard Road continues.

== KY 233 ==
Kentucky Route 233
- Location: Dishman Springs–McHargue
- Length: 9.516 mi (15.315 km)

Kentucky Route 233 is a 9.516-mile-long (15.315 km) rural secondary highway in northern Knox County and southern Laurel County. The highway begins at KY 6 west of Dishman Springs. KY 233 heads north along Big Indian Road along Big Indian Creek to the creek's headwaters. The highway then descends along Rossland Road into the valley of the East Fork of Lynn Camp Creek, where the route intersects a CSX rail line at Rossland and follows the creek and rail line to Gray. At Gray, KY 233 meets the east ends of KY 2408 (Dr. Jones Lane) and KY 1232 (Barbourville Road). On the north edge of the village, the highway has a superstreet intersection with US 25E (Cumberland Gap Parkway); traffic on KY 233 must turn right, U-turn, and turn right away to continue on the state route. KY 233 continues north and crosses Hazel Fork Creek before entering Laurel County. The highway crosses Little Robinson Creek and reaches its northern terminus at KY 830 (Robinson Creek Road) southeast of McHargue.

== KY 235 ==
Kentucky Route 235
- Location: Trimble–Nancy
- Length: 6.902 mi (11.108 km)

Kentucky Route 235 is a 6.902-mile-long (11.108 km) rural secondary highway in western Pulaski County. The highway begins at Clark Road on the Mill Springs peninsula near Lake Cumberland. KY 235 heads north through the hamlets of Trimble, Hislope, and Delmer. The highway meets the north end of KY 761 before reaching its northern terminus at KY 80 at Nancy.

== KY 238 ==
Kentucky Route 238
- Location: Big Reedy–Bee Spring
- Length: 13.420 mi (21.597 km)
- Existed: 1937–present

Kentucky Route 238 is a 13.420-mile-long (21.597 km) rural secondary highway in northern Edmonson County.

=== Route description ===
The highway begins at KY 185 (Caneyville Road) at Big Reedy. KY 238 heads west along Big Reedy Road, which turns north and parallels Big Reedy Creek after crossing it the first time. The highway turns east after crossing the West Fork of Reedy Creek and crosses Big Reedy Creek again immediately before its second junction with KY 185. KY 238 briefly runs concurrently with KY 185 before splitting east onto Sunfish School Road, which the route follows east to KY 187 (Sunfish Road). KY 238 and KY 187 run concurrently north across Sunfish Creek and meet the south end of KY 2330 (Sunfish–Sunny Point Road). At Sunfish, KY 238 splits east onto Sunfish–Bee Spring Road. The highway crosses Bear Creek before reaching its eastern terminus at KY 259 at Bee Spring.

=== History ===
KY 238 began solely as an access road to Big Reedy Lake. In 1937, KY 238 was designated onto the roadway to the lake, expanded to include Sunfish School Road, which would connect Big Reedy Lake with the KY 187 corridor, as well as another extension to serve as a loop that goes back to KY 185. Between 1937 and 1958, KY 238 was expanded once again to run concurrent with KY 187, and use Sunfish-Bee Spring Road to connect with KY 259 at Bee Spring, sometime between 1960 and 1977.

== KY 240 ==
Kentucky Route 240
- Location: Petros–Allen Springs
- Length: 19.871 mi (31.979 km)

Kentucky Route 240 is a 19.871-mile-long (31.979 km) rural secondary highway in and southern Warren County and far western Allen County. The highway begins at US 68 and KY 80, which run concurrently on Russellville Road, between Petros and the Warren–Logan county line. KY 240 heads south on Petros Road, which meets the east end of KY 3172 (Shaker Museum Road) and intersects an R.J. Corman Railroad Group rail line. The highway crosses Brush Creek on its way to Woodburn, where the route intersects US 31W (Nashville Road). KY 240 continues through the village as Woodburn–Allen Springs Road, which meets the south end of KY 884 (Three Springs Road) and intersects a CSX rail line. At Matlock, the highway crosses over I-65 with no access. West of Drake, KY 240 briefly runs concurrently with KY 622 (Plano Road) and crosses Drakes Creek. The highway continues through Boyce and crosses Trammel Creek at the Warren–Warren county line. KY 240 curve northeast and meets the west end of KY 3241 (Bowling Green Road) before reaching its eastern terminus at US 231 (Veterans Memorial Highway) at Allen Springs.

== KY 243 ==
Kentucky Route 243
- Location: Peytons Store–Gravel Switch
- Length: 12.257 mi (19.726 km)

Kentucky Route 243 is a 12.257-mile-long (19.726 km) rural secondary highway in northern Casey County, southwestern Boyle County, and eastern Marion County. The highway begins at KY 78 in the valley of Big South Fork of Rolling Fork. KY 243 heads north out of the valley of Big South Fork and descends into the valley of Little South Fork, which the route follows west and north to a junction with KY 37 (Forkland Road) just north of the Casey–Boyle county line at the confluence of Little South Fork and North Rolling Fork. KY 243 heads northwest to a junction with KY 1856 (Scrubgrass Road), crosses Wards Branch, and follows North Rolling Fork into Marion County. The highway curves north and meets the east end of KY 337 (Bradfordsville–Gravel Switch Road) south of Gravel Switch before reaching its northern terminus at US 68 (Danville Highway) north of Gravel Switch.

== KY 244 ==
Kentucky Route 244
- Location: Russell–Raceland
- Length: 3.654 mi (5.881 km)

Kentucky Route 244 is a 3.654-mile-long (5.881 km) rural secondary highway in eastern Greenup County. The highway begins at an intersection in the city of Russell. KY 244 spirals and curves left to cross US 23, then immediately crosses over the CSX rail line that follows the left bank of the river over the Russell Viaduct. KY 244 passes through Russell on Belfonte Street. Within the city's main street grid, the highway intersects Ferry Street, which heads west as KY 2543. At the north end of town, at the east end of the Russell Railroad Yard, KY 244 veers onto Vernon Street, which follows the left bank of the river. The highway continues into the city of Worthington along Prospect Street then turns onto Stewart Street. At the south end of Stewart Street, KY 244 passes through a 0.135-mile-long (0.217 km) tunnel and then a 0.045-mile-long (0.072 km) tunnel under the rail yard; the route enters the city of Raceland within the first tunnel. The highway exits the second tunnel onto Pond Run Road and reaches its terminus at KY 3105 (Greenup Avenue). Pond Run Road continues south from the intersection as KY 750, which intersects US 23.

=== History ===
KY 244 was formed in 1945. KY 244 was routed to northwest routing over from US 23 to cross the CSX rail line. The intersection with US 23 was rebuilt in 2016 for the new Ironton-Russell Bridge. In 2021, KY 244 was rerouted with a new Russell Viaduct replacing the old Russell Viaduct.

The original route for KY 244 is unknown.

== KY 246 ==
Kentucky Route 246
- Location: Ebenezer–Beechmont
- Length: 3.770 mi (6.067 km)

Kentucky Route 246 is a 3.770-mile-long (6.067 km) rural secondary highway in eastern Muhlenberg County. The highway begins at KY 176 at Ebenezer. KY 246 heads south along Merle Travis Highway toward Beech Creek, where the route meets the east end of KY 1163. The highway continues east and crosses Beech Creek before reaching its eastern terminus at US 431 at Beechmont.

== KY 247 ==
Kentucky Route 247
- Location: Howardstown–Culvertown
- Length: 14.244 mi (22.923 km)

Kentucky Route 247 is a 14.244-mile-long (22.923 km) rural secondary highway in southern Nelson County. The highway begins at KY 84 (Stiles Road) in Howardstown. KY 247 heads north along Howardstown Road through the valley of Rolling Fork, which parallels the highway to the west. The highway crosses Lunar Creek and Pottinger Creek within the valley. KY 247 intersects the rail line of the Kentucky Railroad Museum immediately before its junction with KY 52 (New Hope Road) east of New Haven. The two highways run concurrently east to Gethsemane, where KY 247 splits onto Monks Road. KY 247 follows that road north to its northern terminus at US 31E in Culvertown.

== KY 250 ==
Kentucky Route 250
- Location: Calhoun–Tichenor
- Length: 6.943 mi (11.174 km)

Kentucky Route 250 is a 6.943-mile-long (11.174 km) rural secondary highway in eastern McLean County. The highway begins at KY 136 near McLean County High School east of Calhoun. KY 250 heads east and briefly runs concurrently with KY 1046 west of Hanley Creek. The highway intersects KY 798 east of Buel and meets the south end of KY 2437 (Hatfield Stevens Road) east of the West Fork of Buck Creek. KY 250 meets the north end of KY 1080 before reaching its eastern terminus at US 431 at Tichenor.

== KY 253 ==
Kentucky Route 253
- Location: Cecilia–Saint John
- Length: 3.153 mi (5.074 km)

Kentucky Route 253 is a 3.153-mile-long (5.074 km) rural secondary highway in western Hardin County. The highway begins at KY 86 (Hardinsburg Road) west of Cecilia. KY 253 heads northwest along Bethlehem Academy Road parallel to West Rhudes Creek to its northern terminus at KY 1357 (St. John Road) west of Saint John.

== KY 254 ==
Kentucky Route 254
- Location: Madisonville–Sacramento
- Length: 16.726 mi (26.918 km)

Kentucky Route 254 is a 16.726-mile-long (26.918 km) rural secondary highway in eastern Hopkins County and western McLean County. The highway begins at KY 70 (Anton Road) within that route's diamond interchange with I-69 (Pennyrile Parkway) in the city of Madisonville. The northbound exit ramp forms the south leg of the KY 70–KY 254 intersection, and access from KY 70 to northbound I-69 is provided via a ramp from KY 254. KY 254 heads north along Brown Road, which passes under a CSX rail line, meets the west end of KY 892 (Gill Field Road), and crosses the South and Middle forks of Elk Creek as the route leaves Madisonville. The highway crosses the mainstem of Elk Creek between intersections with the east ends of KY 2281 (Carriage Lane) and KY 2338 (Carroll Gentry Road). KY 254 briefly runs concurrently with KY 862 (Lenin Road and Casner Road) across the North Fork of Elk Creek and meets the east end of KY 260 (Eastlawn Road) before curving east and crossing the Pond River into McLean County. The highway meets the south end of KY 1155 on its way to Sacramento. KY 254 enters Sacramento from the northwest and curves east onto Second Street before reaching its terminus at Main Street, which carries KY 81 and KY 85.

== KY 256 ==
Kentucky Route 256
- Location: Beech Grove–Calhoun
- Length: 10.542 mi (16.966 km)

Kentucky Route 256 is a 10.542-mile-long (16.966 km) rural secondary highway in western McLean County. The highway begins at KY 56 and KY 136 at Beech Grove. KY 256 heads south then curves east at its junction with the spur route KY 1587 north of Wrightsburg. The highway meets the south end of KY 797 just west of Yellow Creek north of Lemon and meets the south end of KY 140 at Poverty. KY 256 crosses Long Creek and enters the city of Calhoun, where the highway follows First Street along the right bank of the Green River and under KY 81's bridge across the river. The highway turns north onto Main Street for one block before reaching its eastern terminus at KY 81, which heads west along Veterans Memorial Drive to the bridge and north along Main Street.

== KY 257 ==
Kentucky Route 257
- Location: Hyden–Confluence
- Length: 11.030 mi (17.751 km)

Kentucky Route 257 is a 11.030-mile-long (17.751 km) rural secondary highway in northern Leslie County. The highway begins at US 421 and KY 80 (Main Street) in the city of Hyden on the west side of the Middle Fork Kentucky River. KY 257 heads north along Dryhill Road, which crosses Rockhouse Creek and follows the left bank of the river. At Dryhill, the highway meets the east end of KY 3424 (Bull Creek Road), crosses Bull Creek, passes under the Hal Rogers Parkway's bridge across the Middle Fork Kentucky River, and meets the west end of a bridge across the river that leads to KY 3425. KY 257 continues north, crossing Hell for Certain Creek before reaching its northern terminus at the end of state maintenance at Confluence, the confluence of Wilder Branch and the river and where the river widens into Buckhorn Lake.

== KY 258 ==
Kentucky Route 258
- Location: Beech Grove–Saint Joseph
- Length: 10.156 mi (16.344 km)

Kentucky Route 258 is a 10.156-mile-long (16.344 km) rural secondary highway in western McLean County and western Daviess County. The highway begins at KY 56 north of Beech Grove. KY 258 heads northwest along a curvaceous path to KY 593, with which the route runs concurrently to near Delaware Creek. KY 258 heads north toward the Green River at the Daviess County line. The highway veers away from the river and crosses Delaware Creek at Delaware. KY 258 crosses Knob Lick Creek before reaching its terminus at KY 56 west of Saint Joseph.

== KY 260 ==
Kentucky Route 260
- Location: West Hanson–Hanson
- Length: 5.396 mi (8.684 km)

Kentucky Route 260 is a 5.396-mile-long (8.684 km) rural secondary highway in northern Hopkins County. The highway begins at KY 1069 (Stagecoach Road) at West Hanson. KY 262 heads east along Sunset Road into the city of Hanson. In the Hanson Historic District, the route intersects a CSX rail line and US 41 (Hanson Road). KY 260 continues along Veterans Drive to a diamond interchange with I-69 (Pennyrile Parkway) and crosses Otter Creek. The highway leaves the city along Eastlawn Road, which intersects KY 281 (Island Ford Road) before reaching its eastern terminus at KY 254 (Brown Road).

== KY 262 ==
Kentucky Route 262
- Location: Madisonville
- Length: 4.753 mi (7.649 km)

Kentucky Route 262 is a 4.753-mile-long (7.649 km) supplemental road on the west side of Madisonville in central Hopkins County. The highway begins at a mutual terminus with north–south KY 630 (Columbia Schoolhouse Road) west of Madisonville. KY 262 heads east along Laffoon Trail, which passes under a rail line serving the adjacent coal mine and crosses Pogue Creek. The highway intersects a spur from an east–west CSX rail line and crosses Greasy Creek into the city of Madisonville, where the route follows Center Street. KY 262 continues into the Madisonville Commercial Historic District, where the route intersects a north–south CSX rail line immediately before reaching its eastern terminus at US 41 (Main Street). Center Street continues as eastbound KY 70, part of that route's one-way pair east from US 41.

== KY 263 ==
Kentucky Route 263
- Location: Richardsville–Riverside
- Length: 14.421 mi (23.208 km)

Kentucky Route 263 is a 14.421-mile-long (23.208 km) rural secondary highway in northern Warren County.

=== Route description ===
The highway begins at KY 185 southeast of Richardsville. KY 263 heads northwest along Richardsville Road, which passes through the village and meets the east end of KY 2631 (Benleo Road). The highway continues northwest until Riverside, where the highway leaves Richardsville Road and turns onto Riverside–Benleo Road. KY 263 crosses Claylick Creek and meets the other end of KY 2631, which uses Riverside–Benleo Road while KY 263 turns west onto Ridge Road. The highway follows that road to its northern terminus at county-maintained Richardsville Road near the confluence of the Green River and the Barren River.

=== History ===
KY 263 formerly connected to the Woodbury area in Butler County via a toll ferry across the Barren River near its confluence with the Green River. Once entering Butler County, KY 263 went further west into Woodbury, then the route followed what is now KY 403 to KY 71 (now US Route 231) in Morgantown. KY 263's original course in Butler County totaled 4.1 miles (6.6 km). The ferry was decommissioned sometime in 1963. After the ferry was discontinued, KY 263's western terminus was truncated to its current location.

== KY 264 ==
Kentucky Route 264
- Location: Providence–Slaughters
- Existed: by 1962

Kentucky Route 264 ran from US 41 Alternate in Providence northeast to KY 138 northeast of Slaughters. By 1962, the road was decommissioned, with KY 120 being extended east from Providence over this road and former KY 1276 and KY 283 extended south from KY 132 (this section is now Catesville-Providence Road), KY 495 (now Breton Road) being extended south, and the remainder was renumbered KY 1835 (which was extended when KY 495 was decommissioned) because of I-264.

== KY 265 ==
Kentucky Route 265
- Location: near Franklin–near Scottsville
- Existed: September 29, 1988

Kentucky Route 265 is the former designation for KY 585.

== KY 266 ==
Kentucky Route 266
- Location: Smith Mills–Rock Springs
- Length: 8.304 mi (13.364 km)

Kentucky Route 266 is a 8.304-mile-long (13.364 km) rural secondary highway in western Henderson County. The highway begins at KY 136 at Smith Mills. KY 266 heads southeast and crosses a branch of Highland Creek and Rock Creek. The highway turns south to parallel the west city limit of Corydon, then the highway turns east and passes through town on Second Street. In the center of town, KY 266 intersects US 60 (Main Street). At the east end of Corydon, the highway curves north to parallel the east city limit, then the route continues southeast to its terminus at US 41 Alt. at Rock Springs.

== KY 268 ==
Kentucky Route 268
- Location: Geneva
- Length: 7.835 mi (12.609 km)

Kentucky Route 268 is a 7.835-mile-long (12.609 km) rural secondary highway in western Henderson County. The highway begins at KY 136 at Geneva. KY 268 heads northwest through the bottomlands of the Ohio River. The highway has a pair of right-angle turns in Sloughs Wildlife Management Area before reaching its northern terminus at another intersection with KY 136.

== KY 269 ==
Kentucky Route 269
- Location: Logansport–Prentiss
- Length: 11.670 mi (18.781 km)

Kentucky Route 269 is a 11.670-mile-long (18.781 km) rural secondary highway in northern Butler County and southern Ohio County. The highway begins at KY 403 (Logansport Road) south of Logansport. KY 269 heads west along Reeds Ferry Road to the Green River, where the route crosses the river on a free county ferry. The highway continues west and crosses Thoroughfare Creek into Ohio County at Shultztown. KY 269 heads north along Prentiss Road along Slaty Creek, including crossing the creek at Prentiss, to the route's northern terminus at US 231.

== KY 270 ==
Kentucky Route 270
- Location: Henshaw–Jolly
- Length: 27.535 mi (44.313 km)

Kentucky Route 270 is a 27.535-mile-long (44.313 km) rural secondary highway in southern Union County and western Webster County. The highway begins at KY 130 east of Henshaw. KY 270 heads southeast and runs concurrently with KY 492 southeast of Henshaw. The highway briefly runs concurrently with US 60 north of Sturgis, crosses Smith Ditch, and crosses Bishop Ditch during its concurrency with KY 141. KY 270 crosses Bordley Ditch before entering Webster County. The highway meets the north end of KY 2837 at Hearin and the south end of KY 2838 east of there. KY 270 continues south across Caney Fork and Mitchell Ditch and runs concurrently with KY 132 northeast of Clay. The highway crosses Crab Orchard Creek and several branches of the creek on its way to Lisman, where the route receives the north end of KY 293 and the east end of KY 874. KY 270 reaches its eastern terminus at US 41 Alt. south of Jolly.

== KY 271 ==
Kentucky Route 271
- Location: Utility–Hawesville
- Length: 4.581 mi (7.372 km)

Kentucky Route 271 is a 4.581-mile-long (7.372 km) rural secondary highway in western Hancock County. The highway begins at KY 1389 at Utility. KY 271 heads north and east and curves north through its junction with KY 1847. The highway continues to its terminus at US 60 next to Hancock County High School northwest of Hawesville.

== KY 273 ==
Kentucky Route 273
- Location: Beaver Dam
- Length: 3.440 mi (5.536 km)

Kentucky Route 273 is a 3.440-mile-long (5.536 km) rural secondary highway in central Ohio County. The highway begins at KY 69 west of Beaver Dam. The highway follows Goshen Road, which crosses Lick Branch, to the city of Beaver Dam. In the city, KY 273 follows Seventh Street to the route's eastern terminus at US 62 and US 231 (Main Street).

== KY 274 ==
Kentucky Route 274
- Location: Cadiz–Confederate
- Length: 16.716 mi (26.902 km)

Kentucky Route 274 is a 16.716-mile-long (26.902 km) rural secondary highway in northern Trigg County and southern Lyon County. The highway begins at US 68 Bus. (Canton Road) opposite the north end of KY 1175 (Old Dover Road) southwest of the city of Cadiz. KY 274 heads northwest along Rockcastle Road, which crosses the Little River arm of Lake Barkley north of Cedar Point and Dyers Creek at the head of that creek's arm of the reservoir. The highway passes to the east of the lakeside communities of Rockcastle, Rockcastle Shores, and Blue Water Estates. KY 274 meets the west end of KY 276 (Hurricane Road) and crosses Hurricane Creek before entering Lyon County. The highway passes by the heads of the arms of Lake Barkley formed by Mottley Creek, Dryden Creek, and McNabb Creek and passes through Dryden Estates before reaching its northern terminus at KY 93 at Confederate.

== KY 275 ==
Kentucky Route 275
- Location: Deane-Hemphill
- Existed: by 1962

Kentucky Route 275 ran from KY 7 in Deane to KY 317 in Hemphill. This became part of rerouted KY 317 by 1962 because of I-275; the old route of KY 317 is now Yonts Fork.

== KY 276 ==
Kentucky Route 276
- Location: Rockcastle–Cadiz
- Length: 17.619 mi (28.355 km)

Kentucky Route 276 is a 17.619-mile-long (28.355 km) rural secondary highway in northern Trigg County and southern Caldwell County. The highway begins at KY 274 (Rockcastle Road) north of Rockcastle. KY 276 heads east on Hurricane Road, which parallels Hurricane Creek and crosses the Gillespie and Oliver branches of the creek. The highway leaves the creek at its second junction with KY 778 (Will Jackson Road), with which the route runs concurrently. KY 276 joins KY 139 (Princeton Road) north to the Trigg–Caldwell–Lyon county tripoint at Black Hawk. From there, KY 139 heads north on Cadiz Road in Caldwell County, KY 93 heads west into Lyon County, and KY 276 heads east on Blackhawk Road in Caldwell County. The highway crosses Long Pond Branch and passes under I-24 before re-entering Trigg County. At Wallonia, KY 276 runs concurrently with KY 128 (Wallonia Road) across Muddy Fork Branch of the Little River and heads south along Rocky Ridge Road, which intersects KY 124 (Cerulean Road) and meets the west end of KY 958 (Montgomery Church Road). The highway crosses over I-24 again—the north and south frontage roads are KY 6053 and KY 6052—before reaching its eastern terminus at US 68 and KY 80 (Hopkinsville Road) opposite the north end of KY 1585 (North Montgomery Road) at the east end of the city of Cadiz.

== KY 277 ==
Kentucky Route 277
- Location: Central City
- Length: 3.802 mi (6.119 km)

Kentucky Route 277 is a 3.802-mile-long (6.119 km) supplemental road in Central City in central Muhlenberg County. The highway begins in the southwestern part of the city at Everly Brothers Boulevard, which carries US 62, US 431, and KY 70. KY 277 heads northeast along Reservoir Avenue. On the west side of downtown Central City, the highway passes under the Paducah & Louisville Railway and briefly runs concurrently with KY 304, which follows Front Street to the west and Broad Street to the east. KY 277 meets the east end of KY 2106 (Legion Drive), intersects at grade a CSX rail line, and intersects KY 1031 (Second Street). Near the northern edge of the city, the highway's name changes to River Road and the route meets the south end of KY 602. KY 277 meets the east end of KY 3038 (Prison Road) across from the Green River Correctional Complex. The highway leaves Central City and reaches its northern terminus at an intersection with county-maintained River Road, which also serves as the western terminus of KY 1379.

== KY 278 ==
Kentucky Route 278
- Location: Princeton–Friendship
- Length: 7.601 mi (12.233 km)

Kentucky Route 278 is a 7.601-mile-long (12.233 km) supplemental road in eastern Caldwell County. The highway officially begins at the intersection of Highland Avenue and Lakeshore Drive on the east side of the city of Princeton; the route might extend west on Highland Avenue to KY 91 (Hopkinsville Street). KY 278 heads south on Lakeshore Drive and east on Sandlick Road out of the city. North of Scottsburg, the highway meets the north end of KY 1603 (Scottsburg Road) and crosses over the Paducah & Louisville Railway. KY 278 reaches its eastern terminus at KY 672 north of Friendship.

== KY 279 ==
Kentucky Route 279
- Location: West Louisville–Griffith
- Length: 14.078 mi (22.656 km)

Kentucky Route 279 is a 14.078-mile-long (22.656 km) rural secondary highway in western Daviess County. The highway begins at KY 815 south of West Louisville. KY 279 heads north and crosses Old Panther Creek and Panther Creek on its way to KY 56, which the route joins heading west in a concurrency to Sorgho. The highway splits from KY 56 and crosses Rhodes Creek and the Audubon Parkway. KY 279 crosses Katie Meadows Slough just north of its intersection with US 60. The highway intersects a CSX rail line at Griffith then, as the route approaches the Ohio River, turns west at Lower River Road and reaches its northern terminus at the end of state maintenance at Wimsatt Road and French Island Road.

== KY 280 ==
Kentucky Route 280
- Location: Murray–New Concord
- Length: 12.552 mi (20.200 km)

Kentucky Route 280 is a 12.552-mile-long (20.200 km) rural secondary highway in eastern Calloway County. The highway begins east of Murray at KY 94. KY 280 heads east along Pottertown Road, which meets the northern end of KY 1536 (Outland School Road) and passes through Pottertown. After crossing Wildcat Creek, the highway turns south onto Speaker Trail and passes to the west of an arm of Kentucky Lake. The highway crosses a branch of Panther Creek and meets the east end of KY 1536 (Douglas Road). KY 280 continues south across Panther Creek and Goose Creek before reaching its terminus at KY 121 west of New Concord.

== KY 282 ==
Kentucky Route 282
- Location: Calvert City–Gilbertsville
- Length: 5.467 mi (8.798 km)

Kentucky Route 282 is a 5.467-mile-long (8.798 km) rural secondary highway in northeastern Marshall County. The highway begins at KY 95 (Main Street) in Calvert City. KY 282 heads east along Gilbertsville Highway, which intersects KY 1523 (Industrial Parkway) at the east city limit of Calvert City. The highway continues through the village of Gilbertsville and passes under I-24 and I-69. As KY 282 approaches the Tennessee River, the route turns south and passes through Kentucky Dam Village State Resort Park. The highway passes under a rail line before reaching its terminus at a partial cloverleaf interchange with US 62 and US 641, which run concurrently northeast across the river just north of Kentucky Dam. US 62 and US 641 head west and south, respectively, from the interchange.

== KY 283 ==
Kentucky Route 283
- Location: Ortiz–Robards
- Length: 13.542 mi (21.794 km)

Kentucky Route 283 is a 13.542-mile-long (21.794 km) rural secondary highway in northern Webster County and southern Henderson County. The highway begins at KY 132 west of Ortiz. KY 283 heads north, meets the east end of KY 1191, and crosses Knob Lick Creek. The highway crosses a branch of Knob Lick Creek before intersecting KY 56 west of Pratt. KY 283 enters Henderson County, crosses Groves Creek, and intersects KY 416 at the west end of the city of Robards. The highway intersects a CSX rail line and reaches its northern terminus at US 41 north of Robards.

== KY 285 ==
Kentucky Route 285
- Location: Henderson
- Length: 2.732 mi (4.397 km)

Kentucky Route 285 is a 2.732-mile-long (4.397 km) rural secondary highway in central Henderson County. The highway begins south of Henderson at US 41 Alt. just north of the alternate U.S. Highway's intersection with KY 425 (Henderson Bypass). KY 285 heads northeast along Old Madisonville Road, which meets the north end of KY 1299 and crosses Seller's Ditch. The highway enters the city of Henderson and crosses Canoe Creek. KY 285 has a grade crossing of a rail line before reaching its northern terminus at KY 136 (Madison Street).

== KY 287 ==
Kentucky Route 287
- Location: Bennettstown–Peedee
- Length: 6.188 mi (9.959 km)

Kentucky Route 287 is a 6.188-mile-long (9.959 km) rural secondary highway in western Christian County. The highway begins at KY 107 (Lafayette Road) at Bennettstown. KY 287 heads northwest on Binns Mill Road, which crosses the Little River at Binns Mill before reaching its northern terminus at KY 164 (Newstead Road) at Peedee.

== KY 288 ==
Kentucky Route 288
- Location: Spring Hill–New Cypress
- Length: 6.117 mi (9.844 km)

Kentucky Route 288 is a 6.117-mile-long (9.844 km) rural secondary highway in northern Hickman County. The highway begins at a wye junction with US 51 west of Spring Hill. KY 288 meets the north end of KY 2206 and crosses Russell Creek at Spring Hill. The highway intersects KY 1362 west of New Cypress, passes through that hamlet, then curves south and reaches its eastern terminus at KY 703.

== KY 291 ==
Kentucky Route 291
- Location: Dalton
- Length: 6.302 mi (10.142 km)

Kentucky Route 291 is a 6.302-mile-long (10.142 km) rural secondary highway in western Hopkins County. The highway begins at KY 70 (Beulah Road) south of Dalton. KY 291 follows Dalton Road north to Dalton, where the route meets the east end of KY 1294 (Government Road). The highway continues east and then veers north to cross Lick Creek and head to its terminus at KY 109 (Rabbit Ridge Road).

== KY 294 ==
Kentucky Route 294
- Location: Guthrie
- Length: 2.909 mi (4.682 km)

Kentucky Route 294 is a 2.909-mile-long (4.682 km) supplemental road in southern Todd County. The highway begins at the Tennessee state line where Tylertown Road, which approaches the state line at a shallow angle from the southwest inside Montgomery County, begins to run on top of the state line. KY 294 follows Graysville Road along the state line, then curves north and then east to cross Spring Creek. The highway continues east to its terminus at KY 181 (Guthrie Road) at the west city limit of Guthrie.

== KY 295 ==
Kentucky Route 295
- Location: Kuttawa–Dycusburg
- Length: 11.237 mi (18.084 km)

Kentucky Route 295 is a 11.237-mile-long (18.084 km) rural secondary highway in northern Lyon County and southern Crittenden County. The highway begins at US 62, US 641, and KY 93 northwest of Kuttawa; KY 93 heads east concurrently with the U.S. Highways and west on its own from the opposite side of the intersection. KY 295 heads southeast along Lake Barkley Drive into the city of Kuttawa, where the highway follows the shore of an arm of Lake Barkley and then curves northeast along the shore of the lake proper. At the east end of the main city street grid, the highway curves north along an arm of the lake and crosses over I-24 and I-69 as it leaves the arm of the lake at the north end of the city. KY 295 passes through the edge of the city of Eddyville between the Interstate Highways and the route's underpass of the Paducah & Louisville Railway. The highway heads northwest and meets the west end of KY 1943 before crossing Livingston Creek into Crittenden County. KY 295 heads northwest to the Cumberland River at the village of Dycusburg, where at Walnut Street the highway has a mutual terminus with a segment of KY 70.

== KY 297 ==
Kentucky Route 297
- Location: Marion–Tolu
- Length: 11.043 mi (17.772 km)

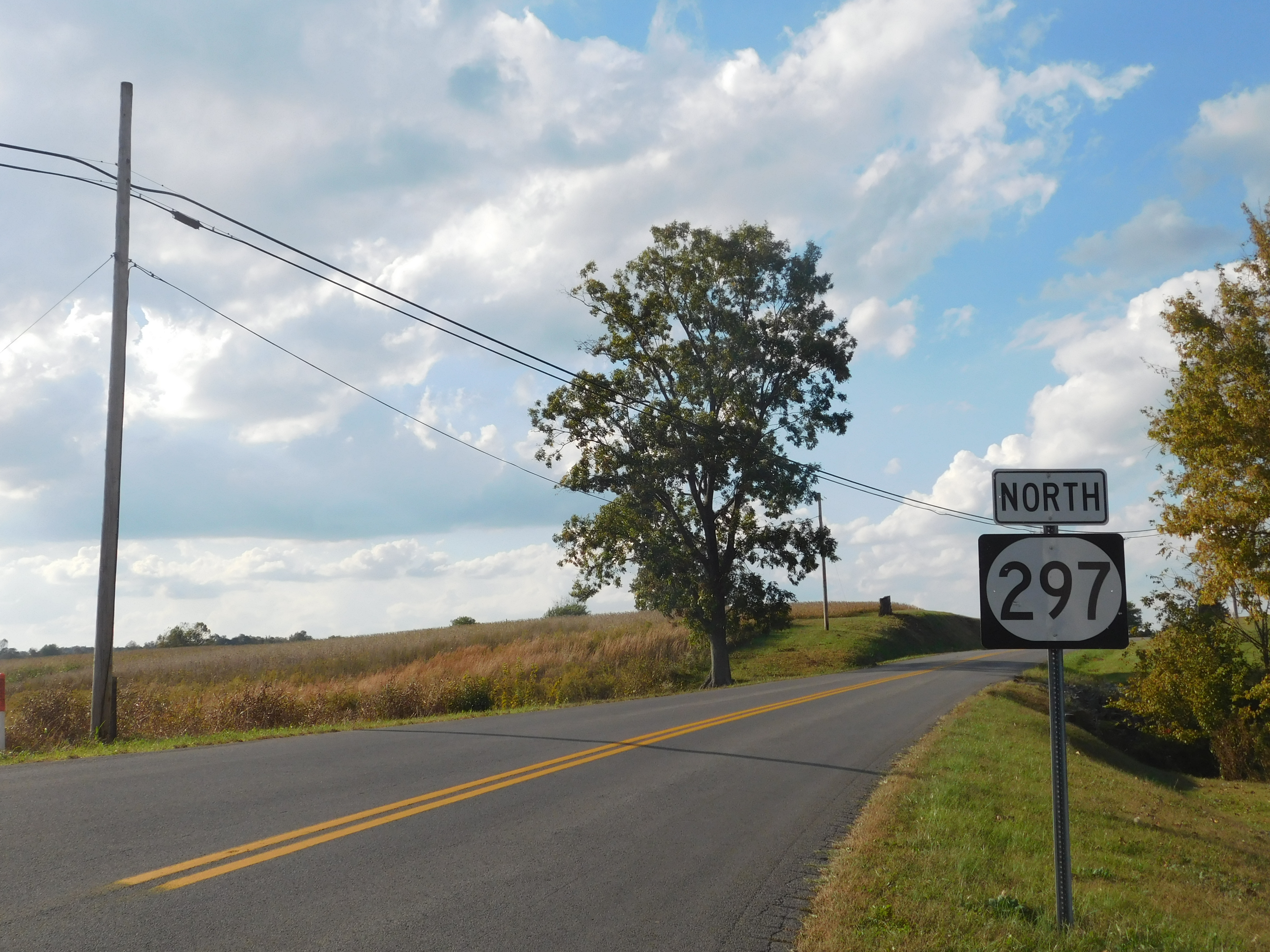
KY 297 in Crittenden County leaving US 60

Kentucky Route 297 is a 11.043-mile-long (17.772 km) rural secondary highway in northern Crittenden County. The highway begins at US 60 opposite the northern terminus of KY 2132 west of Marion. KY 297 heads northwest along a low ridge between the headwaters of several creeks. The highway meets the south end of KY 2123 south of Sheridan and the runs concurrently with KY 723 through Irma. KY 297 reaches its northern terminus at KY 135 opposite Elizabethtown Ferry Road west of Tolu.
