= Coxton, Kentucky =

Census-designated place in Kentucky, United States

- Census-designated place
- Location within Kentucky Location within the United States
- Coordinates: 36°51′26″N 83°16′13″W
- Country: United States
- State: Kentucky
- County: Harlan

Area
  - Total: 0.22 sq mi (0.57 km^{2})
  - Land: 0.21 sq mi (0.54 km^{2})
  - Water: 0.015 sq mi (0.04 km^{2})
- Elevation: 1,217 ft (371 m)

Population (2020)
  - Total: 176
  - Density: 850.2/sq mi (328.26/km^{2})
- Time zone: UTC-5 (Eastern time zone)
  - Summer (DST): UTC-4 (EDT)
- FIPS code: 21-17938
- GNIS feature ID: 490235

Coxton is an unincorporated coal town and census-designated place (CDP) in Harlan County, Kentucky, United States. Their post office is closed. The community was listed as a CDP in 2014, so no population figures are available from the 2010 census. As of the 2020 census, Coxton had a population of 176.

== Geography ==
Coxton is in central Harlan County in the valley of the Clover Fork of the Cumberland River. It is bordered by Blackjoe to the west and Brookside to the east, both unincorporated. Kentucky Route 38 runs along the southern edge of the Coxton CDP, across the Clover Fork from the center of town. KY 38 leads west down the Clover Fork valle 4 miles (6 km) to Harlan, the county seat, and east (upriver) 4.5 miles (7.2 km) to Evarts.

== Demographics ==
Historical population
Census	Pop.	Note	%±
2020	176		—
U.S. Decennial Census
