= Ages, Kentucky =

Census-designated place in Kentucky, United States

- Census-designated place
- Location within Kentucky Location within the United States
- Coordinates: 36°51′28″N 83°14′47″W
- Country: United States
- State: Kentucky
- County: Harlan

Area
  - Total: 0.57 sq mi (1.47 km^{2})
  - Land: 0.56 sq mi (1.44 km^{2})
  - Water: 0.012 sq mi (0.03 km^{2})
- Elevation: 1,325 ft (404 m)

Population (2020)
  - Total: 345
  - Density: 619.6/sq mi (239.24/km^{2})
- Time zone: UTC-5 (Eastern (EST))
  - Summer (DST): UTC-4 (EDT)
- ZIP code: 40801
- FIPS code: 21-00514
- GNIS feature ID: 485792

Ages is an unincorporated coal town and census-designated place (CDP) in Harlan County, Kentucky, United States. As of the 2020 census, Ages had a population of 345.

== History ==
A post office called "Ages" was established in 1892, and the post office removed to Brookside, Kentucky and its name changed to "Ages-Brookside" in 1975. The community takes its name from nearby Ages Creek.

The community was listed by the U.S. Census Bureau as a census-designated place in 2014. Population estimated at 439 in the 2017 US Census American Community Survey.

== Geography ==
Ages is located in central Harlan County in the valley of the Clover Fork of the Cumberland River. It is bordered to the west by Brookside and to the east by Verda, both unincorporated. The Clover Fork valley lies between Black Mountain to the north and Little Black Mountain to the south. Elevations in the area range from 1,245 feet (379 m) in the center of Ages, to 3,355 feet (1,023 m) on the closest summit of Black Mountain, to 3,380 feet (1,030 m) on the closest summit of Little Black Mountain. (Black Mountain continues east 20 miles (32 km) to its true summit, the highest point in Kentucky at 4,145 feet [1,263 m].)

Kentucky Route 38 is the main road through Ages, leading west down the Clover Fork valley 5 miles (8 km) to Harlan, the county seat, and east 3 miles (5 km) to Evarts.

== Demographics ==
Historical population
Census	Pop.	Note	%±
2020	345		—
U.S. Decennial Census
