= Kentucky Route 38 =

Highway in Kentucky

Kentucky Route 38
- KY 38 highlighted in red

Route information
- Maintained by KYTC
- Length: 29.519 mi (47.506 km)

Major junctions
- West end: US 421 in Harlan
- East end: SR 624 near Keokee, VA

Location
- Country: United States
- State: Kentucky
- Counties: Harlan

Highway system
- Kentucky State Highway System; Interstate; US; State; Parkways
← KY 37	→ KY 39

Kentucky Route 38, also known as KY 38, is a state highway in the U.S. state of Kentucky. Part of the State Secondary System, it runs east from U.S. Highway 421 in Harlan east via Brookside, Evarts, Benito, Black Bottom, and Holmes Mill to the Virginia state line. In Virginia, the road continues as secondary State Route 624 to Keokee; State Route 606 and primary State Route 68 provide access from Keokee to the town of Appalachia, Virginia.

== Major intersections ==
The entire route is in Harlan County.

Location	mi	km	Destinations	Notes
Harlan	0.000	0.000	US 421	Western terminus
Harlan	0.081	0.130	KY 72 (Main Street)	
	1.299	2.091	KY 3454 west (Maggie Lane)	Eastern terminus of KY 3454
Ages	4.949	7.965	KY 3455 south (Huffs Lane)	Northern terminus of KY 3455
Verda	6.613	10.643	KY 1601 south	Northern terminus of KY 1601
Evarts	7.871	12.667	KY 3457 north (Sals Branch Road)	Southern terminus of KY 3457
Evarts	8.155	13.124	KY 2430 east (Kelly Street)	Western terminus of KY 2430
Evarts	8.478	13.644	KY 215 east (Yocum Street)	Western terminus of KY 215
Louellen	17.002	27.362	KY 179 north	Southern terminus of KY 179
	29.474	47.434	SR 624 south	Eastern terminus
1.000 mi = 1.609 km; 1.000 km = 0.621 mi
