= Ages Brookside, Kentucky =

Ages Brookside, Kentucky is the name of a post office in Kentucky, United States. The post office is named for the following communities:

- Ages, Kentucky
- Brookside, Kentucky
