= Battle of Evarts =

1931 violence during a strike in Kentucky, US

- Date: May 5, 1931
- Location: Evarts, Kentucky, United States
- Outcome: Four deaths

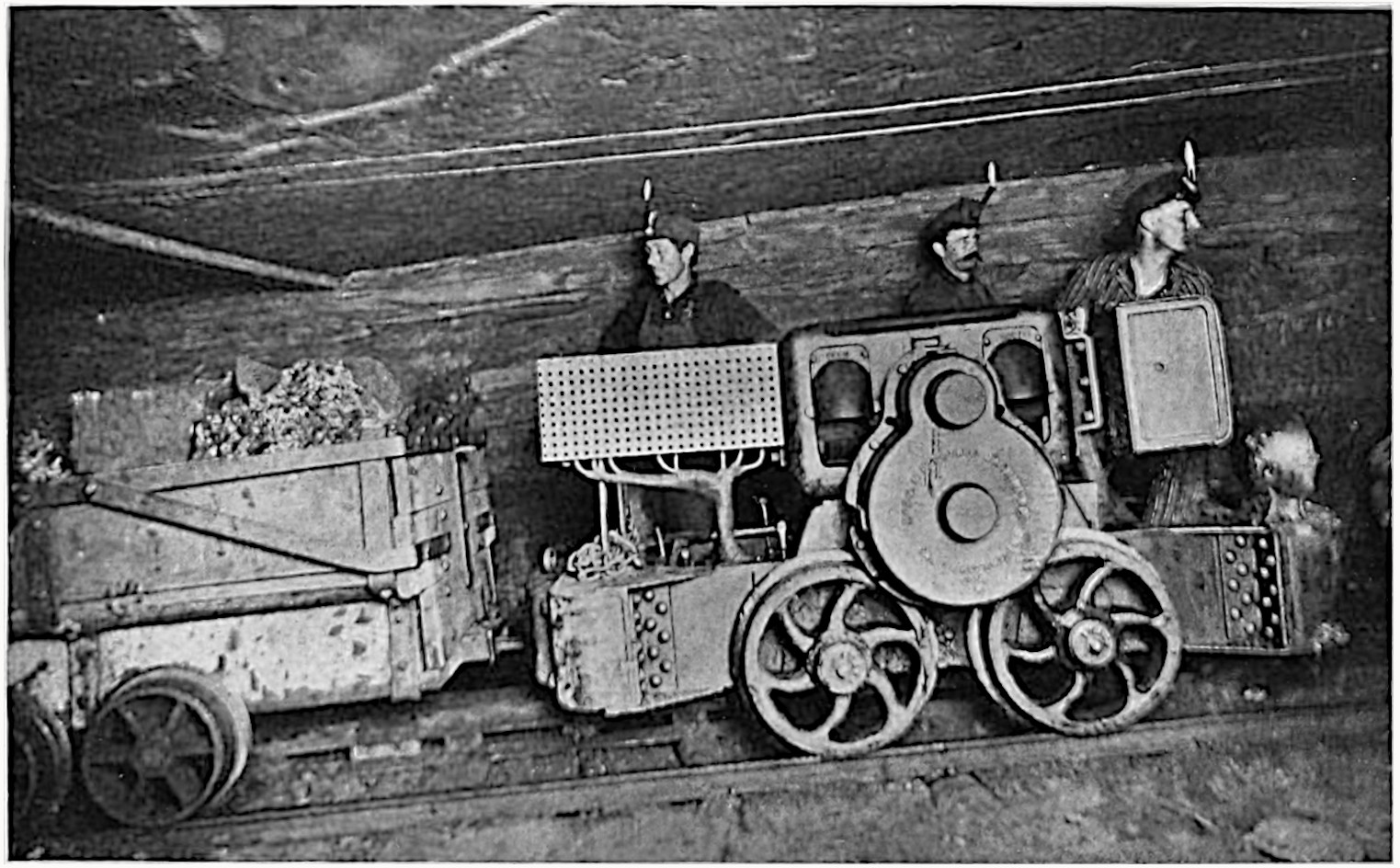
Miners working underground.

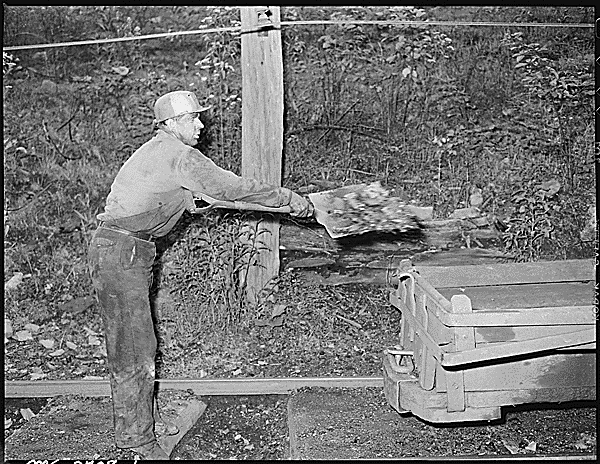
Eli Sanders, tipple worker, loads coal on car which has fallen off cars en route to tipple.

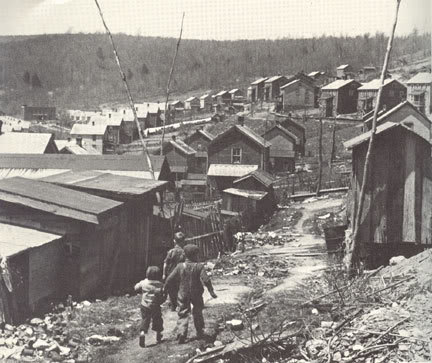
Children walking their way through the town of Evarts

The Battle of Evarts (May 5, 1931) was a 30-minute firefight between anti-union gunmen and striking coal miners on a rural highway near Evarts, Harlan County, Kentucky. Four people died in the shooting. The battle became the signature event of a violent decade that has been called the Harlan County Wars.

== The battle ==
Accounts differ, but there is consensus on some details. Peabody Coal Company owned and operated the Black Mountain mine at Kenvir in Harlan County. After some Black Mountain miners attended a March 1 pro-union rally in neighboring Bell County, armed guards working for Peabody evicted more than 175 families from company-owned housing at Black Mountain. On March 17, local UMW members called a wildcat strike at the Black Mountain mine. Evarts, one of few Harlan County towns not then owned by mining companies, quickly became the temporary residence for evicted and striking miners. In the following weeks, as more miners joined the strike, the numbers in Harlan County mass marches and rallies reached 4000, and isolated violent acts included the dynamiting of one mine entrance. A mid-April Knoxville News-Sentinel headline warned, “Flare Up in Harlan Expected."

Early on the morning of May 5, striking miners in Evarts spotted a Peabody truck passing through town. One account of May 5 says the truck was heading to Verda to pick up a new foreman and bring him to the Peabody camp at Kenvir. A different account agrees that Verda was the destination but says the truck was sent to retrieve personal belongings for a recently hired non-union miner. A third account says the truck was headed to Harlan to pick up a load of non-union replacement workers for transport to the Peabody camp. Whatever the reason, the truck's passing excited strikers who began to congregate at the Evarts railway station. Alerted by telephone to the strikers' unrest, Peabody managers dispatched from Kenvir a three-car caravan of armed guards for the purpose of meeting the truck at its pickup destination and escorting the truck and its contents on the return drive through Evarts to Kenvir.

Accounts agree that just beyond Evarts, the dispatched caravan encountered armed strikers. Two accounts agree that one shot rang out, and then guns from both sides blazed away. What's not agreed is whether the miners had set a deliberate ambush or whether they were attempting with a picket line to block the Peabody cars. Jim Garland, then a coal miner in Harlan and Bell Counties, recalled in a later interview that the company gunmen drove "through Evarts and met the picket line. They jumped on one of the Negro pickets and started to beat him when all hell broke loose. Both sides began firing." History professor and author John W. Hevener, citing testimony from a 1932 U.S. Senate hearing, characterized the firefight as "the Evarts ambush."

== Aftermath ==
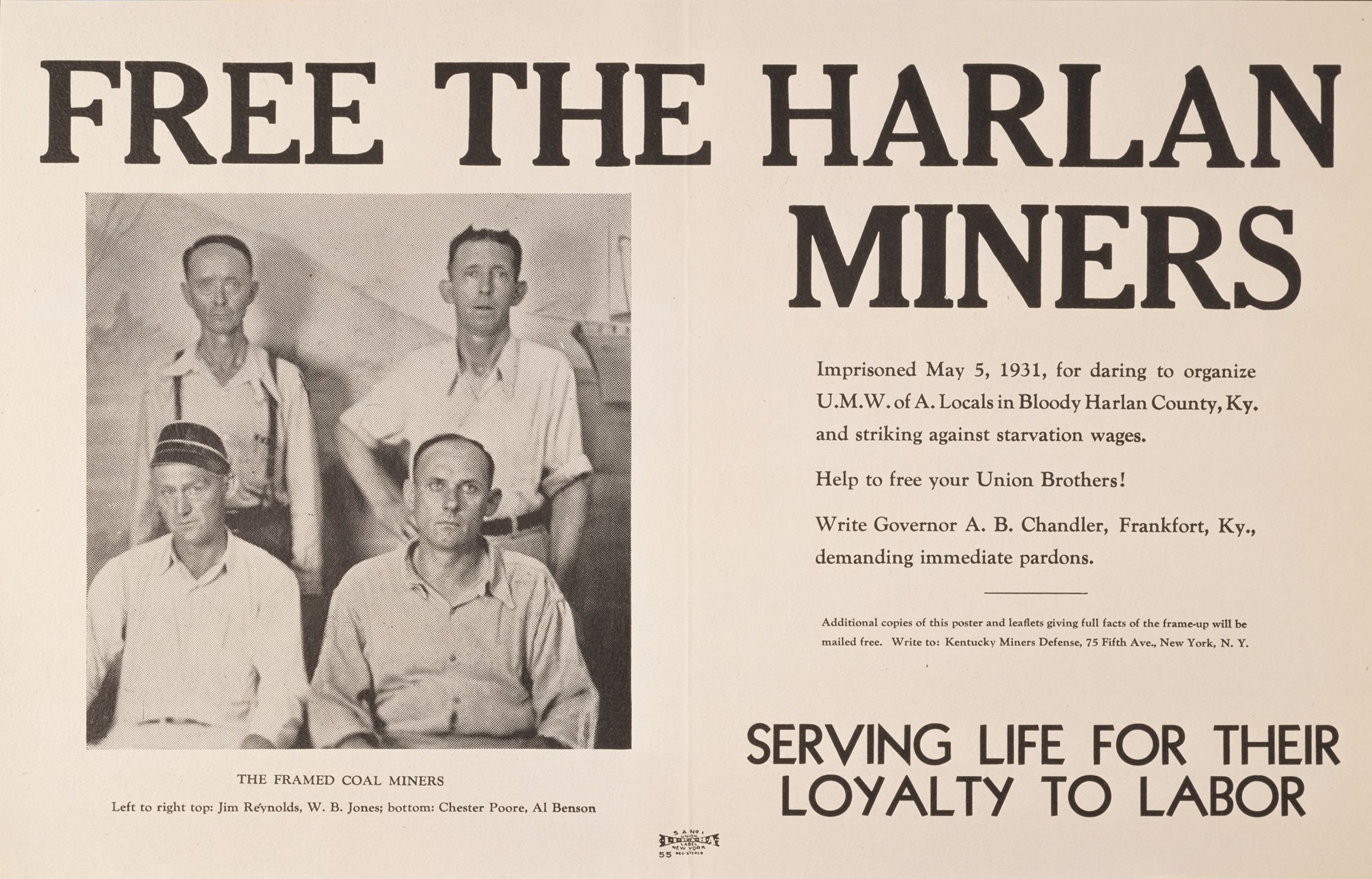
"FREE THE HARLAN MINERS," a poster issued by the Kentucky Miners' Defense on behalf of those arrested following the battle, 1931

Immediately after the battle, thousands more Harlan County miners walked off their jobs to join the strike. But mine owners held firm, and the national UMW distanced itself from the strikers. May 7, Kentucky Governor Flem D. Sampson sent 300 National Guardsmen to Evarts. The Guardsmen disarmed the striking miners, and violence subsided. Four days after the battle, strike leaders were arrested and charged with crimes. Eight miners received life sentences for conspiracy to murder for the actions that took place on May 5. Less than a month after the battle, most strikers had returned to their work in the mines.
