= Black Bottom, Kentucky =

Unincorporated community in Kentucky, United States

- Unincorporated community
- Location within Kentucky
- Coordinates: 36°54′32″N 83°04′49″W
- Country: United States
- State: Kentucky
- County: Harlan
- Elevation: 1,509 ft (460 m)
- Time zone: UTC-5 (Eastern (EST))
  - Summer (DST): UTC-4 (EDT)
- Area code: 606
- GNIS feature ID: 510745

Black Bottom is an unincorporated community in Harlan County, Kentucky, United States. Black Bottom is located along Kentucky Route 38 7.2 miles (11.6 km) east-northeast of Evarts.
