= Beechmont, Kentucky =

Beechmont, Kentucky may refer to:

- Beechmont, Louisville, a neighborhood in Kentucky
- Beechmont, Muhlenberg County, Kentucky, a census-designated place and unincorporated community
