= WBFW =

WBFW may refer to:

- WBFW (FM), a radio station (94.5 FM) licensed to serve Smith Mills, Kentucky, United States
- WPTA-DT2, a television subchannel (channel 24.2, virtual 21.2) in Fort Wayne, Indiana, United States, which was known as WBFW from 1998 to 2006
