= Holmes Mill =

Holmes Mill may refer to:

- Holmes Mill, Kentucky
- Homes Mills, New Jersey, also known as Holmes Mills
