= Kentenia =

Kentenia may refer to:

- Kentenia, Kentucky, a community in Harlan County, Kentucky
- Kentenia State Forest, a state forest in Harlan County, Kentucky
