= Hopkins County Courthouse =

Hopkins County Courthouse may refer to:

- Hopkins County Courthouse (Kentucky), a contributing building in Madisonville Commercial Historic District
- Hopkins County Courthouse (Texas)
