= Kentucky Route 136 =

State highway in Kentucky, United States

Kentucky Route 136
- KY 136 highlighted in red

Route information
- Maintained by KYTC
- Length: 66.540 mi (107.086 km)

Northwestern segment
- Length: 34.198 mi (55.036 km)
- West end: Ohio River dead end in northwestern Henderson County
- Major intersections: US 41 Alt. / US 60 in Henderson; US 41 / KY 425 in Henderson; KY 416 in Niagara
- East end: Green River dead end in southern Henderson County

Southeastern segment
- Length: 32.342 mi (52.049 km)
- West end: KY 56 in Beech Grove
- Major intersections: US 431 in Livermore
- East end: US 231 near Hartford

Location
- Country: United States
- State: Kentucky
- Counties: Henderson, McLean, Ohio

Highway system
- Kentucky State Highway System; Interstate; US; State; Parkways
← KY 135	→ KY 137

Kentucky Route 136 (KY 136) is a 32.342-mile-long (52.049 km) state highway in northwestern Kentucky. It has two disconnected sections, one that goes from the Ohio River near Sloughs Wildlife Management Area to the Green River near Rangers Landing via Henderson, and the other that runs from KY 56 in Beech Grove west of Sebree to U.S. Route 231 (US 231) north of Hartford via Calhoun and Livermore.

== Route description ==
=== Northwestern segment ===
KY 136 begins in northwestern Henderson County near a landing of the Ohio River opposite Mount Vernon, Indiana. Heading southeast, it turns to the east at Smith Hills. After going through Geneva, it begins a brief concurrency with US 60 to head into the city of Henderson. It then turns onto the old alignment of US 41 heading south to begin a brief concurrency with the mainline US 41 south of Henderson. It leaves US 41 at Anthoston. KY 136 traverses the Niagara community at its Kentucky Route 416 junction before ending its first section at Rangers Landing.

=== Southeastern segment ===
At Beech Grove, KY 136 has a junction with KY 56. KY 136 heads southeast to the cities of Calhoun and Livermore before entering Ohio County. Its eastern terminus is at US 231 just north of Hartford.

== History ==
The two sections of KY 136 connected via a tolled ferry crossing of the Green River at Rangers Landing, and ran concurrency with KY 56 from Corner to Beech Grove. Although ferry service was discontinued by 1968, road maps still mark KY 136 as running from Rangers Landing to Beech Grove.

KY 136 also connected to Mount Vernon, Indiana, via a tolled ferry on the Ohio River, which was decommissioned by the beginning of the 1950s

== Major intersections ==
County	Location	mi	km	Destinations	Notes
McLean	Beech Grove	0.000	0.000	KY 56 (Main Street)	Western terminus
McLean	Beech Grove	0.267	0.430	KY 796 east (Kidd Lane)	Western terminus of KY 796
McLean		2.328	3.747	KY 797 south	Northern terminus of KY 797
McLean		2.912	4.686	KY 593 west / Porter School Road	Eastern terminus of KY 593
McLean		4.109	6.613	KY 140 west (Pascal-King Road)	West end of KY 140 overlap
McLean		4.336	6.978	KY 140 east	East end of KY 140 overlap
McLean		8.023	12.912	KY 1792 west	Eastern terminus of KY 1792
McLean	Calhoun	9.819	15.802	KY 81 (Main Street)	
McLean		11.753	18.915	KY 250 east	Western terminus of KY 250
McLean		13.112	21.102	KY 1046	
McLean		14.932	24.031	KY 798 north	Southern terminus of KY 798
McLean	Livermore	19.334	31.115	US 431 south (Henton Street)	West end of US 431 overlap
McLean	Livermore	19.458	31.315	US 431 north (Hinton Street)	East end of US 431 overlap
Ohio		32.342	52.049	US 231	Eastern terminus
1.000 mi = 1.609 km; 1.000 km = 0.621 mi: Concurrency terminus
