= Coxton =

Coxton may refer to:

== Places ==
=== United Kingdom ===
- Coxton Tower, Scotland

=== United States ===
- Coxton, Indiana, a community in Lawrence County, Indiana
- Coxton, Kentucky, a community in Harlan County, Kentucky
