= Red Bud =

Red Bud or Redbud may refer to:

== Places ==
- Red Bud, Georgia, community in USA
- Red Bud, Illinois, city in USA
- Redbud, Kentucky

== Plants ==
- Cercis or Redbud tree
  - Cercis canadensis, Eastern redbud
  - Cercis occidentalis, Western redbud

== Other uses ==
- Redbud Woods controversy, dispute at Cornell University, USA
- USCGC Redbud (WLB-398), US Coast Guard ship
- Red Bud MX a motocross track in Buchanan, Michigan, USA
