= Holmes Mills =

Holmes Mills may refer to:

- Holmes Mill, Kentucky
- Homes Mills, New Jersey, also known as Holmes Mills
