= WBGW-FM =

- Fort Branch, Indiana; United States
- Broadcast area: Evansville, Indiana
- Frequency: 101.5 MHz
- Branding: Thy Word Network

Programming
- Format: Christian Radio

Ownership
- Owner: Music Ministries Inc.
- Sister stations: WBHW; WBJW

History
- Former call signs: WBGW (1989–2016)

Technical information
- Licensing authority: FCC
- Facility ID: 47099
- Class: A
- ERP: 2,100 watts
- HAAT: 171 meters (561 ft)
- Transmitter coordinates: 38°10′45″N 87°29′13″W

Links
- Public license information: Public file; LMS
- Webcast: Listen live
- Website: thyword.media

WBGW-FM is a Christian radio station licensed to Fort Branch, Indiana, broadcasting on 101.5 FM. The station serves the Evansville Metropolitan Area. WBGW-FM is owned by Music Ministries Inc., and is an affiliate of Thy Word Network.

The WBGW tower facilities, located in Gibson County, Indiana, are also licensed for use by NOAA's National Weather Service All Hazards Radio network, KIG76, from Paducah, Kentucky.

== Simulcasts ==
The station is simulcast on 88.7 WBHW in Loogootee, Indiana, 91.7 WBJW in Albion, Illinois, and 94.5 WBFW in Smith Mills, Kentucky. Thy Word Network is also heard in Owensboro, Kentucky through a translator on 106.5 FM and Tell City, Indiana through a translator on 93.7 FM.

Call sign	Frequency	City of license	FID	ERP (W)	HAAT	Class	FCC info
WBHW	88.7 FM	Loogootee, Indiana	47098	5,300	145.9 m (479 ft)	B1	LMS
WBJW	91.7 FM	Albion, Illinois	76428	1,700	152 m (499 ft)	A	LMS
WBFW	94.5 FM	Smith Mills, Kentucky	184596	5,400	88.6 m (291 ft)	A	LMS
W229BX	93.7 FM	Tell City, Indiana	141319	80	33.1 m (109 ft)	D	LMS
W293AT	106.5 FM	Owensboro, Kentucky	138529	38	67.4 m (221 ft)	D	LMS
