= John Miller Cooper =

American basketball player (1912–2010)

John Miller Cooper (1912 – September 18, 2010) was an American educator. He is also regarded as one of the early innovators of the basketball jump shot and as a pioneer in the field of biomechanics and human movement.

== Biography ==
=== Early years ===
Cooper was born in Smith Mills, Kentucky in 1912. He was the oldest of six children born to Clay Calhoun Cooper, a cattleman, and Martha Barrett Randolph, a homemaker and boarding house operator.

He attended Corydon High School (now closed) in Henderson County, Kentucky, transferring to Hopkinsville High School in Hopkinsville, Kentucky, in his senior year.

Cooper received his Bachelor's in physics from the University of Missouri (MU). He later received his Masters' and Doctorate degrees in Education from that same institution.

Cooper's doctoral studies were interrupted in 1940, when he joined the U.S. Army Air Forces. Cooper served 40 months in the military, achieving the rank of captain, before being honorably discharged so that he might resume his studies.

=== Jump shot innovator ===
Cooper earned varsity letters in three separate sports at MU, including basketball. He is recognized by some basketball scholars as an early innovators of the jump shot, being perhaps the first college basketball player to use the technique as his primary offensive weapon.

According to journalist Bill Pennington, writing in The New York Times in 2011, the origins of the "jumper" are a matter of significant scholarly dispute:

Basketball historians have narrowed the jump shot incubation period to the early 1930s. And they have focused on a handful of athletes, with Cooper, a college teenager eager to be airborne in a flat-footed, set-shot-taking world, at center stage.

According to Cooper himself, he learned the revolutionary shooting technique by watching a player from the University of Chicago team practicing at his high school's gym.

"The ball came off the board; he jumped and shot it back in, in mid-air," Cooper later recalled, noting that in the early days of the game shots were taken from a stationary position on the floor and that players catching the ball in mid-air would only throw the ball at the basket if they had no place to pass it.

Inspired by what he had seen, Cooper intentionally practiced jumping and shooting the ball in mid-air during his high school career and brought the shot with him to MU. At MU, he was named All-Conference in the former Big Six Conference in 1932.

Cooper's coach, George Edwards, was secretary of the College Basketball Coaches Association at the time and during one of their meetings, he asked his colleagues whether they had ever seen a player make regular use of the jump shot technique in game action. The coaches said they had not, lending credence to the assertion that Cooper was the first collegiate player to make use of the offensive innovation.

The Basketball Hall of Fame, in Springfield, Massachusetts, has thus far rejected Cooper's claim to fame as originator of the jumper at the collegiate level, instead recognizing Kenny Sailors as the father of the technique.

"Sailors was after my time," Cooper later remembered. "He took the jump shot into the pros."

=== Kinesiologist ===
In 1945, Cooper moved to California, where he taught kinesiology at the University of Southern California (USC) until 1966. While there, Cooper co-authored textbooks in kinesiology with his colleagues on the USC staff.

In 1966, Cooper decided to return to his midwestern roots, accepting a position at Indiana University (IU). Cooper remained at IU until his retirement in 1982.

Known internationally as the father of modern biomechanics and human movement, Cooper was the recipient of numerous prestigious honors. Noted for his unique and pioneering work in the field of kinesiology, the National Academy of Kinesiology sponsored a national lectureship in his name. In 1994, Cooper was awarded the Hetherington Award by the National Academy, and in 1995, he was the recipient of the Luther Gulich Award, the highest honor given in the field of Kinesiology.

In 1991, he was inducted into the MU's Intercollegiate Athletics Hall of Fame.

=== Death and legacy ===
Cooper died on September 18, 2010, in Studio City, California, at the age of 98. He was preceded in death by his wife of 65 years, Charlianna.

Cooper was eulogized by David M. Koceja, chair of IU's Department of Kinesiology:

[Cooper] was one of the most widely known researchers, authors, and educators in the history of kinesiology. His research and teaching at Indiana University brought international recognition to the reputation of our graduate programs in general, and biomechanics in particular. Dr. Cooper served as model for all that is good about the university — he was universally well-liked and served as a mentor to many students and faculty alike.

Cooper is the great-uncle of American swimmer Whitney Myers.
