= Wayt =

Wayt is a surname. Notable people with the surname include:

- Gregory L. Wayt (born 1953), American official, Adjutant General of Ohio
- Russell Wayt (1942–2020), American football linebacker

== See also ==
- WayFM Network
