= Prentiss, Kentucky =

Unincorporated community in Kentucky, United States

Prentiss
- Unincorporated community
- Location within the state of Kentucky Prentiss (the United States)
- Coordinates: 37°20′5″N 86°50′26″W
- Country: United States
- State: Kentucky
- County: Ohio
- Elevation: 427 ft (130 m)
- Time zone: UTC-6 (Central (CST))
  - Summer (DST): UTC-5 (CDT)
- GNIS feature ID: 508872

Prentiss is an unincorporated community and coal town located in Ohio County, Kentucky, United States. It was also known as Gasburg.
