= Benito, Kentucky =

Unincorporated community in Kentucky, United States

- Unincorporated community
- Location within Kentucky Location within the United States
- Coordinates: 36°54′00″N 83°7′42″W
- Country: United States
- State: Kentucky
- County: Harlan
- Elevation: 1,401 ft (427 m)
- Time zone: UTC-6 (Central (CST))
  - Summer (DST): UTC-5 (CST)
- GNIS feature ID: 510554

Benito is an unincorporated community and coal camp in Harlan County, Kentucky, United States. Benito is located on the Clover Fork, near the city of Evarts, Kentucky. The small community is located between the communities of Gano and Highsplint.

== History ==
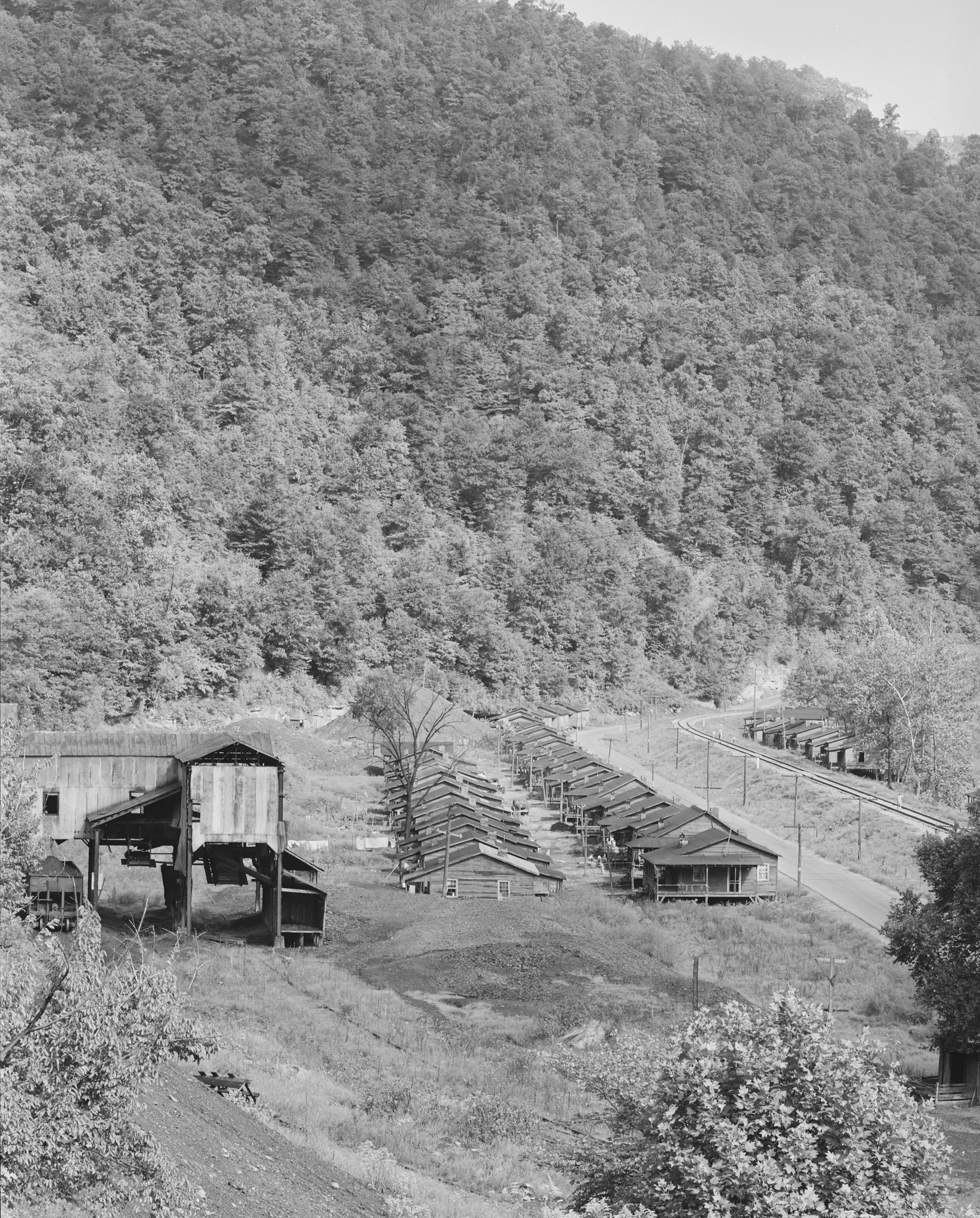
Company houses for miners employed by the Benito Mining Company, 1946

Benito was founded by the Benito Mining Company. Its post office was established in 1929, and served the nearby community of Gano as well as Benito, with James Bennett as its postmaster. Its post office closed in 1940. The Louisville and Nashville Railroad operated a line through the community. At its peak, the communities of Gano and Benito had a combined population of 300.
