= Beech Grove, McLean County, Kentucky =

Unincorporated community in Kentucky, United States

Beech Grove, Kentucky
- Census-designated place
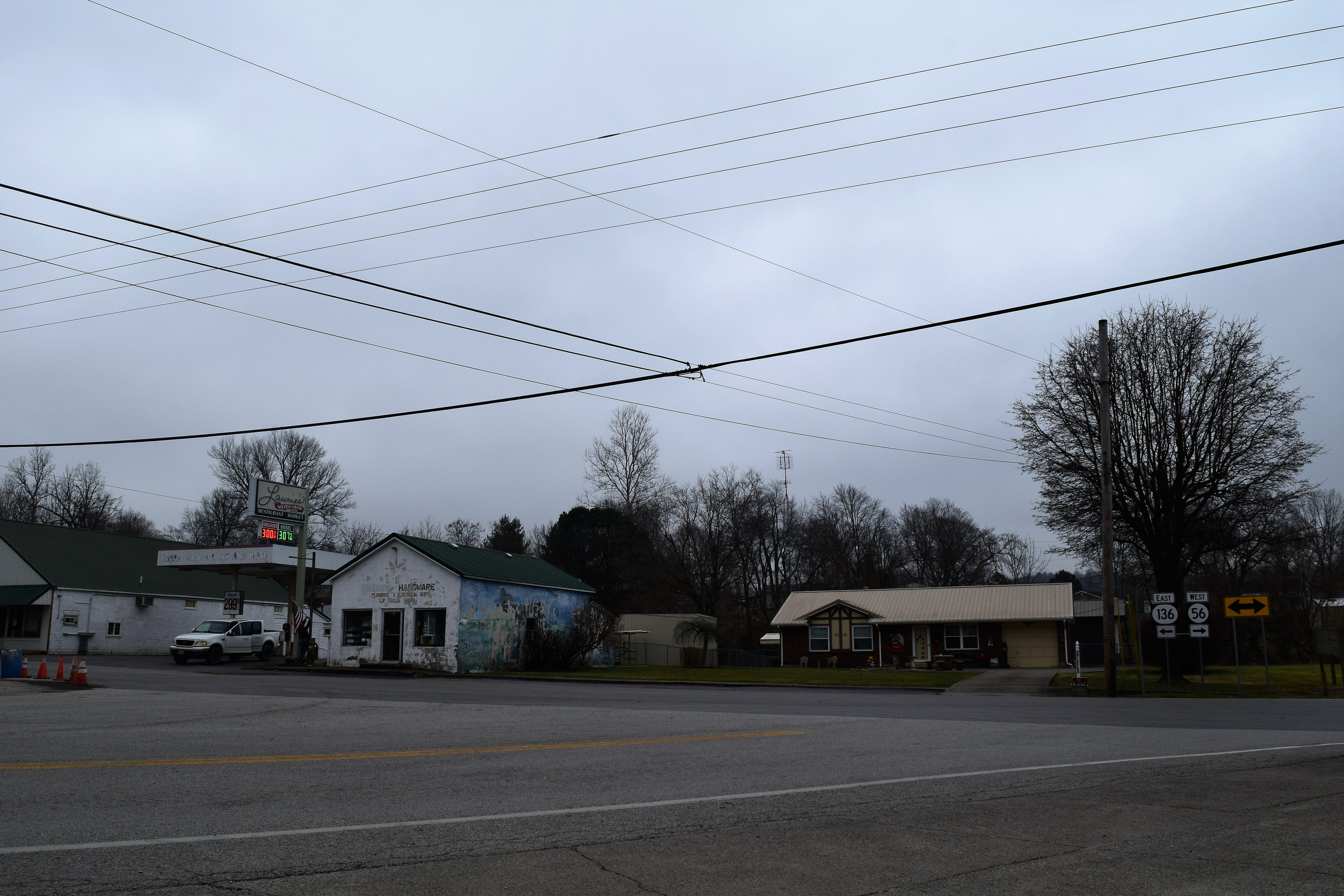
- Intersection of KY 56 and KY 136 in Beech Grove

- Location within Kentucky Location within the United States
- Coordinates: 37°36′58″N 87°23′47″W
- Country: United States
- State: Kentucky
- County: McLean

Area
  - Total: 1.86 sq mi (4.81 km^{2})
  - Land: 1.85 sq mi (4.78 km^{2})
  - Water: 0.012 sq mi (0.03 km^{2})
- Elevation: 410 ft (120 m)

Population (2020)
  - Total: 282
  - Density: 152.9/sq mi (59.02/km^{2})
- Time zone: UTC-6 (Central (CST))
  - Summer (DST): UTC-5 (CDT)
- ZIP code: 42322
- Area codes: 270 & 364
- FIPS code: 21-04978
- GNIS feature ID: 486710

Beech Grove is an unincorporated community and census-designated place in McLean County, Kentucky, United States. Its population was 282 as of the 2020 census. Beech Grove has a post office with ZIP code 42322, which opened on April 29, 1878.

== Geography ==
Beech Grove is in northwestern McLean County.

According to the U.S. Census Bureau, the Beech Grove CDP has an area of 1.858 square miles (4.81 km^{2}); 1.845 square miles (4.78 km^{2}) of its area is land, and 0.013 square miles (0.034 km^{2}) is water.

== Transportation ==
Kentucky Routes 56, 136, and 256 pass through the community. KY 136 leads southeast 10 miles (16 km) to Calhoun, the county seat, and west 8 miles (13 km) to Sebree. KY 56 leads west to Sebree with KY 136 but turns northeast in Beech Grove to lead 22 miles (35 km) to Owensboro. KY 256 leads southeast to Calhoun by a more southerly route.

== Demographics ==
Historical population
Census	Pop.	Note	%±
2010	243		—
2020	282		16.0%
U.S. Decennial Census
