= WBFZ =

- Selma, Alabama; United States
- Frequency: 105.3 MHz
- Branding: Z105.3

Programming
- Format: Urban Contemporary, Gospel

Ownership
- Owner: Imani Communications Corporation, Inc.

History
- First air date: August 14, 2001

Technical information
- Licensing authority: FCC
- Facility ID: 81739
- Class: C2
- ERP: 50,000 watts
- HAAT: 150 meters
- Transmitter coordinates: 32°16′18″N 87°15′28″W

Links
- Public license information: Public file; LMS
- Website: wbfzfm.com

WBFZ (105.3 FM) is a radio station licensed to serve Selma, Alabama, United States. The station is owned by Imani Communications Corporation, Inc. It airs an urban contemporary/gospel format.

== History ==
This station received its original construction permit from the Federal Communications Commission on June 17, 1998. The new station was assigned the call letters WBFZ by the FCC on August 10, 1998. The station went on the air on August 14, 2001, but went off the air due to bad weather conditions. It was later reopened on September 10. WBFZ received its license to cover from the FCC on August 16, 2001.

The station has expanded its reach to over 100,000 listeners throughout the Black Belt daily.
