= Black Mountain Off-Road Adventure Area =

Area in Harlan County, Kentucky

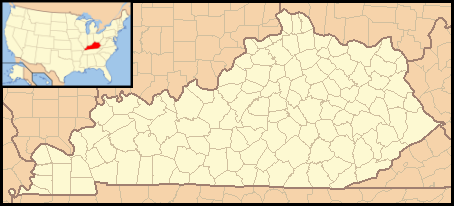
- Location of Black Mountain Off-Road Adventure Area
- Location: Harlan, Kentucky, United States
- Coordinates: 36°52′58″N 83°11′19″W
- Area: 7,000 acres (28 km^{2})
- Established: 2005
- Operator: Harlan County Outdoor Recreation Board Authority (HCORBA)

Black Mountain Off-Road Adventure Area is a 7,000-acre off-road trail system in Harlan County, Kentucky. The trail system is open to All-Terrain Vehicles and all types of Off-Highway Vehicles. The trail system is managed by the Harlan County Outdoor Recreation Board Authority (HCORBA), a 501c4 non-profit board created by the Harlan County Fiscal Court. The trail system receives an estimated 20,000 to 30,000 visitors each year from the eastern United States and Canada.

== Trails ==
The trail system includes approximately 150 miles of trail, most of which are the by-product of contour mining and logging. Trails are identified with a unique number or name and given a classification that describes the trail's difficulty and exposure. Numbers and classifications are posted on signs at intersections as well as on trail maps that can be viewed on several kiosks on the property or purchased at a trailhead.

Due to the geography of Black Mountain, trails vary in elevation and often include hill climbs and descents. Elevation ranges from 1,180 ft to 3,321 ft above sea level.

== Trailheads ==
The trail system is accessible from two trailheads, Evarts Trailhead on the south near the City of Evarts, and Putney Trailhead on the north near the community of Putney. Evarts Trailhead is operated by HCORBA. Putney Trailhead is operated privately by Harlan County Campground & RV Park LLC.

== Permit system ==
In 2009, the HCORBA implemented a general use permit system requiring all visitors to register their vehicle at a trailhead and purchase a vehicle permit. Permits are sold for terms of 31-days or one year. Fees generated through the permit system allow HCORBA to operate and maintain the trail system.

== Publicity ==
Black Mountain Off-Road Adventure Area has been featured on numerous television shows including the Outdoor Channel's Ride To Adventure Extreme and Fisher's ATV World and Spike TV's Trucks! The trail system has been featured in off-road and powersports magazines including ATV Rider, ATV Illustrated and ATV Sport. ATV Illustrated called Black Mountain Off-Road Adventure Area "possibly the best ATV riding in North America."

== Name changes ==
The trail system was originally named Black Mountain Recreation Park. In 2008, it was renamed to Black Mountain Off-Road Adventure Park and then subsequently Black Mountain Off-Road Adventure Area. Evarts Trailhead, one of the trail systems two trailheads, was originally named Bailey Creek Trailhead.
