= Blackjoe, Kentucky =

Unincorporated community in Kentucky, United States

- Unincorporated community
- Location within Kentucky Location within the United States
- Coordinates: 36°51′42″N 83°16′55″W
- Country: United States
- State: Kentucky
- County: Harlan
- Elevation: 1,444 ft (440 m)
- Time zone: UTC-5 (Eastern (EST))
  - Summer (DST): UTC-4 (EDT)
- Area code: 606
- GNIS feature ID: 487413

Blackjoe is an unincorporated community and coal town in Harlan County, Kentucky, United States. Their Post Office closed in 1935.
