= Ebenezer, Kentucky =

Unincorporated community in Kentucky, United States

- Unincorporated community
- Location within Kentucky Location within the United States
- Coordinates: 37°12′14″N 87°4′51″W
- Country: United States
- State: Kentucky
- County: Muhlenberg
- Elevation: 522 ft (159 m)
- Time zone: UTC-6 (Central (CST))
  - Summer (DST): UTC-5 (CST)
- GNIS feature ID: 491532

Ebenezer is an unincorporated community located in Muhlenberg County, Kentucky, United States.

The name Ebenezer is biblical in origin.
