= Henshaw, Kentucky =

Henshaw is an unincorporated community in Union County, Kentucky, United States.

Location of Henshaw on a map.

A post office named Henshaw operated from 1887 to 1960.

== Location ==
Henshaw is located in the western part of Union County in the western part of Kentucky.

=== Nearby cities ===
- Morganfield (northeast)
- Old Shawneetown (northwest)
- Shawneetown (northwest)
- Sturgis (southeast)
- Uniontown (northeast)

== Name ==
Henshaw is named after George Henshaw, who was one of the first settlers in Union County, and was one of the largest land owners in the area.
