= Saint John, Kentucky =

Unincorporated community in Kentucky, United States

- Unincorporated community
- Location within Kentucky Location within the United States
- Coordinates: 37°41′54″N 85°57′59″W
- Country: United States
- State: Kentucky
- County: Hardin
- Elevation: 755 ft (230 m)
- Time zone: UTC-5 (Eastern (EST))
  - Summer (DST): UTC-4 (EDT)
- Area codes: 270 & 364
- GNIS feature ID: 508997

Saint John is an unincorporated community in Hardin County, Kentucky, United States. Saint John is located on Kentucky Route 1357, 5.6 miles (9.0 km) west of Elizabethtown.

The community took its name from the nearby St. John the Baptist Catholic church.
