= Howardstown, Kentucky =

Unincorporated community in Kentucky, United States

Coordinates: 37°34′20″N 85°35′31″W

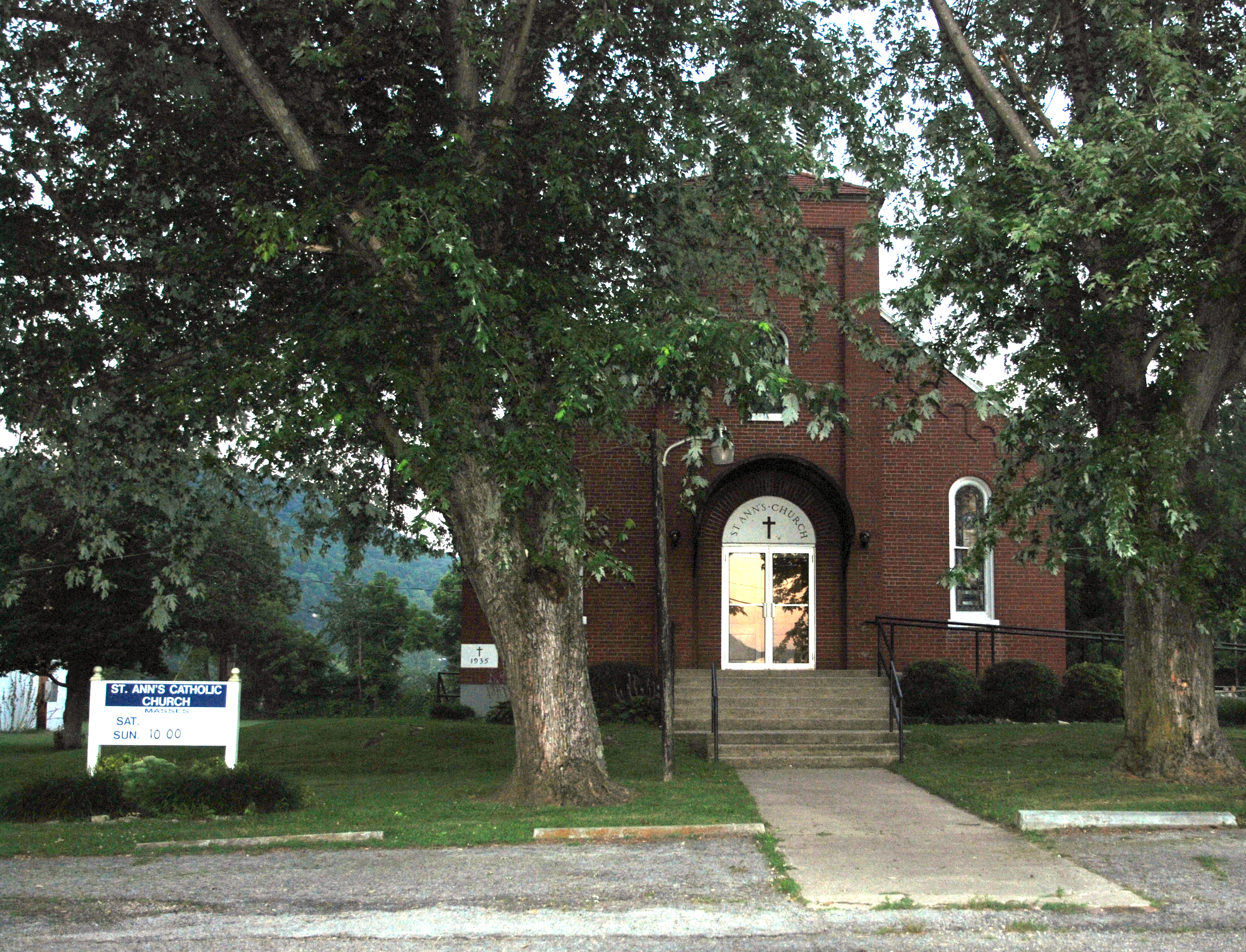
St. Ann's Catholic Church in Howardstown

Howardstown, Kentucky is an unincorporated community located on the Rolling Fork River in the southern portion of Nelson County, Kentucky, United States.

A post office was established in Howardstown in 1893, and named for the local Howard family. A member of that family, William Howard, had first settled the area c. 1811.
