= Hutch, Kentucky =

Unincorporated community in Kentucky, United States

Hutch
- Unincorporated community
- Location within the state of Kentucky Hutch (the United States)
- Coordinates: 36°39′2″N 83°37′17″W
- Country: United States
- State: Kentucky
- County: Bell
- Elevation: 1,214 ft (370 m)
- Time zone: UTC-5 (Eastern (EST))
  - Summer (DST): UTC-4 (EDT)
- GNIS feature ID: 494856

Hutch is an unincorporated community located in Bell County, Kentucky, United States.
