= Cubage, Kentucky =

Unincorporated community in Kentucky, United States

Cubage
- Unincorporated community
- Location within the state of Kentucky Cubage (the United States)
- Coordinates: 36°42′4″N 83°31′16″W
- Country: United States
- State: Kentucky
- County: Bell
- Elevation: 1,178 ft (359 m)
- Time zone: UTC-5 (Eastern (EST))
  - Summer (DST): UTC-4 (EDT)
- ZIP codes: 40822
- GNIS feature ID: 490455

Cubage is an unincorporated community located in Bell County, Kentucky, United States. The approximate elevation of Cubage is 1,178 feet (359 meters). Their post office closed in 1989.

According to tradition, someone carved "cub bear killed here" onto a beech tree. Cub Beech, as it was then known, was corrupted into Cubage. A post office was established in 1879.
