= Confluence, Kentucky =

Unincorporated community in Kentucky, United States

- Unincorporated community
- Location in Kentucky Location in the United States
- Coordinates: 37°16′11″N 83°23′3″W
- Country: United States
- State: Kentucky
- County: Leslie
- Elevation: 892 ft (272 m)
- Time zone: UTC-5 (Eastern (EST))
  - Summer (DST): UTC-4 (EDT)
- ZIP codes: 41749
- GNIS feature ID: 511495

Confluence is an unincorporated community located in Leslie County, Kentucky, United States. Its post office is closed.

Due to the Buckhorn dam, the area is prone to flooding. Efforts to address the flooding issue have thus far been in vain as local politicians focus their time and money on other areas.
