= Peytons Store, Kentucky =

Peytons Store
- Unincorporated community
- Location within the state of Kentucky Peytons Store (the United States)
- Coordinates: 37°27′46″N 84°58′16″W
- Country: United States
- State: Kentucky
- County: Casey
- Elevation: 860 ft (260 m)
- Time zone: UTC-6 (Central (CST))
  - Summer (DST): UTC-5 (CST)
- GNIS feature ID: 500509

Peytons Store is an unincorporated community in Casey County, Kentucky, United States. It was also known as Alstotts Store.
