= Rockcastle, Kentucky =

Unincorporated community in Kentucky, United States

Rockcastle
- Unincorporated community
- Location within the state of Kentucky Rockcastle (the United States)
- Coordinates: 36°53′59″N 87°59′14″W
- Country: United States
- State: Kentucky
- County: Trigg
- Elevation: 394 ft (120 m)
- Time zone: UTC-6 (Central (CST))
  - Summer (DST): UTC-5 (CST)
- GNIS feature ID: 508957

Rockcastle, formerly Rock Castle, is an unincorporated community in Trigg County, Kentucky, United States.

== History ==
A post office was in operation at Rockcastle from 1839 until 1915. The community derives its name from a nearby rock formation called Castle Rock. for strategic reasons rockcastle was burned during the war. Old Rockcastle now lies under lake barkley
