= Otia, Kentucky =

Unincorporated community in Kentucky, United States

- Unincorporated community
- Location within Kentucky Location within the United States
- Coordinates: 36°41′16″N 85°34′09″W
- Country: United States
- State: Kentucky
- County: Monroe
- Elevation: 568 ft (173 m)
- Time zone: UTC−6 (CST)
  - Summer (DST): UTC−5 (CDT)
- ZIP codes: 42167
- GNIS feature ID: 508762

Otia is a rural unincorporated community in Monroe County, Kentucky, United States. The community is located near the confluence of Sulphur Creek and the Cumberland River.
