= Number One, Kentucky =

Unincorporated community in Kentucky, United States

Number One
- Unincorporated community
- Location within the state of Kentucky Number One (the United States)
- Coordinates: 36°48′39″N 84°52′6″W
- Country: United States
- State: Kentucky
- County: Wayne
- Elevation: 938 ft (286 m)
- Time zone: UTC-5 (Eastern (EST))
  - Summer (DST): UTC-4 (EDT)
- GNIS feature ID: 499634

Number One is an unincorporated community located in Wayne County, Kentucky, United States.
