= Rolling Fork (Kentucky) =

River in United States of America

Coordinates: 37.91868°N 85.83024°W

The Rolling Fork is a 108-mile-long (174 km) river in central Kentucky. The river flows through Marion and Hardin counties, as well as being the border between LaRue and Nelson counties. The Rolling Fork drains much of the land in these counties, and is a key part of life in this area of the Knob Region. The Rolling Fork is a part of the Salt River Basin, and the larger Ohio River Basin.

== Geography ==
The Rolling Fork begins in southern Boyle County. It winds through the county, gradually increasing in size. After passing through Marion County, the Rolling Fork moves to be the border of LaRue County and Nelson County, starting near the High View area. The river snakes along Nelson and LaRue Counties, making a u-shaped bend along the Knobs. The rivers goes on and gains size when the Beech Fork joins it near Youngers Creek, a community in Hardin County that borders Nelson County. Eventually, the Rolling Fork joins the Salt River at the Hardin County - Bullitt County line. The Salt River empties into the Ohio River about 9 miles (14 km) later, at West Point, Kentucky. The Rolling Fork has a mean annual discharge of 1,828 cubic feet per second at Boston, per data collected during the period 1939–2015.

The Rolling Fork winds through the Knobs of the region. These knobs shape the river and add to it the various "hallows" and bends that characterize the terrain. The river lies in beautiful valleys, and sets alongside many rich river bottoms. These bottoms provide excellent growing opportunities for grain farms, and surrounding pasture for cattle. The river valley is somewhat prone to flooding. Major flooding occurred most recently on the week after May 1, 2010. This flooding deeply impacted the communities, spilling water in New Haven, Howardstown and elsewhere. The raging waters scoured river bottoms and deposited brush and gravel there. In New Haven, the flood waters damaged the Kentucky Railway Museum.

== Wildlife ==
The wildlife of Rolling Fork and its valleys include white-tailed deer, squirrels, opossums, beavers, skunk, and rabbits. Birds such as the great blue heron and kingfisher call reside in the valley, while Canada geese and sandhill cranes pass through on migrating. Catfish, bluegill, sunfish, smallmouth bass, largemouth bass, and gar inhabit the river. The reptilian fauna includes rattlesnakes, skinks and salamanders.

== People ==
The Rolling Fork is an essential part of the communities on or by it. The river valleys provide crop ground for farming operations and help provide in the local economy. The river is used for fishing, and the area around it is hunted for recreation.

=== Communities on the Rolling Fork ===
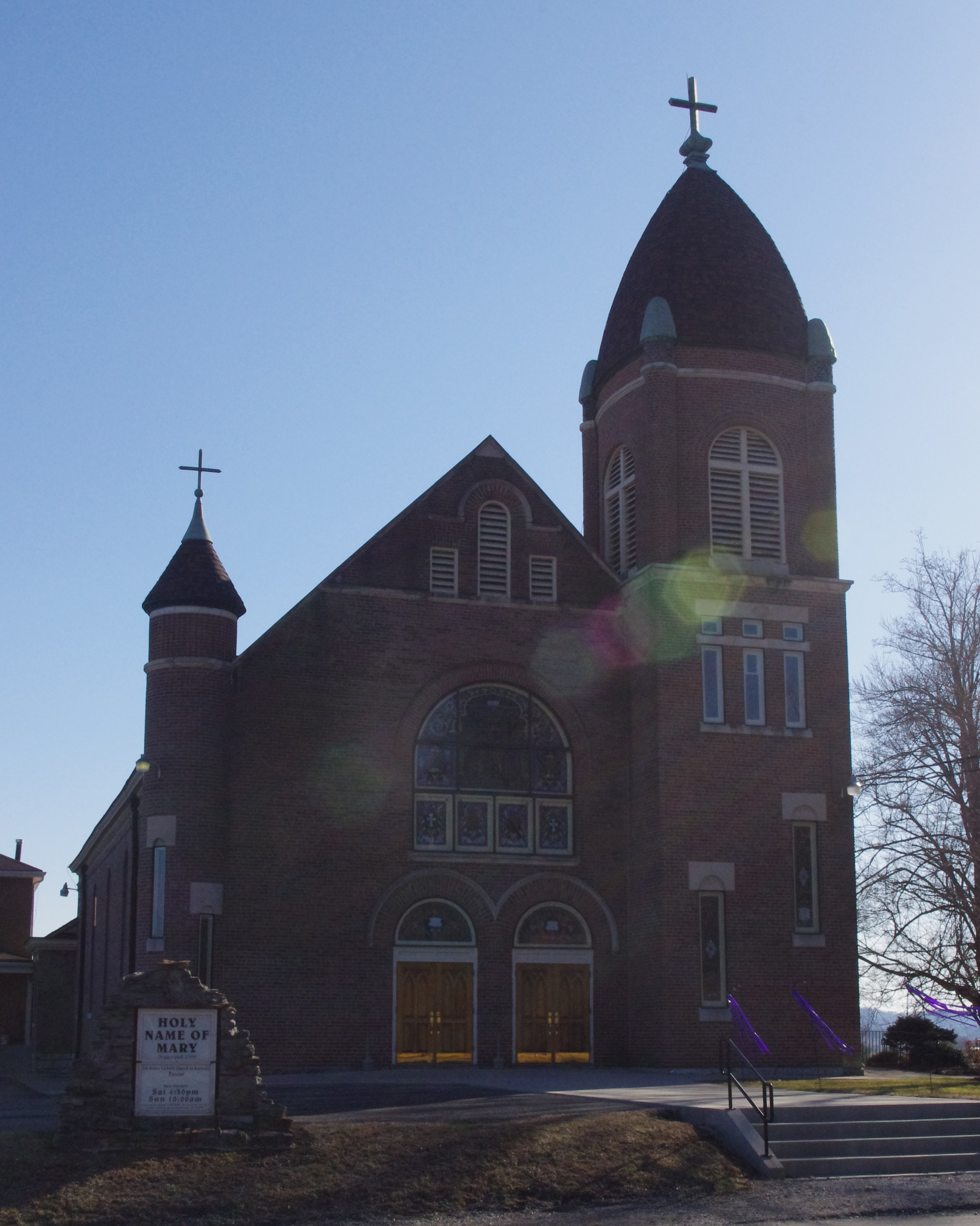
Holy Name of Mary Church (Calvary, Kentucky)

- Calvary, Kentucky (in Marion County)
- Raywick, Kentucky (Marion County)
- High View, Kentucky (Marion County)
- Gleanings, Kentucky (LaRue County)
- Howardstown, Kentucky (Nelson County)
- New Haven, Kentucky (Nelson County)
- Boston, Kentucky (Nelson County)
- Lebanon Junction, Kentucky (Bullitt County)
- Lyon Station, Kentucky (LaRue County)
- Youngers Creek, Kentucky (Hardin County)
- Bradfordsville, Kentucky (Marion County)
- Gravel Switch, Kentucky (Marion County)
- Forkland, Kentucky (Boyle County)

== See also ==
- List of rivers of Kentucky
