= Kentucky Route 425 =

State highway in Kentucky, United States

Kentucky Route 425
- KY 425 highlighted in red

Route information
- Maintained by KYTC
- Length: 4.747 mi (7.640 km)

Major junctions
- West end: US 60 / KY 136 in Henderson
- East end: US 41 / KY 136 / KY 2084 in Henderson

Location
- Country: United States
- State: Kentucky
- Counties: Henderson

Highway system
- Kentucky State Highway System; Interstate; US; State; Parkways
← KY 424	→ KY 426

Kentucky Route 425 (or Henderson Bypass) is the Southern Beltline around Henderson, Kentucky. It is a two-lane road that runs from U.S. Route 60 (US 60) and KY 136 east to Pennyrile Parkway (future I-69) and intersects with US 41A, KY 1299, and US 41. It is a rural highway that is all [at grade intersections. At the US 41A junction, rumble strips are used to alert traffic to the intersections.

== Route description ==
KY 425 begins at an intersection with US 60 and KY 136 west of Henderson, heading southeast on the two-lane undivided Henderson Bypass. The road passes through farmland with some development and comes to a bridge over an abandoned railroad line. The route curves east and comes to an intersection with US 41 Alt. KY 425 passes through more agricultural areas to the south of Henderson and intersects KY 1299. The road comes to a bridge over a CSX railroad line before intersecting US 41, KY 136, and KY 2084, where the road terminates.

== History ==
The highway was built in the 1980s, and in the intervening years has undergone occasional repair and maintenance work. Sufficient right-of-way exists to expand the road to four lanes, but there are no firm plans to do so.

The earliest known KY 425 (as the original route is unknown) was formed in 1955, running from KY 837 in Casey County northwest via Calvary Ridge Road to Black Road.

A later KY 425 was formed ca. 1967 as a loop off of US 127 in Lawrenceburg; this became part of rerouted US 127 by 1973.

== Major intersections ==
The entire route is in Henderson County.

Location	mi	km	Destinations	Notes
Henderson	0.000	0.000	US 60 / KY 136 – Morganfield	Western terminus
	2.429	3.909	US 41 Alt.	
	3.398	5.469	KY 1299	
	4.747	7.640	US 41 (KY 136 and KY 2084) – Henderson	Eastern terminus
1.000 mi = 1.609 km; 1.000 km = 0.621 mi
