= West Louisville, Kentucky =

Unincorporated community in Kentucky, United States

- Unincorporated community
- Location within Kentucky Location within the United States
- Coordinates: 37°41′48″N 87°17′13″W
- Country: United States
- State: Kentucky
- County: Daviess

Area
  - Total: 0.11 sq mi (0.28 km^{2})
  - Land: 0.10 sq mi (0.27 km^{2})
  - Water: 0.0039 sq mi (0.01 km^{2})
- Elevation: 456 ft (139 m)

Population (2020)
  - Total: 40
  - Density: 381.7/sq mi (147.36/km^{2})
- Time zone: UTC-6 (Central (CST))
  - Summer (DST): UTC-5 (CDT)
- ZIP code: 42377
- Area codes: 270 & 364
- GNIS feature ID: 506462

West Louisville is an unincorporated community in Daviess County, Kentucky, United States. As of the 2020 census, West Louisville had a population of 40. The community is located at the intersection of Kentucky Route 56 and Kentucky Route 815, 11 miles (18 km) west-southwest of Owensboro. West Louisville has a post office with ZIP code 42377.

== Demographics ==
Historical population
Census	Pop.	Note	%±
2020	40		—
U.S. Decennial Census
