= Concordia, Kentucky =

Unincorporated community in Kentucky, United States

Coordinates: 38°03′32″N 86°25′41″W

Concordia is an unincorporated community in Meade County, Kentucky, in the United States.

== History ==
Concordia was incorporated in 1869. A post office called Concordia was established in 1880, and remained in operation until it was discontinued in 1967.
