= Scalf, Kentucky =

Unincorporated community in Kentucky, United States

- Unincorporated community
- Location within Kentucky Location within the United States
- Coordinates: 36°55′6″N 83°42′1″W
- Country: United States
- State: Kentucky
- County: Knox
- Elevation: 1,056 ft (322 m)
- Time zone: UTC-5 (Eastern (EST))
  - Summer (DST): UTC-4 (EDT)
- ZIP codes: 40982
- GNIS feature ID: 515279

Scalf is an unincorporated community within Knox County, Kentucky, United States. It is located on the intersection of Hubbard Branch Rd and Stinking Creek Rd.
