= Smith Mills, Kentucky =

Unincorporated community in Kentucky, United States

- Unincorporated community
- Location within Kentucky Location within the United States
- Coordinates: 37°47′54″N 87°45′43″W
- Country: United States
- State: Kentucky
- County: Henderson
- Elevation: 410 ft (120 m)
- Time zone: UTC-6 (Central (CST))
  - Summer (DST): UTC-5 (CST)
- ZIP codes: 42457
- GNIS feature ID: 503801

Smith Mills is an unincorporated community and coal town in Henderson County, Kentucky, United States. Their post office opened in May 1820.

John Miller Cooper was born in Smith Mills.
