= Beechmont, Muhlenberg County, Kentucky =

Census-designated place in Kentucky, United States

Beechmont, Kentucky
- Census-designated place
- Location within Kentucky Location within the United States
- Coordinates: 37°10′28″N 87°1′57″W
- Country: United States
- State: Kentucky
- County: Muhlenberg

Area
  - Total: 1.83 sq mi (4.73 km^{2})
  - Land: 1.82 sq mi (4.71 km^{2})
  - Water: 0.0077 sq mi (0.02 km^{2})
- Elevation: 463 ft (141 m)

Population (2020)
  - Total: 776
  - Density: 426.6/sq mi (164.72/km^{2})
- Time zone: UTC-6 (Central (CST))
  - Summer (DST): UTC-5 (CST)
- ZIP code: 42323
- Area code: 270
- FIPS code: 21-05014
- GNIS feature ID: 486750

Beechmont is a census-designated place and unincorporated community in Muhlenberg County, Kentucky, United States. As of the 2020 census, the population was 776, up from 689 in 2010. The Beechmont post office is located at 3736 Merle Travis Highway. Old National Bank (ONB) is also located at 3740 Merle Travis Highway.

== Geography ==
Beechmont is in southeastern Muhlenberg County, along U.S. Route 431, which leads north 3.5 miles (5.6 km) to Drakesboro and south 7 miles (11 km) to Dunmor. Greenville, the county seat, is 9 miles (14 km) to the northwest.

According to the U.S. Census Bureau, the Beechmont CDP has a total area of 1.83 square miles (4.7 km^{2}), of which 0.006 square miles (0.016 km^{2}), or 0.33%, are water. The town drains west to Beech Creek, south to Hazel Creek, east to Little Hazel Creek, and north to Plum Creek, all of which are within the Green River watershed.

== Demographics ==
Historical population
Census	Pop.	Note	%±
2010	689		—
2020	776		12.6%
U.S. Decennial Census
