= Madisonville Commercial Historic District =

Historic district in Kentucky, United States

- U.S. National Register of Historic Places
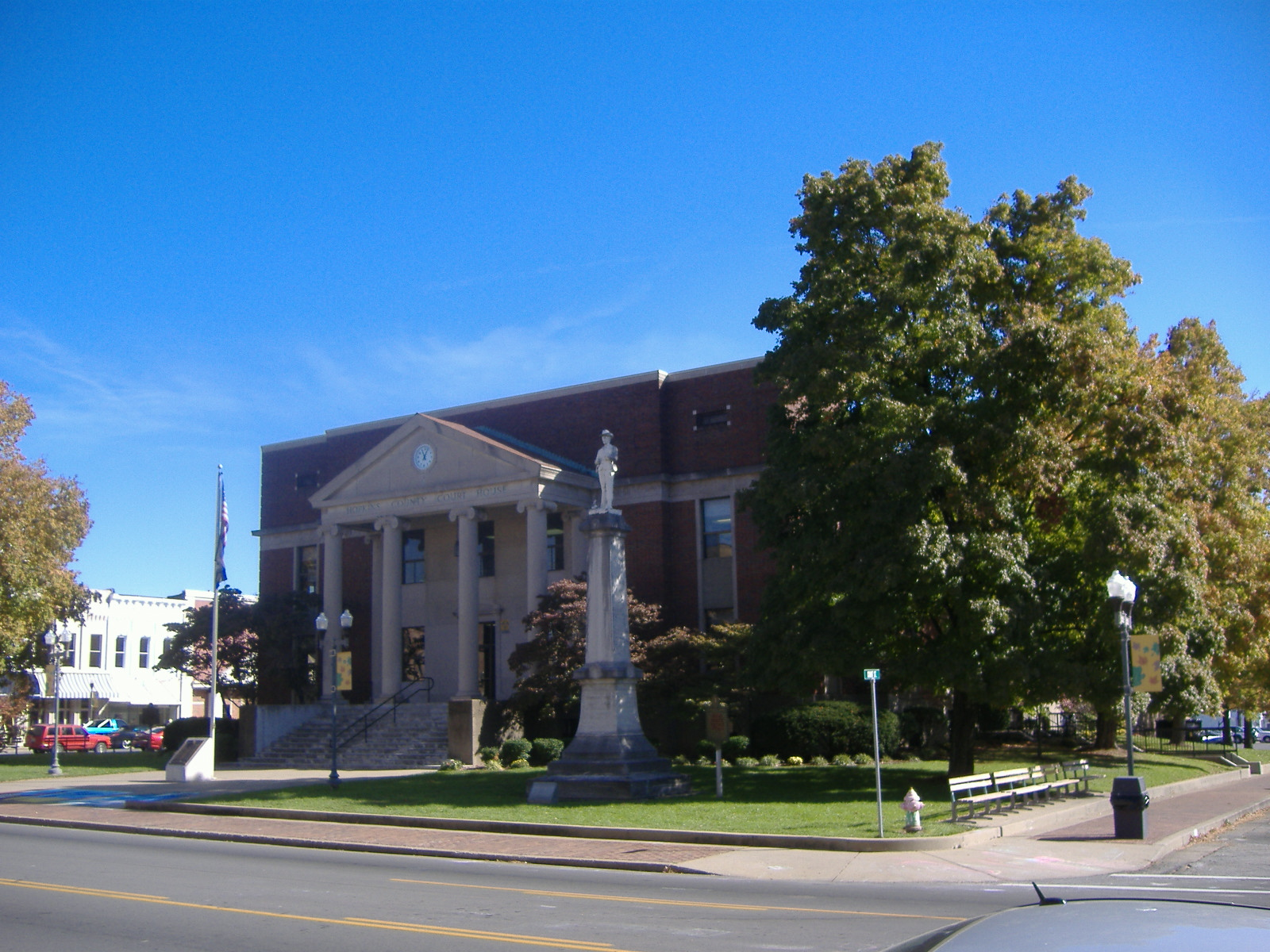
- Hopkins County Courthouse

- Location within Kentucky Location within the United States
- Location: Center and Main Sts., Madisonville, Kentucky
- Coordinates: 37°19′40″N 87°29′55″W
- Area: 11 acres (4.5 ha)
- Architect: George Morton
- Architectural style: Chicago, Late Victorian, Commercial Style
- MPS: Hopkins County MPS
- NRHP reference No.: 88002712
- Added to NRHP: December 13, 1988

The Madisonville Commercial Historic District, in Madisonville, Kentucky, is an 11 acres (4.5 ha) historic district which was listed on the National Register of Historic Places in 1988. The listing included 28 contributing buildings on 11 acres (4.5 ha).

The Hopkins County Courthouse, is the only building in the district which is free-standing, upon the public square; the others are in rows. It includes much of the historic commercial and governmental center of Madisonville.

The courthouse was built in 1938 and has a Doric-style portico.

It includes a two-and-a-half-story brick and stone Richardsonian Romanesque bank building, the Morton Bank, at 7 North Main St., built around 1890.

It is centered upon Center and Main Streets.
