= Kenvir, Kentucky =

Unincorporated community in Kentucky, United States

- Census-designated place
- Location within Kentucky Location within the United States
- Coordinates: 36°51′13″N 83°09′26″W
- Country: United States
- State: Kentucky
- County: Harlan

Area
  - Total: 0.29 sq mi (0.76 km^{2})
  - Land: 0.29 sq mi (0.76 km^{2})
  - Water: 0 sq mi (0.00 km^{2})
- Elevation: 1,457 ft (444 m)

Population (2020)
  - Total: 204
  - Density: 698.1/sq mi (269.53/km^{2})
- Time zone: UTC-5 (Eastern (EST))
  - Summer (DST): UTC-4 (EDT)
- ZIP code: 40828
- Area code: 606
- GNIS feature ID: 495684

Kenvir is a census-designated place and unincorporated community in Harlan County, Kentucky, United States. As of the 2020 census, Kenvir had a population of 204. It is located 8 miles east of Harlan, the county seat of Harlan County. The area is known locally as Black Mountain.

== History ==
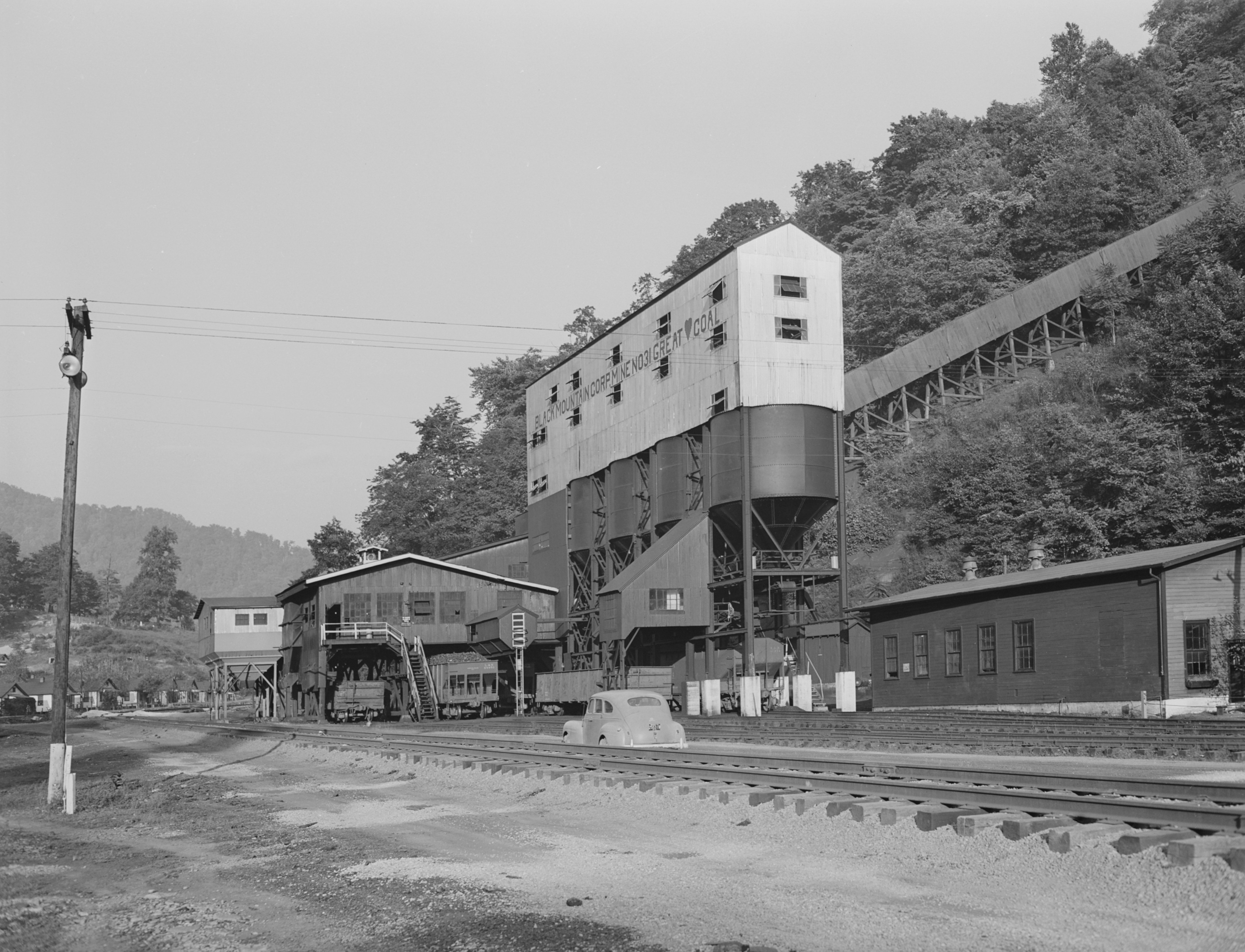
Tipple of Mine #31, Black Mountain Coal Company, in Kenvir during September 1946

Kenvir was founded by the Black Mountain Coal Company in 1919 on Yocum Creek, a tributary of the Clover Fork. It was named for its closeness to the Kentucky-Virginia border. In January 1921, the Dizney post office was moved to serve the area, and was renamed to Kenvir, with Roscoe Weaver as its postmaster. The Kenvir post office continues to serve the area with the ZIP Code 40847. At its peak, Kenvir had a population of 5,000, two schools, a hospital, five churches, and a movie theater.

== Demographics ==
Historical population
| Census | Pop. | Note | %± |
|---|---|---|---|
| 2020 | 204 | | — |
U.S. Decennial Census

As of the 2020 census, Kenvir had a population of 204 people, down from 297 at the 2010 census.
