= Evarts, Kentucky =

- City
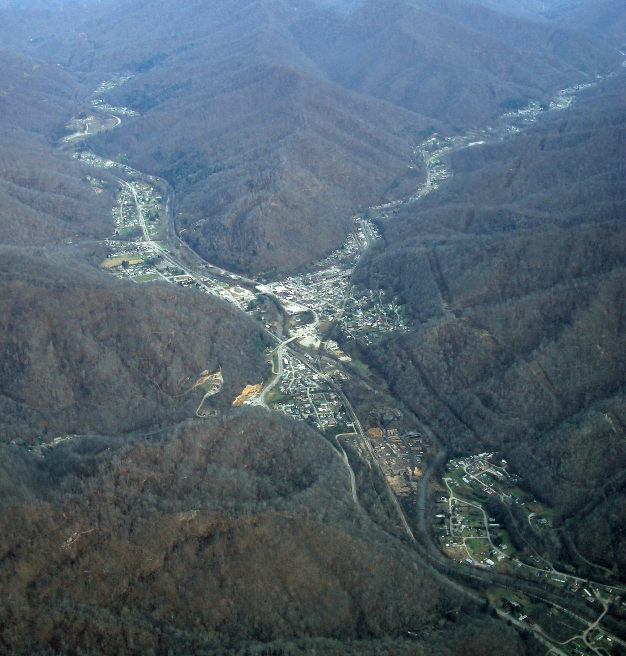
- Evarts from the air

- Location of Evarts in Harlan County, Kentucky.
- Coordinates: 36°51′50″N 83°11′39″W
- Country: United States
- State: Kentucky
- County: Harlan
- Incorporated: 1921

Government
  - Type: Mayor-Council
  - Mayor: Eddie Manning

Area
  - Total: 0.40 sq mi (1.03 km^{2})
  - Land: 0.38 sq mi (0.99 km^{2})
  - Water: 0.015 sq mi (0.04 km^{2})
- Elevation: 1,570 ft (480 m)

Population (2020)
  - Total: 859
  - Density: 2,245.8/sq mi (867.11/km^{2})
- Time zone: UTC-5 (Eastern (EST))
  - Summer (DST): UTC-4 (EDT)
- ZIP code: 40828
- Area code: 606
- FIPS code: 21-25606
- GNIS feature ID: 0491839
- Website: evartskentucky.com

Evarts is a home rule-class city in Harlan County, Kentucky, in the United States. The post office was opened on February 9, 1855, and named for one of the area's pioneer families. The city was formally incorporated by the state assembly in 1921. As of the 2020 census, Evarts had a population of 859.

== Geography ==
Evarts is in central Harlan County, in the valley of the Clover Fork of the Cumberland River, where it is joined from the southeast by the valley of Yocum Creek. Kentucky Route 38 (Main Street) follows the Clover Fork, leading northeast (upstream) 21 miles (34 km) to the Virginia border near Keokee, and southwest (downstream) 8 miles (13 km) to Harlan, the county seat. Kentucky Route 215 runs southeast from Evarts up the Yocum Creek valley through Kenvir 5 miles (8 km) to Dizney.

According to the United States Census Bureau, Evarts has a total area of 0.40 square miles (1.04 km^{2}), of which 0.02 square miles (0.04 km^{2}), or 4.07%, are water.

== Demographics ==
Historical population
Census	Pop.	Note	%±
1920	502		—
1930	1,438		186.5%
1940	1,642		14.2%
1950	1,937		18.0%
1960	1,473		−24.0%
1970	1,182		−19.8%
1980	1,234		4.4%
1990	1,063		−13.9%
2000	1,101		3.6%
2010	962		−12.6%
2020	859		−10.7%
U.S. Decennial Census

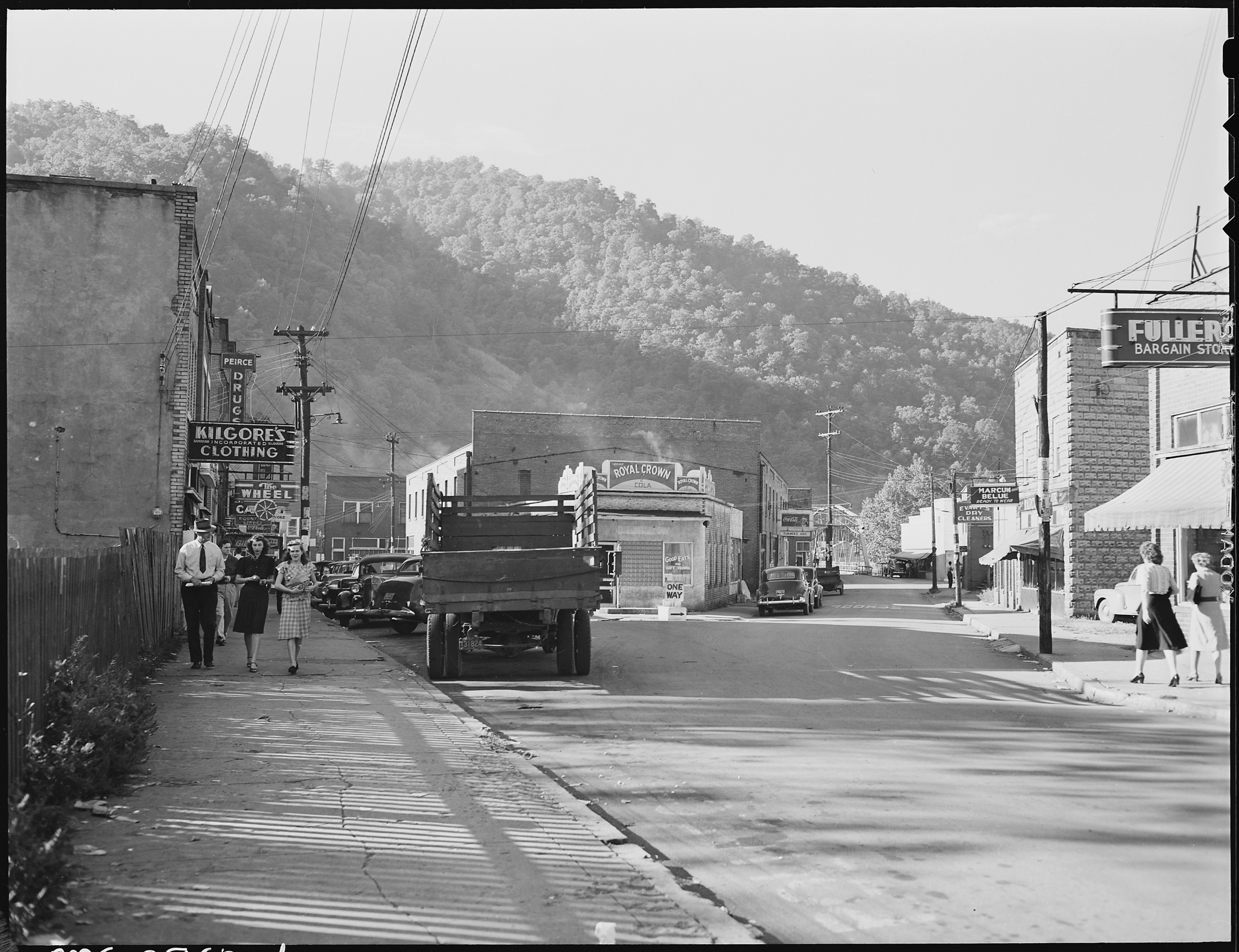
Evarts in 1946. Photo by Russell Lee.

As of the census of 2000, there were 1,101 people, 428 households, and 299 families residing in the city. The population density was 1,828.0 inhabitants per square mile (705.8/km^{2}). There were 490 housing units at an average density of 813.6 per square mile (314.1/km^{2}). The racial makeup of the city was 94.91% White, 2.82% African American, 0.09% Native American, 0.09% Asian, 0.45% from other races, and 1.63% from two or more races. Hispanic or Latino of any race were 0.64% of the population.

There were 428 households, out of which 31.1% had children under the age of 18 living with them, 50.7% were married couples living together, 15.9% had a female householder with no husband present, and 30.1% were non-families. 26.9% of all households were made up of individuals, and 13.6% had someone living alone who was 65 years of age or older. The average household size was 2.57 and the average family size was 3.13.

In the city, the population was spread out, with 28.4% under the age of 18, 7.8% from 18 to 24, 26.4% from 25 to 44, 23.7% from 45 to 64, and 13.6% who were 65 years of age or older. The median age was 36 years. For every 100 females, there were 92.1 males. For every 100 females age 18 and over, there were 85.0 males.

The median income for a household in the city was $17,963, and the median income for a family was $22,159. Males had a median income of $26,125 versus $18,125 for females. The per capita income for the city was $12,657. About 31.3% of families and 37.3% of the population were below the poverty line, including 52.7% of those under age 18 and 23.1% of those age 65 or over.

== Government ==
Evarts is controlled by a mayor–council form of government. The city's current mayor is Eddie Manning. Previous mayor, Burl Fee, died on September 7, 2011. Current members of the city council are: Preston McLain, Jackie Renfro, Ernie Woodard, Jaysin Stallard, Renee Doan, and Larry Caudill. The representative body of the city is the city council.

== Education ==
The city of Evarts is served by Harlan County Public Schools. The district operates Evarts Elementary School, Black Mountain Elementary School, and Harlan County High School.

Evarts has a lending library, a branch of the Harlan County Public Library.

== See also ==
- Battle of Evarts
- Black Mountain Off-Road Adventure Area
