= Holmes Mill, Kentucky =

Unincorporated community in Kentucky, United States

- Unincorporated community
- Location within Kentucky Location within the United States
- Coordinates: 36°52′6″N 83°00′9″W
- Country: United States
- State: Kentucky
- County: Harlan
- Elevation: 1,814 ft (553 m)
- Time zone: UTC-5 (Eastern (EST))
  - Summer (DST): UTC-4 (EDT)
- ZIP code: 40843
- Area code: 606
- GNIS feature ID: 508269

Holmes Mill is an unincorporated community in Harlan County, Kentucky, United States. The population of Holmes Mill is 259 people.
