= Brookside, Kentucky =

Unincorporated community in Kentucky, United States

- Unincorporated community
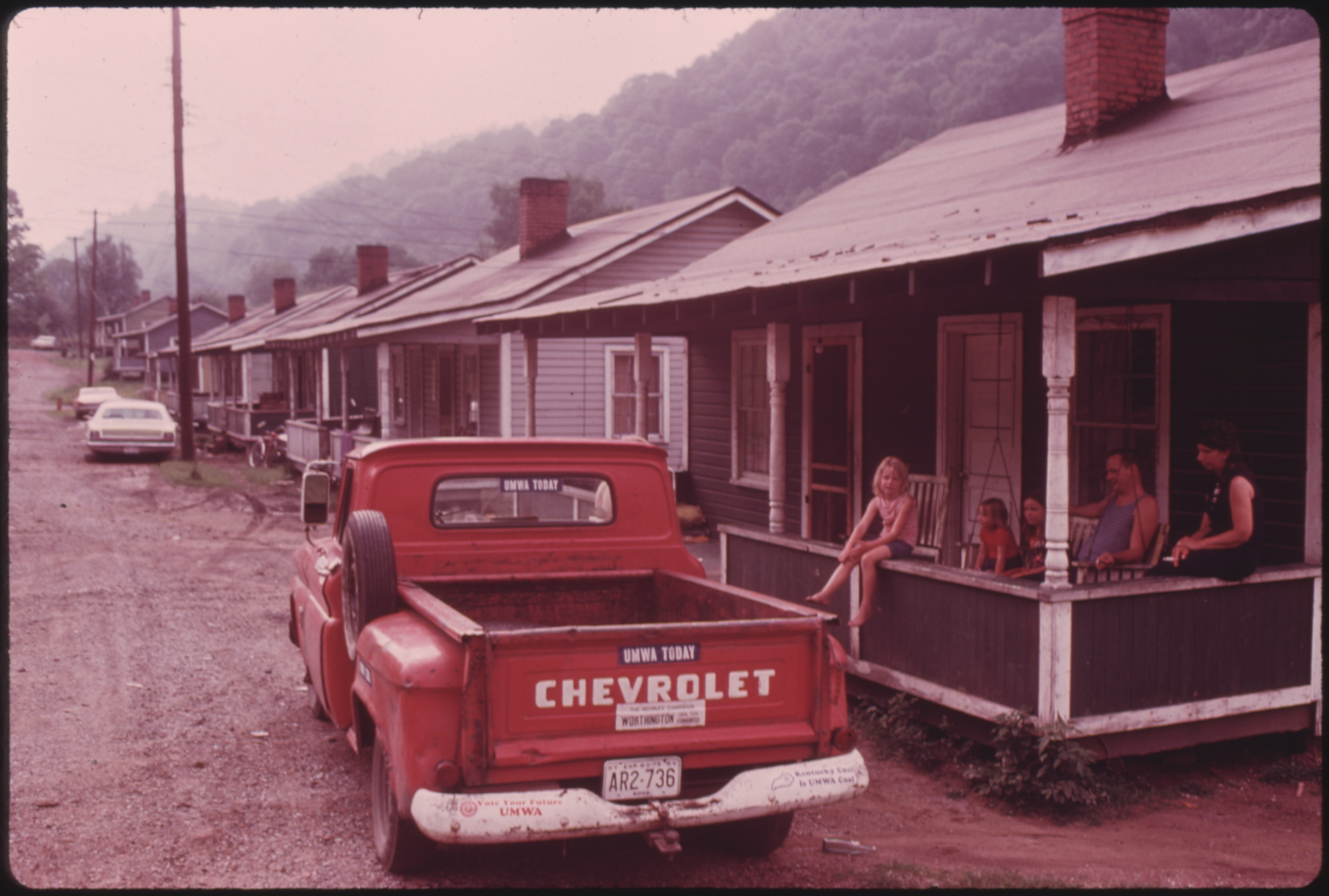
- Row of miners' homes, 1974

- Location within Kentucky Location within the United States
- Coordinates: 36°51′33″N 83°14′58″W
- Country: United States
- State: Kentucky
- County: Harlan
- Elevation: 1,257 ft (383 m)
- Time zone: UTC-6 (Central (CST))
  - Summer (DST): UTC-5 (CST)
- GNIS feature ID: 487970

Brookside is an unincorporated community and coal town in Harlan County, Kentucky, United States.

A post office called Brookside was established in 1930, and the name was changed to Ages-Brookside in 1975.
