= Dizney, Kentucky =

Unincorporated community in Kentucky, United States

- Unincorporated community
- Location within Kentucky Location within the United States
- Coordinates: 36°51′10″N 83°7′0″W
- Country: United States
- State: Kentucky
- County: Harlan
- Elevation: 1,660 ft (510 m)
- Time zone: UTC-5 (Eastern (EST))
  - Summer (DST): UTC-4 (EST)
- ZIP codes: 40825
- GNIS feature ID: 490935

Dizney is an unincorporated community in Harlan County, Kentucky, United States. Its post office was active from 1918 until 1993.

Dizney was most likely named for local educator Elizah Franklin Dizney.
