= Coal town =

Residential towns for employed miners and their families

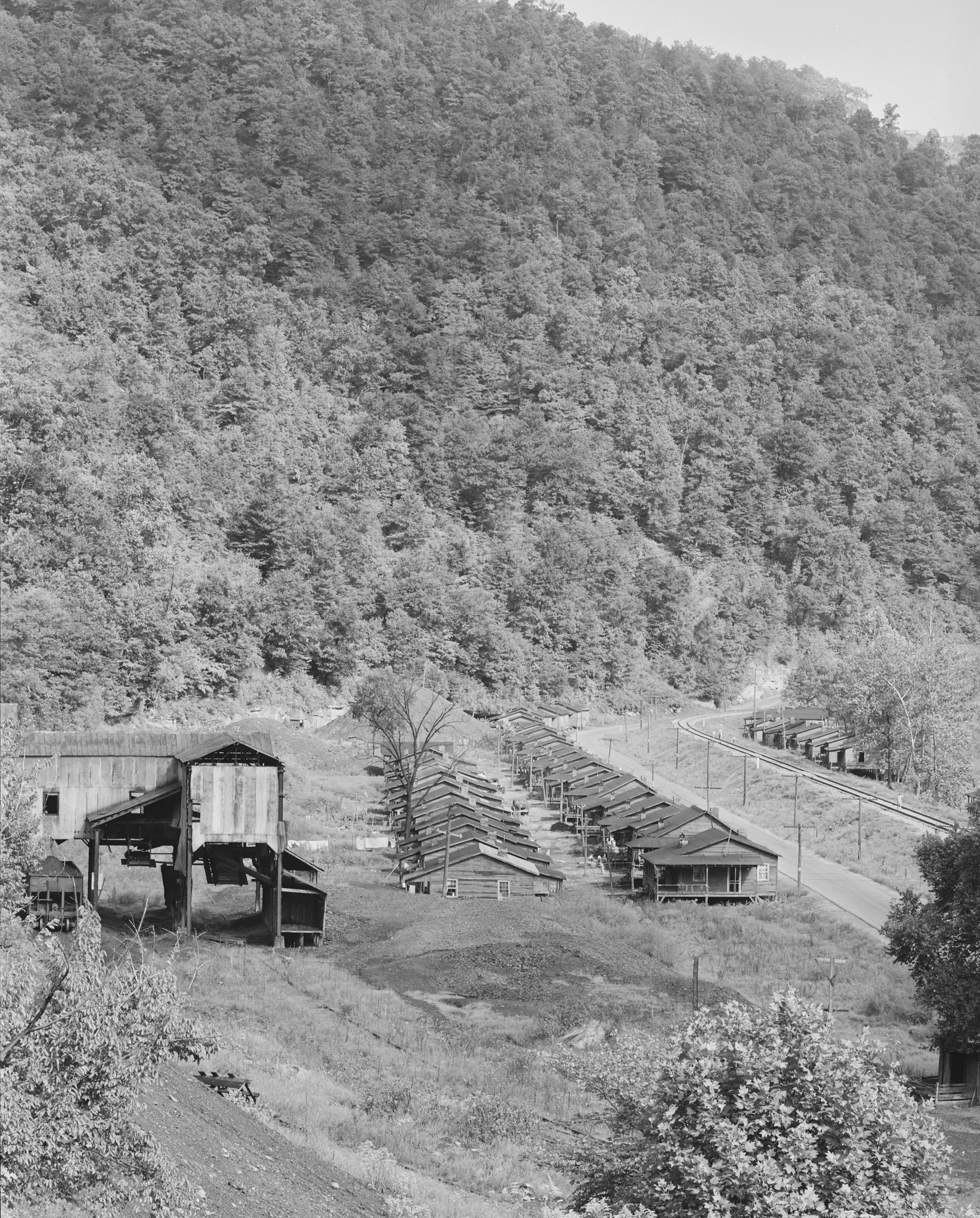
Company houses for miners employed by the Benito Mining Company, Benito, Kentucky, 1946

A coal town, also known as a coal camp or patch, is a type of company town or mining community established by the employer, a mining company, which imports workers to the site to work the mineral find. The company develops it and provides residences for a population of miners and related workers to reside near the coal mine.

From the 1850s to the 1950s these company towns became a structural necessity for the bituminous coal industry. Built rapidly and strictly for utility, these settlements allowed coal operators to house a large imported labor force in remote areas while maintaining tight social and economic control with the threat of expulsion from the only available housing.

== Background ==
Usually, the coal camp, like the railroad camp and logging camps, began with temporary storage, housing and dining facilities —tents, shanties, shacks— until more permanent dwellings could be built. Often the first structures to be built were log cabin storehouses, followed by kitchens, a lumber mill and smithies, management offices, and housing.

Gradually, within a year or so, the camp would be developed as a community with a variety of housing types, including boardinghouses for transients and new hires. Typically the community was organized around a Company Store. The company would often give credit to workers in the form of scrip, a form of token money that would discourage workers from purchasing items in stores outside the town. For the wives and families who joined the miners in such a community, the company store was perhaps "the most essential structure in the town...".

The coal operator would normally divest unprofitable lands as soon as possible, rather than paying land taxes. It recouped some capital by sub-dividing the tract and selling lots and eventually the housing it had built. Structures such as churches and schools were built as the community grew. The employer might donate funds to aid these, but typically they were financed by residents of the community.

Given the typically remote locations of mines and the absence of any travel infrastructure serving the mines, 'coal camps' often became a part of being a coal miner.

In point of fact, the operators built towns because they had no alternative. The mining of coal requires miners; miners require houses. Since most mines were opened in virtually unsettled areas, there was no existing housing....Since the almost complete absence of all weather roads made it necessary for the miner to live close to his work, small villages (often called "camps") were built close to each mine.

— William Tams, The Smokeless Coal Fields of West Virginia: A Brief History

== Living conditions ==
Towns were designed by mine engineers rather than architects. Construction was kept cheap because the lifespan of the town was tied to the finite life of the coal in the mine. Unlike traditional towns, cities, the location was based entirely on access to coal seams rather than transportation routes or comfort. The typical result was isolated, primitive living conditions, with no alternative available for the miners. Mining companies used these towns to attract workers, reduce turnover, and extract additional profit through rents and retail sales. Accommodations ranged from single-family frames to crowded duplexes. Most lacked electricity, indoor plumbing, or insulation. Most families had their own gardens and often raised poultry and pigs. Many coal towns featured company-funded public schools and church buildings. Accidents in the mine were common, so there was free medical care provided by company doctors, nurses and midwives. The company store—called "the commissary"—served as the town’s social center. It housed the U.S. Post Office. Locals socialized and used it as the primary source for purchasing food and new clothing.

== See also ==
- Boomtown
- Coal company scrip
- Pit village, a type of coal town in the United Kingdom
