= National Register of Historic Places listings in Knott County, Kentucky =

Location of Knott County in Kentucky

This is a list of the National Register of Historic Places listings in Knott County, Kentucky.

It is intended to be a complete list of the properties on the National Register of Historic Places in Knott County, Kentucky, United States. The locations of National Register properties for which the latitude and longitude coordinates are included below, may be seen in a map.

There are 5 properties listed on the National Register in the county.

This National Park Service list is complete through NPS recent listings posted March 21, 2025.

== Current listings ==
	Name on the Register	Image	Date listed	Location	City or town	Description
1	Bolen Building	Bolen Building	July 11, 2007 (#07000676)	85 W. Main St. 37°20′05″N 82°58′55″W	Hindman	
2	Hindman Ben Franklin	Hindman Ben Franklin	August 23, 2007 (#07000675)	16 W. Main St. 37°20′08″N 82°58′54″W	Hindman	
3	Hindman Historic District	Hindman Historic District	March 27, 2013 (#13000112)	Along Main St. and Kentucky Route 160; 37°20′07″N 82°58′52″W	Hindman	
4	Hiram and Art Stamper House		January 8, 2014 (#13001053)	864 Stamper Branch Rd. 37°22′38″N 82°57′37″W	Hindman	
5	Wolfpen		January 7, 2014 (#12001200)	105 Dead Mare Branch; 37°14′19″N 82°55′28″W	Mallie	

== Former listing ==
	Name on the Register	Image	Date listed	Date removed	Location	City or town	Description
1	Dr. Jasper Stewart House		April 18, 1977 (#77001559)	November 1, 1978	North of Hindman	Hindman	

== See also ==
- List of National Historic Landmarks in Kentucky
- National Register of Historic Places listings in Kentucky
