= Kentucky Route 582 =

State highway in Kentucky, United States

Kentucky Route 582
- KY 582 highlighted in red

Route information
- Maintained by KYTC
- Length: 12.729 mi (20.485 km)

Major junctions
- West end: KY 160 near Littcarr
- East end: KY 7 at Kite

Location
- Country: United States
- State: Kentucky
- Counties: Knott

Highway system
- Kentucky State Highway System; Interstate; US; State; Parkways
← KY 581	→ KY 583

Kentucky Route 582 (KY 582) is a 12.729-mile-long (20.485 km) state highway in Knott County, Kentucky, that runs from KY 160 northeast of Littcarr to KY 7 at Kite via Spider, Pine Top, Nealy, May, Omaha, and Martinsville.

== Major intersections ==
The entire route is in Knott County.

Location	mi	km	Destinations	Notes
	0.000	0.000	KY 160	
	3.747	6.030	KY 1393 north (Branhams Creek Road)	Southern terminus of KY 1393
	12.729	20.485	KY 7	Eastern terminus
1.000 mi = 1.609 km; 1.000 km = 0.621 mi
