= Wolf Pen =

Wolf Pen or Wolfpen may refer to:

- Wolf Pen, Arkansas in Carroll County, Arkansas
- Wolfpen (Mallie, Kentucky), listed on the National Register of Historic Places in Knott County, Kentucky
- Wolf Pen, West Virginia in Wyoming County
- Wolfpen Creek (Kansas), a stream in Kansas
- Wolfpen Creek (Indian Creek tributary), a stream in Missouri
- Wolfpen Ridge, a ridge in Georgia
