= Wolfpen Creek =

Wolfpen Creek may refer to:

- Wolfpen Creek (Kansas), a stream in Kansas
- Wolfpen Creek (Indian Creek tributary), a stream in Missouri
