= Vest, Kentucky =

Post office in Kentucky, United States

- post office
- Location within Kentucky Location within the United States
- Coordinates: 37°23′48″N 83°00′24″W
- Country: United States
- State: Kentucky
- County: Knott
- Time zone: UTC-5 (Eastern (EST))
  - Summer (DST): UTC-4 (EDT)
- ZIP code: 41772
- Area code: 606

Vest is a post office in Knott County, Kentucky, United States, at the mouth of the Trace Branch of Balls Fork. It serves a store, a crafts centre, and a school.

== Geography ==
Vest is located at Lat: 37.39667, Lon: -83.00667. It sits at 1,090 feet (332.232 meters) above sea level. Vest, Kentucky is in the Eastern Time Zone (EST) and observes Daylight Savings Time.

== Population and demographics ==
The total population for Vest is 277.

== Infrastructure ==
=== Transportation and roads ===
The main road that runs through Vest is KY-1087. From its start at the junction of KY-1087 and KY-550 to its end where it splits into KY-476, it runs about 20 miles long.

The second road that runs from just in front of the Vest building is KY-160.

=== Public and private education ===
Beckham Combs Elementary School, named after Beckham Combs (a former person in Knott County), was the elementary school near Vest until its closure in 2006. During its time open as a public elementary school, it offered education for children aged kindergarten through eighth grade. On average 136 students attended the school and there were 8 classroom teachers. Now that the school is closed, most students attend school in Hindman, Kentucky at Hindman Elementary School and Knott County Central High School.

In the former elementary school's place, an attempt to open Beckham Combs Community Center was made. But it was permanently closed when the Big Branch Baptist Church purchased the building for church use and also to use it for the Bethel Christian Academy.

In addition to the private and public school options, the Hindman Settlement School offers support for families that are interested in preserving and continuing the unique way of life available in the eastern Kentucky Appalachian Mountains.

=== Cemeteries ===
While there are many family cemeteries located in and around Vest, a few notable ones are the Oscar Ritchie Cemetery (located right on the junction of KY-1087 and KY-160), the Dobson Cemetery (located across a now nonexistent bridge and up a hill on KY-1087), the Sutton-Combs Cemetery, and the Alonzo Dobson Cemetery (located off of KY-1087 on Alonzo Dobson Family Cemetery Rd just before Johnson Lick Rd). Many more cemeteries are in and around Vest, but most are private or forgotten to time.

== Local culture ==
=== Knott County Trail Ride ===
One of the biggest annual events for the residents of Vest is the Knott County Trail Ride. While the Mine Made Adventure Park and Campground is a popular place for outdoor enthusiasts, the first weekend in October every year is when the "Knott County Trail Ride" takes place. Described as a carnival, the Knott County Trail Ride is a gathering of locals and people who enjoy camping, music, horse-back riding, and four wheel drive vehicles on the trails and roads around the camping area. Much of the trail ride occurs in Sutton Memorial Park, a vast parcel of land donated to the county by the Sutton family.

=== "Buckhorn" ===
A popular cultural pastime in any small southern town is going riding. During the summertime in Vest, one of the more popular places to ride ATVs, dirt bikes, four-wheelers, horses, or even in more rugged vehicles is Buckhorn. While there is a Buckhorn, Kentucky in Perry County, going to Buckhorn in Vest actually refers to taking a ride up Buckhorn Creek Rd. The road itself runs perpendicular to Balls Fork of Troublesome Creek and is a rough dirt road. People camp and build fires at the end of the road during the summer. There are a few unnamed parts of the road that follow along different branches of Ball's Fork.
