= River of Earth =

1940 novel by James Still

First edition (publ. Viking Press)

River of Earth is a novel, published in 1940, by the Appalachian author James Still.

== Plot synopsis ==
The book focuses on three years in the life of an Appalachian family as told from the viewpoint of a young boy. The boy watches as his parents are pulled between their meager but independent life as farmers, and the uncertain promise of prosperity offered by the mining camps in Appalachia.

== Publication ==
The book was published in 1940, within a year of The Grapes of Wrath, and by the same publisher. The cabin that appears on the cover of the newest edition was located in Knott County, Kentucky, where Still lived for about 50 years.

== Reception ==
Many issues arise from a discussion of the differences and similarities between River of Earth and Grapes of Wrath. Critic Dean Cadle notes that these are the only books chronicling the demoralizing Depression years; Steinbeck's novel about the dust bowl/1929 crash/depression era, while Still is writing about traumas that span the existence of mountain people in America. Similarly, Ted Olson suggests the work relies on the theme of working-class families vs. socio-economic political systems. Douglas Reichert Powell claims that national epics are about the inevitability of displacement and nomadism. "Place" is then reduced to being stopped, giving up, or resting; while River of Earth is concerned with (even) the “possibility of place”.
