= Rodrick Rhodes =

American basketball player and coach (born 1973)

Personal information
- Born: September 24, 1973 (age 53) Jersey City, New Jersey, U.S.
- Listed height: 6 ft 6 in (1.98 m)
- Listed weight: 225 lb (102 kg)

Career information
- High school: St. Anthony (Jersey City, New Jersey)
- College: Kentucky (1992–1995); USC (1996–1997)
- NBA draft: 1997: 1st round, 24th overall pick
- Drafted by: Houston Rockets
- Playing career: 1997–2003
- Position: Shooting guard / small forward
- Number: 1, 12, 2

Career history
- 1997–1999: Houston Rockets
- 1999: Vancouver Grizzlies
- 2000: Dallas Mavericks
- 2000–2001: Dafni Athens
- 2002: Air21 Express
- 2003: Brooklyn Kings

Career highlights
- McDonald's All-American (1992); First-team Parade All-American (1992); Second-team Parade All-American (1991); Fourth-team Parade All-American (1990)
- Stats at NBA.com
- Stats at Basketball Reference

Rodrick Rhodes (born September 24, 1973) is an American former professional basketball player who was selected by the Houston Rockets in the first round (24th pick overall) of the 1997 NBA draft.

== High school career ==
As a prep player, Rhodes was a superstar from the time he was a freshman. He was a three time Parade All-American, and helped Jersey City's St. Anthony High School, led by Coach Bob Hurley, win two state titles in 1989 and 1991. At one point, he was considered as promising a prospect as future NBA star Jason Kidd.

== College career ==
He played collegiately at the University of Kentucky for three years. He transferred to the University of Southern California for his senior year. Kentucky coach Rick Pitino asked Rhodes to redshirt after his junior year, which is highly unusual and was seen by many, including Rhodes' high school coach Bob Hurley, as a way to force Rhodes out. Kentucky landed star recruit Ron Mercer, considered by many experts the top prep senior in his class (along with Kevin Garnett and Stephon Marbury), and some feel this may be what led to Pitino asking Rhodes to redshirt. However, Pitino also redshirted fellow Kentucky senior-to-be Jared Prickett heading into that same season (1995–96), and Prickett helped lead Kentucky to the NCAA title game the following season, earning more minutes than he would have on Kentucky's deep 1996 championship team. And the following season, Pitino redshirted senior-to-be Jeff Sheppard, who would return to lead Kentucky to its third straight Final Four and an NCAA championship in 1998.

== Professional career ==
Rhodes played for the Rockets, Vancouver Grizzlies and Dallas Mavericks in three NBA seasons. His best year as a professional came during his rookie year as a member of the Rockets, appearing in 58 games and averaging 5.8 ppg.

After leaving the NBA during the 2000 season, Rhodes went overseas and played in professional leagues in Cyprus, Greece, the Philippines, France and Puerto Rico.

== Coaching career ==
Rhodes was an assistant coach at the University of Texas Pan-American, and was previously an assistant coach at the University of Massachusetts and an Administrative Assistant Coach at Seton Hall University, in South Orange, New Jersey. In 2005, he was an assistant coach at St. Edward's University in Austin, Texas, and after enjoying a successful season there, he moved on to become an assistant at Idaho State University in 2006.

In 2011, Rhodes was hired to coach at Cordia High School in Knott County, Kentucky.

In 2014, the Kentucky High School Athletic Association leveled severe sanctions against the Cordia basketball program for alleged violations of KHSAA rules. KHSAA commissioner Julian Tackett stated that Cordia's violations under Rhodes "represent what may well be the most wanton and blatant disregard for association rules in its 97-year history." Rhodes' coaching contract with Cordia School was not renewed.

In 2017, Rhodes was featured in the "Us Against the World" documentary that documented events that occurred during his tenure as Cordia's coach. "Us Against the World" was nominated for an Emmy in 2018.

In 2017–2018, Rhodes was hired as the Assistant Men's Basketball Coach at Northwest Nazarene University.

In 2019, Rhodes was hired by Concordia University-Portland as the head coach for the 2020 season.
