= Elmrock, Kentucky =

Unincorporated community in Kentucky, United States

- Unincorporated community
- Location within Kentucky Location within the United States
- Coordinates: 37°27′08″N 83°01′33″W
- Country: United States
- State: Kentucky
- County: Knott
- Elevation: 1,014 ft (309 m)
- Time zone: UTC-5 (Eastern (EST))
  - Summer (DST): UTC-4 (EDT)
- Area code: 606
- GNIS feature ID: 507932

Elmrock is an unincorporated community in Knott County, Kentucky, United States. Elmrock is located on Kentucky Route 1098 8.4 miles (13.5 km) north-northwest of Hindman. Elmrock had a post office from August 9, 1911, to September 2, 1989. The community was named for a large elm tree and large rock in the town.
