= Sassafras, Kentucky =

Unincorporated community in Kentucky, United States

- Unincorporated community
- Location within Kentucky Location within the United States
- Coordinates: 37°13′14″N 83°03′19″W
- Country: United States
- State: Kentucky
- County: Knott
- Elevation: 948 ft (289 m)
- Time zone: UTC-5 (Eastern (EST))
  - Summer (DST): UTC-4 (EDT)
- ZIP code: 41759
- Area code: 606
- GNIS feature ID: 502996

Sassafras is an unincorporated community in Knott County, Kentucky, United States. Sassafras is located along Kentucky Route 15, 9 miles (14 km) south-southwest of Hindman. Sassafras has a post office with ZIP code 41759.
