= Handschuh =

Handschuh may refer to:

- German word for glove
- Der Handschuh, 1797 ballad by Friedrich Schiller
- Der Handschuh (Waterhouse), 2005 setting to music of Schiller's ballad
- Karl-Heinz Handschuh (born 1947), German football player

== See also ==
- Handshoe, Kentucky
