= Wiscoal, Kentucky =

Unincorporated community in Kentucky, US

- Unincorporated community
- Location within Kentucky Location within the United States
- Coordinates: 37°14′14″N 83°03′22″W
- Country: United States
- State: Kentucky
- County: Knott
- Elevation: 1,125 ft (343 m)
- Time zone: UTC-5 (Eastern (EST))
  - Summer (DST): UTC-4 (EDT)
- Area code: 606
- GNIS feature ID: 509388

Wiscoal is an unincorporated community in Knott County, Kentucky, United States. Wiscoal is 8 miles (13 km) south-southwest of Hindman.

== History ==
The community was named for the Wisconsin Coal Company, which operated a mine and offices there.
