= Anco =

Anco may refer to:

== Places ==
- Anco, Kentucky, US
- Anco District, Churcampa, Peru
- Anco District, La Mar, Peru

== Other ==
- Anco Jansen (born 1989), Dutch footballer
- AnCO (An Chomhairle Oiliúna), Irish training council, predecessor of FÁS and subsequently SOLAS
- ANCO, a brand of wiper blades owned by Trico
- Animal Collective, an American experimental band
