= Patty Hill =

American educator and songwriter (1868–1946)

- Born: Patty Smith Hill; March 27, 1868; Anchorage, Kentucky, U.S.
- Died: May 25, 1946 (aged 78); New York City, U.S.
- Resting place: Cave Hill Cemetery
- Occupations: Composer; teacher
- Notable work: "Happy Birthday to You"
- Relatives: Mildred J. Hill, Jessica Hill (sister)
- Awards: Columbia University (Honorary doctorate), induction into the Songwriters Hall of Fame

Patty Smith Hill (March 27, 1868 – May 25, 1946) was an American composer and teacher who is perhaps best known for co-writing, with her sister Mildred Hill, the tune that later became popular as "Happy Birthday to You". She was an American nursery school, kindergarten teacher, and key founder of the National Association for Nursery Education (NANE) which now exists as the National Association For the Education of Young Children (NAEYC).

== Family and early life ==
Patty Smith Hill was born in 1868 in Anchorage, Kentucky, just outside Louisville. Her parents were passionate people who instilled in Patty and her siblings the importance of education, the value of play, and the necessity of advocating for others. Her father, William Wallace Hill, was born in Bath, Kentucky, graduated from Centre College in Danville, Kentucky, in 1833, and earned a doctorate of Theology from Princeton University in 1838. He dedicated his entire life to ministry and education, which took the Hill family from Kentucky to Missouri to Texas. Her mother, Martha Jane Smith, was William's second wife (his first died in childbirth), and was born in Pennsylvania, but as an adolescent moved with her brother to live with their aunt and uncle on their plantation in Danville. Martha Jane was intent on learning and passing along education to others, evidenced, for example, by the fact that she taught the slaves on the Grimes plantation to read and write.

Hill's parents were committed to their children's education; her father is reported to have told his daughters to understand the value of a good education, and that it was "a tragedy for women to marry for a home. Don't live with law kin! Don't even if you have to live in a hollow tree!" Empowered by her parents' encouragement, Patty graduated valedictorian of her class from the Louisville Collegiate Institute in 1887.

== Career in early childhood education ==
Hill was an authority and leader in the progressive education movement of the late 19th and early 20th centuries. Patty developed the Patty Hill blocks and in 1924 helped create the Institute of Child Welfare Research at Columbia University Teachers College. The Patty Hill blocks were large blocks with which children could create giant constructions. She was a member, President, and lifetime support of the Association for Childhood Education International.

== "Happy Birthday to You" ==
Hill is perhaps best known as the sister of Mildred J. Hill, with whom she is credited as co-writing the tune to the song "Good Morning to All". The tune became even more popular as "Happy Birthday to You" during the 20th century. Hill and her sister Mildred wrote the song (Mildred wrote the tune; Patty wrote the original lyrics) while Mildred was a composer of songs and Patty was principal at the Louisville Experimental Kindergarten School. This kindergarten was an early experiment in modern educational methods, and was honored, along with the Hill sisters, at the Chicago World's Fair in 1893.

== Later life and honors ==
Patty Smith Hill, who never married, was awarded an honorary doctorate degree by Columbia University in 1929. Hill died at her home in New York City, and is buried in Cave Hill Cemetery, Louisville, Kentucky. She and Mildred J. Hill were posthumously inducted into the Songwriters Hall of Fame on June 12, 1996.

== See also ==
- Kenwood Hill – Louisville neighborhood where Patty and sister Mildred occasionally resided
- List of people from the Louisville metropolitan area
