= List of killings by law enforcement officers in the United States, September 2024 =

This is a list of people reported killed by non-military law enforcement officers in the United States in September 2024, whether in the line of duty or not, and regardless of reason or method. The listing documents the occurrence of a death, making no implications regarding wrongdoing or justification on the part of the person killed or officer involved. Killings are arranged by date of the incident that caused death. Different death dates, if known, are noted in the description. The table below lists 102 people.

== September 2024 ==
Date	Name (age) of deceased	Race	Location	Description
2024-09-30	Michael Gabaldon (51)	Hispanic	Los Lunas, New Mexico	During an exchange of gunfire between Gabaldon and a neighbor, police claimed that they saw Gabaldon firing a gun then a deputy shot him.
2024-09-30	Cedric Hayden (35)	Black	Warren, Michigan	Hayden and Pettis were killed when their SUV collided with a Warren Police Department patrol SUV.
2024-09-30	DeJuan Pettis (34)	Black	Warren, Michigan	Hayden and Pettis were killed when their SUV collided with a Warren Police Department patrol SUV.
2024-09-29	unidentified female (32)	Unknown	Anne Arundel County, Maryland	A pedestrian was struck and killed by a Maryland State Police vehicle.
2024-09-29	James V. Afuvai (24)	Pacific Islander	Anchorage, Alaska	An Anchorage Police officer responded to a call concerning a man who was injured. When he was waiting for backup, a man with a knife ran at him before being fatally shot by the officer. Later police found that the suspect was the 911 caller.
2024-09-29	Edward Johnson (37)	Unknown	Mesa, Arizona	At around 2 a.m., a Mesa Police officer attempted to stop a man on a bike, however, the man fled. After they located the man, he allegedly produced a weapon and pointed at them before being fatally shot.
2024-09-28	unidentified male	Unknown	Meridian, Colorado	A suicidal suspect reportedly fired a gun in the air and pointed it at the Douglas County deputies. Deputies then shot and killed him.
2024-09-28	Steven Phipps Jr. (22)	Black	Omaha, Nebraska	In North Omaha, a man was pulled over by an Omaha Police officer for a traffic stop. The driver of the vehicle fled, and after a chase the driver was shot by a police officer after an alleged altercation.
2024-09-28	Paul Simon Fialho (50)	White	Port St. Lucie, Florida	Port St. Lucie Police responded to a domestic violence incident and encountered a man with an explosive device. An officer-involved shooting occurred which left the suspect dead.
2024-09-27	Nicholas Novak (36)	White	Aurora, Illinois	A suspect who shot and killed his father led multiple agencies on a pursuit from Plano to Aurora. The suspect reportedly fired a gun at the police before being fatally shot by a Plano Police officer and a deputy.
2024-09-28	Emilio Aguilar (21)	Hispanic	Smyrna, Georgia	When SPD officers responded to a robbery in progress and attempted to arrest Aguilar, Aguilar shot and injured two officers with a rifle. Three Cobb County police officers arrived on scene then fired at Aguilar, killing him.
2024-09-27	Gene Stewart (46)	Unknown	National City, California	A citizen flagged down a San Diego County Sheriff's Department detective and directed him to the suspect that they were looking for. When the detective approached the suspect who was hiding in a tow truck, the suspect shot at him, at which point the detective returned fire, fatally striking him.
2024-09-27	Michael D. Williams (56)	Unknown	Vancouver, Washington	Williams reportedly threatened a neighbor, shot into the air multiple times. When The SWAT team surrounded the home, he barricaded himself inside and opened fire on the armored vehicles. At some point, officers got into the home and shot and killed him.
2024-09-26	Emmanuel Lee Vestal	White	Pomona Park, Florida	
2024-09-26	Charles Verdin (58)	Unknown	Hahnville, Louisiana	St. Charles Parish Sheriff's Office responded to a report of a man pointing a realistic-looking AR-15 at people. Upon arrival, Verdin reportedly pointed it at the deputies before being fatally shot. Later police found that the weapon he held was an airsoft gun.
2024-09-26	Seantrell Murdock (29)	Black	Belle Plaine, Minnesota	Saint Paul Police Department identified a homicide suspect's vehicle and got a picture of the driver which led them to Belle Plaine. When the suspect got out a house with a gun, two officers shot and killed him. According to Police, Murdock shot and killed a woman in Saint Paul on September 25.
2024-09-25	Gregory Maxwell (37)	Unknown	St. Louis, Missouri	In the Cheltenham neighborhood, a man entered a building with puppy and begin roaming the business, sitting in chairs and desks. When SLMPD arrived at the building and encountered the man, the man reportedly pulled out a knife and begin stabbing the puppy and himself. Afterwards an officer shot the man. The man was later pronounced dead at a hospital. The puppy was rushed to the Humane Society, and it is said that the puppy will survive.
2024-09-24	Donn Moore (22)	Unknown	Yuba County, California	Yuba County Sheriff's Department attempted to conduct a traffic stop on a vehicle but the suspect fled. After a pursuit, the suspect reportedly fired at the deputies, causing them to return fire, killing him.
2024-09-24	Jesus Garcia (44)	Hispanic	Fontana, California	A man was shot and killed after he attacked Fontana Police officers with a pipe. On cellphone video recorded by witness shows the man being beaten by the officers after being shot.
2024-09-23	Brant David Nickell (58)	Unknown	Fort Worth, Texas	
2024-09-23	Terralyn Whalin (34)	White	Lawton, Oklahoma	While LPD officers were serving a felony arrest warrant, they encountered Whalin with a gun. They ordered her to drop it but she did not comply. Officers then fatally shot her.
2024-09-22	Nelson Reyes (37)	Unknown	Charlotte, North Carolina	During a traffic stop, Charlotte-Mecklenburg Police Department officers exchanged gunfire with a suspect. The suspect shot and injured an officer and was shot during the shootout.
2024-09-22	Ronald Parrish (68)	White	Muscle Shoals, Alabama	Parrish lunged toward Muscle Shoals Police Department officers with a knife and was shot.
2024-09-22	Stephanie Coon/Gracen Coon (33)	White	Santa Fe, New Mexico	Santa Fe Police received a report that a suspect was threatening a person inside a home. Upon arrival, Coon approached the officers with a weapon and was shot.
2024-09-22	unidentified male	Unknown	Houston, Texas	2 HPD officers were dispatched to an unrelated call and heard gunshots nearby. Then they went to ensure it was safe. Upon arrival, they saw a car with a broken window and a man. When officers attempted to ask some questions, the man opened fire. Officers then returned fire, killing the man. Another man's body was found near the scene.
2024-09-21	Melvin Omar Chavez-Paz (31)	Hispanic	Silver Spring, Maryland	
2024-09-21	Richard Green	Black	Orlando, Florida	
2024-09-21	James Michael Spaugh (34)	Unknown	Yuma, Arizona	
2024-09-20	Alicia Mayorga-Rangel (32)	Hispanic	Dalton, Georgia	
2024-09-20	Jeremy L Bennett (37)	Unknown	Massapequa, New York	Police in Jamaica, Queens attempted to pull a man over, but the driver fled. Following a chase that ended in Massapequa, police shot and killed the man. Seven police officers and a civilian were injured during the chase.
2024-09-20	Ronald Allen Troskoski (31)	Unknown	Christiansburg, Virginia	Montgomery County Sheriff's deputies responded to a call about a suspicious male. Upon arrival, they saw a man with a knife and ran. Christiansburg Police with the deputies later located the man who ran into the woods. At some point, he pointed a weapon at the police before being fatally shot.
2024-09-20	Kyle Wilson Norris (42)	Unknown	Las Vegas, Nevada	Norris was shot and killed by a Metropolitan Police Department officer after he approached the officer with an aluminum baseball bat. Less lethal device was not effective.
2024-09-19	Polina Wright (25)	White	Ocala, Florida	A Marion County Sheriff's deputy was charged with manslaughter after shooting Wright, his girlfriend, at a home. The deputy told a 911 operator he and Wright were cleaning and dry firing a handgun and rifle when he accidentally shot Wright with the rifle.
2024-09-19	Desire Pool (41)	Black	Houston, Texas	Pool, a woman who was crossing the street with three of her children, was struck and killed by a HPD cruiser which was transporting a suspect.
2024-09-19	Roberto Gonzalez (34)	Hispanic	San Antonio, Texas	San Antonio Officers conducted a traffic stop on Gonzalez, who was wanted on active robbery warrant. He eventually fled on foot and pointed a gun at the officers before being fatally shot.
2024-09-19	Jebrell Conley (36)	Black	West Haven, Connecticut	A State Trooper and two New Haven Police officers approached Conley at a car wash to serve an arrest warrant. Conley allegedly pulled a gun on the officers, leading them to shoot and kill him.
2024-09-19	Kevin Mullins (54)	White	Whitesburg, Kentucky	The sheriff of Letcher County was charged with murder after he allegedly shot and killed Mullins, a district court judge, following an argument inside the judge's chamber at the county courthouse.
2024-09-18	Elvin Ray Fox (65)	White	Bridgeport, Texas	Wise County Sheriff's Office shot and killed Fox, who was waving a large skinning knife, after they responded to a family disturbance call.
2024-09-18	Ali Ali (28)	Middle Eastern	Highland Mills, New York	Ali was being pursued by New York State Police in a stolen vehicle. At some point, Ali crashed the vehicle on the New York State Thruway and ran into a wooded area. Ali was then shot by a Trooper during what media sources call a "confrontation".
2024-09-17	Steven Fifer (55)	Black	Marrero, Louisiana	Two Jefferson Parish Sheriff's Office deputies shot Fifer after he reportedly exited a house after an hours-long standoff and raised a firearm. Fifer was wanted on multiple charges stemming from New Orleans.
2024-09-16	Joshua Arnold (41)	White	Russell Springs, Kentucky	KSP troopers with other units were searching for Joshua Arnold who fled on foot. After they located Arnold, gunfire was exchanged. Deputy Josh Phipps and Arnold were both killed during the shootout.
2024-09-16	Tremayne French (26)	Black	Memphis, Tennessee	Early in the day, French and other man, Tadarius Nichols reportedly carjacked a woman for her Dodge Charger at gunpoint. Later in the day, French and Nichols were spotted by Memphis Police. When the police attempted to pull over the pair, they took off. Eventually, the pair got out the car and ran. Two officers ran after both French and Nichols. French reportedly shot at the officers during the chase and was then fatally shot.
2024-09-16	Sean Griffin (37)	Black	Los Angeles, California	LAPD were sent to investigate an assault with a deadly weapon. Upon arrival, they found a person dead in a vehicle. At some point, a suspect pointed a gun at them, then they fatally shot him in the parking structure. It is unclear if the suspect fired shots.
2024-09-16	Samuel Sterling Caston (59)	Unknown	Fort Wayne, Indiana	A man told FWPD that Caston hit his wife and then pulled a gun on her. When officers found him, he crashed into a police car then drove off. After a pursuit, he shot at the police before being fatally shot by two officers.
2024-09-16	Sydney Wilson (33)	Black	Reston, Virginia	Officers responded to a welfare check at Wilson's apartment and shot after she slashed at police with a knife, striking one officer in the head.
2024-09-16	Mark Miller (62)	White	Olive Branch, Mississippi	
2024-09-16	Joshua Dean Green (27)	White	Des Moines, Iowa	DMPD patrol officers attempted to conduct a traffic stop on a vehicle, the suspect fled. A pursuit ensued and ended after the suspect crashed his vehicle. When they tried to arrest him, he shot two officers before being fatally shot. Both officers are hospitalized and expected to survive.
2024-09-15	Rodney Huffman (58)	Unknown	Indianapolis, Indiana	Huffman, a pedestrian, was struck by an IMPD cruiser. He died at a hospital 6 days later.
2024-09-15	Gabriel Renteria (35)	Native American	Sumner, Washington	A man in crisis was on the train track overpass and refused to leave. According to Sumner police, after multiple strategies including negotiations and less than lethal tactics, the incident led to officer-involved shooting.
2024-09-15	unidentified male	Unknown	Snohomish County, Washington	
2024-09-15	Gabriel Diaz (55)	Hispanic	East Greenville, Pennsylvania	A man barricaded in the basement and threatened to harm law enforcement officers. When East Greenville Police breached the basement door, the man who was armed with a machete and hatchet charged at them. Officers then shot and killed him. Stun gun was ineffective.
2024-09-14	unidentified female (28)	Unknown	Houston, Texas	
2024-09-14	David Tobias Tyler (46)	Unknown	Linn County, Oregon	Police responded to reports of a hit-and-run near Scio. A SWAT team located the suspect, Tyler, on a bridge in Linn County and shot him after he allegedly shot at them.
2024-09-14	Joseph Garcia (22)	Hispanic	San Antonio, Texas	In Downtown San Antonio, a man wanted on multiple warrants was fatally shot by San Antonio Police officers in a parking lot after the man reportedly reached into a backpack while shouting threats.
2024-09-14	Chevis Whalen (31)	White	Denham Springs, Louisiana	Whalen reportedly shooting from the second floor of Motel 6. When Denham Springs Police officers arrived to the hotel, Whalen was shot after reportedly exchanged gunfire with the officers.
2024-09-13	Enrique Delgado-Garcia (25)	Hispanic	New Braintree, Massachusetts	Massachusetts state recruit Delgado-Garcia is dead after suffering severe brain trauma and blunt force injuries during an unauthorized boxing training exercise at the academy. In February 2026, four members of the academy's defensive tactics unit: Lt. Jennifer Penton, Trooper Edwin Rodriguez, Trooper David Montanez, and Trooper Casey LaMonte were charged with involuntary manslaughter and other charges. Penton was also charged with perjury. They all plead not guilty.
2024-09-13	Stuart Chad Mast (48)	White	Ashe County, North Carolina	
2024-09-13	unidentified male	Unknown	Orange County, Florida	
2024-09-13	Vilmond Jean Baptiste (38)	Black	New York City, New York	Police entered an apartment to search for Jean Baptiste, suspected in three stabbing deaths in July and August. Officers encountered Jean Baptiste sitting in a bathtub and shot him after he allegedly lunged at them with a knife.
2024-09-13	Ricardo Infante Jr. (31)	Hispanic	Andrews, Texas	Andrews County Sheriff's Office were serving a felony arrest warrant. When they attempted to take Infante Jr. into custody, a fight ensued. Infante Jr. stabbed two officers before being fatally shot. Both injured officers are in stable condition.
2024-09-13	Shawn Dewayne Hammond (45)	Black	Houston, Texas	Houston Police were dispatched for calls of disturbance. Upon arrival, they were flagged down by a female who appeared to be assaulted. They later contacted her boyfriend inside of an apartment. The man reportedly approached the officers with a gun before being shot.
2024-09-12	unidentified male	White	Spring, Texas	A caller reported that a white male was trespassing and refusing to leave. Montgomery County Sheriff's Office arrived and a struggle ensued. Despite deploying tasers, the suspect was able to grab a gun in his property and fled. During the foot chase, the suspect suddenly turn toward deputies and was shot.
2024-09-12	Jake R. Carruth (44)	Unknown	Tempe, Arizona	Tempe Police received a report of a disturbing suspect and learned that the suspect pointed a gun at the caller. They contacted the suspect. The suspect came out of his apartment with a gun and was shot after pointing it at them.
2024-09-11	unidentified male	Unknown	Tyler, Texas	A pursuit of a stolen truck started in Forney. During the chase, regarding of the driver's reckless behavior that posed a threat to motorists and bystanders, a THP trooper opened fire, ending the pursuit. The driver later died in a hospital.
2024-09-11	James A. Dellea (48)	White	Malta, New York	
2024-09-10	David M. Peter (36)	White	Richwoods, Missouri	
2024-09-10	Shane Linderman (50)	Unknown	Youngstown, Ohio	At a Dollar Tree, a man stabbed himself and a woman. The man was then fatally shot by a police officer who responded to the scene. What prompted the police officer to shoot the man is unknown.
2024-09-10	Franklin Earl Miller (49)	White	Austin, Texas	At around 11 P.M. a person called 9–11 to report that a man was attempting to break into a convenience store nail salon with a gun in his hand in the North Austin neighborhood. When Austin Police officers encountered the man, they tried to de-escalate the situation by asking him to drop his gun and put his hands up multiple times. This was ineffective, and shortly after, five officers shot the man.
2024-09-10	unidentified male	Unknown	Miami, Florida	Three Miami Police Officers fatally shot a man, who was wanted for robbery, outside an apartment complex in the Liberty City neighborhood. The reason for the killing is unknown.
2024-09-10	Lamine Mahmoudi (34)	Unknown	Columbus, Ohio	
2024-09-09	Jeanette Benthall (85)	Black	Largo, Maryland	
2024-09-09	Jared Gottula (41)	Unknown	Thermopolis, Wyoming	
2024-09-09	unidentified male	Unknown	Mountain Home, Idaho	
2024-09-09	Travis Yeart Pratt (35)	White	Littcarr, Kentucky	Pratt, who was possibly armed with a knife barricaded himself in a room of a home. According to KSP, officers made their way into the room and Pratt reportedly presented a deadly threat before being shot. Tasers were deployed but they weren't effective.
2024-09-08	Rhyker Earl (26)	White	DeMotte, Indiana	Earl's Grandma called 911 to report that Earl was suffering from a seizure at his home. This prompted a response from the Jasper County Sheriff Office and Keener Township EMS. At the scene, Earl seemed to be in a postictal state and was allegedly trying to recuperate from the seizure. As Earl was trying to put on shorts to go to a hospital, he allegedly bumped into either a deputy or paramedic. This allegedly caused the deputies to become hostile. The deputies then handcuffed Earl facedown to the floor. Multiple deputies then got on top Earl's body while EMTS administered sedatives. After a while, Earl's body went limp. Earl was then taken to the hospital, where he died on September 10th.
2024-09-08	Roberto Rivera (50)	Hispanic	San Jose, California	Officers arrived at a restaurant to a call about a man shooting a gun randomly and shooting a man. Rivera allegedly pointed the gun at the officers and was fatally shot.
2024-09-08	Lavon Green (36)	Hispanic	Victorville, California	
2024-09-07	Aaron Allen Patterson (41)	Unknown	Clarkesville, Georgia	Police were dispatched to a welfare check. Upon arrival, a Demorest Police Officer saw Patterson with a gun and ran from them. After they located him, he turned toward the officers with a rifle and was shot. He died 13 days later.
2024-09-07	Gary Lee McCartney (62)	White	Hughesville, Pennsylvania	
2024-09-07	Carlos Daniel Hinojosa Hernandez (23)	Hispanic	Weslaco, Texas	
2024-09-07	Domingo "Pop" Chun (29)	Hispanic	Dallas, Texas	A suspect who attempted to break into an apartment was shot and killed by Dallas Police after he drew a fake gun.
2024-09-07	Ivan Felton (20)	Unknown	Newton County, Georgia	Felton was shooting at a Salem Glen Apartments resident. An off-duty Rockdale County deputy witnessed the shooting and fatally shot Felton.
2024-09-07	Victor Anthony De Santiago (32)	Hispanic	Westminster, Colorado	While Colorado State Patrol trooper Tye Simcox was doing paperwork in his vehicle, a suspect in a pickup truck fired multiple rounds at his patrol car. The suspect then pulled over and kept shooting at him with a handgun. Simcox then returned fired fire, killing the suspect. Simcox sustained non-life-threatening injuries. Officials believed that he was targeted by the shooter.
2024-09-07	Rigoberto Sanchez (27)	Hispanic	Lafayette, Louisiana	A Lafayette Police Department officer responded to a report of a residential robbery. As the officer located and approached a suspect vehicle, the vehicle accelerated toward the officer. The officer fired shots, killing the suspect.
2024-09-06	Rickey Reed (46)	Black	Covington, Tennessee	
2024-09-06	Ryan D. Phillips (33)	Black	Rock Hill, Missouri	Phillips and Evens were killed after their vehicle rolled over during a vehicle pursuit.
2024-09-06	Delisha D. Evans (30)	Black	Rock Hill, Missouri	Phillips and Evens were killed after their vehicle rolled over during a vehicle pursuit.
2024-09-06	John Edward McCloud (58)	Black	Fort Wayne, Indiana	Shortly before 2 AM, someone called 911 to report of a burglary in progress at a home. When Fort Wayne Police officers arrived at the house, they went inside and encountered the unidentified male. For reasons unknown, the man was shot by an officer. Shortly after, the man was pronounced dead at the scene.
2024-09-05	Walter O. Anderson (38)	White	Lincoln City, Oregon	Police were searching for Anderson after he allegedly fired shots at them from a converted school bus. They located him in a home and a stand-off ensued. At some point, the house caught fire, and police shot Anderson after he allegedly climbed onto the roof with a rifle.
2024-09-04	Carrington James (19)	Black	Springfield, Illinois	James, who was suspected of being the suspect in a shooting earlier in the evening, was being questioned by four police officers while seated on the passenger side of a vehicle stopped in the drive-thru of a restaurant. After being removed from the vehicle by Officer Jesse Schmillen, James ran from the officers and towards a nearby street. While running, James allegedly reached into his shorts and fired at the officers. Schmillen then fired multiple shots at James, striking him. James was later pronounced dead at a hospital. Three months later on December 20, Sangamon County State's Attorney John Milhiser announced that no charges would by filed in relation to James's death. On the same day, bodycam footage of the killing was released.
2024-09-04	Jesus Rafael Contreras (41)	Hispanic	Santa Fe, New Mexico	
2024-09-04	Karl Komorowski (37)	White	Glendale, Arizona	
2024-09-04	Coby Granger (39)	White	Orangefield, Texas	
2024-09-03	Tyler Jacob Ben (29)	White	Colorado Springs, Colorado	Colorado Springs Police Department officers found a stolen vehicle in a Walmart parking lot and learned that a couple was using it. Officers approached the couple and the man pulled out a handgun. An officer fired at least one round, fatally striking him.
2024-09-03	Jeremy Antoine Miller (37)	Unknown	Roswell, Georgia	
2024-09-03	Nicholas Kirby (43)	White	Bismarck, North Dakota	
2024-09-02	Amari Justin Young (22)	Black	Auburn, Alabama	Police shot and killed Young, suspected of an armed break-in at an apartment building.
2024-09-02	Richard Grande (55)	White	Glenwood Springs, Colorado	
2024-09-01	Andrew Roselius (37)	White	Sheldon, Illinois	Iroquois County Sheriff's Office deputies were chasing an armed suspect and Newton County Sheriff's Department engaged with the pursuit as the suspect crossed the state line into Indiana. The suspect then crossed back to Illinois and crashed the vehicle. A shootout occurred between the suspect and the police which left the suspect dead and an officer critically injured. The wounded officer, Cpl. Brandon Schreiber, did not survive his injuries and became an organ donor.
2024-09-01	Joshua Ramirez (31)	Hispanic	Idaho Falls, Idaho	A Bonneville County Sheriff's deputy attempted to conduct a traffic stop on a vehicle which almost struck him head on, but the vehicle did not stop. After a pursuit, deputies surrounded the vehicle and fatally shot the driver, later identified as Joshua Ramirez. It is unclear what led to the shooting.
2024-09-01	Jesse Martinez (34)	Hispanic	DeSoto, Texas	DeSoto Police responded after someone reported that a male with a child and two women were randomly knocking on doors and trespassing just after 4 a.m.. When they encountered the suspect, the suspect reportedly held a child and armed with a gun. At some point, the suspect fled with the child and were found about 30 minutes later. One officer discharged his rifle, killing him.
2024-09-01	Justin Robinson (26)	Black	Washington D.C.	In the early morning hours, DC Police received a call about a car crash at the McDonald's restaurant in Southeastern DC. When they arrived to the scene, Robinson, who was the driver of the crashed car, was said to have been armed with a gun. As Robinson was being given commands to drop the gun, Robinson allegedly grabbed an officer's service weapon. Two DC police officers then shot Robinson. Robinson died at the scene. Robinson was a member of "Cure the Streets", a violence interruption program.

== See also ==
- Death in custody § United States
- Henry A. Wallace Police Crime Public Database
- List of cases of police brutality
- List of countries with annual rates and counts for killings by law enforcement officers
- List of law enforcement officers killed in the line of duty in the United States
- List of law enforcement officers convicted for an on-duty killing in the United States
- List of shootings by US immigration agents
- List of police reforms related to the George Floyd protests
- List of unarmed African Americans killed by law enforcement officers in the United States
- Lists of killings by law enforcement officers
- Police brutality in the United States
- Police misconduct § United States
- Police riot § United States
- Police use of deadly force in the United States
