= Hollybush, Kentucky =

Unincorporated community in Kentucky, United States

- Unincorporated community
- Location within Kentucky Location within the United States
- Coordinates: 37°20′15″N 82°51′7″W
- Country: United States
- State: Kentucky
- County: Knott
- Elevation: 978 ft (298 m)
- Time zone: UTC-5 (Eastern (EST))
  - Summer (DST): UTC-4 (EDT)
- GNIS feature ID: 508267

Hollybush is an unincorporated community within Knott County, Kentucky, United States.
