= James Still (poet) =

American poet

- Born: July 16, 1906; LaFayette, Alabama, USA
- Died: April 28, 2001 (aged 94); Hazard, Kentucky, USA
- Education: Lincoln Memorial University; Vanderbilt University; University of Illinois
- Occupations: Poet; novelist; folklorist
- Relatives: J. Alex Still (father); Lonie (Lindsey) Still (mother)
- Writing career
- Notable work: River of Earth
- Website: faculty.colostate-pueblo.edu/sandy.hudock/jshome.html

James Still (July 16, 1906 – April 28, 2001) was an American poet, novelist and folklorist. He lived most of his life in a log house along the Dead Mare Branch of Little Carr Creek, Knott County, Kentucky. He was best known for the novel River of Earth, which depicted the struggles of coal mining in eastern Kentucky.

== Life ==
=== Early life ===
Lonie, Still's mother was sixteen when she moved to Alabama due to a tornado destroying the family home. His father, J. Alex Still, was a horse doctor with no formal training. James Still was born July 16, 1906, near Lafayette, Alabama. Still was considered a quiet child but a hard worker. He along with his nine siblings worked the family farm. They farmed cotton, sugar cane, soybeans and corn. At the age of seven, Still began grade school. He found greater interest not in the school text books but at home where there was an edition of the Cyclopedia of Universal Knowledge. He became enriched with philosophy, physics and the great British poets – Shakespeare and Keats.

=== Education ===
After graduating from high school, Still attended Lincoln Memorial University of Harrogate, Tennessee. He worked at the rock quarry in the afternoons and as a library janitor in the evenings. He would often sleep at the library after spending the night reading works of literature. Upon graduation in 1929, he began graduate work at Vanderbilt University in Nashville, Tennessee. While at Vanderbilt, he became involved in a controversial miner strike in Wilder, Tennessee. The miners were starving due to holding the picket line; Still delivered a truckload of food and clothing for the miners. Still graduated with an MA in English in 1930. He later completed additional graduate work at the University of Illinois.

=== Career ===
Still tried various professions including the Civil Service Corps, Bible salesman, and even a stint picking cotton in Texas. His friend Don West—a poet and civil rights activist, among other things—offered Still a job organizing recreation programs for a Bible school in Knott County, Kentucky. Still accepted the position but soon became a volunteer librarian at the Hindman Settlement School. Knott County would become Still's lifelong home, though for many years he was the creative force behind the Morehead Writers' Workshop at nearby Morehead State University, where he taught literature during the 1960s.

James Still served as a sergeant in the U.S. Army in World War II and was stationed in Egypt in 1944.

=== Literature ===
Still moved into a two-story log house once occupied by a crafter of dulcimers, Jethro Amburgey. He would remain here till his death. Here, he began writing his masterpiece, River of Earth. It was published February 5, 1940. River of Earth is a discussion of change in Appalachia, depicted as the struggles of a family trying to survive by either subsisting off the land or entering the coal mines of the Cumberland Plateau in the reaches of eastern Kentucky. This tension is depicted in the tension between Brack and Alpha Baldridge. Alpha Baldridge longs for settled solidity. "Forever I've wanted to set us down in a lone spot, a place certain and enduring, with room to swing arm and elbow, . . . . So many places we've lived—the far side of one mine camp and next the slag pile of another. I'm longing to set me down shorely and raise my chaps proper (50–51)." Conversely, her husband Brack is committed to the mines and answers her as the family provider: "It was never meant for a body to be full content on the face of this earth. Against my wont it is to be treading the camps, but its bread I'm hunting, regular bread with a mite of grease on it. To make and provide, it's the only trade I know, and I work willing (51)." His version of stability is perhaps more transitory than hers. She longs to see things grow of a season, whether gardens or children; he looks for the high-return of mine work, despite the dangers (which are not major factors in the book) and the irregularity of the work. She is willing to trade the sentence of living from hand to mouth through the year for the security of a personal place; he, to endure famine for the short seasons of feasting that mine work allows. The perspectives of both characters represent the dead-end choices of Appalachians who chose to remain in the hills.

Still received the Southern Author's Award shortly after publication, which he shared with Thomas Wolfe for Wolfe's work You Can't Go Home Again. Still went on to publish a few collections of poetry and short stories, a juvenile novel and a compilation of Appalachian local color he collected over the years. The children's book "Jack and the Wonderbeans" was adapted for the stage by the Lexington Children's Theatre in 1992. Still participated in one performance, reading a portion of the book to open the show. He died April 28, 2001, at the age of 94.

== Legacy ==
Wolfpen, the log house, was listed on the National Register of Historic Places in 2014.

== Bibliography ==
- Hounds on the Mountain (1937)
- River of Earth (1940)
- On Troublesome Creek (1941)
- Way Down Yonder on Troublesome Creek: Appalachian Riddles and Rusties (1974)
- The Wolfpen Rusties: Appalachian Riddles and Gee-Haw Whimmy-Diddles (1975)
- Pattern of a Man (1976)
- Jack and the Wonder Beans (1977)
- Sporty Creek: A Novel about an Appalachian Boyhood (1977)
- The Run for the Elbertas (1980)
- The Wolfpen Poems (1986)
- From the Mountain, From the Valley: New and Collected Poems (2001)
- Chinaberry (2011)
- The Hills Remember: The Complete Short Stories of James Still (2012)
