= Topmost, Kentucky =

Unincorporated community in Kentucky, United States

Tapeta
- Unincorporated community
- Location within Kentucky Location within the United States
- Coordinates: 37°21′31″N 82°47′17″W
- Country: United States
- State: Kentucky
- County: Knott
- Elevation: 823 ft (251 m)
- Time zone: UTC-5 (Eastern (EST))
  - Summer (DST): UTC-4 (EDT)
- ZIP codes: 41862
- GNIS feature ID: 505361

Topmost is an unincorporated community within Knott County, Kentucky, United States.

A 1981 coal mine explosion in Topmost killed eight miners.
