= Redfox, Knott County, Kentucky =

Unincorporated community in Kentucky, United States

- Unincorporated community
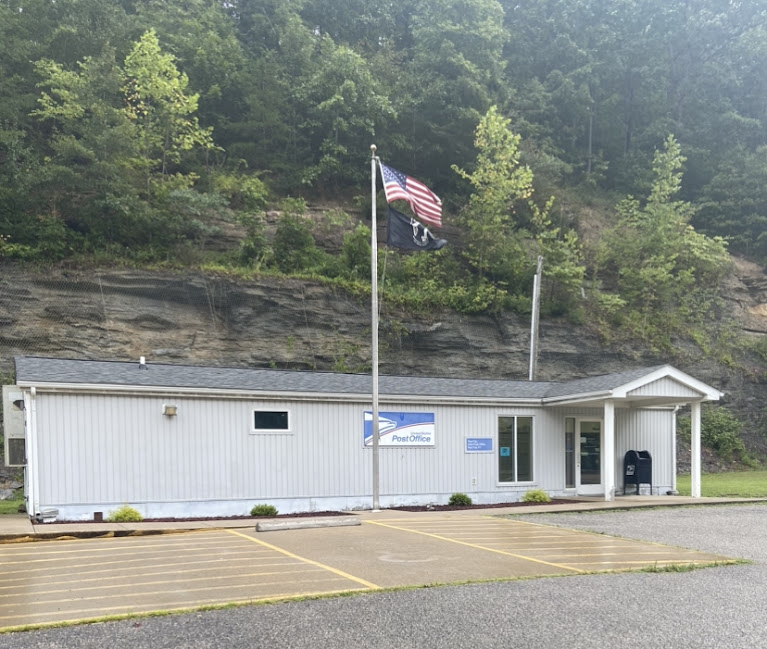
- Redfox post office located on Kentucky Route 15

- Location within the state of Kentucky Redfox (the United States)
- Coordinates: 37°12′53″N 82°56′38″W
- Country: United States
- State: Kentucky
- County: Knott
- Elevation: 1,142 ft (348 m)
- Time zone: UTC-5 (Eastern (EST))
  - Summer (DST): UTC-4 (EST)
- ZIP codes: 41847
- GNIS feature ID: 508914

Redfox is an unincorporated community located in Knott County, Kentucky, United States.
