= Raven, Kentucky =

Unincorporated community in Kentucky, United States

- Unincorporated community
- Location within the state of Kentucky Raven (the United States)
- Coordinates: 37°24′10″N 82°48′23″W
- Country: United States
- State: Kentucky
- County: Knott
- Elevation: 758 ft (231 m)
- Time zone: UTC-5 (Eastern (EST))
  - Summer (DST): UTC-4 (EDT)
- ZIP code: 41861
- Area code: 606
- GNIS feature ID: 508904

Raven is an unincorporated community within Knott County, Kentucky, United States. Its post office is closed.
