= Anco, Kentucky =

Unincorporated community in Kentucky, United States

- Unincorporated community
- Location within Kentucky Location within the United States
- Coordinates: 37°14′42″N 83°03′35″W
- Country: United States
- State: Kentucky
- County: Knott
- Elevation: 1,204 ft (367 m)
- Time zone: UTC-5 (Eastern (EST))
  - Summer (DST): UTC-4 (EDT)
- Area code: 606
- GNIS feature ID: 507395

Anco is an unincorporated community in Knott County, Kentucky, United States. Anco is 7 miles (11 km) south-southwest of Hindman.
