= Irishmans, Kentucky =

Unincorporated community in Kentucky, United States

- Unincorporated community
- Location within Kentucky Location within the United States
- Coordinates: 37°14′42″N 82°59′44″W
- Country: United States
- State: Kentucky
- County: Knott
- Elevation: 1,079 ft (329 m)
- Time zone: UTC-5 (Eastern (EST))
  - Summer (DST): UTC-4 (EDT)
- GNIS feature ID: 2120783

Irishmans is an unincorporated community within Knott County, Kentucky, United States.
