= Hindman Historic District =

Historic district in Kentucky, United States

- U.S. National Register of Historic Places
- U.S. Historic district
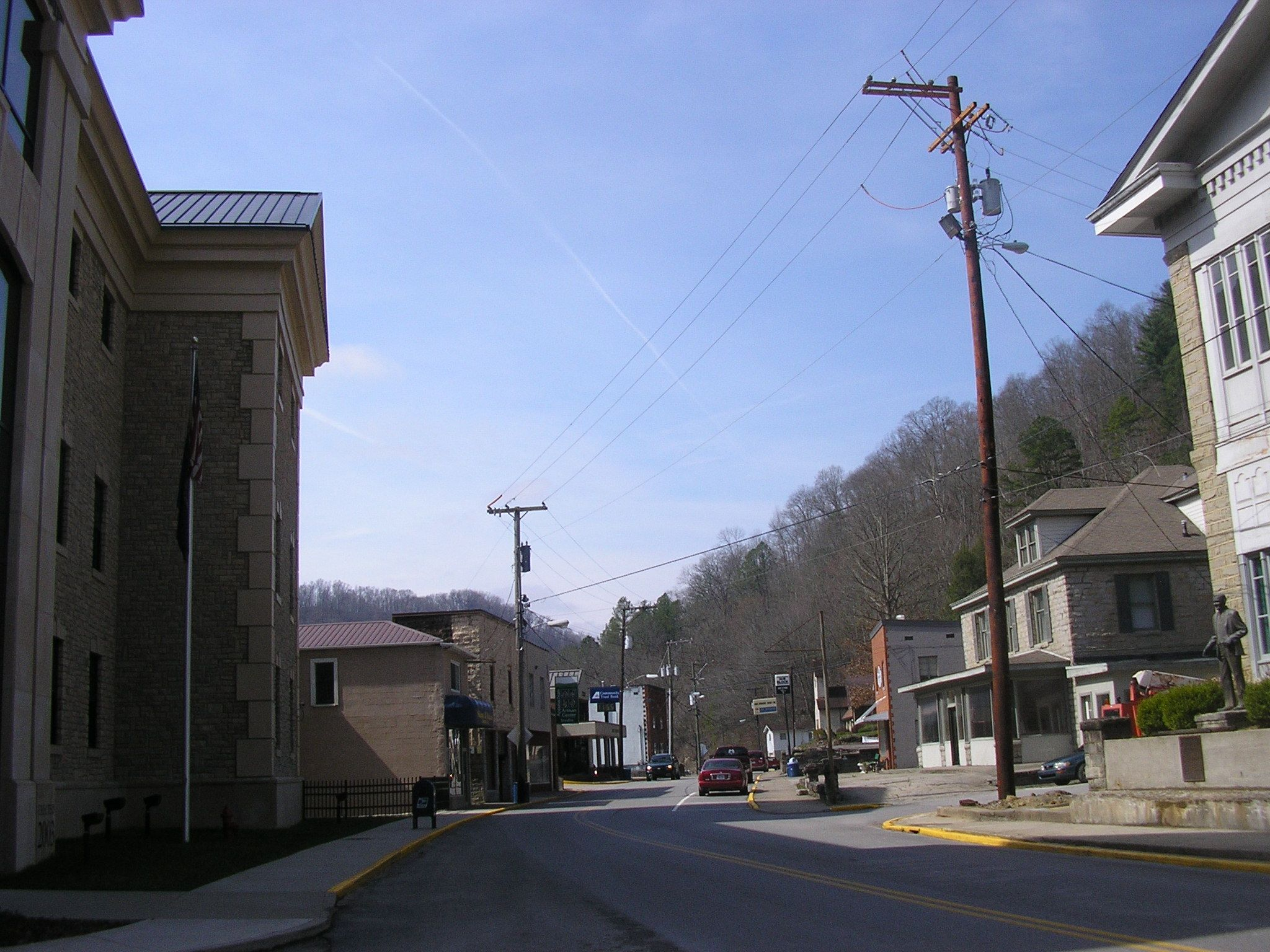

- Location within Kentucky Location within the United States
- Location: Hindman, Kentucky
- Coordinates: 37°20′07″N 82°58′52″W
- Area: 25 acres (10 ha)
- NRHP reference No.: 13000112
- Added to NRHP: March 27, 2013

The Hindman Historic District is a historic district along Main St. and Kentucky Route 160 in Hindman, Kentucky. It was listed on the National Register of Historic Places in 2013.

It is an irregularly-shaped district. It mainly includes two-story houses and commercial buildings built from 1903 to 1960. It includes the Bolen Building (1942) and the Hindman Ben Franklin (1913), two buildings which were listed separately on the National Register in 2007 and are both now part of the Appalachian Artisan Center.
