= Cordia School =

Public school in Knott County, Kentucky

Coordinates: 37.2765°N 83.1097°W

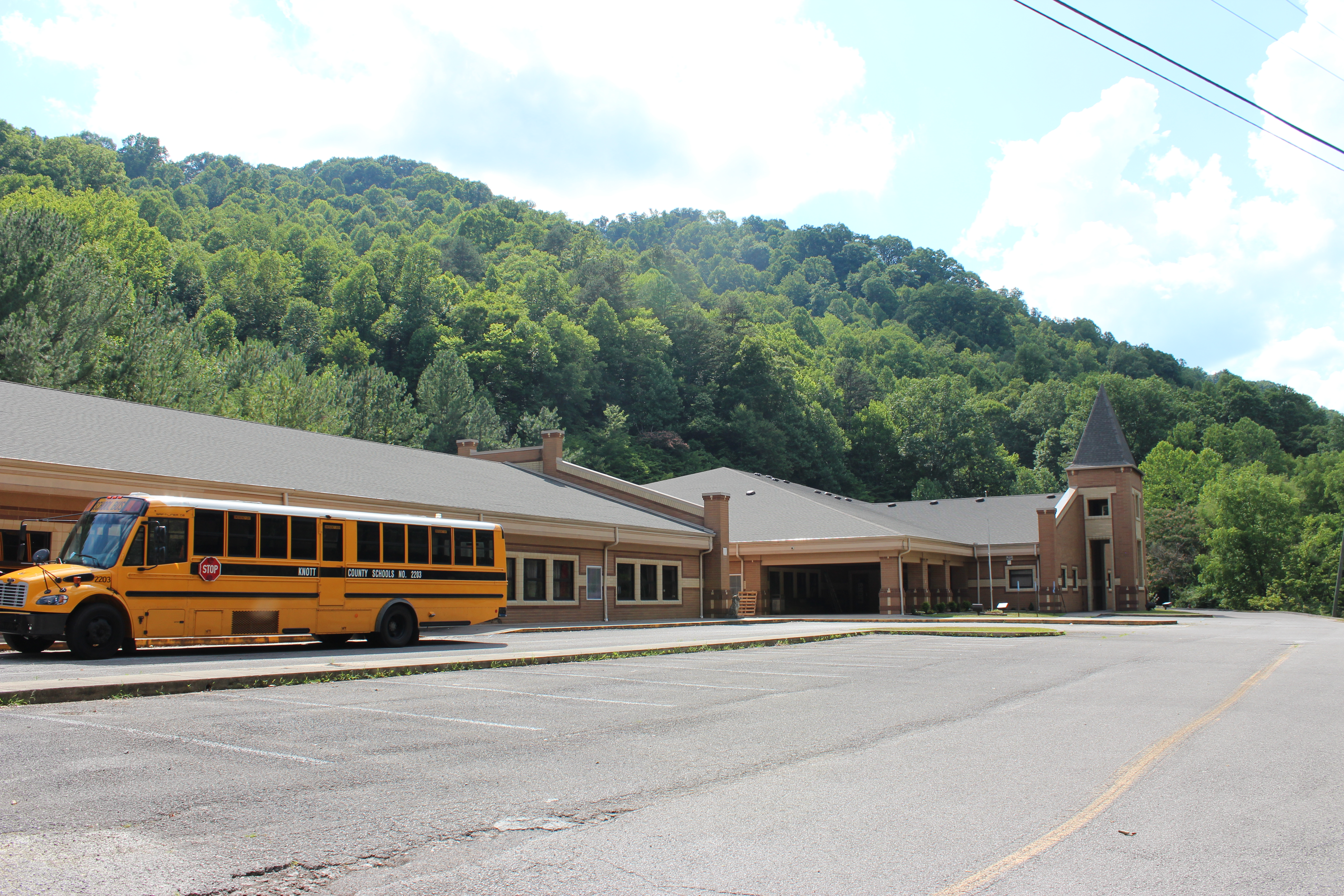
- Cordia School, circa 2024
- 6050 Lotts Creek Road; Hazard, Kentucky

Information
- School type: Public
- Established: c. 1933
- School district: Knott County School District
- Superintendent: Gregory Conn
- Principal: Deanna Wicker
- Staff: 13
- Grades: Prekindergarten-12
- Enrollment: 171
- Colors: Black and gold
- Nickname: Lions
- Website: https://www.knott.k12.ky.us/cordiaschool_home.aspx

Cordia School is one of two high schools located in Knott County, Kentucky. It serves students from Prekindergarten to 12th grade.

== History ==
The school was established by Alice Slone from Caney Creek, Kentucky. Slone was sent to Cleveland, Ohio, by Alice Lloyd to receive her education. Slone returned to Kentucky to teach, and established the school in 1933.

In early 2018, Kentucky Education Commissioner Stephen Pruitt deemed the school unsafe, and a health and safety inspection revealed issues, such as animal feces in the building, and structural cracks. Pruitt said that students and teachers must leave the building. Kentucky Department of Education officials came to a conclusion that the school shall not be occupied by the Knott County School District after February 2, 2018.

In late 2018, a ruling came down in favor of Cordia School. The school would stay open and continue to serve students.

== Sports ==
Cordia is home to the Cordia Lions. In 2011, it hired Rodrick Rhodes to be its basketball coach. When Rhodes was hired, the Kentucky High School Athletic Association banned certain students from playing, claiming that the students were being paid by Rhodes and Cordia to play for them, as they could think of no other reason students from places such New York, Canada, and Mali would come to Eastern Kentucky to play basketball at Cordia.

== Rankings ==
The school is ranked 120th in Kentucky. The total minority enrollment is 2% and 85% of the students are economically disadvantaged. It is ranked No. 8,521 in the national rankings. 53% of students are male, and 47% of students are female.
