= Hiram and Art Stamper House =

Historic house in Kentucky, United States

- U.S. National Register of Historic Places
- Location within Kentucky Location within the United States
- Location: 864 Stamper Branch Rd., about 3.5 miles (5.6 km) northeast of Hindman, Kentucky
- Coordinates: 37°22′38″N 82°57′37″W
- Area: 85.11 acres (34.44 ha)
- Architectural style: Saddlebag architecture
- NRHP reference No.: 13001053
- Added to NRHP: January 8, 2014

The Hiram and Art Stamper House, at 864 Stamper Branch Rd., is a historic house near Hindman, Kentucky. It was listed on the National Register of Historic Places in 2014.

It was a home of Kentucky Bluegrass musicians Hiram Stamper and Art Stamper.

The house on the property was a two-room log house in a saddlebag plan in 1931 when the family moved in, around 1931.

Art Stamper died in 2005 at age 71.
