= Dema, Kentucky =

Unincorporated community in Kentucky, United States

- Unincorporated community
- Location within Kentucky Location within the United States
- Coordinates: 37°25′13″N 82°48′19″W
- Country: United States
- State: Kentucky
- County: Floyd, Knott
- Elevation: 774 ft (236 m)
- Time zone: UTC-5 (Eastern (EST))
  - Summer (DST): UTC-4 (EDT)
- ZIP code: 41859
- Area code: 606
- GNIS feature ID: 507842

Dema is an unincorporated community in Floyd and Knott counties in the U.S. state of Kentucky. The community is located on Kentucky Route 7 1.7 miles (2.7 km) south of Wayland. Dema has a post office with ZIP code 41845.
