= Hindman Ben Franklin =

- U.S. National Register of Historic Places
- U.S. Historic district – Contributing property
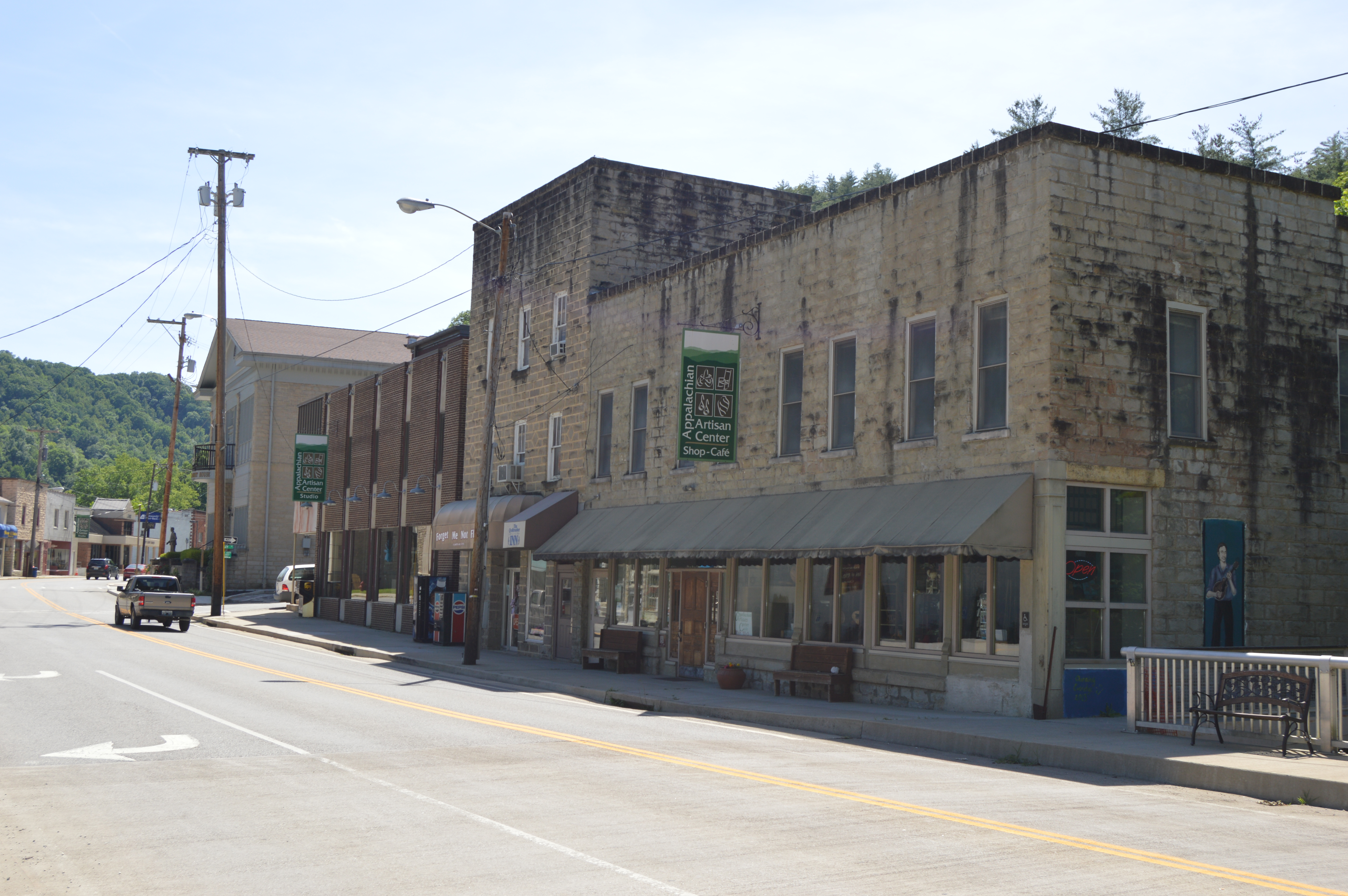

- Location within Kentucky Location within the United States
- Location: 16 W. Main St., Hindman, Kentucky
- Coordinates: 37°20′08″N 82°58′54″W
- Area: less than one acre
- Built: 1914
- Built by: Smith, Hillard
- Part of: Hindman Historic District (ID13000112)
- NRHP reference No.: 07000675

Significant dates
- Added to NRHP: August 23, 2007
- Designated CP: August 4, 2016

The Hindman Ben Franklin is a historic commercial building in Hindman, Kentucky, which formerly held a Ben Franklin five-and-dime-type store. It was listed on the National Register of Historic Places in 2007.

It is a "distinctive" building constructed of ashlar sandstone in 1913–14, originally to hold the Francis Smith and Company Department Store. It is also a contributing building in the Hindman Historic District, which was listed on the National Register in 2013.

By 2012 the building had been rehabilitated and was hosting the offices, gallery, and cafe of the Appalachian Artisan Center.
