= Indian Grave, Kentucky =

Unincorporated community in Kentucky, United States

- Unincorporated community
- Location within Kentucky Location within the United States
- Coordinates: 37°30′51″N 83°3′19″W
- Country: United States
- State: Kentucky
- County: Knott
- Elevation: 1,020 ft (310 m)
- Time zone: UTC-5 (Eastern (EST))
  - Summer (DST): UTC-4 (EDT)
- GNIS feature ID: 2120782

Indian Grave is an unincorporated community within Knott County, Kentucky, United States.
