= Mildred J. Hill =

Composer of the melody of "Happy Birthday to You"

- Born: Mildred Jane Hill; June 27, 1859; Louisville, Kentucky, U.S.
- Died: June 5, 1916 (aged 56); Chicago, Illinois, U.S.
- Resting place: Cave Hill Cemetery
- Occupations: Composer; teacher; musicologist
- Known for: Composing "Happy Birthday to You"
- Relatives: Patty Hill, Jessica Hill (sister)

Mildred Jane Hill (June 27, 1859 – June 5, 1916) was an American songwriter and musicologist, who composed the melody for "Good Morning to All", later used as the melody for "Happy Birthday to You".

== Biography ==
Mildred Jane Hill, born in Louisville, Kentucky, was the oldest of three sisters, Mildred, Patty, and Jessica. She learned music from her father, Calvin Cody, and Adolph Weidig.

It has been reported that Mildred Hill was a kindergarten and Sunday-school teacher, like her younger sister Patty. Prof. Robert Brauneis, after extensively researching the Hill family, has concluded that she was not a kindergarten teacher. She moved into music, teaching, composing, performing, and specializing in the study of Negro spirituals. Hill and her sister were honored at the Chicago World's Fair (1893) for their work in the progressive education program at the experimental kindergarten, the Louisville Experimental Kindergarten School.

She wrote about music using the pen name Johann Tonsor, and her 1892 article "Negro Music", suggesting that the existing body of black music would be the basis of a distinctive American musical style, influenced Dvořák in composing the New World Symphony.

Hill died in Chicago, Illinois, in 1916, long before her song became famous. She is buried with her sister in Cave Hill Cemetery in Louisville, Kentucky.

Mildred Hill's manuscripts and papers are held by the University of Louisville Music Library in Louisville, Kentucky.

== "Happy Birthday to You" ==
While teaching at the Louisville Experimental Kindergarten School, the Hill sisters wrote the song "Good Morning to All"; Mildred wrote the melody, and Patty the lyrics. The song was first published in 1893 in Song Stories for the Kindergarten as a greeting song for teachers to sing to their students. Song Stories for the Kindergarten had over 20 editions, and the words were translated into French, German, Italian, Spanish, Chinese, Japanese, and Swedish.

"Happy Birthday to You" first appeared in print in 1912 using the melody of "Good Morning to All" with different lyrics. Its popularity continued to grow through the 1930s, with no author identified for the new lyrics, nor credit given for the melody from "Good Morning to You". Based on 1935 copyright registrations by the Summy Company, and a series of court cases (which all settled out of court), the sisters became known as the authors of "Happy Birthday to You". In September 2015, a federal judge declared that "Happy Birthday to You" is in the public domain.

== Legacy ==
Hill and her sister were posthumously inducted into the Songwriters Hall of Fame on June 12, 1996.

== See also ==
- Kenwood Hill – Louisville neighborhood where Mildred and sister Patty occasionally resided
- List of people from the Louisville metropolitan area
