= Brit Taylor =

American singer-songwriter

- Born: Hindman, Kentucky
- Genres: Country
- Occupation: Songwriter
- Years active: 2020–present
- Website: brittaylormusic.com

Brit Taylor is a singer-songwriter and owns her own record label, Cut a Shine Records.

Taylor has worked alongside musicians including Mike and the Moonpies, Sturgill Simpson, David R. Ferguson, and her 2020 album, Real Me, opened as the highest-ranking debut album on the AMA/CDX Radio Chart at #37.

Taylor was voted No. 2 on Paramount's CMT 12-Pack Countdown and the second most added album on Americana Radio Association's AMA/CDX Radio Chart.

== Early life and education ==
Taylor was born in Hindman, Kentucky, near the Country Music Highway (Route 23), named after the high number of well known artists who grew up there as well, including Loretta Lynn, Ricky Skaggs, Tom T. Hall, Chris Stapleton, Tyler Childers, and Patty Loveless.

Taylor performed on local Opry stages from a young age. In 2007, she moved to Nashville to study music at Middle Tennessee State University in Murfreesboro. She took classes with Mark Stephen Jones and scheduled co-writing sessions three days a week. In 2012, she signed a publishing contract. She also shortly joined the country duo Triple Run, got married, and started a mini-farm. In 2017, she got divorced, her band disbanded, she nearly lost her home, and in 2018, she lost her publishing deal.

Shortly after the collapse of her publishing deal, Taylor met Dan Auerbach, who cowrote eight songs in two days with her, five of which, including “Back in the Fire,” “Love Me Back” and “Real Me,” premiered on her album "Real Me."

She restarted her music career funded by launching a cleaning business, singing on Broadway seven nights a week, making and sharing demos, and cold calling record label executives. She created her own record label, Cut A Shine Records. In 2021, she got remarried to Adam Chaffins, who has also cowritten and coproduced several songs in her discography.

In 2023, Taylor signed a deal between Cut A Shine Records and Thirty Tigers and a publishing contract with Reservoir and One Riot.

== Musical career ==
Taylor's music is influenced by Patty Loveless, Karen Carpenter, Glen Campbell, and disco. Running the gamut from Patsy Cline to Elvis to George Jones. Her music has been described as "a heady mix of Appalachian twang, Patsy Cline’s tears and strong, resilient female empowerment," "steel guitar-drenched, laid back" sound that "hits traditional country notes", with her "liquid alto singing voice, with bright teardrop accents."

In 2021 and 2022, Taylor performed at AMERICANAFEST in Nashville and in 2022 opened for Alabama, Dwight Yoakam, Kelsey Waldon, Robert Earl Keen and Ian Noe. Starting in 2022, she toured with Blackberry Smoke.

Grammy-winners Sturgill Simpson and David R. Ferguson produced Taylor’s second album, Kentucky Blue, which Wide Open Country and Saving Country Music listed among the Most Anticipated Albums of 2023. PBS featured Wide Open Country as a prerelease song on “The Caverns Sessions” in November 2022. Kentucky Blue reached the Top 15 on iTunes Country Album chart and was the feature cover of Spotify’s The Pulse of Americana playlist when it was first released.

Taylor performed at the Grand Ole Opry on March 22, 2023.

=== Albums and EPs ===
Title	Details	Songs	Collaborators	Notable
Kentucky Blue	Release date: February 3, 2023 Produced by Sturgill Simpson and David R. Ferguson Distributed by Cut A Shine Records	Cabin in the Woods - 3:44; Anything but You - 2:59; Kentucky Blue - 2:59; Rich Little Girls - 2:59; No Cowboys - 3:47; If You Don't Wanna Love Me - 2:59; Ain't a Hard Livin' - 2:46; Love's Never Been That Good to Me - 3:45; For a Night - 4:00; Best We Can Do - 3:23	Cowriters: Cliff Audretch; Nick Autry; Adam Chaffins; Kimberly Kelly; Pat McLaughlin; Jerry Salley; Adam Wright; Jason White	Reached Top 15 on iTunes Country Album chart Feature cover of Spotify’s The Pulse of Americana playlist
Ain't a Hard Livin'	Release date: 2023 Produced by Sturgill Simpson and David R. Ferguson Distributed by Cut A Shine Records	Ain't a Hard Livin' - 2:46; Rich Little Girls - 2:59; Kentucky Blue - 2:59; Cabin in the Woods - 3:44	Cowriters: Kimberly Kelly; Pat McLaughlin; Adam Wright	
Rich Little Girls	Release date: 2022 Produced by Sturgill Simpson and David R. Ferguson Distributed by Cut A Shine Records Published by Bluewater Music Services Corp.	Rich Little Girls - 2:59; Kentucky Blue - 2:59; Cabin in the Woods - 3:44	Cowriters: Adam Wright; Kimberly Kelly	
Kentucky Blue	Release date: 2022 Produced by Sturgill Simpson and David R. Ferguson Distributed by Cut A Shine Records	Kentucky Blue - 2:59; Cabin in the Woods - 3:44	Cowriters: Adam Wright; Kimberly Kelly	
Real Me (Deluxe)	Release date: 2021 Produced by Dave Brainard Distributed by Cut A Shine Records Published by Wixen Music Publishing, Inc.	Back in the Fire - 2:52; Real Me - 3:19; Wagon - 3:02; Waking up Ain't Easy - 3:23; Love Me Back - 2:59; Broken Heart Breaks - 2:38; Married Again - 2:29; Leave Me Tomorrow - 2:50; Raggedy Heart - 2:52; Go Down Swingin' - 2:19; Ain't That Lonely Yet - 2:57; I Go to Pieces - 2:57; At Least There's No Babies - 3:48	Cowriters: Dan Auerbach; Roger Cook (songwriter); Will Hoge; James House (singer); Marcus Hummon; Kostas; Pat McLaughlin; Jerry Salley; Del Shannon; Jason White; Bobby Wood; Dee White - cowriter, coperformer	
Real Me	Release date: 2020 Produced by Dave Brainard Distributed by Cut A Shine Records Published by Wixen Music Publishing, Inc.	Back in the Fire - 2:52; Real Me - 3:19; Wagon - 3:02; Waking up Ain't Easy - 3:23; Love Me Back - 2:59; Broken Heart Breaks - 2:38; Married Again - 2:29; Raggedy Heart - 2:52; Go Down Swingin' - 2:19	Cowriters: Dan Auerbach; Roger Cook (songwriter); Will Hoge; Marcus Hummon; Pat McLaughlin; Jerry Salley; Jason White; Bobby Wood	Real Me opened as the highest-ranking debut album on the AMA/CDX Radio Chart at #37 “Back In The Fire” debuted at #46 on the AMA/CDX Americana Top 50 singles chart. Waking Up Ain’t Easy was used in the Paramount+ series Tulsa King.

=== Singles ===
Title	Details	Collaborators	Notable
Gone as It Gets	Release date: 2022 Produced by Andrew Petroff	Cowriters: Margaret McRee; Adam Chaffins; Benjamin Chapman	
Lonely on Christmas	Release date: 2022 Produced by Adam Chaffins Distributed by Cut A Shine Records	Jason White - cowriter Mike and the Moonpies - coperformers	
Cabin in the Woods	Release date: 2021 Produced by Sturgill Simpson and David R. Ferguson Distributed by Cut A Shine Records	Jason White - cowriter	
At Least There's No Babies	Release date: 2021 Distributed by Cut A Shine Records	Dee White - cowriter, coperformer	
Broken Heart Breaks	Release date: 2020 Distributed by Cut A Shine Records Published by Wixen Music Publishing, Inc.	Cowriters: Dan Auerbach; Joe Allen; Pat McLaughlin	
Back in the Fire	Release date: 2020 Distributed by Cut A Shine Records Published by Wixen Music Publishing, Inc.	Dan Auerbach - cowriter Pat McLaughlin - cowriter	
Wagon	Release date: 2020 Distributed by Cut A Shine Records	Marcus Hummon - cowriter	
Waking Up Ain't Easy	Release date: 2020 Distributed by Cut A Shine Records	Dave Brainard - cowriter	
