= Bolen Building =

- U.S. National Register of Historic Places
- U.S. Historic district – Contributing property
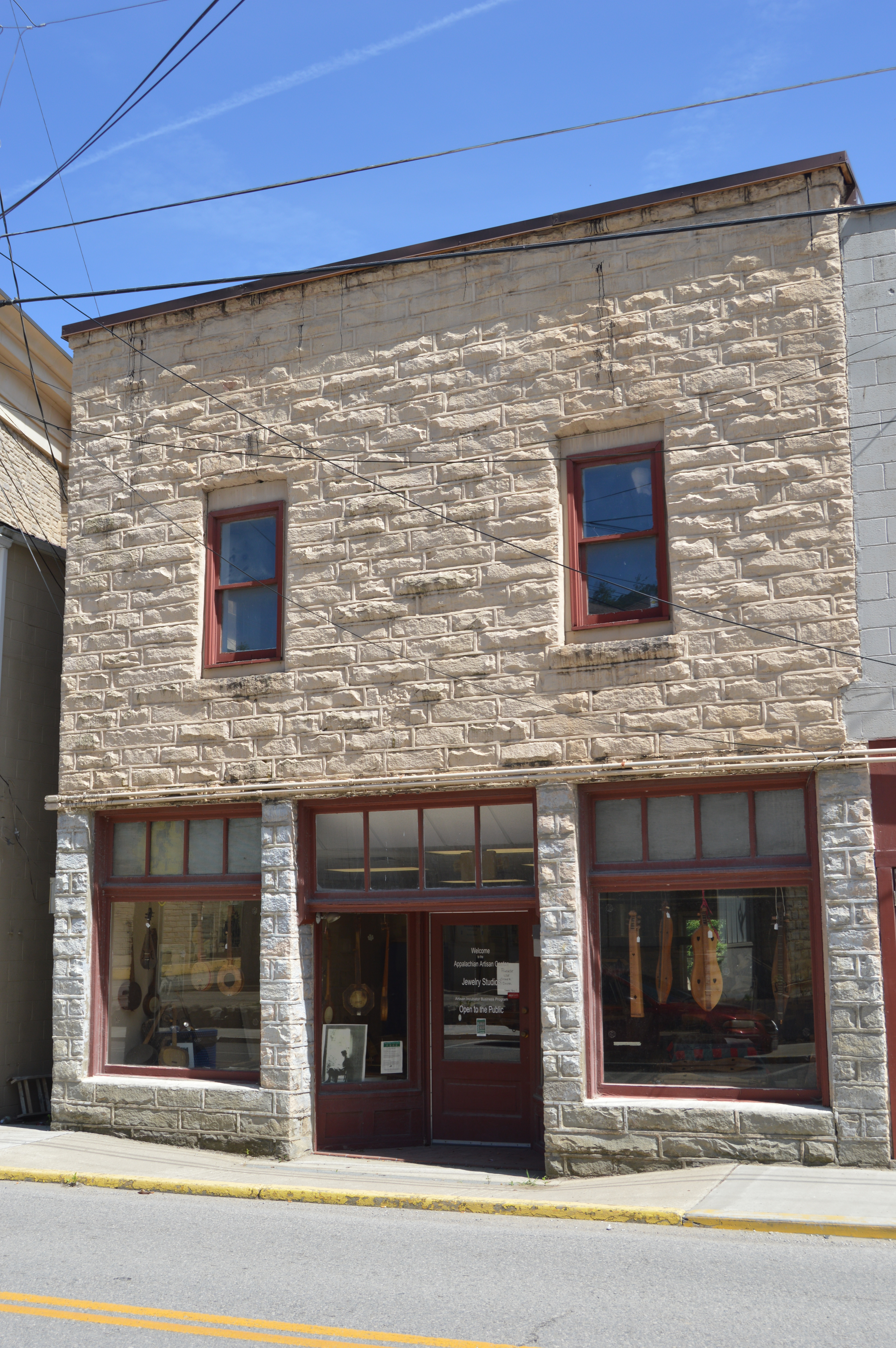

- Location within Kentucky Location within the United States
- Location: 85 W. Main St., Hindman, Kentucky
- Coordinates: 37°20′4″N 82°58′56″W
- Area: less than one acre
- Built: 1939
- Part of: Hindman Historic District (ID13000112)
- NRHP reference No.: 07000676

Significant dates
- Added to NRHP: July 11, 2007
- Designated CP: August 4, 2016

The Bolen Building, located at 85 W. Main St. in Hindman, Kentucky, was built in 1939–1942. It was listed on the National Register of Historic Places in 2007.

It is a two-story, stone commercial building, with construction typical for stone buildings in Hindman. Its storefront appears to be original, and includes a recessed single-door entry with angled windows.

It is also a contributing building in the Hindman Historic District, which was listed on the National Register in 2013.

In 2018 the building is an art gallery, the Appalachian Artisan Center.
