= Ben Franklin (company) =

American retail store chain

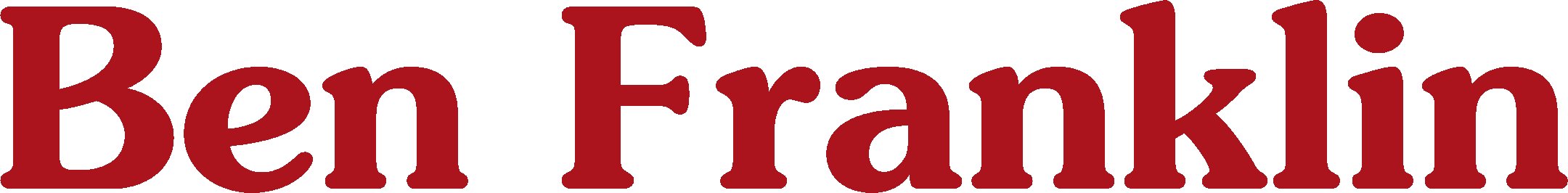
- Type: Private
- Founded: 1877; 149 years ago (as Butler Brothers); 1927; 99 years ago (as Ben Franklin)
- Headquarters: Mount Pleasant, Wisconsin, U.S.
- Area served: United States
- Products: Crafts
- Owner: Promotions Unlimited

Ben Franklin is a chain of five and dime and arts and crafts stores found primarily in small towns throughout the United States, last owned by Promotions Unlimited of Mount Pleasant, Wisconsin. They are organized using a franchise system, with individual stores owned by independent proprietors. It was perhaps the first retail franchise, starting in 1927. They are named after Benjamin Franklin, taking a cue in their merchandise offerings from Franklin's saying, "A penny saved is a penny earned." Although Promotions Unlimited filed for bankruptcy in 2017, a number of stores continue to operate under the Ben Franklin name.

== History ==
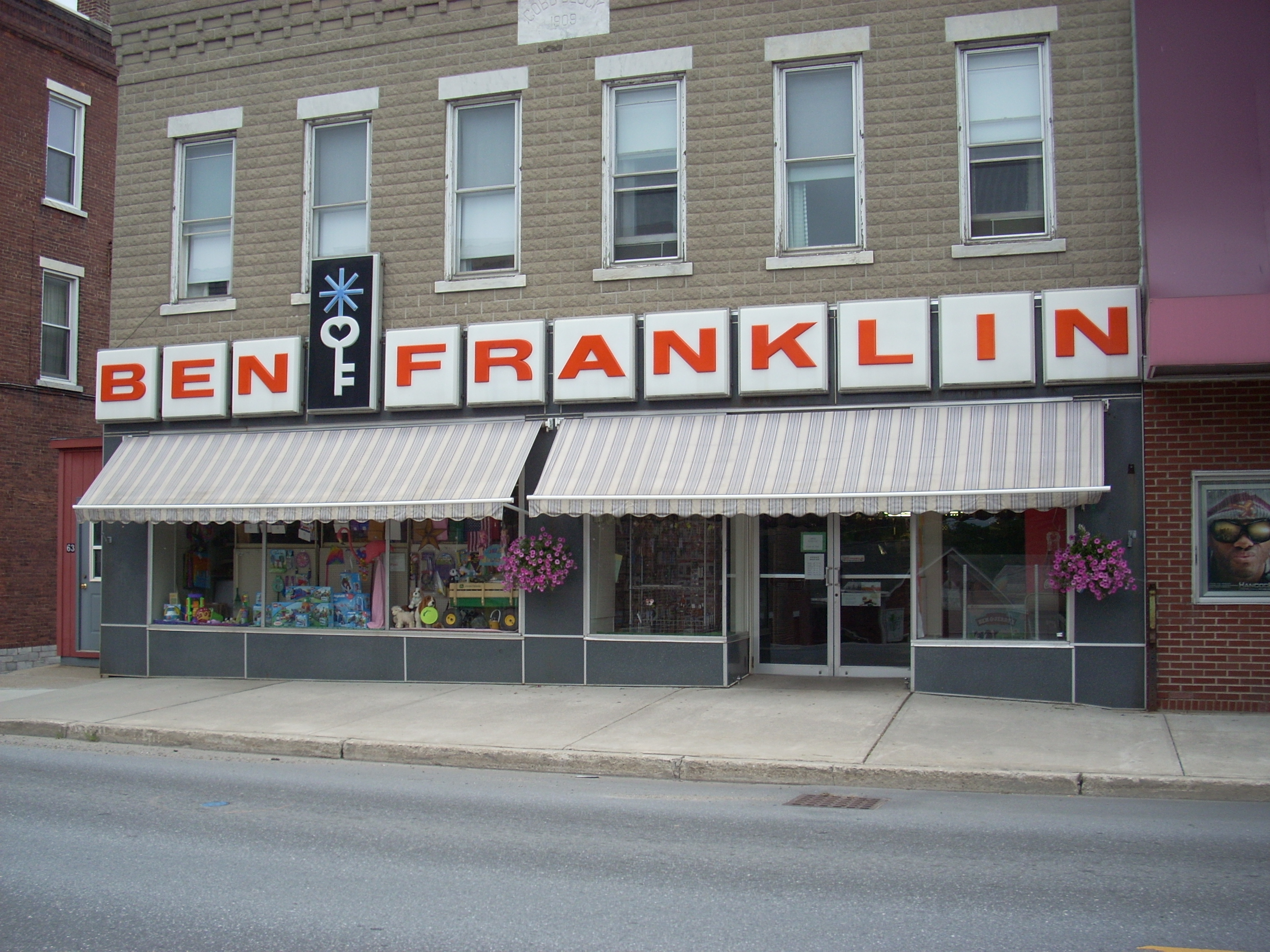
A Ben Franklin Store in Middlebury, Vermont, in 2008. This location closed in 2018.

=== Origins ===
The chain originated in Boston in 1877 as Butler Brothers, a mail-order wholesaler selling general and variety-store items. At the turn of the 20th century, Butler Brothers had over 100,000 customers in the United States. As variety stores were penetrating their market, the company founded the Ben Franklin chain in 1927, which was sold in 1959. At Ben Franklin's peak, the chain had 2,500 stores nationwide.

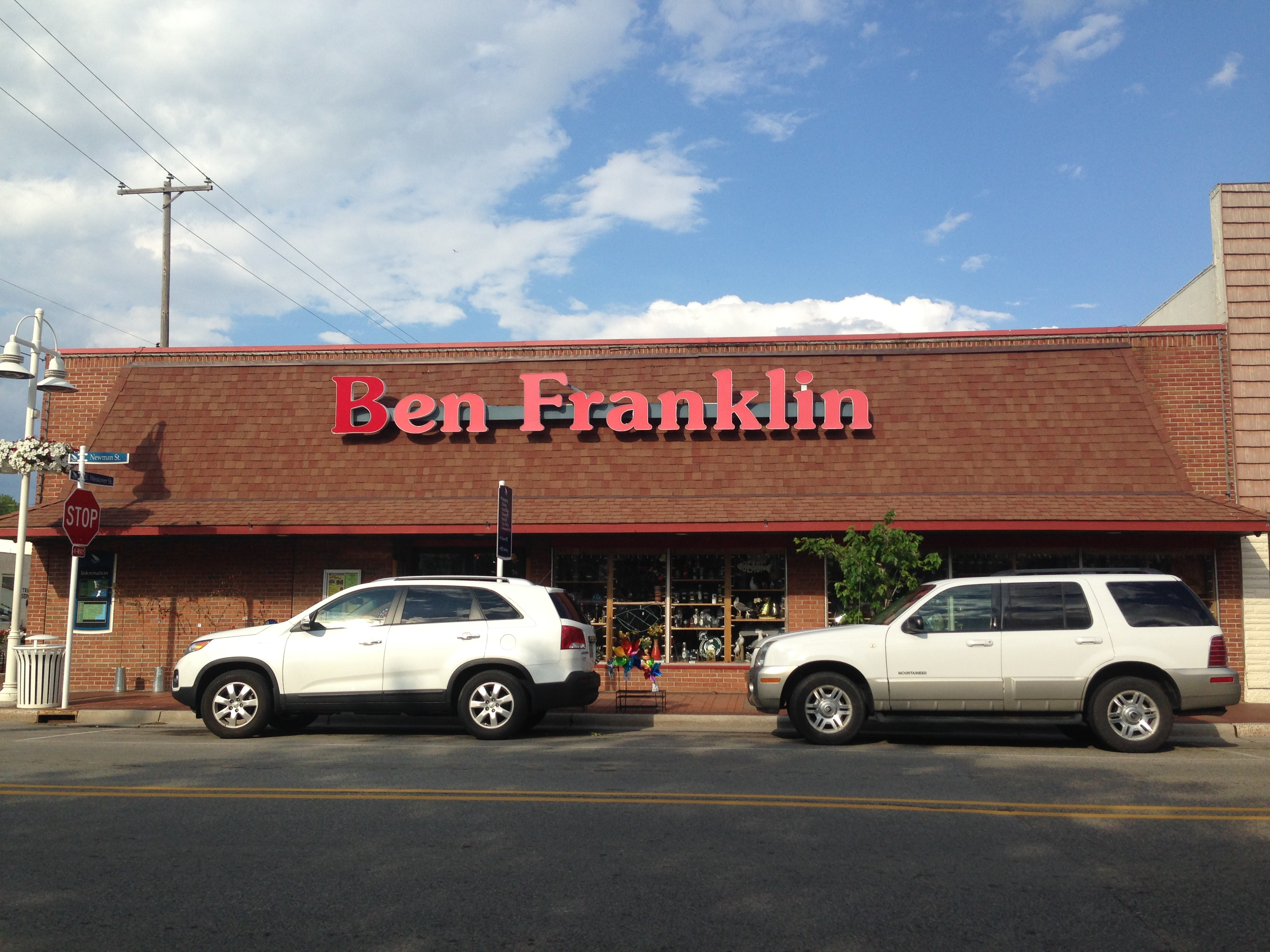
A Ben Franklin store in East Tawas, Michigan.

Ben Franklin Stores purchased Texas retailer Duke & Ayres in the early 1970s. Duke & Ayres was a chain of 5 and 10 cent stores based in Dallas, Texas, with stores that were located throughout the state from approximately 1910 to 1990.

In the 1970s, Ben Franklin operated some Ben Franklin Family Center locations, which were larger discount store variations offering merchandise not found at regular Ben Franklin stores, such as clothing. Other locations in this era were branded as B&C Family Center and included supermarkets.

=== Bankruptcy ===
The chain had functioned largely as a wholesaler of variety and craft merchandise sold to its franchisees under the name Ben Franklin Retail Stores Inc. In the early 1990s, it began opening its own stores. Those stores were not successful, and their financial problems ultimately interfered with the chain's ability to deliver goods to its franchisees, 860 locally owned stores in 47 states. The company went bankrupt and closed these stores in 1996–1997.

True Value owner Cotter & Co. sold its V&S Variety Store chain to Ben Franklin in 1995.

=== Promotions Unlimited ===
Promotions Unlimited had stepped in as a supplier for many Ben Franklin franchisees during the corporation's descent into bankruptcy. It acquired the name of the chain in 1997 as the old corporate entity was moving into Chapter 7. It continued operating as a distributor servicing individual franchisees and advertising the products sold there through direct mail services and newspaper inserts. Promotions Unlimited provided similar advertising and promotional services for thousands of other retail stores unaffiliated with Ben Franklin Stores. Promotions Unlimited went bankrupt in 2017. Despite the bankruptcy, several stores across the United States continue to operate under the Ben Franklin name.

== Impact ==
- Sam Walton, who later became the founder of Walmart, started in retailing operating a Ben Franklin store.
- Dollar Tree traces its roots to K. R. Perry, who in 1953 opened a Ben Franklin variety store in Norfolk, Virginia.
- In 1973, Michael J. Dupey converted a Ben Franklin store to start the Michaels chain in Texas.

== See also ==
- Hindman Ben Franklin: Listed on the National Register of Historic Places in Kentucky
