= Big Lovely Mountain =

Mountain in Kentucky, United States

Coordinates: 37.5137439°N 83.0814899°W

Big Lovely Mountain is a summit in Knott County, Kentucky, in the United States. With an elevation of 1,401 feet (427 m), Big Lovely Mountain is the 272nd highest summit in the state of Kentucky.
