= Spider, Kentucky =

Unincorporated community in Kentucky, United States

- Unincorporated community
- Location within Kentucky Location within the United States
- Coordinates: 37°15′31″N 82°54′44″W
- Country: United States
- State: Kentucky
- County: Knott
- Elevation: 1,076 ft (328 m)
- Time zone: UTC-6 (Central (CST))
  - Summer (DST): UTC-5 (CST)
- GNIS feature ID: 509108

Spider is an unincorporated community located in Knott County, Kentucky, United States. Its post office was established in 1910, and closed in 1957.
