= Wolfpen (Mallie, Kentucky) =

- Jacobs Hall, Kentucky School for the Deaf
- U.S. National Register of Historic Places
- Location within Kentucky Location within the United States
- Location: 105 Dead Mare Branch, Mallie, Kentucky
- Coordinates: 37°14′19″N 82°55′28″W
- Area: less than one acre
- NRHP reference No.: 12001200
- Added to NRHP: January 7, 2014

Wolfpen, in Mallie, Kentucky, is a historic site which was listed on the National Register of Historic Places in 2014.

It is the log house which became a retreat of author James Still, author of The Wolfpen Notebooks.
