= Pine Top, Kentucky =

Unincorporated community in Kentucky, United States

Pine Top, Kentucky Omaha
- Unincorporated community
- Location within Kentucky Location within the United States
- Coordinates: 37°16′21″N 82°52′57″W
- Country: United States
- State: Kentucky
- County: Knott
- Elevation: 1,132 ft (345 m)
- Time zone: UTC-5 (Eastern (EST))
  - Summer (DST): UTC-4 (EDT)
- ZIP codes: 41843
- GNIS feature ID: 508824

Pine Top is an unincorporated community within Knott County, Kentucky, United States.
