= Handshoe, Kentucky =

Unincorporated community in Kentucky, United States

- Unincorporated community
- Location within Kentucky Location within the United States
- Coordinates: 37°28′12″N 82°54′24″W
- Country: United States
- State: Kentucky
- County: Knott
- Elevation: 991 ft (302 m)
- Time zone: UTC-5 (Eastern (EST))
  - Summer (DST): UTC-4 (EDT)
- GNIS feature ID: 508171

Handshoe is an unincorporated community within Knott County, Kentucky, United States. Its post office is closed.
