= Kite, Kentucky =

Unincorporated community in Kentucky, United States

- Unincorporated community
- Location within Kentucky Location within the United States
- Coordinates: 37°19′16″N 82°48′11″W
- Country: United States
- State: Kentucky
- County: Knott
- Elevation: 896 ft (273 m)
- Time zone: UTC-5 (Eastern (EST))
  - Summer (DST): UTC-4 (EDT)
- ZIP codes: 41828
- GNIS feature ID: 508399

Kite is an unincorporated community located in Knott County, Kentucky, United States.
