= Knott County Central High School =

Location
- 76 Patriot Lane; Hindman, Kentucky 41822; United States
- Coordinates: 37°19′26″N 82°58′9″W

Information
- Type: Public
- Established: 1974
- Principal: Bobby Pollard
- Teaching staff: 42.00 (FTE)
- Grades: 9-12
- Enrollment: 553 (2023-2024)
- Student to teacher ratio: 13.17
- Colors: Navy, cardinal and white
- Mascot: Patriots
- Website: https://www.knott.k12.ky.us/knottcountycentralhighschool_home.aspx

Knott County Central High School is a high school located in Hindman, Kentucky.

It is home to the Knott County Central Patriots, who have claimed several regional titles in basketball, baseball, track, volleyball and other sports.

== History ==
The school was founded in 1974 by a consolidation of three smaller county schools: Hindman High School, Carr Creek High School (both state basketball champions), and Knott County High School. This made the first graduating class, the class of 1975. At this time the school was not equipped with the space for a baseball team nor a football team. These extra-curricular activities came at a later time. The lower spot cleared off to the left of the school was only used to practice the marching band routines. The Marching Patriots earned several awards in marching and in stage band the first few years that the school was opened.

== Activities ==
The school's speech team, which has 21 regional titles, has captured the KHSSL (Kentucky High School Speech League) State Championship in 2004, 2005 and most recently in 2024 under head coach Bria Stacy, as well as The Smokey Mountain National Invitational Championship 4 times, the most recent being 2009.

In March 2010 the Knott County Central High School's boys' basketball team claimed the 14th region championship title, taking them to the state tournament for the first time in 17 years. In 2011, the boys' basketball team made history once again by winning the school's first ever Lexington Invitational title (iHigh Invitational) as well as the school's first WYMT Mountain Classic Championship. The 2011–2012 boys' basketball team went on to win the 2012 14th Region Championship and advanced to the quarterfinals of the 2012 Kentucky Sweet 16 Boys Basketball State Tournament.

In 2012, Knott County Central's cheerleaders were named the State In-Game Champions at the 2012 Kentucky Sweet 16 Boys Basketball State Tournament, marking the first state championship in program history.

In 2024 Knott County Central's Lady Patriots volleyball team for the first time in school history captured the 14th region title and went on to win the first round of the KHSAA Volleyball sweet 16 on their home court, the Morton Combs Athletic Complex over Ashland Blazer

== Notable students ==
- Rebecca Gayheart - fashion model and television and film actress
- Camron Justice - Kentucky Mr. Basketball and Gatorade Player of the Year in 2015
