= Wolfpen Creek (Indian Creek tributary) =

Stream in the American state of Missouri

Coordinates: 39.232265°N 91.320706°W

Wolfpen Creek is a stream in Pike County in the U.S. state of Missouri. It is a tributary of Indian Creek.

Wolfpen Creek took its name from the wolf pen, a device used to snare wolves.

== See also ==
- List of rivers of Missouri
