= Knott County, Kentucky =

County in Kentucky, United States

- County
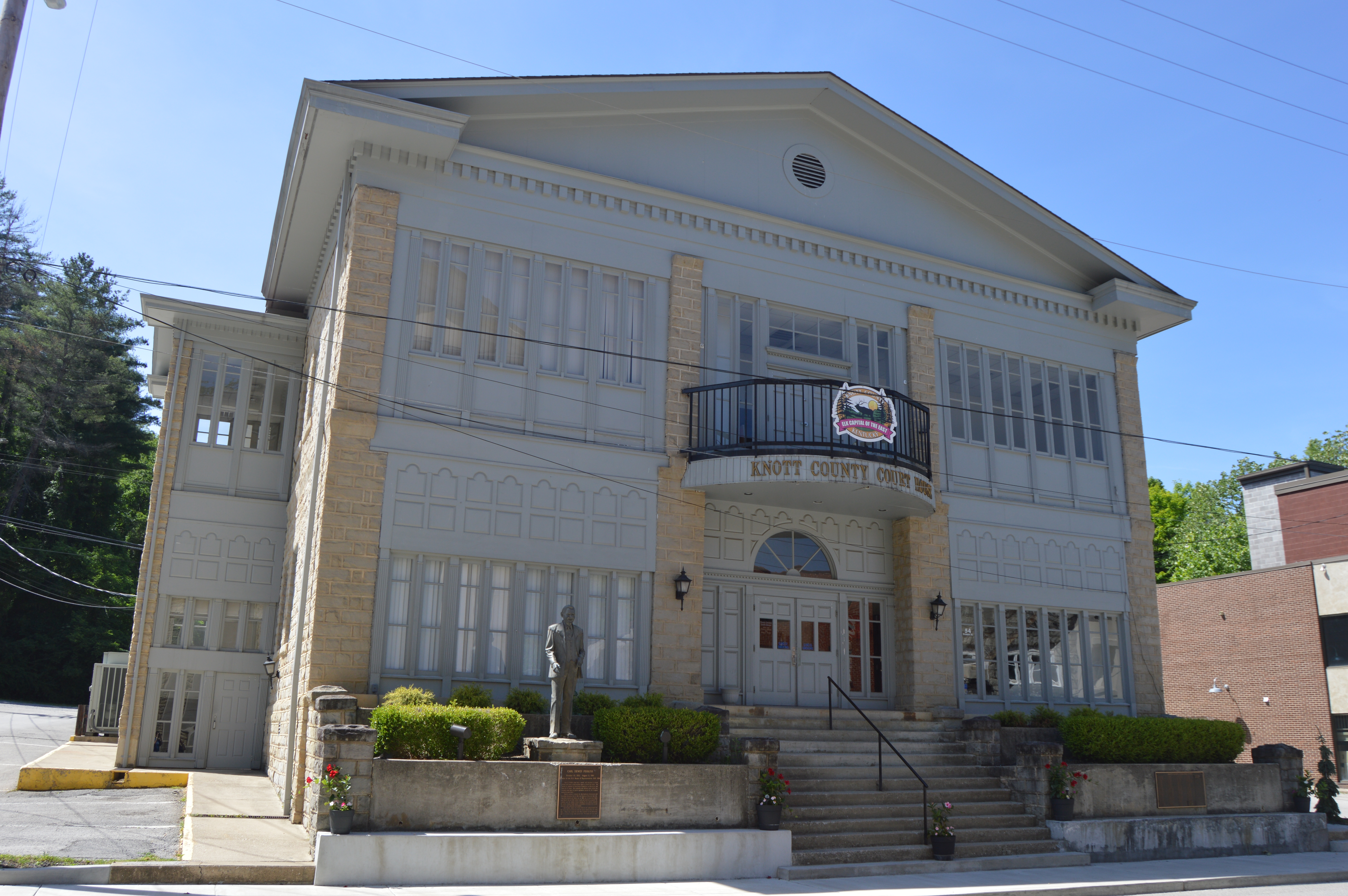
- Knott County Courthouse

- Location within the U.S. state of Kentucky
- Coordinates: 37°21′N 82°57′W
- Country: United States
- State: Kentucky
- Founded: 1884
- Named for: James Proctor Knott
- Seat: Hindman
- Largest city: Hindman

Government
  - Judge/Executive: Jeff Dobson (R)

Area
  - Total: 353 sq mi (910 km^{2})
  - Land: 352 sq mi (910 km^{2})
  - Water: 1.3 sq mi (3.4 km^{2}) 0.4%

Population (2020)
  - Total: 14,251
  - Estimate (2025): 13,321 ▼
  - Density: 40.5/sq mi (15.6/km^{2})
- Time zone: UTC−5 (Eastern)
  - Summer (DST): UTC−4 (EDT)
- Congressional district: 5th

Knott County is a county located in the U.S. state of Kentucky. As of the 2020 census, the population was 14,251. Its county seat is Hindman. The county was formed in 1884 and is named for James Proctor Knott, Governor of Kentucky (1883–1887). As of 2024 the county is now wet. Its county seat is home to the Hindman Settlement School, founded as America's first settlement school. The Knott County town of Pippa Passes is home to Alice Lloyd College.

== History ==
Knott County was established in 1884 from land given by Breathitt, Floyd, Letcher, and Perry counties. The 1890s-era courthouse, the second to serve the county, burned in 1929.

The first elected county officials were county clerk Lewis Hays (an early settler of The Forks of Troublesome defeating fellow early settler F. P. Allen), county judge David Calhoun, county attorney Fielding Johnson, sheriff Madison Pigman, jailer Isom Slone, and county assessor Hiram Maggard. The political lines drawn in the early politics of the county were largely along divisions between the early settler families of The Forks, inherited from Civil War differences.

In a later election Anderson Hays ran against Clabe Jones, who had been on opposite sides in the Civil War, with Jones winning the election. This caused a feud that lasted several years, with fights and deaths in Hindman.

Knott county was one of the counties affected by the 2022 Appalachian floods, and was the county with the most fatalities.

== Geography ==
According to the United States Census Bureau, the county has a total area of 353 square miles (910 km^{2}), of which 352 square miles (910 km^{2}) is land and 1.3 square miles (3.4 km^{2}) (0.4%) is water.

=== Adjacent counties ===
- Magoffin County (north)
- Floyd County (northeast)
- Pike County (east)
- Letcher County (south)
- Perry County (southwest)
- Breathitt County (northwest)

=== Summits ===
Big Lovely Mountain, 1,401 feet (427 m)

== Demographics ==
Historical population
Census	Pop.	Note	%±
1890	5,438		—
1900	8,704		60.1%
1910	10,791		24.0%
1920	11,655		8.0%
1930	15,230		30.7%
1940	20,007		31.4%
1950	20,320		1.6%
1960	17,362		−14.6%
1970	14,698		−15.3%
1980	17,940		22.1%
1990	17,906		−0.2%
2000	17,649		−1.4%
2010	16,346		−7.4%
2020	14,251		−12.8%
2025 (est.)	13,321	▼	−6.5%
U.S. Decennial Census; 1790-1960 1900-1990; 1990-2000 2010-2020

=== 2020 census ===
As of the 2020 census, the county had a population of 14,251. The median age was 43.5 years. 21.2% of residents were under the age of 18 and 19.2% of residents were 65 years of age or older. For every 100 females there were 97.5 males, and for every 100 females age 18 and over there were 95.0 males age 18 and over.

The racial makeup of the county was 97.3% White, 0.5% Black or African American, 0.1% American Indian and Alaska Native, 0.1% Asian, 0.0% Native Hawaiian and Pacific Islander, 0.1% from some other race, and 1.9% from two or more races. Hispanic or Latino residents of any race comprised 0.6% of the population.

0.0% of residents lived in urban areas, while 100.0% lived in rural areas.

There were 5,749 households in the county, of which 27.5% had children under the age of 18 living with them and 29.2% had a female householder with no spouse or partner present. About 30.5% of all households were made up of individuals and 13.2% had someone living alone who was 65 years of age or older.

There were 6,639 housing units, of which 13.4% were vacant. Among occupied housing units, 76.6% were owner-occupied and 23.4% were renter-occupied. The homeowner vacancy rate was 1.0% and the rental vacancy rate was 7.3%.

=== 2000 census ===
As of the census of 2000, there were 17,649 people, 6,717 households, and 4,990 families residing in the county. The population density was 50 per square mile (19/km^{2}). There were 7,579 housing units at an average density of 22 per square mile (8.5/km^{2}). The racial makeup of the county was 98.27% White, 0.73% Black or African American, 0.11% Native American, 0.15% Asian, 0.01% Pacific Islander, 0.12% from other races, and 0.60% from two or more races. 0.63% of the population were Hispanic or Latino of any race.

There were 6,717 households, out of which 34.40% had children under the age of 18 living with them, 57.60% were married couples living together, 12.60% had a female householder with no husband present, and 25.70% were non-families. 23.60% of all households were made up of individuals, and 9.30% had someone living alone who was 65 years of age or older. The average household size was 2.54 and the average family size was 3.00.

In the county, the population was spread out, with 24.50% under the age of 18, 10.80% from 18 to 24, 29.00% from 25 to 44, 24.30% from 45 to 64, and 11.40% who were 65 years of age or older. The median age was 36 years. For every 100 females there were 97.30 males. For every 100 females age 18 and over, there were 94.10 males.

The median income for a household in the county was $20,373, and the median income for a family was $24,930. Males had a median income of $29,471 versus $21,240 for females. The per capita income for the county was $11,297. About 26.20% of families and 31.10% of the population were below the poverty line, including 39.80% of those under age 18 and 23.10% of those age 65 or over.

== Education ==
=== Knott County Schools ===
- Knott County Central High School
- Knott County Area Technology Center
- Beaver Creek Elementary
- Carr Creek Elementary
- Cordia School
- Emmalena Elementary
- Hindman Elementary
- Jones Fork Elementary

=== Private schools ===
- Bethel Christian Academy
- Hindman Settlement School
- June Buchanan School

=== Higher education ===
- Knott County Campus of Hazard Community and Technical College
- Alice Lloyd College

== Politics ==
United States presidential election results for Knott County, Kentucky
Year	Republican		Democratic		Third party(ies)	
Year	No.	%	No.	%	No.	%
1912	387	23.74%	1,114	68.34%	129	7.91%
1916	571	28.14%	1,454	71.66%	4	0.20%
1920	802	25.80%	2,295	73.84%	11	0.35%
1924	886	27.75%	2,286	71.59%	21	0.66%
1928	1,004	26.24%	2,822	73.76%	0	0.00%
1932	747	14.39%	4,443	85.61%	0	0.00%
1936	865	19.87%	3,488	80.13%	0	0.00%
1940	759	14.62%	4,434	85.38%	0	0.00%
1944	803	17.19%	3,867	82.81%	0	0.00%
1948	754	13.93%	4,660	86.07%	0	0.00%
1952	1,124	20.14%	4,437	79.49%	21	0.38%
1956	1,715	30.02%	3,987	69.80%	10	0.18%
1960	1,412	26.30%	3,957	73.70%	0	0.00%
1964	482	9.22%	4,739	90.61%	9	0.17%
1968	1,098	22.56%	3,335	68.52%	434	8.92%
1972	1,479	34.50%	2,774	64.71%	34	0.79%
1976	962	16.65%	4,762	82.40%	55	0.95%
1980	1,602	22.68%	5,405	76.50%	58	0.82%
1984	1,728	27.66%	4,487	71.81%	33	0.53%
1988	1,691	24.42%	5,185	74.86%	50	0.72%
1992	1,243	16.96%	5,500	75.05%	585	7.98%
1996	1,201	18.18%	4,842	73.29%	564	8.54%
2000	2,029	31.42%	4,349	67.34%	80	1.24%
2004	2,648	35.81%	4,685	63.36%	61	0.82%
2008	3,070	52.75%	2,612	44.88%	138	2.37%
2012	4,130	72.55%	1,420	24.94%	143	2.51%
2016	4,357	75.60%	1,245	21.60%	161	2.79%
2020	4,780	76.46%	1,412	22.58%	60	0.96%
2024	4,732	78.67%	1,181	19.63%	102	1.70%

Knott County had historically voted very strongly for the Democratic Party. In 1992, 75% of Knott County residents voted for Democrat Bill Clinton for US president, the highest percentage for Clinton of any county in the state. However, in recent years, Knott County has voted more favorably for the Republican Party. In the 2008 presidential election, Republican John McCain became the first Republican to win Knott County in a presidential election by winning 52.6% of the vote to Barack Obama's 45%.

When Governor Ernie Fletcher appointed Republican Randy Thompson as County Judge Executive in 2005, it was the first time the county ever had a Republican Judge Executive. Thompson won re-election in 2006 and again in 2010, making him the first Republican to win election in a Knott County office. Randy Thompson was later convicted in federal court of running a vote buying scheme and sentenced to 40 months in the federal prison system.

=== Elected officials ===
Elected officials as of January 3, 2025
U.S. House	Hal Rogers (R)	KY 5
Ky. Senate	Scott Madon (R)	29
Ky. House	John Blanton (R)	92

== Economy ==
=== Coal companies in Knott County ===
- Alpha Natural Resources
- James River Coal Company

== Areas of interest ==
Tourism is increasing in the county, especially the popularity of elk viewing. Knott County and its surrounding counties are home to 5,700 free ranging elk, the largest elk herd east of the Mississippi River. There is an ATV Training Center dedicated to the safety of ATV usage amongst riders and the Knott County Sportsplex, a sports complex which has indoor basketball courts, outside baseball fields, a soccer field, and a fitness center.

== Media ==
=== Television ===
Hometown24

=== Radio ===
- WKCB-FM
- WKCB-AM
- WWJD-FM

=== Newspapers ===
- Troublesome Creek Times

== Communities ==
=== Cities ===
- Hindman (county seat)
- Pippa Passes

=== Unincorporated communities ===
- Anco
- Bath
- Bearville
- Betty
- Breeding Creek
- Carrie
- Dema (part)
- Elic
- Elmrock
- Emmalena
- Fisty
- Garner
- Handshoe
- Hollybush
- Indian Grave
- Irishmans
- Jones Fork
- Kite
- Leburn
- Littcarr
- Mallie
- Mousie
- Pine Top
- Raven
- Redfox
- Ritchie
- Sassafras
- Slone Fork
- Soft Shell
- Spider
- Talcum
- Tina
- Topmost
- Vest
- Vicco (part)
- Wiscoal

== Infrastructure ==
=== Transportation ===
Public transportation is provided by LKLP Community Action Partnership with demand-response service and scheduled service from Hindman to Hazard.

== Notable residents ==
- Lige Clarke (1942−1975), LGBT activist, journalist and author
- Rebecca Gayheart (born 1971), actress and model
- Carl Dewey Perkins (1912−1984), politician and member of the United States House of Representatives
- James Still (1906–2001), author folklorist
- David Tolliver, musician; member of country band Halfway to Hazard

== In popular culture ==
- 20th Century Fox filmed several scenes in the county for a nationally released movie Fire Down Below

== See also ==
- National Register of Historic Places listings in Knott County, Kentucky
- Robinson Forest
