= The Forks of Troublesome =

Rivers in Kentucky, USA

Physical characteristics
- Source: Left Fork headwaters
  - coordinates: 37°19′31″N 82°54′23″W
- 2nd source: Nealy Branch headwaters
  - coordinates: 37°20′32″N 82°53′24″W
- 3rd source: Right Fork headwaters
  - coordinates: 37°17′31″N 82°54′58″W
- 4th source: Reynolds Fork headwaters
  - coordinates: 37°18′45″N 82°54′15″W
- Mouth: Troublesome Creek
  - location: Hindman, Kentucky
  - coordinates: 37°20′05″N 82°58′51″W
  - elevation: 1,015 feet (309 m)

Basin features
- post offices: Hindman: 37°20′09″N 82°58′53″W; Leburn: 37°20′52″N 82°57′23″W; Garner: 37°21′21″N 82°55′38″W; Mallie: 37°18′10″N 82°55′01″W

The Forks of Troublesome, more simply The Forks, are the Left Fork and Right Fork tributaries of Troublesome Creek in what is now Knott County, Kentucky. This was the name of the place where they met until the city of Hindman was established as the county seat in April 1884, and the name used in the Act of the Kentucky General Assembly that established Knott County. At the time, The Forks was in Letcher County, Kentucky.

Left Fork is 6 miles (9.7 km) long, and Right Fork is 6.5 miles (10.5 km) long.

Early settlers in the area were Samuel Cornett who had a home and a watermill on Left Fork, followed by the families of Peyton M. Duke and Anderson Hays.

== Tributaries and other locations ==
What is now Hindman is 42.75 miles (68.80 km) upstream along Troublesome Creek from its mouth, at an altitude (measured at the town courthouse steps) of 1,032 feet (315 m)

- Upstream, the major tributaries are:
  - Right Fork at an altitude of 1,015 feet (309 m)
    - Baker Branch 0.375 miles (0.604 km) upstream at an altitude of 1,020 feet (310 m)
    - Perkins Branch 1.25 miles (2.01 km) upstream at an altitude of 1,035 feet (315 m), mouth at 37°19′21″N 82°58′02″W headwaters at 37°17′51″N 82°58′08″W
    - Cave Branch 1.75 miles (2.82 km) upstream at an altitude of 1,040 feet (320 m), mouth at 37°19′11″N 82°57′37″W headwaters at 37°17′46″N 82°57′32″W
    - Parks Branch 1.875 miles (3.018 km) upstream at an altitude of 1,045 feet (319 m), mouth at 37°19′09″N 82°57′30″W headwaters at 37°19′49″N 82°56′30″W
    - Trace Fork 2.5 miles (4.0 km) upstream at an altitude of 1,060 feet (320 m), mouth at 37°18′56″N 82°56′52″W forks at 37°17′46″N 82°56′45″W
      - Right Fork 1.5 miles (2.4 km) upstream at an altitude of 1,175 feet (358 m), headwaters at 37°17′35″N 82°56′31″W
      - Left Fork 1.5 miles (2.4 km) upstream at an altitude of 1,175 feet (358 m), headwaters at 37°17′41″N 82°56′50″W
    - Saw Pit Branch 3 miles (4.8 km) upstream at an altitude of 1,065 feet (325 m), mouth at 37°18′51″N 82°56′19″W headwaters at 37°19′26″N 82°55′58″W
    - Calhoun Branch 3.125 miles (5.029 km) upstream at an altitude of 1,070 feet (330 m), mouth at 37°18′47″N 82°56′12″W headwaters at 37°19′13″N 82°55′29″W
    - Cy Branch 3.75 miles (6.04 km) upstream at an altitude of 1,090 feet (330 m)
    - Sams Branch 4 miles (6.4 km) upstream at an altitude of 1,100 feet (340 m), mouth at 37°18′09″N 82°55′34″W headwaters at 37°17′53″N 82°56′01″W
    - Reynolds Fork (or Runnells Fork) 4.625 miles (7.443 km) upstream at an altitude of 1,125 feet (343 m), mouth at 37°18′10″N 82°55′07″W
  - Left Fork at an altitude of 1,015 feet (309 m)
    - Owens Branch 0.875 miles (1.408 km) upstream at an altitude of 1,020 feet (310 m), mouth at 37°20′42″N 82°58′35″W headwaters at 37°21′38″N 82°58′36″W
    - Possum Trot Branch 2.25 miles (3.62 km) upstream at an altitude of 1,040 feet (320 m), mouth at 37°20′52″N 82°57′22″W headwaters at 37°22′04″N 82°56′53″W
    - Mill Creek 2.5 miles (4.0 km) upstream at an altitude of 1,045 feet (319 m), mouth at 37°20′50″N 82°57′00″W headwaters at 37°19′07″N 82°55′01″W
    - Jones Fork 4 miles (6.4 km) upstream at an altitude of 1,080 feet (330 m), mouth at 37°21′20″N 82°55′36″W headwaters at 37°22′40″N 82°54′42″W
    - Nealy Branch 4.375 miles (7.041 km) upstream at an altitude of 1,090 feet (330 m), mouth at 37°21′05″N 82°55′18″W
    - Alum Cave Branch 4.75 miles (7.64 km) upstream at an altitude of 1,115 feet (340 m), mouth at 37°20′47″N 82°55′08″W headwaters at 37°20′11″N 82°53′51″W

The KGS Fourth Report recorded Jones Fork as a left branch of Left Fork, and Nealy Branch and Alum Cave Branches as direct tributaries of Left Fork; however some modern maps have erased the name Jones Fork and switched Left Fork to its place, giving the KGS-reported route of Left Fork proper the name Watts Fork.

=== Before Knott County ===
The Cornett's Valley post office was established on October 12, 1854, by postmaster Samuel Cornett, and was the first post office in the area. Peyton M. Duke took over as postmaster in February 1861, with the new name Cornett's Mill. It closed in October 1863. Duke reestablished it on February 17, 1874, as McPherson, to serve Cornett's mill, several families, and a general merchanise store owned by Lewis Hays. Lewis Hays was also one of its postmasters.

It is not certain where the name McPherson came from. Two possibilities are that it was named after James Birdseye McPherson and (as suggested by local Kentucky historian R. Lee Stewart) that it was named for a USPS department official.

At the foundation of Hindman, it became Hindman post office, after the city, on October 7, 1884, with postmaster Franklin Pierce "Chick" Allen.

=== In Knott County ===
The Brinkley post office was established on September 29, 1892, by postmaster Randolph Adams. It was originally at the head of Trace Branch, but in 1913 moved 1 mile (1.6 km) downstream and proceeded to be located at several places in the vicinity. It closed in June 1993.

The Ivis post office was established on March 21, 1902, by postmaster Laura A. Hammons. It was originally located at the mouth of Trace Fork; moved 0.3 miles (0.48 km) east in 1912, placing it roughly midway between Hindman and Mallie; and then in 1933 moved 0.75 miles (1.21 km) further east to the mouth of Calhoun Branch. It closed in 1956.

In 1918, Joseph Childress had a mine at Right Fork, 0.25 miles (0.40 km) upstream. Henry Magyard had a mine at Perkins Branch, 0.125 miles (0.201 km) upstream, as did Daniel Hays, 0.25 miles (0.40 km) upstream, and Albert Madden, 0.75 miles (1.21 km) upstream. Jack Sturgill's mine was on a minor fork of Perkins, 0.5 miles (0.80 km) upstream, and Benjamin Everidge's on another Perkins minor fork, 1.5 miles (2.4 km) upstream.

Jasper Baker's mine was on Baker Branch, and Wiley Parks's mine was on a minor fork of Parks Branch, 0.375 miles (0.604 km) upstream.

On Cave Branch, John Fugate had a mine 0.5 miles (0.80 km) upstream, and Joseph Parley one 1.5 miles (2.4 km) upstream.

Wesley Hays's mine was 2 miles (3.2 km) upstream on Right Fork itself. Joseph Pigmans's was on a minor branch of Right Fork, 2.375 miles (3.822 km) upstream. N. Craft's mine was also on Right Fork, 4.5 miles (7.2 km) upstream.

Along Trace Fork, Grant Smith had a mine 0.25 miles (0.40 km) upstream and A. J. Smith a mine 0.375 miles (0.604 km) upstream; with Shade Stacy's mine being on a minor fork of Trace 0.875 miles (1.408 km) upstream, and William Mullins's mine on another minor fork 1.125 miles (1.811 km) upstream. Randolph Adams's mine was 0.125 miles (0.201 km) upstream on the Right Fork of Trace Fork.

Trace Fork is the route of Kentucky Route 160, over a gap (altitude 1,550 feet (470 m)) leading to Irishman Creek.

E. H. Hammond had a mine on Saw Pit Branch, 0.25 miles (0.40 km) upstream; and J. Jones on Calhoun Branch, 0.25 miles (0.40 km) upstream. On two minor forks of Sams branch, J. M. Pigman had a mine 0.25 miles (0.40 km) upstream, and E. Short had one 0.375 miles (0.604 km) upstream.

William Hodge's mine was on a minor branch of Reynolds Fork, 0.25 miles (0.40 km) upstream, with W. T. Campbell's mine on another minor branch, 0.625 miles (1.006 km) upstream. W. Reynolds's mine was 0.5 miles (0.80 km) upstream on Reynolds itself.

W. H. Pratt's mine was 0.25 miles (0.40 km) upstream on Possum Trot Branch. I. Thacker's was on a minor fork of Mill Creek, 0.75 miles (1.21 km) upstream; R. B. Tate's was on another minor fork of Mill, 2.25 miles (3.62 km) upstream; and William Cox's mine was 2.375 miles (3.822 km) upstream on Mill itself.

George Tuft had a mine on Jones Fork, 0.875 miles (1.408 km) upstream.

G. C. Childress's mine was on a minor branch of Left Fork, 5 miles (8.0 km) upstream. Silas Watts's mine was 5.375 miles (8.650 km) upstream on Left Fork itself, and Squire Watts's mine 6 miles (9.7 km) upstream.

==== Mallie ====
The Mallie post office was established on April 24, 1895, by postmaster Thomas J. Craft. Although it has been suggested that it was named after Craft's daughter, she was not born until 1897. It was, and still is, located at the head of Right Fork, and has over the years been at several sites in the vicinity.

==== Leburn ====
The Leburn post office was established on July 26, 1908, by postmaster Minta Pratt. It was at the mouth of Mill Creek. It moved 0.4 miles (0.64 km) west some time before 1911, to the mouth of Possumtrot Branch, where it still exists today.

==== Garner ====
The Garner post office was established in 1936 by postmaster Mollie Gayhart. She had wanted either of the names Mollie or Farley. It was named after John Nance Garner. It was, and still is, at the mouth of what used to be Alum Cave Branch, but whose downstream end is now Watts Creek.

== Early settlers ==
Samuel Cornett was the son of Revolutionary soldier William Cornett and Mary Everidge Cornett. His wife Polly Adams came from the Adams settlement at the headwaters of the Kentucky River. It's not known exactly when he arrived at The Forks of Troublesome; but when he did he built the aforementioned watermill and two-storey log house.

Solomon Everidge, nicknamed "The Granddaddy of Troublesome", was a later settler, along with Peyton Duke from North Carolina.

The Hays family comprised Captain Anderson Hays, his wife Rachel Sizemore Hays, and Lewis Hays, their son. Anderson Hays was born in Lackey, and had been a Confederate soldier. He settled on what was then known as Hays Creek, 1 mile (1.6 km) upstream from The Forks, building a watermill. Lewis was later to marry Solomon's daughter Margaret.

By the time of the establishment of Knotts County, there were also a few farmers and businessmen, including Franklin Pierce "Chick" Allen and Robert Bates. Allen married Bates's daughter Mary. Bates himself had large landholdings at The Forks and was one of the principal people responsible for the creation of Knott County, earning him the nickname "The Father of Knott County". He planned Hindman alongside attorneys T. Y. Fitzpatrick of Whitesburg and Fielding Johnson of Carrs Fork and was a member of the Kentucky House of Representatives.

On 1885-07-08 the Louisville Commercial characterized The Forks as "nothing [...] but two or three log houses not grouped together with any view of making a beginning for a town" with "vast forests exist[ing] in every direction". "A road extends to Whitesburg [...];", it continued, "another to Hazard [...], a third to Jackson [...] and one going to Prestonburg".

== See also ==
- List of rivers of Kentucky

== Sources ==
- Hodge, James Michael (1918). Coals of the North Fork of Kentucky River in Perry and Portions of Breathitt and Knott Counties. Reports of the Kentucky Geological Survey 4th series 1912–1918. Vol. 3. Frankfort, Kentucky: The State Journal Company. (Coals of the North Fork of Kentucky River in Perry and Portions of Breathitt and Knott Counties at the Internet Archive)
- Rennick, Robert M. (2000). "Knott County — Post Offices". County Histories of Kentucky (237). Morehead State University.
- Scalf, Henry Preston (2000). "The Rising Tide". Kentucky's Last Frontier. The Overmountain Press. ISBN 9781570721656.
