= Wolfpen Creek (Kansas) =

Stream in Bourbon and Allen County, Kansas, U.S.

Coordinates: 37.8033745°N 95.0621971°W

Wolfpen Creek is a stream in Bourbon and Allen counties, in the U.S. state of Kansas.

Wolfpen Creek was named for the great number of wolves seen there by early settlers.

== See also ==
- List of rivers of Kansas
