= Hindman, Kentucky =

- City
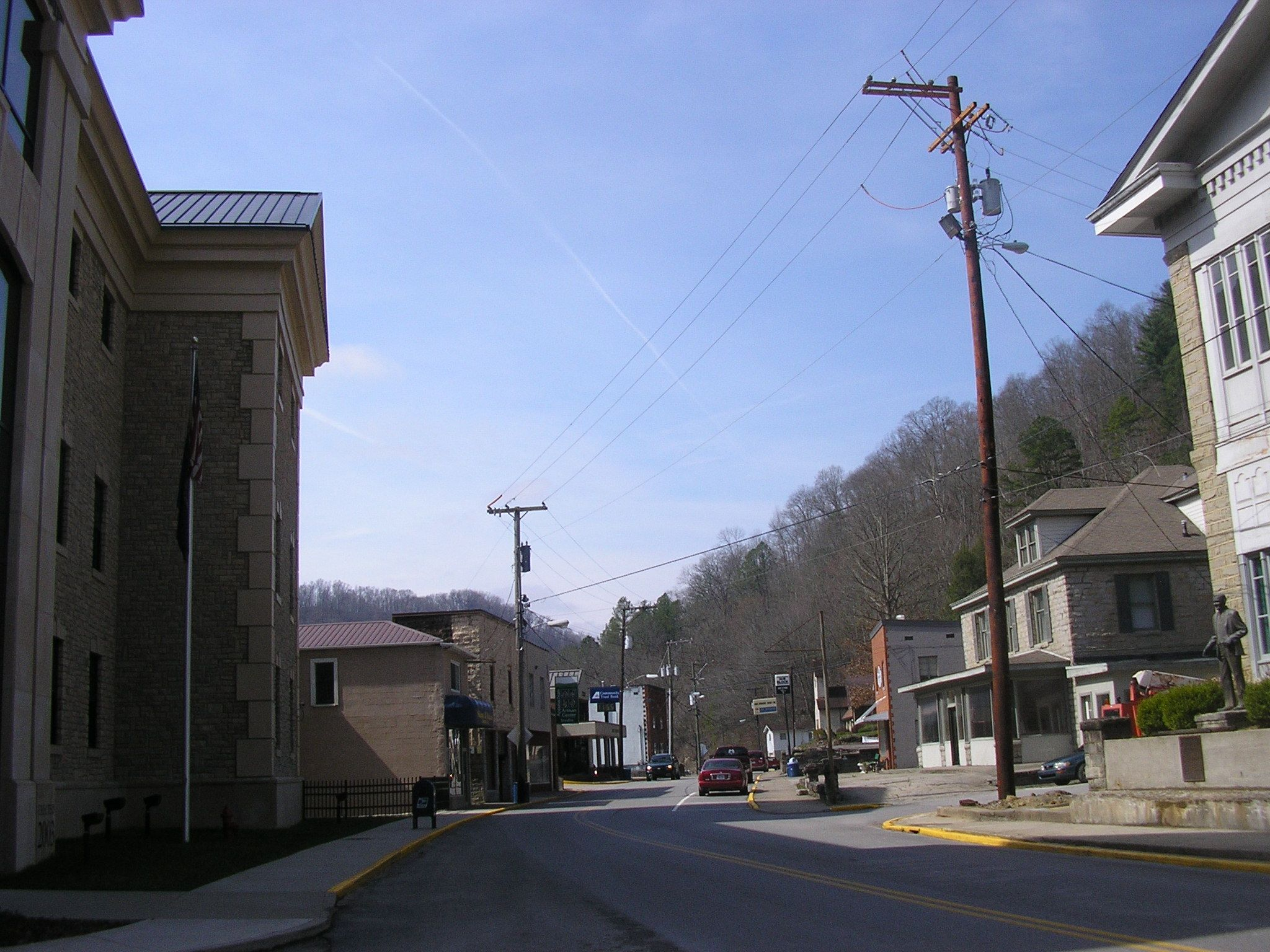
- Main Street

- Location in Knott County, Kentucky
- Coordinates: 37°20′09″N 82°58′50″W
- Country: United States
- State: Kentucky
- County: Knott
- Incorporated: March 23, 1886
- Named for: Lt. Gov. James Hindman

Government
  - Type: Mayor-Council
  - Mayor: Patricia Hall

Area
  - Total: 3.11 sq mi (8.06 km^{2})
  - Land: 3.11 sq mi (8.06 km^{2})
  - Water: 0 sq mi (0.00 km^{2})
- Elevation: 1,120 ft (340 m)

Population (2020)
  - Total: 701
  - Density: 225.4/sq mi (87.01/km^{2})
- Time zone: UTC-5 (Eastern (EST))
  - Summer (DST): UTC-4 (EDT)
- ZIP code: 41822
- Area code: 606
- FIPS code: 21-37108
- GNIS feature ID: 494291

Hindman (locally /ˈhaɪndmən/) is a home rule-class city in, and the county seat of, Knott County, Kentucky, in the United States. The population was 701 at the 2020 U.S. census.

== Geography ==
Hindman is located just west of the center of Knott County at 37°20′14″N 82°58′52″W (37.337174, -82.981147). It sits in the valley of Troublesome Creek, at the junction of its Left Fork and Right Fork. Kentucky Routes 160 and 550 pass through the center of town, and Kentucky Route 80, a four-lane highway, passes just north of the city limits. KY 80 leads northeast 29 miles (47 km) to Prestonsburg and southwest 16 miles (26 km) to the outskirts of Hazard.

According to the United States Census Bureau, Hindman has a total area of 3.1 square miles (8.1 km^{2}), all land. Via Troublesome Creek, the city is within the watershed of the Kentucky River.

== History ==
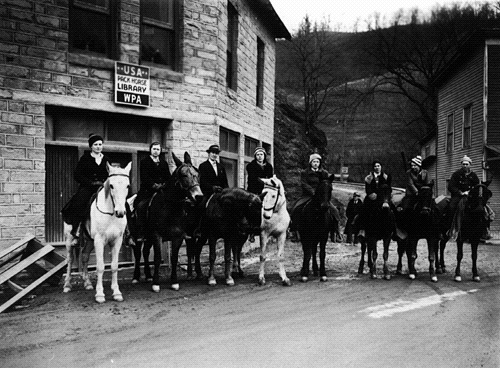
Book carriers from the Pack Horse Library Project.

Before Hindman was established, the area was known as The Forks of Troublesome.

The land for the town was provided by local landowner and postmaster Peyton Duke, but Hindman was named in honor of James Hindman, who was the lieutenant governor when the town was founded in 1884 to serve as the seat of government for the newly formed Knott County.

Early town politics included conflicts between the early settlers of The Forks, with fights between factions led by Anderson Hays and Clabe Jones in which several people were killed, including one where Clabe and supporters were barricaded in the Hindman jail and Hays and supporters were across the street in a log house.

Education in early Hindman was initially provided by George Clark from Greenup County, with the Hindman Settlement School founded in 1902, thanks to money raised by early settler Solomon Everidge (who was 80 years old at the time), and education provided by the Woman’s Christian Temperance Movement (WCTU). Everidge gifted 2 acres (0.81 ha) of his own land, which was combined with Clarke's existing schoolhouse and the purchase of another 1 acre (0.40 ha). In the first year of the Settlement School it had 162 pupils.

The schoolhouse burned down 3 times in the school's first decade, once in November 1905, again in November 1906, and the third time in 1910. After the third fire, the teachers left for Lexington, Ky., but were persuaded to return, with the school reconstructed in August 1912.j

Hindman was served by a pack horse library, which opened in 1935.

=== 2022 flood ===
On July 28, 2022, historic flooding impacted Eastern Kentucky with Hindman being one of the hardest hit communities. Of the more than 40 people who died from the floods; 22 were in Knott County. Search and rescue operations continued for days.

The city of Hindman was particularly hard hit. The mayor at the time, Tracy Niece, was quoted as saying that the flooding was the worst he had ever seen.

== Demographics ==
Historical population
Census	Pop.	Note	%±
1900	331		—
1910	370		11.8%
1920	467		26.2%
1930	508		8.8%
1940	625		23.0%
1950	521		−16.6%
1960	793		52.2%
1970	808		1.9%
1980	876		8.4%
1990	798		−8.9%
2000	787		−1.4%
2010	777		−1.3%
2020	701		−9.8%
U.S. Decennial Census

As of the census of 2000, there were 787 people, 356 households, and 220 families residing in the city. The population density was 232.5 inhabitants per square mile (89.8/km^{2}). There were 415 housing units at an average density of 122.6 per square mile (47.3/km^{2}). The racial makeup of the city was 97.59% White, 0.38% Native American, 0.38% from other races, and 1.65% from two or more races. Hispanic or Latino of any race were 1.27% of the population.

There were 356 households, out of which 31.2% had children under the age of 18 living with them, 41.3% were married couples living together, 18.8% had a female householder with no husband present, and 38.2% were non-families. 36.0% of all households were made up of individuals, and 15.7% had someone living alone who was 65 years of age or older. The average household size was 2.19 and the average family size was 2.87.

In the city, the population was spread out, with 25.3% under the age of 18, 10.7% from 18 to 24, 25.4% from 25 to 44, 22.7% from 45 to 64, and 15.9% who were 65 years of age or older. The median age was 37 years. For every 100 females, there were 83.4 males. For every 100 females age 18 and over, there were 77.6 males.

The median income for a household in the city was $14,511, and the median income for a family was $21,806. Males had a median income of $31,477 versus $21,979 for females. The per capita income for the city was $11,637. About 32.0% of families and 38.9% of the population were below the poverty line, including 49.7% of those under age 18 and 22.2% of those age 65 or over.

== Arts and culture ==
Gingerbread Festival is an annual three-day festival in early September to celebrate community and Appalachian culture.

In Paintsville native Tyler Childers' song, "Hard Times," he makes reference to the town of Hindman in regards to work he's gotten word is available.

== Education ==
Hindman has a lending library, the Knott County Public Library.

== Notable people ==
- David Tolliver, musician; member of country band Halfway to Hazard
- Carl D. Perkins – American politician (1912–1984)
- The McLain Family Band – American bluegrass band
- Brit Taylor, musician
- Cherlynn Stevenson, a member of the Kentucky House of Representatives from 2019 to 2025.
