= Alice Spencer Geddes Lloyd =

American social reformer (1876–1962)

- Born: November 13, 1876; Athol, Massachusetts
- Died: September 4, 1962 (aged 85); Pippa Passes, Kentucky
- Education: Chauncey Hall; Radcliffe College
- Occupations: Social reformer, journalist, educator
- Spouse: Arthur Lloyd
- Parent(s): William E. Geddes; Ella (Ainsworth) Geddes

Alice Spencer Geddes Lloyd (November 13, 1876 – September 4, 1962) was an American social reformer who founded Alice Lloyd College in Pippa Passes, Kentucky. She worked as a writer, editor, and educator. She supported women's suffrage and was a freethinker.

== Biography ==
Little is known about Alice Spencer Geddes' early life as per her own design; the author and educator was known to reject any questions on the subject leaving it shrouded in mystery. Alice Spencer Geddes was born in Athol, Massachusetts, on November 13, 1876, to parents William E. Geddes and Ella Mary Bowker Geddes. The family would end up moving to Boston not five years later, where they would stay until Alice Geddes would move to New Hampshire in 1914. She would later study at Radcliffe College dropping out twice; the first in 1896 and the second in 1900. In 1898 Alice would begin working as a journalist for the Cambridge Chronicle, publishing a supplement to the newspaper titled Woman's Column, the first of which would be included in the November 26, 1898 edition. The article would receive such positive response from both readers and the editors alike that the Woman's Column would become a permanent supplemental section in the newspaper titled The Woman's Chronicle, curating content made by women and for women.

In 1903 she purchased the publication The Cambridge Press, partnering with two friends to give the publication a drastic update and aggressively marketing it to provide a "frank and free criticism" of events of local interest. Acting as both publisher and editor The Cambridge Press would be known as the first publication in America to feature an all-female staff, though ultimately it would be permanently suspended by June 1904. It would be during this time that she would meet Andrew Lloyd, the then advertising manager of The Cambridge Press, and the pair would later marry on February 16, 1914. The couple, in addition to Ella Geddes, would spend a brief time living in New Hampshire where they were active in their community and frequently in the news for their good deeds. During this period, Alice Geddes Lloyd would devote a portion of her time to the children of their community, improving their education by offering free readings and starting a free library at her home. This marked the beginning of her social activism, and highlighted her dedication to improving the lives of the children and impoverished individuals in her town of Gilmanton, as well as providing an example of the enduring criticism that she would face as an outside do-gooder.

Conflicts with the citizens and local leadership in Gilmanton influenced the decision of the Lloyds to move and by the fall of 1915 they had moved to Ivis, Knott County, Kentucky, with the goal of improving social and economic conditions. Their initial work involved provision of health care, educational services, and agricultural improvements to the Appalachian region, funded by donations from East Coast states. In 1917 Alice Lloyd and her mother moved to Caney Creek, where she had been offered land for a school. She separated from her husband in 1918 and remained in Knott County. She named her Caney Creek home "Pippa Passes" after a poem by Robert Browning and in honor of donors from the New England Browning Society.

Together with June Buchanan, a native of Syracuse, New York, who joined her in Kentucky in 1919, Lloyd founded 100 elementary schools throughout eastern Kentucky and opened Caney Junior College in 1923. The college offered a free education to mountain youth, who were required to promise to remain in the region or return after completing their education. There was a long waiting list for admission. Lloyd imposed strict rules on the students, including no jewelry, cosmetics, slang, or high-heeled shoes for girls and no tobacco, gambling, liquor, guns or "unauthorized meetings with the opposite sex" for boys.

Both Lloyd and Buchanan worked without pay at both education and fund-raising. Lloyd is said to have raised some $2.5 million for the college, mainly by typing and mailing fund-raising appeals. On December 7, 1955, Lloyd appeared on the This Is Your Life television show, whose host Ralph Edwards made a direct fund-raising plea on her school's behalf. In 1997, the college's director of marketing and communications at the time, Stephen Reed, told a journalist, "We've still got people on our mailing and donor list who saw the show."

Lloyd served the college until her death on September 4, 1962. After her death, the college was renamed in her honor. Miss Buchanan served at Alice Lloyd College until 1988, when she died at the age of 100, having lived to see the 1984 opening of the June Buchanan School, a K-12 school on the Alice Lloyd College campus named in her honor. A statue of Lloyd was dedicated on October 10, 2009, during a ceremony at the college.

In 2013 Alice Spencer Geddes Lloyd was resurrected by the Kentucky Humanities Council's Kentucky Chautauqua program, an educational dramatization centered around Kentuckians who have made valuable contributions.
