= List of Alpha Kappa Delta chapters =

Alpha Kappa Delta is an international honor society for sociology. It was established at the University of Southern California on November 21, 1920, and expanded to 702 chapters as of 2024. The society closed most of its active chapters in 2024, with several surviving chapters consolidating in 2023. Following are the chapters of Alpha Kappa Delta, with active chapters indicated in bold and inactive chapters and institutions are in italics.

Chapter	Charter date and range	Institution	Location	State or province	Status	Ref.
Alpha of California	November 21, 1920 – 2024	University of Southern California	Los Angeles, California	CA	Inactive	
Alpha of Wisconsin	1922–2024	University of Wisconsin–Madison	Madison, Wisconsin	WI	Inactive	
Alpha of Illinois	1923–1923	Northwestern University	Evanston, Illinois	IL	Inactive	
Alpha of Washington	1923–2024	University of Washington	Seattle, Washington	WA	Inactive	
Beta of California	1924–1924	Stanford University	Stanford, California	CA	Inactive	
Alpha of Minnesota	1925–2024	Hamline University	Saint Paul, Minnesota	MN	Inactive	
Alpha of New York	1925–2024	Cornell University	Ithaca, New York	NY	Inactive	
Alpha of Ohio	1925–2024	Miami University	Oxford, Ohio	OH	Inactive	
Alpha of Oregon	1926–2024	University of Oregon	Eugene, Oregon	OR	Inactive	
Alpha of Iowa	1926–2003	Morningside University	Sioux City, Iowa	IA	Inactive	
Alpha of Nebraska	1926–2024	University of Nebraska Omaha	Omaha, Nebraska	NE	Inactive	
Beta of Ohio	1926–2020	Ohio University	Athens, Ohio	OH	Inactive	
Alpha of Michigan	1927–2011	University of Michigan	Ann Arbor, Michigan	MI	Inactive	
Alpha of Missouri	1927–2024	University of Missouri	Columbia, Missouri	MO	Inactive	
Alpha of Texas	1928–2010	Baylor University	Waco, Texas	TX	Inactive	
Beta of Illinois	1928–2024	Loyola University Chicago	Chicago, Illinois	IL	Inactive	
Gamma of Illinois	1928–2024	University of Illinois Urbana-Champaign	Urbana, Illinois	IL	Inactive	
Beta of New York	1928–2024	Syracuse University	Syracuse, New York	NY	Inactive	
Gamma of Ohio	1929–2020	Ohio State University	Columbus, Ohio	OH	Inactive	
Gamma of California	1930–1930	Pomona College	Claremont, California	CA	Inactive	
Alpha of North Carolina	1931–2024	University of North Carolina at Chapel Hill	Chapel Hill, North Carolina	NC	Inactive	
Gamma of New York	1932–1932	New York University	New York City, New York	NY	Inactive	
Beta of Texas	1932–2021	Southern Methodist University	Dallas, Texas	TX	Inactive	
Delta of Ohio	1932–2024	Ohio Wesleyan University	Delaware, Ohio	OH	Inactive	
Beta of Missouri	1933–2024	Washington University in St. Louis	St. Louis, Missouri	MO	Inactive	
Gamma of Texas	1934–2020	University of Texas at Austin	Austin, Texas	TX	Inactive	
Epsilon of Ohio	1934–2021	University of Cincinnati	Cincinnati, Ohio	OH	Inactive	
Delta of New York	1934–2024	Brooklyn College	Brooklyn, New York	NY	Inactive	
Delta of California	1935–2022	San Diego State University	San Diego, California	CA	Inactive	
Alpha of Pennsylvania	1936–2009	University of Pittsburgh	Pittsburgh, Pennsylvania	PA	Inactive	
Alpha of Indiana	1936–2024	Indiana University Bloomington	Bloomington, Indiana	IN	Inactive	
Beta of Nebraska	1936–2024	University of Nebraska–Lincoln	Lincoln, Nebraska	NE	Inactive	
Delta of Texas	1936–2024	Texas Woman's University	Denton, Texas	TX	Inactive	
Alpha of Alabama	1938–1991	University of Alabama	Tuscaloosa, Alabama	AL	Inactive	
Beta of Wisconsin	1939–2019	Marquette University	Milwaukee, Wisconsin	WI	Inactive	
Beta of Michigan	1939–2024	Wayne State University	Detroit, Michigan	MI	Inactive	
Beta of Washington	1939–2024	Washington State University	Pullman, Washington	WA	Inactive	
Alpha of New Hampshire	1939–2024	University of New Hampshire	Durham, New Hampshire	NH	Inactive	
Alpha of Tennessee	1945–2024	Fisk University	Nashville, Tennessee	TN	Inactive	
Beta of Pennsylvania	1946–2008	Bucknell University	Lewisburg, Pennsylvania	PA	Inactive	
Alpha of South Carolina	1946–2019	Winthrop University	Rock Hill, South Carolina	SC	Inactive	
Alpha of Georgia	1946–2024	Clark Atlanta University	Atlanta, Georgia	GA	Inactive	
Alpha of Maryland	1946–2024	University of Maryland, College Park	College Park, Maryland	MD	Inactive	
Alpha of Colorado	1947–2023	University of Denver	Denver, Colorado	CO	Inactive	
Delta of Illinois	1947–2024	Southern Illinois University Carbondale	Carbondale, Illinois	IL	Inactive	
Epsilon of New York	1947–2024	St. Lawrence University	Canton, New York	NY	Inactive	
Beta of Indiana	1948–2024	DePauw University	Greencastle, Indiana	IN	Inactive	
Gamma of Pennsylvania	1949–2018	Pennsylvania State University	University Park, Pennsylvania	PA	Inactive	
Alpha of Oklahoma	1949–2019	University of Tulsa	Tulsa, Oklahoma	OK	Inactive	
Alpha of Florida	1949–2024	Florida State University	Tallahassee, Florida	FL	Inactive	
Delta of Iowa	1950–2019	University of Iowa	Iowa City, Iowa	IA	Inactive	
Beta of North Carolina	1950–2023	North Carolina State University	Raleigh, North Carolina	NC	Inactive	
Alpha of Arkansas	1950–2024	University of Arkansas	Fayetteville, Arkansas	AR	Inactive	
Beta of Florida	1950–2024	University of Florida	Gainesville, Florida	FL	Inactive	
Gamma of Florida	1950–2024	University of Miami	Coral Gables, Florida	FL	Inactive	
Beta of Iowa	1950–2024	Drake University	Des Moines, Iowa	IA	Inactive	
Gamma of Iowa	1950–2024	Iowa State University	Ames, Iowa	IA	Inactive	
Alpha of West Virginia	1950–2024	Marshall University	Huntington, West Virginia	WV	Inactive	
Gamma of North Carolina	1952–2016	North Carolina Central University	Durham, North Carolina	NC	Inactive	
Alpha of Louisiana	1952–2017	Tulane University	New Orleans, Louisiana	LA	Inactive	
Beta of Louisiana	1952–2023	Louisiana State University	Baton Rouge, Louisiana	LA	Inactive	
Zeta of New York	1952–2023	University at Buffalo	Buffalo, New York	NY	Inactive	
Alpha of District of Columbia	1952–2024	George Washington University	Washington, D.C.	DC	Inactive	
Beta of District of Columbia	1952–2024	Howard University	Washington, D.C.	DC	Inactive	
Alpha of Kansas	1952–2024	Wichita State University	Wichita, Kansas	KS	Inactive	
Alpha of Massachusetts	1952–2024	Tufts University	Medford, Massachusetts	MA	Inactive	
Gamma of Michigan	1953–2024	Michigan State University	East Lansing, Michigan	MI	Inactive	
Alpha of Arizona	1953–2024	University of Arizona	Tucson, Arizona	AZ	Inactive	
Beta of Arizona	1953–2024	Arizona State University	Tempe, Arizona	AZ	Inactive	
Eta of Ohio	1953–2024	Bowling Green State University	Bowling Green, Ohio	OH	Inactive	
Gamma of Indiana	1954–2017	Purdue University	West Lafayette, Indiana	IN	Inactive	
Alpha of Mississippi	1954–2024	Mississippi State University	Mississippi State, Mississippi	MS	Inactive	
Theta of Ohio	1954–2024	Kent State University	Kent, Ohio	OH	Inactive	
Alpha of Delaware	1954–2024	University of Delaware	Newark, Delaware	DE	Inactive	
Epsilon of California	1955–1955	Occidental College	Los Angeles, California	CA	Inactive	
Zeta of Texas	1956–1956	University of Texas at Dallas	Richardson, Texas	TX	Inactive	
Epsilon of Texas	1956–2016	University of Houston	Houston, Texas	TX	Inactive	
Beta of Georgia	1956–2024	Emory University	Atlanta, Georgia	GA	Inactive	
Beta of Minnesota of Minnesota	1957–2004	University of Minnesota	Minneapolis, Minnesota	MN	Inactive	
Zeta of California	1957–2024	California State University, Fresno	Fresno, California	CA	Inactive	
Eta of California	1957–2024	Whittier College	Whittier, California	CA	Inactive	
Alpha of Montana	1958–2024	University of Montana	Missoula, Montana	MT	Inactive	
Beta of Oklahoma	1958–2024	University of Oklahoma	Norman, Oklahoma	OK	Inactive	
Delta of Pennsylvania	1958–2024	Duquesne University	Pittsburgh, Pennsylvania	PA	Inactive	
Eta of Texas	1958–2024	Sam Houston State University	Huntsville, Texas	TX	Inactive	
Alpha of Kentucky	1959–2024	University of Kentucky	Lexington, Kentucky	KY	Inactive	
Alpha of Rhode Island	1959–2024	University of Rhode Island	Kingston, Rhode Island	RI	Inactive	
Theta of Texas	1959–2024	University of North Texas	Denton, Texas	TX	Inactive	
Epsilon of Illinois	1960–2023	Northern Illinois University	DeKalb, Illinois	IL	Inactive	
Theta of California	1960–2024	San Jose State University	San Jose, California	CA	Inactive	
Iota of California	1960–2024	California State University, Los Angeles	Los Angeles, California	CA	Inactive	
Beta of Colorado	1961–2019	University of Colorado Boulder	Boulder, Colorado	CO	Inactive	
Iota of Texas	1961–2023	Texas A&M University	College Station, Texas	TX	Inactive	
Beta of Kansas	1961–2024	University of Kansas	Lawrence, Kansas	KS	Inactive	
Epsilon of Iowa	1962–1962	Grinnell College	Grinnell, Iowa	IA	Inactive	
Alpha of Utah	1962–2010	Brigham Young University	Provo, Utah	UT	Inactive	
Epsilon of Pennsylvania	1962–2017	University of Pennsylvania	Philadelphia, Pennsylvania	PA	Inactive	
Alpha of Virginia	1962–2024	Virginia State University	Petersburg, Virginia	VA	Inactive	
Eta of New York	1962–2024	Adelphi University	Garden City, New York	NY	Inactive	
Lambda of California	1963–1963	United States International University	San Diego, California	CA	Inactive	
Zeta of Pennsylvania	1963–1963	Temple University	Philadelphia, Pennsylvania	PA	Inactive	
Delta of Indiana	1963–2012	Indiana State University	Terre Haute, Indiana	IN	Inactive	
Gamma of Wisconsin	1963–2017	University of Wisconsin–Oshkosh	Oshkosh, Wisconsin	WI	Inactive	
Kappa of California	1963–2024	California State University, Northridge	Northridge, Los Angeles, California	CA	Inactive	
Kappa of Texas	1963–2024	East Texas A&M University	Commerce, Texas	TX	Inactive	
Iota of Ohio	1963–2024	Case Western Reserve University	Cleveland, Ohio	OH	Inactive	
Delta of Wisconsin	1964–1964	Carroll University	Waukesha, Wisconsin	WI	Inactive	
Mu of California	1964–1964	San Francisco State University	San Francisco, California	CA	Inactive	
Gamma of Louisiana	1964–2009	Southern University	Baton Rouge, Louisiana	LA	Inactive	
Alpha of New Jersey	1964–2010	Rutgers University–Newark	Newark, New Jersey	NJ	Inactive	
Beta of Massachusetts	1964–2014	Northeastern University	Boston, Massachusetts	MA	Inactive	
Lambda of Ohio	1964–2015	University of Toledo	Toledo, Ohio	OH	Inactive	
Theta of New York	1964–2019	St. John's University	Jamaica, Queens, New York City, New York	NY	Inactive	
Gamma of Colorado	1964–2024	Colorado State University	Fort Collins, Colorado	CO	Inactive	
Gamma of Missouri	1964–2024	Missouri State University	Springfield, Missouri	MO	Inactive	
Alpha of North Dakota	1964–2024	University of North Dakota	Grand Forks, North Dakota	ND	Inactive	
Kappa of Ohio	1964–2024	Denison University	Granville, Ohio	OH	Inactive	
Gamma of Washington	1965–2008	Eastern Washington University	Cheney, Washington	WA	Inactive	
Delta of Michigan	1965–2012	University of Detroit Mercy	Detroit, Michigan	MI	Inactive	
Epsilon of Wisconsin	1965–2018	Mount Mary University	Milwaukee, Wisconsin	WI	Inactive	
Gamma of Georgia	1965–2024	University of Georgia	Athens, Georgia	GA	Inactive	
Epsilon of Michigan	1965–2024	Western Michigan University	Kalamazoo, Michigan	MI	Inactive	
Gamma of Minnesota	1965–2024	Macalester College	Saint Paul, Minnesota	MN	Inactive	
Lambda of Texas	1965–2024	Texas Christian University	Fort Worth, Texas	TX	Inactive	
Iota of New York	1965–2024	Fordham University	Bronx, New York City, New York	NY	Inactive	
Delta of Georgia	1966–2009	Georgia State University	Atlanta, Georgia	GA	Inactive	
Zeta of Illinois	1966–2024	Illinois Wesleyan University	Bloomington, Illinois	IL	Inactive	
Delta of North Carolina	1966–2024	East Carolina University	Greenville, North Carolina	NC	Inactive	
Beta of Tennessee	1966–2024	University of Tennessee	Knoxville, Tennessee	TN	Inactive	
Kappa of New York	1967–2021	University at Albany, SUNY	Albany, New York	NY	Inactive	
Gamma of Tennessee	1967–2024	University of Memphis	Memphis, Tennessee	TN	Inactive	
Mu of Texas	1967–2024	Texas Southern University	Houston, Texas	TX	Inactive	
Beta of Kentucky	1967–2024	Western Kentucky University	Bowling Green, Kentucky	KY	Inactive	
Delta of Louisiana	1968–1968	Grambling State University	Grambling, Louisiana	LA	Inactive	
Beta of Montana	1968–1968	Montana State University	Bozeman, Montana	MT	Inactive	
Gamma of Virginia	1968–2010	Norfolk State University	Norfolk, Virginia	VA	Inactive	
Nu of Texas	1968–2022	Stephen F. Austin State University	Nacogdoches, Texas	TX	Inactive	
Alpha of Maine	1968–2024	University of Maine	Orono, Maine	ME	Inactive	
Gamma of Massachusetts	1968–2024	Boston University	Boston, Massachusetts	MA	Inactive	
Delta of Missouri	1968–2024	University of Central Missouri	Warrensburg, Missouri	MO	Inactive	
Beta of Virginia	1968–2024	College of William & Mary	Williamsburg, Virginia	VA	Inactive	
Nu of California	1968–2024	California State University, Fullerton	Fullerton, California	CA	Inactive	
Mu of Ohio	1968–2024	University of Akron	Akron, Ohio	OH	Inactive	
Epsilon of Indiana	1969–2024	University of Notre Dame	Notre Dame, Indiana	IN	Inactive	
Delta of Massachusetts	1969–2024	College of the Holy Cross	Worcester, Massachusetts	MA	Inactive	
Gamma of Oklahoma	1969–2024	Oklahoma State University	Stillwater, Oklahoma	OK	Inactive	
Nu of Ohio	1970–1970	Youngstown State University	Youngstown, Ohio	OH	Inactive	
Gamma of Kansas	1970–2017	Pittsburg State University	Pittsburg, Kansas	KS	Inactive	
Epsilon of Massachusetts	1970–2019	Boston College	Chestnut Hill, Massachusetts	MA	Inactive	
Delta of Virginia	1970–2024	Virginia Commonwealth University	Richmond, Virginia	VA	Inactive	
Xi of California	1970–2024	California State University, Dominguez Hills	Carson, California	CA	Inactive	
Eta of Wisconsin	1970–2024	University of Wisconsin–Whitewater	Whitewater, Wisconsin	WI	Inactive	
Beta of Alabama	1971–2024	Auburn University	Auburn, Alabama	AL	Inactive	
Gamma of Kentucky	1971–2014	Eastern Kentucky University	Richmond, Kentucky	KY	Inactive	
Epsilon of Missouri	1971–2017	University of Missouri–Kansas City	Kansas City, Missouri	MO	Inactive	
Beta of West Virginia	1971–2022	West Virginia University	Morgantown, West Virginia	WV	Inactive	
Omicron of California	1971–2024	California State University, East Bay	Hayward, California	CA	Inactive	
Lambda of New York	1971–2024	Hofstra University	Hempstead, New York	NY	Inactive	
Beta of South Carolina	1971–2024	Clemson University	Clemson, South Carolina	SC	Inactive	
Eta of Illinois	1971–2024	Eastern Illinois University	Charleston, Illinois	IL	Inactive	
Eta of Massachusetts	1971–2024	University of Massachusetts Boston	Boston, Massachusetts	MA	Inactive	
Mu of New Jersey	1971–2024	Montclair State University	Montclair, New Jersey	NJ	Inactive	
Mu of New York	1971–2024	Lehman College	Bronx, New York City, New York	NY	Inactive	
Nu of New York	1971–2024	State University of New York at Cortland	Cortland, New York	NY	Inactive	
Beta of New Jersey	1972–2013	Fairleigh Dickinson University–Teaneck	Teaneck, New Jersey	NJ	Inactive	
Eta of Iowa	1972–2020	University of Northern Iowa	Cedar Falls, Iowa	IA	Inactive	
Zeta of Indiana	1972–2024	Ball State University	Muncie, Indiana	IN	Inactive	
Beta of Maryland	1972–2024	Bowie State University	Bowie, Maryland	MD	Inactive	
Gamma of New Jersey	1972–2024	William Paterson University	Wayne, New Jersey	NJ	Inactive	
Pi of California	1972–2024	California State University, San Bernardino	San Bernardino, California	CA	Inactive	
Xi of Ohio	1972–2024	University of Dayton	Dayton, Ohio	OH	Inactive	
Xi of Texas	1972–2024	Texas State University	San Marcos, Texas	TX	Inactive	
Omicron of New York	1973–2004	College of New Rochelle	New Rochelle, New York	NY	Inactive	
Gamma of Alabama	1973–2006	Alabama State University	Montgomery, Alabama	AL	Inactive	
Delta of Tennessee	1973–2008	East Tennessee State University	Johnson City, Tennessee	TN	Inactive	
Delta of Minnesota	1973–2016	Minnesota State University, Mankato	Mankato, Minnesota	MN	Inactive	
Omicron of Ohio	1973–2019	Cleveland State University	Cleveland, Ohio	OH	Inactive	
Eta of Indiana	1973–2023	Indiana University South Bend	South Bend, Indiana	IN	Inactive	
Beta of Mississippi	1973–2024	University of Mississippi	University, Mississippi	MS	Inactive	
Omicron of Texas	1973–2024	University of Texas at Arlington	Arlington, Texas	TX	Inactive	
Epsilon of Virginia	1973–2024	Virginia Tech	Blacksburg, Virginia	VA	Inactive	
Xi of New York	1973–2024	St. Francis College	Brooklyn, New York	NY	Inactive	
Sigma of New York	1974–1974	Baruch College	New York City, New York	NY	Inactive	
Eta of Pennsylvania	1974–2005	Cedar Crest College	Allentown, Pennsylvania	PA	Inactive	
Zeta of Virginia	1974–2011	Old Dominion University	Norfolk, Virginia	VA	Inactive	
Zeta of North Carolina	1974–2019	North Carolina A&T State University	Greensboro, North Carolina	NC	Inactive	
Iota of Pennsylvania	1974–2020	La Salle University	Philadelphia, Pennsylvania	PA	Inactive	
Beta of South Dakota	1974–2021	South Dakota State University	Brookings, South Dakota	SD	Inactive	
Beta of Maine	1974–2022	University of Southern Maine	Portland, Maine	ME	Inactive	
Epsilon of New Jersey	1974–2022	Rider University	Lawrence Township, New Jersey	NJ	Inactive	
Theta of Wisconsin	1974–2022	University of Wisconsin–Eau Claire	Eau Claire, Wisconsin	WI	Inactive	
Gamma of District of Columbia	1974–2023	Catholic University of America	Washington, D.C.	DC	Inactive	
Alpha of South Dakota	1974–2023	University of South Dakota	Vermillion, South Dakota	SD	Inactive	
Delta of Florida	1974–2024	University of Central Florida	Orlando, Florida	FL	Inactive	
Zeta of Michigan	1974–2024	Albion College	Albion, Michigan	MI	Inactive	
Delta of New Jersey	1974–2024	Rowan University	Glassboro, New Jersey	NJ	Inactive	
Zeta of New Jersey	1974–2024	New Jersey City University	Jersey City, New Jersey	NJ	Inactive	
Epsilon of North Carolina	1974–2024	Appalachian State University	Boone, North Carolina	NC	Inactive	
Theta of North Carolina	1974–2024	Western Carolina University	Cullowhee, North Carolina	NC	Inactive	
Theta of Pennsylvania	1974–2024	Indiana University of Pennsylvania	Indiana, Pennsylvania	PA	Inactive	
Pi of New York	1974–2024	Wagner College	Staten Island, New York	NY	Inactive	
Rho of New York	1974–2024	State University of New York at Potsdam	Potsdam, New York	NY	Inactive	
Eta of North Carolina	1974–2024	University of North Carolina at Charlotte	Charlotte, North Carolina	NC	Inactive	
Tau of New York	1975–1975	Long Island University C.W. Post Campus	Brookville, New York	NY	Inactive	
Iota of North Carolina	1975–2016	Winston-Salem State University	Winston-Salem, North Carolina	NC	Inactive	
Theta of Indiana	1975–2024	Purdue University Fort Wayne	Fort Wayne, Indiana	IN	Inactive	
Delta of Kentucky	1975–2024	University of Louisville	Louisville, Kentucky	KY	Inactive	
Alpha of Nevada	1975–2024	University of Nevada, Las Vegas	Las Vegas, Nevada	NV	Inactive	
Upsilon of New York	1975–2024	Le Moyne College	Syracuse, New York	NY	Inactive	
Kappa of Pennsylvania	1975–2024	Millersville University of Pennsylvania	Millersville, Pennsylvania	PA	Inactive	
Lambda of Pennsylvania	1975–2024	East Stroudsburg University of Pennsylvania	East Stroudsburg, Pennsylvania	PA	Inactive	
Rho of California	1975–2024	University of California, Los Angeles	Los Angeles, California	CA	Inactive	
Mu of Pennsylvania	1975–2024	Saint Joseph's University	Philadelphia, Pennsylvania	PA	Inactive	
Nu of Pennsylvania	1975–2024	Lincoln University	Lincoln University, Pennsylvania	PA	Inactive	
Xi of Pennsylvania	1975–2024	Albright College	Reading, Pennsylvania	PA	Inactive	
Phi of New York	1976–2018	Stony Brook University	Stony Brook, New York	NY	Inactive	
Delta of Alabama	1976–2022	Tuskegee University	Tuskegee, Alabama	AL	Inactive	
Epsilon of Louisiana	1976–2022	Centenary College of Louisiana	Shreveport, Louisiana	LA	Inactive	
Epsilon of Alabama	1976–2023	University of Alabama in Huntsville	Huntsville, Alabama	AL	Inactive	
Epsilon of Georgia	1976–2024	University of West Georgia	Carrollton, Georgia	VA	Inactive	
Beta of Rhode Island	1976–2024	Rhode Island College	Providence, Rhode Island	RI	Inactive	
Beta of Utah	1976–2024	Utah State University	Logan, Utah	UT	Inactive	
Gamma of Utah	1976–2024	Weber State University	Ogden, Utah	UT	Inactive	
Gamma of Maryland	1977–1977	University of Baltimore	Baltimore, Maryland	MD	Inactive	
Zeta of Louisiana	1977–2013	University of Louisiana at Monroe	Monroe, Louisiana	LA	Inactive	
Omicron of Pennsylvania	1977–2017	Saint Francis University	Loretto, Pennsylvania	PA	Inactive	
Zeta of Alabama	1977–2023	University of South Alabama	Mobile, Alabama	AL	Inactive	
Sigma of California	1977–2024	California State Polytechnic University, Pomona	Pomona, California	CA	Inactive	
Chi of New York	1977–2024	Russell Sage College	Troy, New York	NY	Inactive	
Gamma of South Carolina	1977–2024	University of South Carolina	Columbia, South Carolina	SC	Inactive	
Theta of Virginia	1977–2024	Christopher Newport University	Newport News, Virginia	VA	Inactive	
Iota of Massachusetts	1977–2024	Suffolk University	Boston, Massachusetts	MA	Inactive	
Pi of Ohio	1977–2024	Muskingum University	New Concord, Ohio	OH	Inactive	
Pi of Pennsylvania	1977–2024	Gettysburg College	Gettysburg, Pennsylvania	PA	Inactive	
Eta of Virginia	1977–2024	Roanoke College	Salem, Virginia	VA	Inactive	
Alpha of Connecticut	1978–1978	University of Bridgeport	Bridgeport, Connecticut	CT	Inactive	
Zeta of Iowa	1978–1978	Coe College	Cedar Rapids, Iowa	IA	Inactive	
Delta of Kansas	1978–2010	Kansas State University	Manhattan, Kansas	KS	Inactive	
Gamma of Nebraska	1978–2011	Concordia University Nebraska	Seward, Nebraska	NE	Inactive	
Lambda of North Carolina	1978–2014	University of North Carolina at Asheville	Asheville, North Carolina	NC	Inactive	
Gamma of West Virginia	1978–2016	West Virginia State University	Institute, West Virginia	WV	Inactive	
Pi of Texas	1978–2018	Midwestern State University	Wichita Falls, Texas	TX	Inactive	
Psi of New York	1978–2019	Hunter College	New York City, New York	NY	Inactive	
Sigma of Pennsylvania	1978–2020	University of Pittsburgh at Johnstown	Johnstown, Pennsylvania	PA	Inactive	
Zeta of Georgia	1978–2022	Valdosta State University	Valdosta, Georgia	GA	Inactive	
Mu of North Carolina	1978–2023	Wake Forest University	Winston-Salem, North Carolina	NC	Inactive	
Delta of District of Columbia	1978–2024	Georgetown University	Washington, D.C.	DC	Inactive	
Epsilon of Kansas	1978–2024	Fort Hays State University	Hays, Kansas	KS	Inactive	
Theta of New Jersey	1978–2024	Monmouth University	West Long Branch, New Jersey	NJ	Inactive	
Omega of New York	1978–2024	Union College	Schenectady, New York	NY	Inactive	
Alpha Beta of New York	1978–2024	Skidmore College	Saratoga Springs, New York	NY	Inactive	
Kappa of North Carolina	1978–2024	University of North Carolina at Greensboro	Greensboro, North Carolina	NC	Inactive	
Delta of South Carolina	1978–2024	Francis Marion University	Florence, South Carolina	SC	Inactive	
Beta of Connecticut	1978–2024	Central Connecticut State University	New Britain, Connecticut	CT	Inactive	
Delta of Washington	1978–2024	University of Puget Sound	Tacoma, Washington	WA	Inactive	
Eta of Alabama	1978–2024	Jacksonville State University	Jacksonville, Alabama	AL	Inactive	
Eta of New Jersey	1978–2024	Kean University	Union, New Jersey	NJ	Inactive	
Rho of Pennsylvania	1978–2024	Shippensburg University of Pennsylvania	Shippensburg, Pennsylvania	PA	Inactive	
Rho of Texas	1978–2024	Texas Tech University	Lubbock, Texas	TX	Inactive	
Upsilon of Pennsylvania	1979–2024	University of Scranton	Scranton, Pennsylvania	PA	Inactive	
Nu of North Carolina	1979–2024	University of North Carolina Wilmington	Wilmington, North Carolina	NC	Inactive	
Rho of Ohio	1979–2024	Wright State University, Dayton Campus	Dayton, Ohio	OH	Inactive	
Tau of Pennsylvania	1979–2024	West Chester University	West Chester, Pennsylvania	PA	Inactive	
Gamma of Connecticut	1980–1980	University of New Haven	West Haven, Connecticut	CT	Inactive	
Eta of Louisiana	1980–2008	Northwestern State University	Natchitoches, Louisiana	LA	Inactive	
Tau of California	1980–2012	University of California, Santa Barbara	Santa Barbara, California	CA	Inactive	
Alpha Gamma of New York	1980–2019	Queens College, City University of New York	Flushing, Queens, New York City, New York	NY	Inactive	
Theta of Illinois	1980–2024	Illinois State University	Normal, Illinois	IL	Inactive	
Delta of Maryland	1980–2024	Frostburg State University	Frostburg, Maryland	MD	Inactive	
Phi of Pennsylvania (see **Phi–Alpha–Beta of Pennsylvania**)	1980–2023	Bloomsburg University of Pennsylvania	Bloomsburg, Pennsylvania	PA	Consolidated	
Iota of Virginia	1980–2024	Longwood University	Farmville, Virginia	VA	Inactive	
Gamma of Arizona	1981–2022	Northern Arizona University	Flagstaff, Arizona	AZ	Inactive	
Epsilon of Maryland	1981–2024	Morgan State University	Baltimore, Maryland	MD	Inactive	
Kappa of Virginia	1981–2024	James Madison University	Harrisonburg, Virginia	VA	Inactive	
Iota of Illinois	1981–2024	Western Illinois University	Macomb, Illinois	IL	Inactive	
Iota of New Jersey	1981–2024	Seton Hall University	South Orange, New Jersey	NJ	Inactive	
Kappa of New Jersey	1982–2012	Fairleigh Dickinson University–Rutherford Campus	Rutherford, New Jersey	NJ	Inactive	
Iota of Indiana	1982–2022	Indiana University Northwest	Gary, Indiana	IN	Inactive	
Theta of Alabama	1982–2024	University of North Alabama	Florence, Alabama	AL	Inactive	
Kappa of Illinois	1982–2024	Concordia University Chicago	River Forest, Illinois	IL	Inactive	
Lambda of New Jersey	1982–2024	Stockton University	Pomona, New Jersey	NJ	Inactive	
Sigma of Ohio	1982–2024	Wittenberg University	Springfield, Ohio	OH	Inactive	
Epsilon of South Carolina	1982–2024	Furman University	Greenville, South Carolina	SC	Inactive	
Alpha of Vermont	1982–2024	University of Vermont	Burlington, Vermont	VT	Inactive	
Epsilon of District of Columbia	1983–2016	American University	Washington, D.C.	DC	Inactive	
Iota of Alabama	1983–2019	Spring Hill College	Mobile, Alabama	AL	Inactive	
Upsilon of California	1983–2024	University of California, Davis	Davis, California	CA	Inactive	
Delta of Colorado	1983–2024	University of Colorado Denver	Denver, Colorado	CO	Inactive	
Sigma of Texas	1983–2024	Lamar University	Beaumont, Texas	TX	Inactive	
Phi of California	1983–2024	Sonoma State University	Rohnert Park, California	CA	Inactive	
Epsilon of Florida	1984–2023	University of South Florida	Tampa, Florida	FL	Inactive	
Beta of Arkansas	1984–2024	Arkansas State University	Jonesboro, Arkansas	AR	Inactive	
Lambda of Illinois	1984–2024	Wheaton College	Wheaton, Illinois	IL	Inactive	
Alpha Delta of New York	1984–2024	State University of New York at Plattsburgh	Plattsburgh, New York	NY	Inactive	
Alpha Zeta of New York	1984–2024	State University of New York at New Paltz	New Paltz, New York	NY	Inactive	
Lambda of Virginia	1984–2024	University of Virginia	Charlottesville, Virginia	VA	Inactive	
Alpha Epsilon of New York	1984–2024	University of Mount Saint Vincent	Riverdale, Bronx, New York City, New York	NY	Inactive	
Alpha of Taiwan	1985–1985	Tunghai University	Taichung, Xitun District, Taiwan		Inactive	
Beta of Taiwan	1985–1985	National Taiwan University	Taipei, Taiwan		Inactive	
Alpha Theta of New York	1985–2008	State University of New York at Oswego	Oswego, New York	NY	Inactive	
Kappa of Alabama	1985–2014	University of Alabama at Birmingham	Birmingham, Alabama	AL	Inactive	
Mu of Illinois	1985–2015	DePaul University	Chicago, Illinois	IL	Inactive	
Delta of Oklahoma	1985–2018	Cameron University	Lawton, Oklahoma	OK	Inactive	
Delta of West Virginia	1985–2023	Shepherd University	Shepherdstown, West Virginia	WV	Inactive	
Zeta of Florida	1985–2024	Stetson University	DeLand, Florida	FL	Inactive	
Zeta of Kansas	1985–2024	Emporia State University	Emporia, Kansas	KS	Inactive	
Zeta of Maryland	1985–2024	Goucher College	Baltimore, Maryland	MD	Inactive	
Zeta of Maryland	1985–2024	Loyola University Maryland	Baltimore, Maryland	MD	Inactive	
Gamma of Mississippi	1985–2024	Millsaps College	Jackson, Mississippi	MS	Inactive	
Gamma of Mississippi	1985–2024	Tougaloo College	Jackson, Mississippi	MS	Inactive	
Alpha Eta of New York	1985–2024	State University of New York at Geneseo	Geneseo, New York	NY	Inactive	
Alpha Iota of New York	1985–2024	State University of New York at Fredonia	Fredonia, New York	NY	Inactive	
Chi of Pennsylvania	1985–2024	Elizabethtown College	Elizabethtown, Pennsylvania	PA	Inactive	
Mu of Virginia	1985–2024	University of Richmond	Richmond, Virginia	VA	Inactive	
Nu of Virginia	1985–2024	Hampton University	Hampton, Virginia	VA	Inactive	
Theta of Louisiana	1986–1986	Louisiana State University Shreveport	Shreveport, Louisiana	LA	Inactive	
Alpha of Canada	1986–1986	University of Western Ontario	London, Ontario, Canada	ON	Inactive	
Kappa of Louisiana	1986–2014	Louisiana Christian University	Pineville, Louisiana	LA	Inactive	
Eta of Michigan	1986–2017	Adrian College	Adrian, Michigan	MI	Inactive	
Iota of Louisiana	1986–2018	Loyola University New Orleans	New Orleans, Louisiana	LA	Inactive	
Psi of Pennsylvania	1986–2018	Franklin & Marshall College	Lancaster, Pennsylvania	PA	Inactive	
Epsilon of Minnesota	1986–2023	St. Catherine University	Saint Paul, Minnesota	MN	Inactive	
Delta of Connecticut	1986–2024	Fairfield University	Fairfield, Connecticut	CT	Inactive	
Delta of Nebraska	1986–2024	Creighton University	Omaha, Nebraska	NE	Inactive	
Beta of New Mexico	1986–2024	New Mexico State University	Las Cruces, New Mexico	NM	Inactive	
Alpha Kappa of New York	1986–2024	State University of New York at Brockport	Brockport, New York	NY	Inactive	
Epsilon of Washington	1986–2024	Central Washington University	Ellensburg, Washington	WA	Inactive	
Chi of California	1986–2024	University of California, Berkeley	Berkeley, California	CA	Inactive	
Eta of Maryland	1986–2024	Mount St. Mary's University	Emmitsburg, Maryland	MD	Inactive	
Gamma of Montana	1987–1987	University of Great Falls	Great Falls, Montana	MT	Inactive	
Alpha of Idaho	1987–2022	University of Idaho	Moscow, Idaho	ID	Inactive	
Epsilon of Colorado	1987–2024	Metropolitan State University of Denver	Denver, Colorado	CO	Inactive	
Theta of Maryland	1987–2024	Towson University	Towson, Maryland	MD	Inactive	
Kappa of Massachusetts	1987–2024	Salem State University	Salem, Massachusetts	MA	Inactive	
Lambda of Massachusetts	1987–2024	Wellesley College	Wellesley, Massachusetts	MA	Inactive	
Nu of Illinois	1987–2024	Illinois College	Jacksonville, Illinois	IL	Inactive	
Tau of Texas	1987–2024	St. Mary's University, Texas	San Antonio, Texas	TX	Inactive	
Upsilon of Texas	1988–1988	University of Texas at Tyler	Tyler, Texas	TX	Inactive	
Alpha of the Philippines	1988–1988	Xavier University – Ateneo de Cagayan	Cagayan de Oro, Misamis Oriental, Philippines	PH-MSR	Inactive	
Zeta of Minnesota	1988–2010	St. Cloud State University	St. Cloud, Minnesota	MN	Inactive	
Delta of Mississippi	1988–2010	Jackson State University	Jackson, Mississippi	MS	Inactive	
Rho of Virginia	1988–2014	Hollins University	Hollins, Virginia	VA	Inactive	
Epsilon of Tennessee	1988–2024	Tennessee Tech	Cookeville, Tennessee	TN	Inactive	
Omicron of Virginia	1988–2024	Randolph–Macon College	Ashland, Virginia	VA	Inactive	
Eta of Georgia	1988–2024	Georgia Southern University	Statesboro, Georgia	GA	Inactive	
Xi of North Carolina	1988–2024	Fayetteville State University	Fayetteville, North Carolina	NC	Inactive	
Xi of Virginia	1988–2024	University of Lynchburg	Lynchburg, Virginia	VA	Inactive	
Pi of Virginia	1988–2024	Randolph College	Lynchburg, Virginia	VA	Inactive	
Alpha of China	1989–1989	Hohai University	Nanjing, Jiangsu, China	CN-JS	Inactive	
Lambda of Louisiana	1989–2011	University of New Orleans	New Orleans, Louisiana	LA	Inactive	
Eta of Minnesota	1989–2021	St. Olaf College	Northfield, Minnesota	MN	Inactive	
Lambda of Alabama	1989–2024	Troy University	Troy, Alabama	AL	Inactive	
Kappa of Indiana	1989–2024	Butler University	Indianapolis, Indiana	IN	Inactive	
Beta of Oregon	1989–2024	Oregon State University	Corvallis, Oregon	OR	Inactive	
Omega of Pennsylvania	1989–2023	PennWest Clarion	Clarion, Pennsylvania	PA	Consolidated	(Note: Omega of Pennsylvania, Alpha Xi of Pennsylvania, and Alpha Omega of Pennsylvania consolidated to bring all of the PennWest Universities under Omega–Alpha–Xi of Pennsylvania in 2023.)
Alpha Beta of Pennsylvania	1989–2024	Wilkes University	Wilkes-Barre, Pennsylvania	PA	Inactive	
Alpha Gamma of Pennsylvania	1989–2024	Moravian University	Bethlehem, Pennsylvania	PA	Inactive	
Psi of California	1989–2024	University of California, Irvine	Irvine, California	CA	Inactive	
Phi of Texas	1989–2024	McMurry University	Abilene, Texas	TX	Inactive	
Sigma of Virginia	1989–2024	Virginia Wesleyan University	Virginia Beach, Virginia	VA	Inactive	
Iota of Wisconsin	1989–2024	University of Wisconsin–Milwaukee	Milwaukee, Wisconsin	WI	Inactive	
Theta of Minnesota	1990–1990	Saint Mary's University of Minnesota	Winona, Minnesota	MN	Inactive	
Alpha Lambda of New York	1990–1990	St. Bonaventure University	St. Bonaventure, New York	NY	Inactive	
Zeta of Tennessee	1990–1990	Knoxville College	Knoxville, Tennessee	TN	Inactive	
Mu of Louisiana	1990–1990	McNeese State University	Lake Charles, Louisiana	LA	Inactive	
Alpha of Alaska	1990–2006	University of Alaska Anchorage	Anchorage, Alaska	AK	Inactive	
Eta of Florida	1990–2014	Florida Atlantic University	Boca Raton, Florida	FL	Inactive	
Zeta of South Carolina	1990–2019	Charleston Southern University	Charleston, South Carolina	SC	Inactive	
Lambda of Indiana	1990–2023	Franklin College	Franklin, Indiana	IN	Inactive	
Gamma of Arkansas	1990–2024	Hendrix College	Conway, Arkansas	AR	Inactive	
Theta of Georgia	1990–2024	Augusta University	Augusta, Georgia	GA	Inactive	
Zeta of Missouri	1990–2024	Missouri Southern State University	Joplin, Missouri	MO	Inactive	
Upsilon of Ohio	1990–2024	Baldwin Wallace University	Berea, Ohio	OH	Inactive	
Mu of Alabama	1990–2024	Birmingham–Southern College	Birmingham, Alabama	AL	Inactive	
Tau of Ohio	1990–2024	John Carroll University	University Heights, Ohio	OH	Inactive	
Chi of Texas	1990–2024	Abilene Christian University	Abilene, Texas	TX	Inactive	
Tau of Virginia	1990–2024	George Mason University	Fairfax, Virginia	VA	Inactive	
Eta of South Carolina	1991–1991	Voorhees University	Denmark, South Carolina	SC	Inactive	
Eta of Tennessee	1991–2014	Middle Tennessee State University	Murfreesboro, Tennessee	TN	Inactive	
Delta of Arkansas	1991–2017	University of Arkansas at Little Rock	Little Rock, Arkansas	AR	Inactive	
Iota of Georgia	1991–2017	Paine College	Augusta, Georgia	GA	Inactive	
Psi of Texas	1991–2018	Texas A&M University–Corpus Christi	Corpus Christi, Texas	TX	Inactive	
Epsilon of Arkansas	1991–2024	University of Central Arkansas	Conway, Arkansas	AR	Inactive	
Alpha of Hawaii	1991–2024	University of Hawaiʻi at Mānoa	Honolulu, Hawaii	HI	Inactive	
Epsilon of Kentucky	1991–2024	Northern Kentucky University	Highland Heights, Kentucky	KY	Inactive	
Epsilon of Mississippi	1991–2024	University of Southern Mississippi	Hattiesburg, Mississippi	MS	Inactive	
Omicron of North Carolina	1991–2024	Greensboro College	Greensboro, North Carolina	NC	Inactive	
Kappa of Wisconsin	1991–2024	University of Wisconsin–River Falls	River Falls, Wisconsin	WI	Inactive	
Iota of Minnesota	1991–2024	University of St. Thomas	Saint Paul, Minnesota	MN	Inactive	
Pi of North Carolina	1991–2024	Duke University	Durham, North Carolina	NC	Inactive	
Gamma of Maine	1992–1992	Colby College	Waterville, Maine	ME	Inactive	
Alpha Delta of Pennsylvania	1992–1992	Washington & Jefferson College	Washington, Pennsylvania	PA	Inactive	
Rho of North Carolina	1992–1992	Pfeiffer University	Misenheimer, North Carolina	NC	Inactive	
Epsilon of Oklahoma	1992–2003	University of Central Oklahoma	Edmond, Oklahoma	OK	Inactive	
Mu of Massachusetts	1992–2007	University of Massachusetts Amherst	Amherst, Massachusetts	MA	Inactive	
Zeta of Colorado	1992–2018	University of Colorado Colorado Springs	Colorado Springs, Colorado	CO	Inactive	
Alpha Mu of New York	1992–2019	St. John's University	Staten Island, New York	NY	Inactive	
Theta of South Carolina	1992–2019	Coastal Carolina University	Conway, South Carolina	SC	Inactive	
Omega of Texas	1992–2019	Our Lady of the Lake University	San Antonio, Texas	TX	Inactive	
Delta of Utah	1992–2020	University of Utah	Salt Lake City, Utah	UT	Inactive	
Theta of Tennessee	1992–2021	Lee University	Cleveland, Tennessee	TN	Inactive	
Alpha Beta of Texas	1992–2022	Trinity University	San Antonio, Texas	TX	Inactive	
Omega of California	1992–2024	University of San Francisco	San Francisco, California	CA	Inactive	
Theta of Florida	1992–2024	University of Tampa	Tampa, Florida	FL	Inactive	
Kappa of Georgia	1992–2024	Mercer University	Macon, Georgia	GA	Inactive	
Gamma of Oregon	1992–2024	University of Portland	Portland, Oregon	OR	Inactive	
Xi of Illinois	1992–2024	Bradley University	Peoria, Illinois	IL	Inactive	
Mu of Indiana	1992–2024	Indiana University–Purdue University Indianapolis	Indianapolis, Indiana	IN	Inactive	(Note: In 2024, IUPUI split into two separate universities, Indiana University Indianapolis and Purdue University in Indianapolis.)
Nu of Indiana	1992–2024	Valparaiso University	Valparaiso, Indiana	IN	Inactive	
Iota of South Carolina	1992–2024	College of Charleston	Charleston, South Carolina	SC	Inactive	
Iota of Tennessee	1992–2024	Vanderbilt University	Nashville, Tennessee	TN	Inactive	
Zeta of Oklahoma	1993–1993	Phillips University	Enid, Oklahoma	OK	Inactive	
Alpha Nu of New York	1993–2010 Colgate	Colgate University	Hamilton, New York	NY	Inactive	
Upsilon of Virginia	1993–2019	Averett University	Danville, Virginia	VA	Inactive	
Kappa of Tennessee	1993–2022	Tennessee State University	Nashville, Tennessee	TN	Inactive	
Alpha Xi of New York	1993–2024	Buffalo State University	Buffalo, New York	NY	Inactive	
Sigma of North Carolina	1993–2024	Elon University	Elon, North Carolina	NC	Inactive	
Zeta of Washington	1993–2024	Pacific Lutheran University	Tacoma, Washington	WA	Inactive	
Iota of Florida	1993–2024	University of North Florida	Jacksonville, Florida	FL	Inactive	
Beta of the Philippines	1994–1994	University of the Philippines Diliman	Quezon City, Metro Manila, Philippines		Inactive	
Zeta of Kentucky	1994–2022	Georgetown College	Georgetown, Kentucky	KY	Inactive	
Alpha Beta of California	1994–2024	California State University, Long Beach	Long Beach, California	CA	Inactive	
Alpha Gamma of California	1994–2024	Saint Mary's College of California	Moraga, California	CA	Inactive	
Delta of Montana	1994–2024	Carroll College	Helena, Montana	MT	Inactive	
Alpha Omicron of New York	1994–2024	College of Staten Island	Staten Island, New York	NY	Inactive	
Alpha Rho of New York	1994–2024	Molloy University	Rockville Centre, New York	NY	Inactive	
Lambda of Tennessee	1994–2024	University of Tennessee at Chattanooga	Chattanooga, Tennessee	TN	Inactive	
Alpha Pi of New York	1994–2024	State University of New York at Oneonta	Oneonta, New York	NY	Inactive	
Alpha of Wyoming	1994–2024	University of Wyoming	Laramie, Wyoming	WY	Inactive	
Nu of Massachusetts	1994–2024	University of Massachusetts Lowell	Lowell, Massachusetts	MA	Inactive	
Nu of New Jersey	1994–2024	Drew University	Madison, New Jersey	NJ	Inactive	
Alpha Delta of California	1995–2024	California State University, San Marcos	San Marcos, California	CA	Inactive	
Kappa of Florida	1995–2024	Eckerd College	St. Petersburg, Florida	FL	Inactive	
Lambda of Florida	1995–2024	Florida International University	Miami, Florida	FL	Inactive	
Kappa of Minnesota	1995–2024	Gustavus Adolphus College	St. Peter, Minnesota	MN	Inactive	
Alpha Sigma of New York	1995–2024	Hartwick College	Oneonta, New York	NY	Inactive	
Alpha Tau of New York	1995–2024	Vassar College	Poughkeepsie, New York	NY	Inactive	
Kappa of South Carolina	1995–2024	Lander University	Greenwood, South Carolina	SC	Inactive	
Xi of Indiana	1995–2024	Saint Mary's College	Notre Dame, Indiana	IN	Inactive	
Xi of Massachusetts	1995–2024	Wheaton College	Norton, Massachusetts	MA	Inactive	
Tau of North Carolina	1995–2024	Lenoir–Rhyne University	Hickory, North Carolina	NC	Inactive	
Alpha Epsilon of Texas	1996–1996	University of Texas at El Paso	El Paso, Texas	TX	Inactive	
Alpha Epsilon of California	1996–2004	University of California, Riverside	Riverside, California	CA	Inactive	
Nu of Alabama	1996–2019	University of Mobile	Mobile, Alabama	AL	Inactive	
Alpha Zeta of California	1996–2024	Vanguard University	Costa Mesa, California	CA	Inactive	
Epsilon of Connecticut	1996–2024	Quinnipiac University	Hamden, Connecticut	CT	Inactive	
Zeta of Connecticut	1996–2024	Sacred Heart University	Fairfield, Connecticut	CT	Inactive	
Omicron of Illinois	1996–2024	Augustana College	Rock Island, Illinois	IL	Inactive	
Alpha Upsilon of New York	1996–2024	SUNY Polytechnic Institute	Utica, New York	NY	Inactive	
Alpha Epsilon of Pennsylvania	1996–2024	Kutztown University of Pennsylvania	Kutztown, Pennsylvania	PA	Inactive	
Alpha Delta of Texas	1996–2024	University of Texas Rio Grande Valley	Edinburg, Texas	TX	Inactive	
Alpha Gamma of Texas	1996–2024	University of Houston–Clear Lake	Houston, Texas	TX	Inactive	
Lambda of Wisconsin	1997–2005	University of Wisconsin–Superior	Superior, Wisconsin	WI	Inactive	
Alpha Zeta of Texas	1997–2018	Texas A&M International University	Laredo, Texas	TX	Inactive	
Eta of Kansas	1997–2018	Benedictine College	Atchison, Kansas	KS	Inactive	
Xi of Alabama	1997–2022	Auburn University at Montgomery	Montgomery, Alabama	AL	Inactive	
Alpha Eta of California	1997–2024	Loyola Marymount University	Los Angeles, California	CA	Inactive	
Omicron of Indiana	1997–2024	University of Southern Indiana	Evansville, Indiana	IN	Inactive	
Iota of Maryland	1997–2024	University of Maryland, Baltimore County	Baltimore, Maryland	MD	Inactive	
Alpha Zeta of Pennsylvania	1998–1998	Cheyney University of Pennsylvania	Cheyney, Pennsylvania	PA	Inactive	
Alpha of Finland	1998–1998	University of Turku	Turku, Southwest Finland, Finland		Inactive	
Alpha of Singapore	1998–1998	National University of Singapore	Queenstown, Singapore		Inactive	
Beta of Alaska	1998–2016	University of Alaska Fairbanks	Fairbanks, Alaska	AK	Inactive	
Beta of New Hampshire	1998–2017	Keene State College	Keene, New Hampshire	NH	Inactive	
Eta of Kentucky	1998–2019	Transylvania University	Lexington, Kentucky	KY	Inactive	
Mu of Wisconsin	1998–2021	University of Wisconsin–La Crosse	La Crosse, Wisconsin	WI	Inactive	
Omicron of Alabama	1998–2024	Samford University	Birmingham, Alabama	AL	Inactive	
Alpha Theta of California	1998–2024	California State University, Sacramento	Sacramento, California	CA	Inactive	
Alpha Iota of California	1998–2024	University of La Verne	La Verne, California	CA	Inactive	
Alpha Kappa of California	1998–2024	California State University, Stanislaus	Turlock, California	CA	Inactive	
Alpha Lambda of California	1998–2024	California Lutheran University	Thousand Oaks, California	CA	Inactive	
Eta of Connecticut	1998–2024	Southern Connecticut State University	New Haven, Connecticut	CT	Inactive	
Theta of Michigan	1998–2024	Grand Valley State University	Allendale, Michigan	MI	Inactive	
Epsilon of Nebraska	1998–2024	Doane University	Crete, Nebraska	NE	Inactive	
Omicron of New Jersey	1998–2024	Caldwell University	Caldwell, New Jersey	NJ	Inactive	
Alpha Eta of Texas	1998–2024	Tarleton State University	Stephenville, Texas	TX	Inactive	
Alpha Theta of Texas	1998–2024	Southwestern University	Georgetown, Texas	TX	Inactive	
Epsilon of Utah	1998–2024	Southern Utah University	Cedar City, Utah	UT	Inactive	
Pi of Illinois	1998–2024	McKendree University	Lebanon, Illinois	IL	Inactive	
Iota of Michigan	1998–2024	Hope College	Holland, Michigan	MI	Inactive	
Xi of New Jersey	1998–2024	The College of New Jersey	Ewing Township, New Jersey	NJ	Inactive	
Phi of Ohio	1998–2024	College of Wooster	Wooster, Ohio	OH	Inactive	
Nu of Wisconsin	1998–2024	University of Wisconsin–Stevens Point	Stevens Point, Wisconsin	WI	Inactive	
Kappa of Maryland	1999–2024	McDaniel College	Westminster, Maryland	MD	Inactive	
Lambda of Minnesota	1999–2024	Augsburg University	Minneapolis, Minnesota	MN	Inactive	
Zeta of Nebraska	1999–2024	Nebraska Wesleyan University	Lincoln, Nebraska	NE	Inactive	
Lambda of Georgia	2000–2014	University of North Georgia	Dahlonega, Georgia	GA	Inactive	
Alpha Iota of Texas	2000–2018	Texas A&M University–Kingsville	Kingsville, Texas	TX	Inactive	
Zeta of Arkansas	2000–2022	Henderson State University	Arkadelphia, Arkansas	AR	Inactive	
Alpha Mu of California	2000–2024	Santa Clara University	Santa Clara, California	CA	Inactive	
Alpha Eta of Pennsylvania	2000–2024	King's College	Wilkes-Barre, Pennsylvania	PA	Inactive	
Pi of Indiana	2000–2024	University of Indianapolis	Indianapolis, Indiana	IN	Inactive	
Eta of Missouri	2000–2024	Saint Louis University	St. Louis, Missouri	MO	Inactive	
Chi of Ohio	2000–2024	Ohio Northern University	Ada, Ohio	OH	Inactive	
Alpha Iota of Pennsylvania	2001–2001	Immaculata College	East Whiteland Township, Pennsylvania	PA	Inactive	
Mu of Minnesota	2001–2001	University of Minnesota Duluth	Duluth, Minnesota	MN	Inactive	
Nu of Louisiana	2001–2004	Xavier University of Louisiana	New Orleans, Louisiana	LA	Inactive	
Lambda of Maryland	2001–2019	Coppin State University	Baltimore, Maryland	MD	Inactive	
Active	2001–2020	University of San Diego	San Diego, California	CA	Inactive	
Alpha Phi of New York	2001–2024	United States Military Academy	West Point, New York	NY	Inactive	
Alpha Theta of Pennsylvania	2001–2024	Cabrini University	Radnor Township, Pennsylvania	PA	Inactive	
Alpha Kappa of Pennsylvania	2001–2024	Messiah University	Mechanicsburg, Pennsylvania	PA	Inactive	
Eta of Washington	2001–2024	Western Washington University	Bellingham, Washington	WA	Inactive	
Mu of Maryland	2001–2024	St. Mary's College of Maryland	St. Mary's City, Maryland	MD	Inactive	
Pi of New Jersey	2001–2024	Fairleigh Dickinson University	Madison, New Jersey	NJ	Inactive	
Rho of New Jersey	2001–2024	Saint Peter's University	Jersey City, New Jersey	NJ	Inactive	
Mu of Tennessee	2001–2024	Austin Peay State University	Clarksville, Tennessee	TN	Inactive	
Omicron of Massachusetts	2002–2003	Harvard University	Cambridge, Massachusetts	MA	Inactive	
Gamma of South Dakota	2002–2010	Black Hills State University	Spearfish, South Dakota	SD	Inactive	
Alpha Lambda of Pennsylvania	2002–2010	Gwynedd–Mercy College	Gwynedd Valley, Pennsylvania	PA	Inactive	
Delta of Oregon	2002–2016	Southern Oregon University	Ashland, Oregon	OR	Inactive	
Pi of Alabama	2002–2017	Alabama A&M University	Normal, Alabama	AL	Inactive	
Alpha Chi of New York	2002–2019	Canisius College	Buffalo, New York	NY	Inactive	
Eta of Colorado	2002–2021	Western Colorado University	Gunnison, Colorado	CO	Inactive	
Theta of Missouri	2002–2024	Columbia College	Columbia, Missouri	MO	Inactive	
Alpha Mu of Pennsylvania	2002–2024	Westminster College	New Wilmington, Pennsylvania	PA	Inactive	
Lambda of South Carolina	2003–2010	Presbyterian College	Clinton, South Carolina	SC	Inactive	
Alpha Kappa of Texas	2003–2011	Houston Baptist University	Houston, Texas	TX	Inactive	
Nu of Georgia	2003–2011	Savannah State University	Savannah, Georgia	GA	Inactive	
Sigma of New Jersey	2003–2015	Georgian Court University	Lakewood Township, New Jersey	NJ	Inactive	
Mu of Florida	2003–2018	Bethune–Cookman University	Daytona Beach, Florida	FL	Inactive	
Tau of Massachusetts	2003–2023	Westfield State University	Westfield, Massachusetts	MA	Inactive	
Sigma of Massachusetts	2003–2024	Stonehill College	Easton, Massachusetts	MA	Inactive	
Alpha Psi of New York	2003–2024	Siena College	Loudonville, New York	NY	Inactive	
Mu of Georgia	2003–2024	Kennesaw State University	Kennesaw, Georgia	GA	Inactive	
Pi of Massachusetts	2003–2024	Clark University	Worcester, Massachusetts	MA	Inactive	
Rho of Massachusetts	2003–2024	Assumption University	Worcester, Massachusetts	MA	Inactive	
Iota of Missouri	2003–2024	Webster University	St. Louis, Missouri	MO	Inactive	
Psi of Ohio	2003–2024	Capital University	Columbus, Ohio	OH	Inactive	
Xi of Wisconsin	2003–2024	Carthage College	Kenosha, Wisconsin	WI	Inactive	
Beta of North Dakota	2004–2010	North Dakota State University	Fargo, North Dakota	ND	Inactive	
Phi of Virginia	2004–2021	Mary Baldwin University	Staunton, Virginia	VA	Inactive	
Kappa of Michigan	2004–2024	Oakland University	Rochester, Michigan	MI	Inactive	
Epsilon of Oregon	2004–2024	Linfield University	McMinnville, Oregon	OR	Inactive	
Zeta of Oregon	2004–2024	Portland State University	Portland, Oregon	OR	Inactive	
Alpha Nu of Pennsylvania	2004–2024	Lycoming College	Williamsport, Pennsylvania	PA	Inactive	
Alpha Lambda of Texas	2004–2024	Prairie View A&M University	Prairie View, Texas	TX	Inactive	
Chi of Virginia	2005–2019	University of Mary Washington	Fredericksburg, Virginia	VA	Inactive	
Upsilon of North Carolina	2005–2022	Davidson College	Davidson, North Carolina	NC	Inactive	
Alpha Xi of California	2005–2024	California State University, Bakersfield	Bakersfield, California	CA	Inactive	
Theta of Colorado	2005–2024	Colorado College	Colorado Springs, Colorado	CO	Inactive	
Upsilon of Massachusetts	2005–2024	Framingham State University	Framingham, Massachusetts	MA	Inactive	
Gamma of Rhode Island	2005–2024	Providence College	Providence, Rhode Island	RI	Inactive	
Xi of Georgia	2005–2024	Morehouse College	Atlanta, Georgia	GA	Inactive	
Nu of Maryland	2005–2024	Washington College	Chestertown, Maryland	MD	Inactive	
Nu of Minnesota	2005–2024	Minnesota State University Moorhead	Moorhead, Minnesota	MN	Inactive	
Phi of North Carolina	2005–2024	Wingate University	Wingate, North Carolina	NC	Inactive	
Nu of Tennessee	2006–2007	Belmont University	Nashville, Tennessee	TN	Inactive	
Zeta of District of Columbia	2006–2015	Gallaudet University	Washington, D.C.	DC	Inactive	
Rho of Illinois	2006–2016	Roosevelt University	Chicago, Illinois	IL	Inactive	
Tau of New Jersey	2006–2019	College of St. Elizabeth	Morris Township, New Jersey	NJ	Inactive	
Phi of Massachusetts	2006–2022	Merrimack College	North Andover, Massachusetts	MA	Inactive	
Iota of Colorado	2006–2024	University of Northern Colorado	Greeley, Colorado	CO	Inactive	
Alpha Xi of Pennsylvania	2006–2023	PennWest Edinboro	Edinboro, Pennsylvania	PA	Consolidated	
Xi of Maryland	2006–2024	Johns Hopkins University	Baltimore, Maryland	MD	Inactive	
Beta of Idaho	2007–2007	Idaho State University	Pocatello, Idaho	ID	Inactive	
Theta of Iowa	2007–2008	Mount Mercy College	Cedar Rapids, Iowa	IA	Inactive	
Lambda of Michigan	2007–2009	Calvin College	Grand Rapids, Michigan	MI	Inactive	
Omicron of Georgia	2007–2010	Piedmont College	Demorest, Georgia	GA	Inactive	
Omicron of Wisconsin	2007–2010	University of Wisconsin–Parkside	Kenosha, Wisconsin	WI	Inactive	
Eta of Oregon	2007–2010	Pacific University	Forest Grove, Oregon	OR	Inactive	
Alpha Omega of New York	2007–2015	College of Saint Rose	Albany, New York	NY	Inactive	
Alpha Pi of California	2007–2019	University of California, San Diego	San Diego, California	CA	Inactive	
Pi of Georgia	2007–2019	Reinhardt University	Waleska, Georgia	GA	Inactive	
Alpha Omicron of California	2007–2024	Chapman University	Orange, California	CA	Inactive	
Sigma of Illinois	2007–2024	North Central College	Naperville, Illinois	IL	Inactive	
Omega of Ohio	2007–2024	Walsh University	North Canton, Ohio	OH	Inactive	
Alpha Omicron of Pennsylvania	2007–2024	Lebanon Valley College	Annville, Pennsylvania	PA	Inactive	
Psi of Virginia	2007–2024	Radford University	Radford, Virginia	VA	Inactive	
Alpha Mu of Texas	2007–2024	Angelo State University	San Angelo, Texas	TX	Inactive	
Eta of Arkansas	2007–2024	Arkansas Tech University	Russellville, Arkansas	AR	Inactive	
Tau of Illinois	2007–2024	Lake Forest College	Lake Forest, Illinois	IL	Inactive	
Chi of Massachusetts	2007–2024	Bridgewater State University	Bridgewater, Massachusetts	MA	Inactive	
Psi of Massachusetts	2007–2024	Simmons University	Boston, Massachusetts	MA	Inactive	
Mu of Michigan	2007–2024	Aquinas College	Grand Rapids, Michigan	MI	Inactive	
Chi of North Carolina	2007–2024	University of North Carolina at Pembroke	Pembroke, North Carolina	NC	Inactive	
Omega of North Carolina	2008–2010	Shaw University	Raleigh, North Carolina	NC	Inactive	
Xi of Louisiana	2008–2014	University of Louisiana at Lafayette	Lafayette, Louisiana	LA	Inactive	
Pi of Wisconsin	2008–2014	Viterbo University	La Crosse, Wisconsin	WI	Inactive	
Alpha Pi of Pennsylvania	2008–2015	Villanova University	Villanova, Pennsylvania	PA	Inactive	
Nu of Michigan	2008–2017	Lake Superior State University	Sault Ste. Marie, Michigan	MI	Inactive	
Beta Alpha of New York	2008–2020	State University of New York at Old Westbury	Old Westbury, New York	NY	Inactive	
Rho of Georgia	2008–2021	Albany State University	Albany, Georgia	GA	Inactive	
Alpha Rho of California	2008–2024	California State University, Chico	Chico, California	CA	Inactive	
Theta of Connecticut	2008–2024	Eastern Connecticut State University	Willimantic, Connecticut	CT	Inactive	
Omega of Massachusetts	2008–2024	Emmanuel College	Boston, Massachusetts	MA	Inactive	
Upsilon of New Jersey	2008–2024	Rutgers University–New Brunswick	New Brunswick, New Jersey	NJ	Inactive	
Beta Beta of New York	2008–2024	Niagara University	Niagara, New York	NY	Inactive	
Delta of Rhode Island	2008–2024	Bryant University	Smithfield, Rhode Island	RI	Inactive	
Omega of Virginia	2008–2024	Washington and Lee University	Lexington, Virginia	VA	Inactive	
Psi of North Carolina	2008–2024	High Point University	High Point, North Carolina	NC	Inactive	
Alpha Rho of Pennsylvania	2009–2017	Grove City College	Grove City, Pennsylvania	NC	Inactive	
Alpha Beta of North Carolina	2009–2018	Methodist University	Fayetteville, North Carolina	NC	Inactive	
Nu of Florida	2009–2021	Flagler College	St. Augustine, Florida	FL	Inactive	
Alpha Tau of California	2009–2023	California State University, Channel Islands	Camarillo, California	CA	Inactive	
Alpha Sigma of California	2009–2024	University of the Pacific	Stockton, California	CA	Inactive	
Theta of Nebraska	2009–2024	Hastings College	Hastings, Nebraska	NE	Inactive	
Beta Gamma of New York	2009–2024	State University of New York at Purchase	Purchase, New York	NY	Inactive	
Beta Delta of New York	2009–2024	Manhattan University	Bronx, New York City, New York	NY	Inactive	
Alpha Beta of Ohio	2009–2024	Kenyon College	Gambier, Ohio	OH	Inactive	
Alpha Nu of Texas	2009–2024	Texas Wesleyan University	Fort Worth, Texas	TX	Inactive	
Xi of Michigan	2009–2024	Central Michigan University	Mount Pleasant, Michigan	MI	Inactive	
Eta of Nebraska	2009–2024	Wayne State College	Wayne, Nebraska	NE	Inactive	
Mu of South Carolina	2009–2024	University of South Carolina Upstate	Spartanburg, South Carolina	SC	Inactive	
Omicron of Louisiana	2010–2010	Louisiana Tech University	Ruston, Louisiana	LA	Inactive	
Theta of Oregon	2010–2012	George Fox University	Newberg, Oregon	OR	Inactive	
Lambda of Missouri	2010–2014	Fontbonne University	St. Louis, Missouri	MO	Inactive	
Omicron of Michigan	2010–2022	Eastern Michigan University	Ypsilanti, Michigan	MI	Inactive	
Alpha Pi of Texas	2010–2022	Texas A&M University–Central Texas	Killeen, Texas	TX	Inactive	
Xi of Florida	2010–2023	Jacksonville University	Jacksonville, Florida	FL	Inactive	
Kappa of Colorado	2010–2024	Colorado Mesa University	Grand Junction, Colorado	CO	Inactive	
Iota of Connecticut	2010–2024	Connecticut College	New London, Connecticut	CT	Inactive	
Kappa of Missouri	2010–2024	Truman State University	Kirksville, Missouri	MO	Inactive	
Alpha Xi of Texas	2010–2024	University of Texas at San Antonio	San Antonio, Texas	TX	Inactive	
Alpha Omicron of Texas	2010–2024	St. Edward's University	Austin, Texas	TX	Inactive	
Rho of Alabama	2011–2023	Athens State University	Athens, Alabama	AL	Inactive	
Gamma of Idaho	2011–2024	Brigham Young University–Idaho	Rexburg, Idaho	ID	Inactive	
Upsilon of Illinois	2011–2024	Northeastern Illinois University	Chicago, Illinois	IL	Inactive	
Beta Epsilon of New York	2011–2024	Iona University	New Rochelle, New York	NY	Inactive	
Beta Zeta of New York	2011–2024	Ithaca College	Ithaca, New York	NY	Inactive	
Alpha Sigma of Pennsylvania	2011–2024	Ursinus College	Collegeville, Pennsylvania	PA	Inactive	
Beta of Canada	2012–2013	Mount Saint Vincent University	Halifax, Nova Scotia, Canada	NS	Inactive	
Theta of Kentucky	2012–2015	Alice Lloyd College	Pippa Passes, Kentucky	KY	Inactive	
Beta Eta of New York	2012–2014	Marymount Manhattan College	Manhattan, New York	NY	Inactive	
Omicron of Florida	2012–2017	Nova Southeastern University	Fort Lauderdale, Florida	FL	Inactive	
Rho of Michigan	2012–2019	Spring Arbor University	Spring Arbor, Michigan	MI	Inactive	
Alpha Upsilon of Pennsylvania	2012–2020	Saint Vincent College	Latrobe, Pennsylvania	PA	Inactive	
Xi of Minnesota	2012–2020	College of Saint Benedict	St. Joseph, Minnesota	MN	Inactive	
Xi of Minnesota	2012–2020	Saint John's University	Collegeville, Minnesota	MN	Inactive	
Sigma of Georgia	2012–2022	Georgia Southwestern State University	Americus, Georgia	GA	Inactive	
Rho of Florida	2012–2022	Florida Memorial University	Miami Gardens, Florida	FL	Inactive	
Pi of Michigan	2012–2023	University of Michigan–Flint	Flint, Michigan	MI	Inactive	
Theta of Arkansas	2012–2024	Ouachita Baptist University	Arkadelphia, Arkansas	AR	Inactive	
Delta of South Dakota	2012–2024	Augustana University	Sioux Falls, South Dakota	SD	Inactive	
Pi of Florida	2012–2024	Saint Leo University	St. Leo, Florida	FL	Inactive	
Eta of Oklahoma	2012–2024	Northeastern State University	Tahlequah, Oklahoma	OK	Inactive	
Rho of Indiana	2013–2014	Manchester University	North Manchester, Indiana	IN	Inactive	
Alpha Sigma of Texas	2013–2017	Wiley College	Marshall, Texas	TX	Inactive	
Xi of Tennessee	2013–2021	University of Tennessee at Martin	Martin, Tennessee	TN	Inactive	
Alpha Upsilon of California	2013–2024	California State Polytechnic University, Humboldt	Arcata, California	CA	Inactive	
Lambda of Colorado	2013–2024	Adams State University	Alamosa, Colorado	CO	Inactive	
Theta of Washington	2013–2024	Whitworth University	Spokane, Washington	WA	Inactive	
Alpha Phi of Pennsylvania	2014–2014	Widener University	Chester, Pennsylvania	PA	Inactive	
Sigma of Wisconsin	2014–2017	Beloit College	Beloit, Wisconsin	WI	Inactive	
Alpha Delta of North Carolina	2014–2018	Elizabeth City State University	Elizabeth City, North Carolina	NC	Inactive	
Alpha Gamma of Ohio	2014–2018	Mount St. Joseph University	Cincinnati, Ohio	OH	Inactive	
Rho of Wisconsin	2014–2019	Ripon College	Ripon, Wisconsin	WI	Inactive	
Pi of Louisiana	2014–2022	Southeastern Louisiana University	Hammond, Louisiana	LA	Inactive	
Alpha Delta of Ohio	2014–2022	Shawnee State University	Portsmouth, Ohio	OH	Inactive	
Iota of Iowa	2014–2022	Cornell College	Mount Vernon, Iowa	IA	Inactive	
Alpha Phi of California	2014–2024	California Baptist University	Riverside, California	CA	Inactive	
Sigma of Florida	2014–2024	Rollins College	Winter Park, Florida	FL	Inactive	
Kappa of Iowa	2014–2024	Wartburg College	Waverly, Iowa	IA	Inactive	
Iota of Kentucky	2014–2024	Murray State University	Murray, Kentucky	KY	Inactive	
Omicron of Maryland	2014–2024	Hood College	Frederick, Maryland	MD	Inactive	
Omicron of Minnesota	2014–2024	Winona State University	Winona, Minnesota	MN	Inactive	
Alpha Gamma of North Carolina	2014–2024	Meredith College	Raleigh, North Carolina	NC	Inactive	
Sigma of Michigan	2015–2015	Ferris State University	Big Rapids, Michigan	MI	Inactive	
Alpha Tau of Texas	2015–2024	University of North Texas at Dallas	Dallas, Texas	TX	Inactive	
Omicron of Tennessee	2016–2017	Union University	Jackson, Tennessee	TN	Inactive	
Sigma of Indiana	2016–2018	Anderson University	Anderson, Indiana	IN	Inactive	
Beta Theta of New York	2016–2024	John Jay College of Criminal Justice	New York City, New York	NY	Inactive	
Tau of Florida	2016–2024	Florida A&M University	Tallahassee, Florida	FL	Inactive	
Kappa of Kentucky	2017–2018	Berea College	Berea, Kentucky	KY	Inactive	
Alpha Beta of Massachusetts	2017–2018	American International College	Springfield, Massachusetts	MA	Inactive	
Alpha Psi of California	2017–2019	University of California, Merced	Merced, California	CA	Inactive	
Tau of Indiana	2017–2023	Marian University	Indianapolis, Indiana	IN	Inactive	
Alpha Chi of California	2017–2024	National University	La Jolla, California	CA	Inactive	
Alpha Gamma of Massachusetts	2017–2024	Curry College	Milton, Massachusetts	MA	Inactive	
Alpha Epsilon of North Carolina	2017–2024	Queens University of Charlotte	Charlotte, North Carolina	NC	Inactive	
Alpha Beta of Virginia	2017–2024	Eastern Mennonite University	Harrisonburg, Virginia	VA	Inactive	
Alpha Beta of Virginia	2017–2024	Bluffton University	Harrisonburg, Virginia	VA	Inactive	
Alpha Beta of Virginia	2017–2024	Goshen College	Harrisonburg, Virginia	VA	Inactive	
Phi of Illinois	2017–2024	Southern Illinois University Edwardsville	Edwardsville, Illinois	IL	Inactive	
Pi of Tennessee	2017–2024	Rhodes College	Memphis, Tennessee	TN	Inactive	
Alpha Epsilon of Ohio	2018–2019	University of Mount Union	Alliance, Ohio	OH	Inactive	
Upsilon of Indiana	2018–2020	Purdue University Northwest	Hammond, Indiana	IN	Inactive	
Alpha Chi of Pennsylvania	2018–2024	Thiel College	Greenville, Pennsylvania	PA	Inactive	
Beta Iota of New York	2019–2019	Hobart and William Smith Colleges	Geneva, New York	NY	Inactive	
Nu of South Carolina	2019–2021	Newberry College	Newberry, South Carolina	SC	Inactive	
Lambda of Kentucky	2019–2022	Kentucky State University	Frankfort, Kentucky	KY	Inactive	
Phi of New Jersey	2019–2022	Ramapo College	Mahwah, New Jersey	NJ	Inactive	
Alpha Omega of California	2019–2024	California Polytechnic State University, San Luis Obispo	San Luis Obispo, California	CA	Inactive	
Alpha Psi of Pennsylvania	2019–2024	York College of Pennsylvania	York, Pennsylvania	PA	Inactive	
Zeta of Utah	2019–2024	Utah Tech University	St. George, Utah		Inactive	
Mu of Missouri	2020–2020	Missouri Western State University	St. Joseph, Missouri	MO	Inactive	
Kappa of Connecticut	2020–2024	University of Connecticut	Storrs, Connecticut	CT	Inactive	
Upsilon of Florida	2020–2024	Florida Gulf Coast University	Fort Myers, Florida	FL	Inactive	
Upsilon of Georgia	2020–2024	Oglethorpe University	Atlanta, Georgia	GA	Inactive	
Iota of Washington	2020–2024	Seattle Pacific University	Seattle, Washington	WA	Inactive	
Tau of Georgia	2020–2024	Spelman College	Atlanta, Georgia	GA	Inactive	
Phi of Indiana	2020–2024	Indiana University Kokomo	Kokomo, Indiana	IN	Inactive	
Alpha Omega of Pennsylvania	2020–2023	PennWest California	California, Pennsylvania	PA	Consolidated	
Alpha Phi of Texas	2021–2022	West Texas A&M University	Canyon, Texas	TX	Inactive	
Alpha of Guam	2021–2024	University of Guam	Mangilao, Guam	GU	Inactive	
Alpha Upsilon of Texas	2021–2024	Texas A&M University–Texarkana	Texarkana, Texas	TX	Inactive	
Gamma of New Hampshire	2021–2024	Dartmouth College	Hanover, New Hampshire	NH	Inactive	
Alpha Zeta	2021–2024	Otterbein University	Westerville, Ohio	OH	Inactive	
Alpha Chi of Texas	2022–2024	Rice University	Houston, Texas	TX	Inactive	
Alpha Zeta of North Carolina	2022–2024	North Carolina Wesleyan University	Rocky Mount, North Carolina	NC	Inactive	
Xi of South Carolina	2023–2024	University of South Carolina Aiken	Aiken, South Carolina	SC	Inactive	
**Omega–Alpha–Xi of Pennsylvania**	2023	PennWest California	California, Pennsylvania	PA	Active	
**Omega–Alpha–Xi of Pennsylvania**	2023	PennWest Clarion	Clarion, Pennsylvania	PA	Active	
**Omega–Alpha–Xi of Pennsylvania**	2023	PennWest Edinboro	Edinboro, Pennsylvania	PA	Active	
**Phi–Alpha–Beta of Pennsylvania**	2023	Commonwealth University-Bloomsburg	Bloomsburg, Pennsylvania	PA	Active	(Note: Absorbed Phi of Pennsylvania.)
**Phi–Alpha–Beta of Pennsylvania**	2023	Commonwealth University-Lock Haven	Lock Haven, Pennsylvania	PA	Active	(Note: Absorbed Phi of Pennsylvania.)
**Phi–Alpha–Beta of Pennsylvania**	2023	Commonwealth University-Mansfield	Mansfield, Pennsylvania	PA	Active	(Note: Absorbed Phi of Pennsylvania.)
**Chi of New Jersey**	2024	Bloomfield College	Montclair, New Jersey	NJ	Active	
**Alpha Gamma of Virginia**	2024	University of Virginia's College at Wise	Wise, Virginia	VA	Active	
