= WWJD =

- Pippa Passes, Kentucky; United States
- Broadcast area: Eastern Kentucky
- Frequency: 91.7 MHz
- Branding: Eagle 91.7

Programming
- Format: Contemporary Christian

Ownership
- Owner: Alice Lloyd College

History
- Former call signs: WOAL-FM
- Call sign meaning: What Would Jesus Do?

Technical information
- Licensing authority: FCC
- Facility ID: 56225
- Class: C3
- ERP: 7,300 watts
- HAAT: 166 meters (545 feet)
- Transmitter coordinates: 37°19′45″N 82°52′30″W

Links
- Public license information: Public file; LMS
- Website: WWJD Online

WWJD (91.7 FM, "Eagle 91.7") is a radio station licensed to serve Pippa Passes, Kentucky. The station is owned by Alice Lloyd College. It broadcasts in a Contemporary Christian music format.

The station has been assigned these call letters by the Federal Communications Commission, by the college's request, since August 29, 1997.

== See also ==
- Campus radio
- List of college radio stations in the United States
