= Work college =

Type of U.S. college that requires work

Work colleges are colleges in the United States that require students to work and integrate that work into the college learning experience. A work college is a public or private non-profit, four-year degree-granting institution with a commitment to community service. To qualify for Federal designation as a work college, at least half of the full-time students, including all students who reside on campus, must participate in a "comprehensive work-learning-service" program as an essential and core component of their educational programs, regardless of their academic program or their financial need.

Students typically work 6 to 15 hours per week while enrolled. Their compensation helps offset the cost of tuition, and student labor can lower operational costs. Work colleges differ from need-based forms of financial support such as Federal Work Study, because students cannot "buy" their way out of the work requirement; participation is part of the educational experience. Students are regularly assessed on their work performance, and can be dismissed from the institution for non-performance. Students typically work on campus, though some work colleges allow students to work at off-campus jobs.

There are eight federally recognized work colleges in the Work Colleges Consortium, meeting the requirements for operation as overseen by the U.S. Department of Education.

- Alice Lloyd College in Pippa Passes, Kentucky
- Antioch College in Yellow Springs, Ohio
- Berea College in Berea, Kentucky
- Blackburn College in Carlinville, Illinois
- College of the Ozarks in Point Lookout, Missouri
- Kuyper College in Grand Rapids, Michigan
- Paul Quinn College in Dallas, Texas
- Warren Wilson College in Asheville, North Carolina

There is also one two-year work college:

- Deep Springs College, California, limited to 26 students

== Predecessors ==
A predecessor of the work college is the manual labor college movement of the 1820s up to about 1860. It also combined work, usually agricultural or mechanical, with preparatory or college study, often preparation for the ministry. Although it helped students financially, equally if not more important were the work's perceived healthful effects on the bodies and minds of the students.

== See also ==
- Manual labor college
- Deep Springs College
- Land-grant university
- Federal Work-Study Program
- Sterling College, a former work college
