= June Buchanan School =

Coordinates: 37.3359°N 82.8736°W

The June Buchanan School (JBS) is a private K-12 prep school located on the campus of Alice Lloyd College in Pippa Passes, in the U.S. state of Kentucky. It is named after founder June Buchanan, who, along with social reformer Alice Spencer Geddes Lloyd, founded the college. It has a student-teacher ratio of 10–1. The school is accredited by the Southern Association of Colleges and Schools.

Even though JBS is located on the campus of Alice Lloyd College, it is a separate division of the Caney Creek Community Center, the non-profit organization that operates both institutions. The current dean of JBS is Amanda Clark, and the assistant dean is Trey Moore. Country star David Tolliver from the Universal/Mercury Records duo Halfway To Hazard graduated from the high school.

Eighty percent of JBS students participate in extracurricular activities, including speech and academic teams, drama, baseball, boys' and girls' basketball, cross-country, golf, softball, weightlifting, dance and tennis.
