= Pippa Passes =

1841 verse drama by Robert Browning

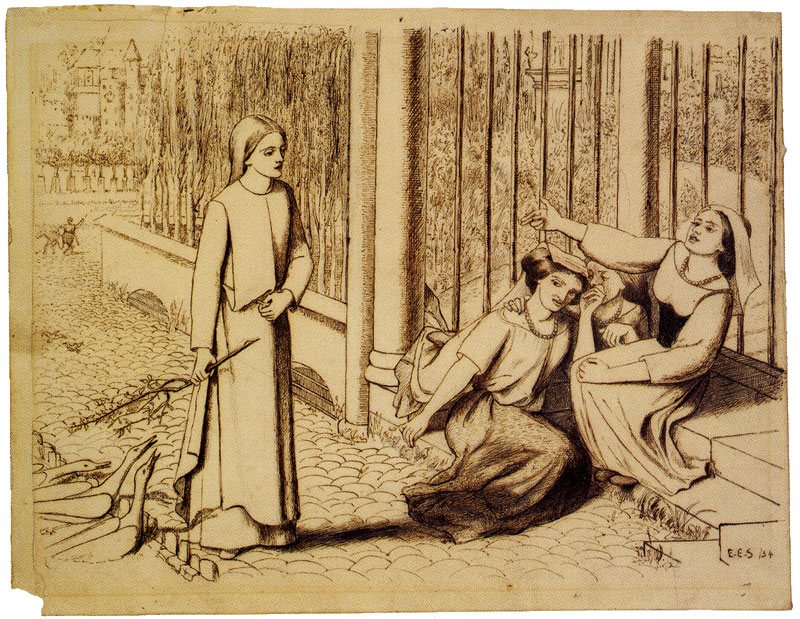
In act III, Pippa passes a group of girls sitting near the Duomo in Asolo, one of whom calls to her, "you may come closer—we shall not eat you!" Drawing by Elizabeth Siddal, 1854.

Pippa Passes is a verse drama by Robert Browning. It was published in 1841 as the first volume of his Bells and Pomegranates series, in a low-priced two-column edition for sixpence, and republished in his collected Poems of 1849, where it received much more critical attention. It was dedicated "most admiringly to the author of Ion", that is, Thomas Noon Talfourd. It is best known for the lines "God's in his heaven— / All's right with the world!"

== Origins ==
The author described the work as "the first of a series of Dramatical Pieces, to come out at intervals". A young, blameless silk-winding girl is wandering innocently through the environs of Asolo, attributing kindness and virtue to the people she passes. She sings as she goes, her song influencing others to act for the good—or, at the least, reminding them of the existence of a moral order. Alexandra Orr described the moment of inspiration:

Mr. Browning was walking alone, in a wood near Dulwich, when the image flashed upon him of some one walking thus alone through life; one apparently too obscure to leave a trace of his or her passage, yet exercising a lasting though unconscious influence at every step of it; and the image shaped itself into the little silk-winder of Asolo, Felippa, or Pippa.

Another source for the work, according to David G. Riede, is that while working on a description of a Paduan peasant girl in book 3 of Sordello (1840), Browning came to the realization "that his art ought not to flatter the pretensions of the great, but to speak for the masses". In a letter to Fanny Haworth, he wrote that the "sad disheveled form" of the girl "wherein I put, comprize, typify and figure to myself Mankind, the whole poor-devildom one sees cuffed and huffed from morn to midnight" had inspired a resolution in him to "keep my pact in mind, prick up my republicanism". Pippa, a working-class girl from Asolo, not far from Padua, was the result of this pact.

== Structure ==
Introduction
The silk-winding girl Pippa rises on New Year's Day, her only day off for the whole year. Her thoughts concern the people she dubs "Asolo's Four Happiest Ones":
- Ottima, the wife of the rich silk-mill owner Luca Gaddi (and the lover of Sebald, a German)
- Jules, a French art student, who is today marrying Phene, a beautiful woman he knows only through her fan letters
- Luigi, an Italian patriot who lives with his mother in the turret on the hill
- Monsignor, a cleric
I.—Morning
Pippa passes a shrubhouse on the hillside, where Sebald and Ottima are trying to justify to each other the murder of Ottima's elderly husband, Luca.
A group of art students, led by Lutwyche, discuss a cruel practical joke they are hoping to play on Jules, of whom they are envious.
II.—Noon
Pippa enters Orcana valley, and passes the house of Jules and Phene, who have been tricked into marriage. (The song they overhear refers to Caterina Cornaro, the Queen of Cyprus.)
The English vagabond Bluphocks watches Luigi's turret in the company of Austrian policemen. The Austrians' suspicions hinge on whether Luigi stays for the night or leaves.
III.—Evening
Pippa passes the turret on the hill. Luigi and his mother discuss his plan to assassinate an Austrian official. (The song they overhear, A king lived long ago (1835), was originally a separate poem by Browning.)
Four poor girls sit on the steps of the cathedral and chatter. At the behest of Bluphocks, they greet Pippa as she goes by.
IV.—Night
Pippa passes the cathedral and palace. Inside, Monsignor negotiates with the Intendant, an assassin named Uguccio. The conversation turns to Pippa, the niece of the cardinal and true owner of the ecclesiastic's property, and Ugo's offer to remove her from Asolo.
Pippa returns to her room.

== Critical reaction ==
The work caused some controversy when it was first published, due to the matter-of-fact portrayals of the more disreputable characters—notably the adulterous Ottima—and for its frankness on sexual matters. In 1849, a writer in The English Review complained:

We have already referred to the two drawbacks, of which we have to complain in particular: the one is the virtual encouragement of regicide, which we trust to see removed from the next edition, being as unnatural as it is immoral: the other is a careless audacity in treating of licentiousness, which in our eyes is highly reprehensible, though it may, no doubt, have been exhibited with a moral intention, and though Mr. Browning may plead the authority of Shakespeare, Goethe, and other great men, in his favour.

However, the work was described by William Kingsland as "perhaps the most beautiful [of Browning's] dramas", presenting a "charming picture of Pippa […] whose song, as she descends like a child-angel into the light of a new morning, with the spring-world bathed in the glory and gold of a blessed sunrise, is"

The year's at the spring
And day's at the morn;
Morning's at seven;
The hill-side's dew-pearled;
The lark's on the wing;
The snail's on the thorn:
God's in his heaven—
All's right with the world!

— from Act I: Morning

The view of Kingsland and other late-Victorian commentators like Stopford Brooke, who wrote that Pippa "passes like an angel by and touches with her wing events and persons and changes them to good", was challenged in the twentieth century. D. C. Wilkinson pointed out that Sebald's reaction to Pippa's song is to express scorn and revulsion of Ottima, "a grand shifting of responsibility" for his own crime; Dale Kramer argued that Pippa's songs "influence people during moments of crisis into performing deeds which seem to abnegate self, but which are on the whole egoistic"; and Jacob Korg synthesized these criticisms into the claim that the effect of Pippa on the other characters is "the sudden recovery of moral awareness". Her songs, Korg says, "enable each character to escape the control of passion, deception, or some other compulsion, and to restore his capacity for exercising enlightened free will and moral judgment", whether for good or evil.

=== Ambiguities ===
Pippa's song influences Luigi to leave that night for Vienna, preserving him from the police. But does he give up his plan to assassinate the Austrian Emperor Franz? In 1848, a reviewer for Sharpe's London Magazine chided Browning for failing to clarify:

We trust that he may be supposed to have abandoned his execrable design. Indeed, we cannot conceive it possible that an author, animated in general by such Christian feelings as Robert Browning, should recommend regicide, in cold blood, as a deed praiseworthy and heroic. But he has erred greatly in leaving the slightest doubt upon such a subject; unless, indeed, our lack of comprehension be alone responsible for the error. But we do not like playing with edged tools.

However, Luigi's line "'Tis God's voice calls: how could I stay?" suggests that "what has come to him is the conviction of the necessity of the assassination." Browning sympathized with the republican cause in Italy, believing that "once the Italians regained liberty and independence, all of the dormant positive qualities that had made them the foremost Eueropean nation during the Renaissance would reawaken", a view he expressed in the poem 'Old Pictures in Florence' (1855), in which the narrator

Shall ponder, once Freedom restored to Florence,
How Art may return that departed with her.

Pippa Passes is a closet drama and many of its actions are told through the characters' speech rather than through stage directions. A consequence of this is that readers have disagreed about the actions of Sebald and Ottima after they hear Pippa's song. Many followed Alexandra Orr, who wrote, "Something in [Pippa's] song strikes [Sebald's] conscience like a thunderbolt, and its reviving force awakens Ottima's also: both are spiritually saved", but J. M. Purcell disagreed, arguing "that Pippa's song has recalled Sebald—but not Ottima, however—to his moral senses; and in his revulsion for his sins of ingratitude, adultery and murder, he kills Ottima and himself."

=== Who will read Browning? ===
Charmed by the character of Pippa, Alfred Noyes pronounced Pippa Passes to be Browning's "most perfect achievement", but even the sentimental passages of the work had not been able to win over all Victorian critics. Walter Besant criticised the work in his 1875 novel With Harp and Crown, singling out "The hill-side's dew-pearled!" ("Was there ever such a stuttering collocation of syllables to confound the reader and utterly destroy a sweet little lyric?") and denying Browning's future appeal:

She had taken a scene from Browning's "Pippa passes," a poem which—if its author had only for once been able to wed melodious verse to the sweetest poetical thought; if he had only tried, just for once, to write lines which should not make the cheeks of those that read them to ache, the front teeth of those who declaim them to splinter and fly, the ears of those that hear them to crack—would have been a thing to rest himself upon for ever, and receive the applause of the world. To the gods it seemed otherwise. Browning, who might have led us like Hamelin the piper, has chosen the worse part. He will be so deeply wise that he cannot express his thought; he will be so full of profundities that he requires a million of lines to express them in; he will leave music and melody to Swinburne; he will leave grace and sweetness to Tennyson; and in fifty years' time, who will read Browning?

=== "A distressing blunder" ===
The play contains an error rooted in Robert Browning's unfamiliarity with vulgar slang. In her closing song, Pippa says:

But at night, brother howlet, over the woods,
Toll the world to thy chantry;
Sing to the bats' sleek sisterhoods
Full complines with gallantry:
Then, owls and bats,
Cowls and twats,
Monks and nuns, in a cloister's moods,
Adjourn to the oak-stump pantry!

— from Act IV: Night, Scene: Pippa's chamber again (emphasis added)

"Twat" was and remains vulgar slang for a woman's external genitalia. But in 1886, Frederick James Furnivall, a contributor to the Oxford English Dictionary, asked the poet for his source, and Browning replied "that he got the word from the Royalist rhymes entitled 'Vanity of Vanities', on Sir Harry Vane's picture" in which Vane is lampooned thus:

They talk't of his having a Cardinalls Hat,
They'd send him as soon an old Nun's Twat

Browning added, "The word struck me as a distinctive part of a nun's attire that might fitly pair off with the cowl appropriated to a monk." The blunder was pointed out by H. W. Fay in 1888.

== Adaptations and influences ==
=== Theatrical productions and films ===
In 1899 the Boston Browning Society staged an adapted version by Helen Archibald Clarke (1860–1926).

An abridgment of Pippa Passes by English actor Henry Miller was premiered at the Majestic Theatre on Broadway on 12 November 1906. It inspired a silent film adaptation starring Gertrude Robinson (and including Mary Pickford in a minor role) which was made in 1909. The film omitted the scenes involving Luigi and the Monsignor, and included a new episode involving a repentant drunkard. It was directed by D. W. Griffith (with cinematography by Arthur Marvin), whose experiments with naturalistic lighting were deemed a great success; he later named it as his greatest film. An adaptation of A Blot in the 'Scutcheon was to follow in 1912, and another Griffith film, The Wanderer (1913) reproduces the theme of Pippa Passes with a flutist instead of a singer.

Ada Galsworthy set Pippa's Song to music, together with In The Doorway, published in 1907.

Pippa Passes was revived at the Neighborhood Playhouse by Alice Lewisohn on 17 November 1918, and was a great success.

=== Other ===
The line "God’s in His heaven, all’s right with the world!" is quoted in the 1908 novel Anne of Green Gables by L.M. Montgomery. It also appears prominently in the 1995 anime Neon Genesis Evangelion, as the slogan of the United Nations agency NERV.

The Kentucky town of Pippa Passes was formally named after the poem, thanks to a grant from the Browning Society.
