= Edward Berdoe =

English writer and physician (1836–1916)

Edward Collis Berdoe
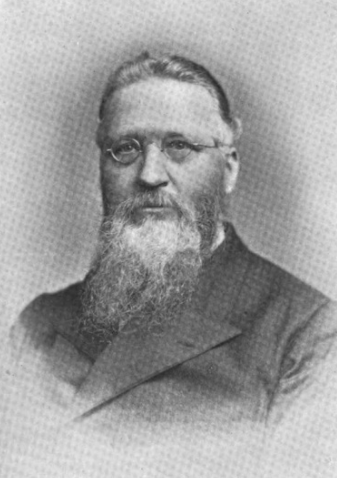
- Born: Edward Collis Berdoe; 7 March 1836; St Pancras, London, England
- Died: 2 March 1916 (aged 79); Hackney, London, England
- Occupation: Physician
- Known for: Medicine, author

Edward Collis Berdoe (7 March 1836 – 2 March 1916) was an English physician, anti-vivisectionist and writer. He studied and wrote on the works of Robert Browning. He also campaigned against medical experiments on human patients and animals.

== Medical career ==
Born in St Pancras, London on 7 March 1836, Berdoe was educated at Regent's Park College, presumably as a lay student rather than a candidate for the Baptist ministry. While working in an apothecary's shop in Reading, he took up photography. There is an Edward Berdoe recorded as serving in a medical capacity during the Crimean War and later in the American Civil War, which ended in 1865, but this is likely to be a namesake, as the physician Edward Berdoe was developing his career in pharmacy and raising a family in England in those times.

Berdoe gained medical qualifications at the Royal London Hospital and was admitted as an LRCPE (Licentiate of the Royal College of Physicians of Edinburgh), an LSA (Licentiate of the Worshipful Society of Apothecaries) in 1876, and an MRCS (Member of the Royal College of Surgeons) in 1877. He spent the rest of his life as a general practitioner in Hackney, where he died on 2 March 1916, just before his 80th birthday.

== Literary researches ==
In the 1880s, Berdoe became a prominent student of the works of Robert Browning, sitting on the committee of the London Browning Society from its foundation in 1881 to its dissolution in 1894. Over the years he published a series of works to help readers understand the poet's ideas, such as The Browning Cyclopaedia, which was to be reprinted in England and the United States in the 20th century.

== Patient and animal welfare ==
Two aspects of medical practice in Berdoe's time drew him into campaigning for change in the treatment of patients and animals. One was the use for experiments in teaching hospitals of poor patients unable to afford private treatment. This he viewed as callous and cruel, and wrote a novel against it under the pseudonym Aesculapius Scalpel. A follow-up exposed the abuses dramatically.

An allied subject on which he wrote extensively was animal welfare, notably vivisection. He served as editor of a magazine, The Zoophilist, published by what became the National Anti-Vivisection Society. Among other works, he collaborated in 1893 with the Society's founder, Frances Power Cobbe, on an exposé entitled Nine Circles, or The Torture of the Innocent.

Berdoe was on the Central Executive Committee of the Victoria Street and International Society for the Protection of Animals from Vivisection.

== Family ==
In 1858 Berdoe was married in Hastings to Mary Inskipp. They had two sons and four daughters. A lifelong teetotaller and vegetarian, his immersion in Browning's writings led him to seek greater knowledge of the Roman Catholic Church, which he joined in 1890.

== Selected publications ==
- St. Bernard's: The Romance of a Medical Student (1888)
- Dying Scientifically: A Key to St. Bernard's (1888)
- The Futility of Experiments With Drugs on Animals (1889)
- The Healing Art and the Claims of Vivisection (1890)
- The Origin and Growth of the Healing Art (1893)
- Browning's Message to His Time: His Religion, Philosophy, and Science (1893)
- The Browning Cyclopædia, A Guide to the Study of the Works of Robert Browning (1897)
- A Catechism of Vivisection (1903)
