= Alice Lloyd College =

Private work college in Pippa Passes, Kentucky, US

Coordinates: 37°20′9.3″N 82°52′24.94″W

- Former name: Caney Junior College (1923–1962)
- Type: Private college
- Established: 1923; 103 years ago
- Endowment: $43.0 million (2018)
- President: Charles Marshall
- Students: 570
- Location: Pippa Passes, Kentucky, United States
- Campus: Rural, 175 acres (0.71 km²)
- Colors: Blue & White
- Nickname: Eagles
- Sporting affiliations: NCCAA; USCAA
- Mascot: Talon
- Website: alc.edu

Alice Lloyd College is a private work college in Pippa Passes, Kentucky, United States. It was co-founded by the journalist Alice Spencer Geddes Lloyd (a native of Cambridge, Massachusetts) and June Buchanan (a native of New York) in 1923, at first under the name of Caney Junior College. Founded as an institution to educate leaders in Appalachia locally, it became a bachelor's degree-granting institution in the early 1980s. Alice Lloyd College is accredited by the Southern Association of Colleges and Schools (SACS).

== Academics ==
As of 2024, Alice Lloyd College has implemented 18 major degree programs and eight pre-professional programs into its curricula. The student-to-faculty ratio is 14.5:1 with an average class size of 18.

== Rankings and reputation ==
Alice Lloyd College was ranked number 7 in Regional Colleges South and number 2 in Best Value Schools, as of the 2018 edition of U.S. News & World Report's rankings.

In the 2022 edition of U.S. News rankings, Alice Lloyd College was ranked number 21 in Regional Colleges South and number 5 in Best Value Schools.

== Student finances and required work ==
Although Alice Lloyd College does not rely on any direct financial support from the state or federal governments, it does accept students using federal and state student financial aid such as federal Pell Grants. Students are required to work part-time regardless of financial situation. They are given jobs such as janitorial staff, office assistant, tutor, craft maker, resident advisor, maintenance, grounds or working in the cafeteria (Hunger Din). In addition to on-campus jobs, students can work at off-campus outreach projects. Students are required to work at least 160 hours per semester. The college is one of nine work colleges in the United States and one of two in Kentucky (Berea College being the other) that have mandatory work-study programs.

Students from 108 counties in the Appalachian Mountains region of Kentucky, Ohio, Tennessee, Virginia and West Virginia pay no tuition through the Appalachian Leaders College Scholarship.

== Student life ==
The dormitories house about 600 students, with rental prices averaging $1,900 annually. Alice Lloyd College requires students to live in gender-separated dormitories and only allows the opposite sex into a gender-specific dorm during "open houses," after room checks have been made. Men's dorms are designed for 2 residents but because of allowing over enrollment, all rooms have been forced to house 3 residents per room and has caused a shortage of furniture and space. Employees and faculty live on campus including in the dorms with students. Parking is a little over a mile walk and sits off campus down the road completely out of view of campus. Despite classes running until 9pm, shuttles stop running at 6pm and do not operate on weekends. Room checks consist of two resident advisors going into each room and making sure that it is clean and it does not contain any illegal substances. The college is located in Knott County, Kentucky, a dry county, thus alcoholic beverages are prohibited.

Professional dress is required of all students on central campus until 2:00 p.m. every Tuesday and for all convocation programs.

While this college is not affiliated with any religious denomination, the college's mission statement emphasizes the role of Christian values. In addition, the college offers coursework in religion and has a chapter of Baptist Collegiate Ministries.

The college choir is called the "Voices of Appalachia." The choir, formed in 1962, holds a tour annually in the spring, performing hymns and ballads. The choir has made several media appearances, including NBC's Today and CBS News Sunday Morning.

The college offers a series of speakers and events called convocations. Students are required to attend six convocations per semester.

== Campus ==
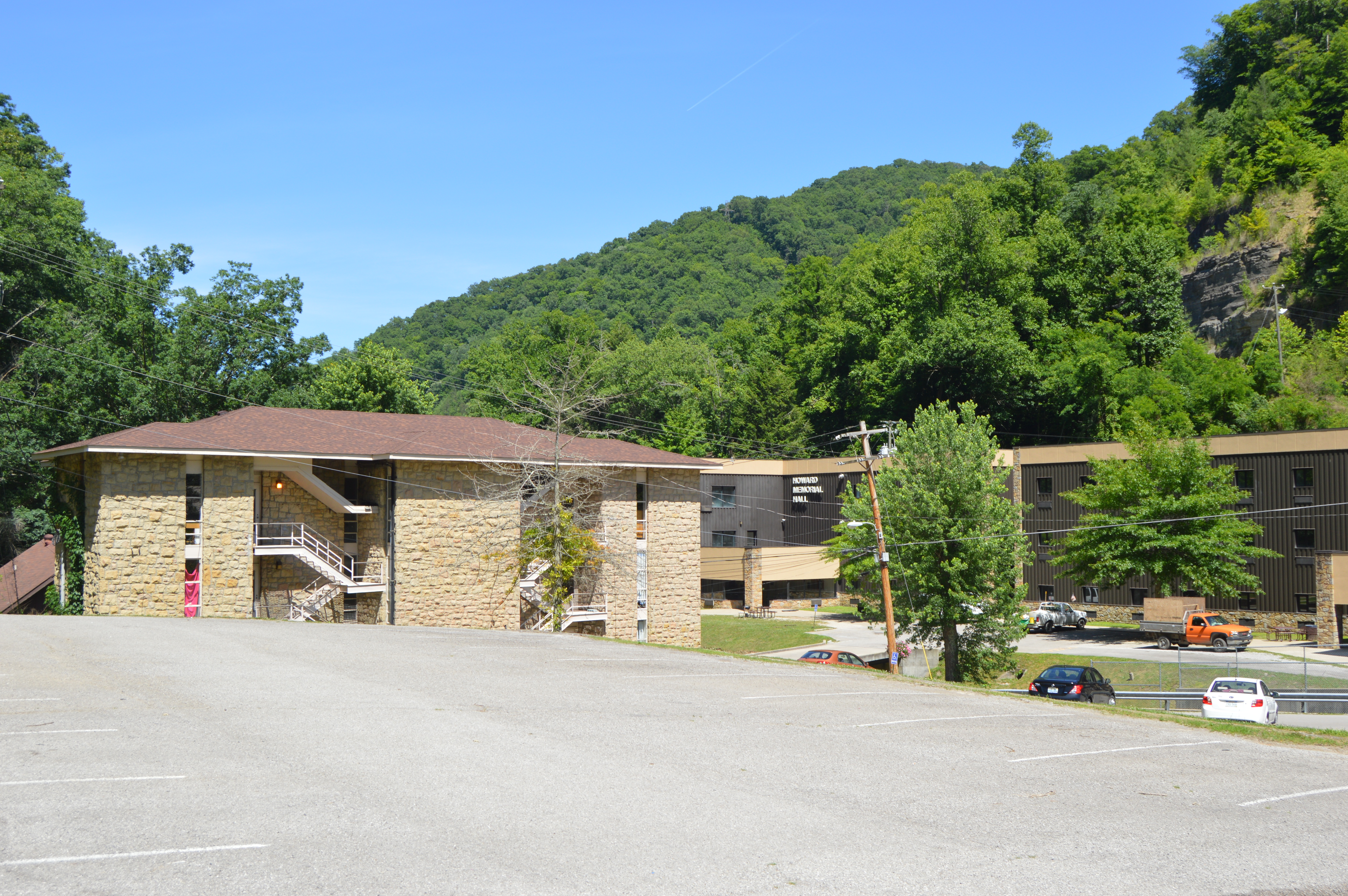
Alice Lloyd buildings

The Commodore Slone Building, at one time housing the science program and most recently the June Buchanan School, the college's K-12 prep school, was renovated to house the business program. The Business & Technology Center was completed in the fall of 2009 and was dedicated on October 10, 2009.

== Caney Cottage Scholarship ==
The college owns the H.N. and Frances C. Berger Residence Hall, also known as Caney Cottage, an apartment complex near the campus of the University of Kentucky in Lexington. Students who graduate from Alice Lloyd and are accepted into the University of Kentucky's graduate school can apply to live in the Caney Cottage rent, utility and parking free. Those who attend other graduate schools can apply for cash scholarships that go toward tuition costs. After graduate school, scholarship recipients must commit to service in the Appalachian region.

== Presidents ==
Since the death of Alice Lloyd in 1962, seven men have taken the position of president of Alice Lloyd College:

Year	Name	Notes
1963–77	William S. Hayes	
1977–88	Jerry C. Davis	Subsequently president of the College of the Ozarks
1988–95	M. Fred Mullinax	Executive vice-president of the College of the Ozarks
1995–99	Timothy T. Siebert	
1999–2022	Joe Alan Stepp	First native of Appalachia to become ALC's president
2022–2026	Jim O. Stepp	Previous executive Vice President for ALC
2026–present	Charles Marshall	First Alice Lloyd College graduate to assume presidency of the college

== Athletics ==
The Alice Lloyd athletic teams are called the Eagles. The college is a member of the National Christian College Athletic Association (NCCAA), primarily competing as an independent in the Mid-East Region of the Division I level. The Eagles also compete as an Independent within the United States Collegiate Athletic Association (USCAA) since the 2026–27 academic year. Alice Lloyd previously competed as an Independent within the Continental Athletic Conference (CAC) of the National Association of Intercollegiate Athletics (NAIA) during the 2025–26 school year, and as a member of the River States Conference (RSC) from 2005–06 to 2024–25; with a previous tenure from 1983–84 to 1991–92.

Alice Lloyd competes in 15 intercollegiate athletic sports: Men's sports include baseball, basketball, cross country, golf, soccer, and track & field (indoor and outdoor). Women's sports include basketball, cheerleading, cross country, soccer, softball, track & field (indoor and outdoor), and volleyball. Club sports include bass fishing, eSports, and men's & women's tennis.

=== Accomplishments ===
In 2021, the Alice Lloyd College women's basketball team won the first national championship of any sport in school history, winning the 2021 NCCAA National Tournament.

== Notable alumni ==
- Carl D. Perkins, politician
- Preston Spradlin, college basketball coach

== See also ==
- June Buchanan School, a K-12 prep school on the campus
- WWJD-FM, owned and operated by the college
