= June Buchanan =

American educator (1887–1988)

- Born: June 21, 1887; Moravia, New York
- Died: May 31, 1988 (aged 100); Martin, Kentucky
- Education: Syracuse University, Wellesley College

June Buchanan (June 21, 1887 – May 31, 1988) was an American educator from upstate New York. She co-founded Alice Lloyd College in Pippa Passes, Kentucky, with Alice Spencer Geddes Lloyd, aiming to provide a better education for the youth of Appalachia.

== Early life ==
Buchanan was born in Moravia, New York, on June 21, 1887. Her parents, Frank Buchanan and Julia McCormick Buchanan, hailed from small towns near Syracuse. Many of the skills that she later applied to her mission, Buchanan learned from watching her parents. Her mother was an active member of their church, inspiring Buchanan to participate in advocacy as she got older. The men in her family taught her the financial literacy that later supported her role at the college.

== Education ==
Buchanan graduated from Syracuse University in 1913 with a Bachelor of Arts degree. After teaching in Groton, New York, she pursued graduate studies at Wellesley College, with a focus on liberal arts; however, she did not officially complete a graduate program. While at Wellesley, she encountered fellow students who heard of Alice Spencer Geddes Lloyd's efforts to educate children in the Appalachian Mountains of Knott County, Kentucky. She wrote to Lloyd regarding her work and shortly thereafter moved to Kentucky to assist in the development of what became Alice Lloyd College.

== Career ==
In January 1919, she arrived in Pippa Passes to assist Lloyd's efforts at the Caney Creek Community Center. In 1923, she and Lloyd chartered Caney Junior College, which would be renamed Alice Lloyd College upon Lloyd's death in 1962. In 1976, a campus building, the June Buchanan Alumni Center, was named in her honor. Buchanan's early contributions to Alice Lloyd college were in the classroom through the development of teaching programs to improve the education of the students of Appalachia. As her involvement in the school increased, and Lloyd's trust in her grew, Buchanan took control of the finances of the organization and implemented the tools she learned from her father. The college's K-12 prep school, the June Buchanan School, was named in her honor in 1984. Her service to Appalachia was not limited to the school; she also served as the mayor of Pippa Passes.

== Death and legacy ==
Buchanan continued to serve the college until her death in May 1988. She died at a hospital in the city of Martin in neighboring Floyd County. In addition to the June Buchanan School, and the June Buchanan Alumni Center named in her honor, the June Buchanan Medical Clinic, a community health clinic owned and operated by the University of Kentucky's Centers for Excellence in Rural Health, is located in Hindman, the county seat of Knott County.
