= Baptist Collegiate Network =

North American student organization

- Abbreviation: BCN
- Founded: 1919
- Founded at: Baptist General Convention of Texas
- Type: Service and Social
- Members: 69,500
- Parent organization: Southern Baptist Convention
- Subsidiaries: 839
- Website: Official website

The Baptist Collegiate Network (BCN) is a Baptist college-level organization that can be found on many college campuses in the United States and Canada; many of its collegiate ministries operate under the name Baptist Collegiate Ministry or the Baptist Student Union. The organization, while Baptist, functions as an interdenominational and coeducational fellowship, student society and service organization. Baptist Collegiate Network is primarily associated with the Southern Baptist Convention.

== History ==
The organization was founded as the Baptist Student Union in 1919 by the Baptist General Convention of Texas. Joseph P. Boone, a Baylor University graduate, was the first secretary. In 1920, the first state-wide convocation members was held at Howard Payne University in Brownwood, Texas. 300 students from twenty schools came for the development of programs. Churches and state conventions were deemed crucial to its growth.

In 2012, the network had more than 69,500 students actively involved in campus ministry through this organization and its affiliated state-level Baptist conventions, in 839 college and university campuses; 782 of these are in the United States and 57 are in Canada.
