= Alexandra Orr =

English biographer

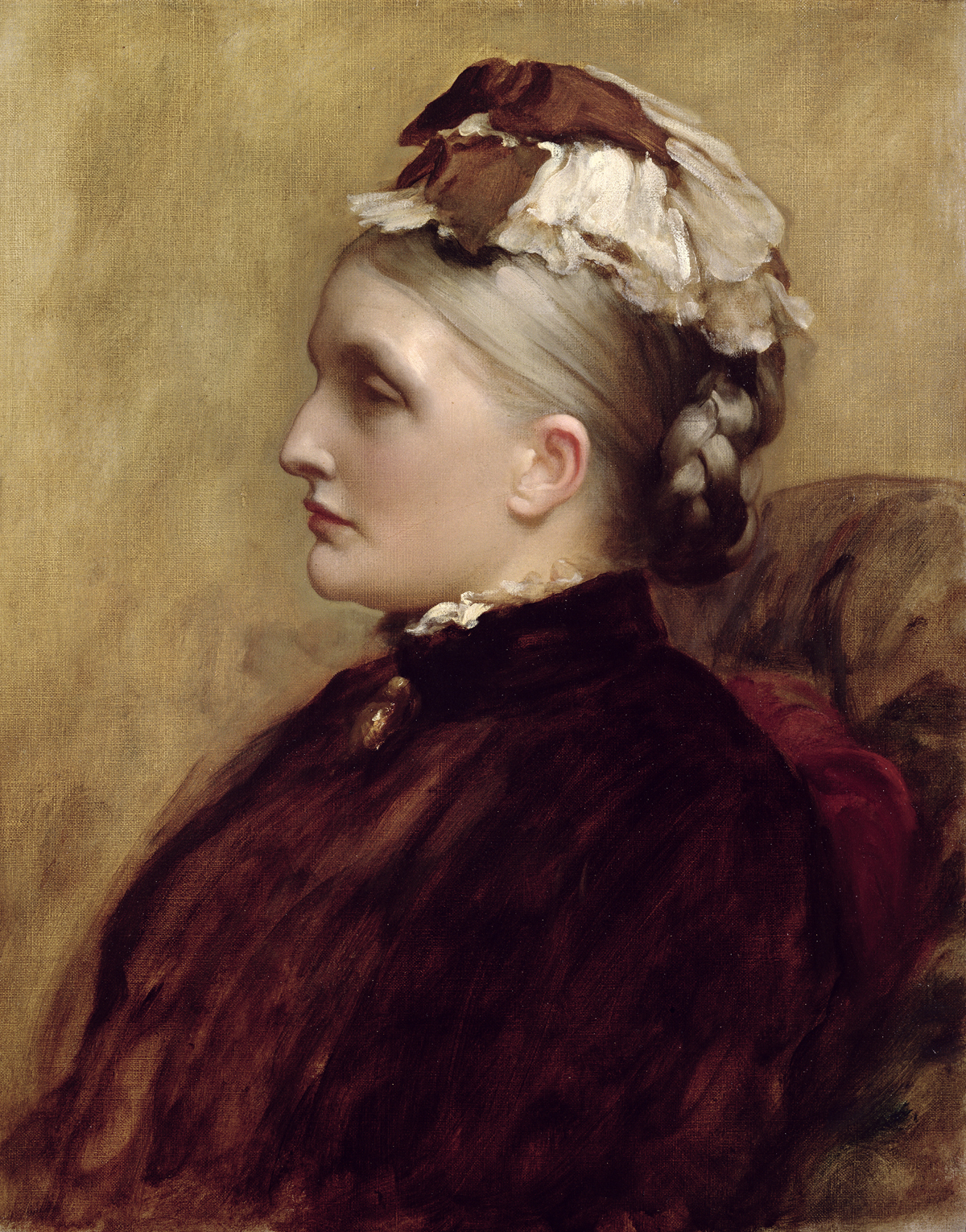
- in 1892 by Frederic Leighton
- Born: Alexandra Leighton; 23 November 1828; Saint Petersburg, Russian Empire
- Died: 23 August 1903 (aged 74); London, England
- Known for: Biography of Robert Browning
- Spouse: Sutherland G. G. Orr (m. 1857; died 1858)
- Relatives: Frederic Leighton (brother)

Alexandra Sutherland Orr (née Leighton; 23 November 1828 – 23 August 1903) was an English scholar of the life and works of Robert Browning. She modelled for her brother Frederic Leighton in at least two paintings.

== Life ==
Alexandra Orr was born in Saint Petersburg in 1828, because her paternal grandfather Sir James Boniface Leighton was Emperor Nicholas I of Russia's physician.

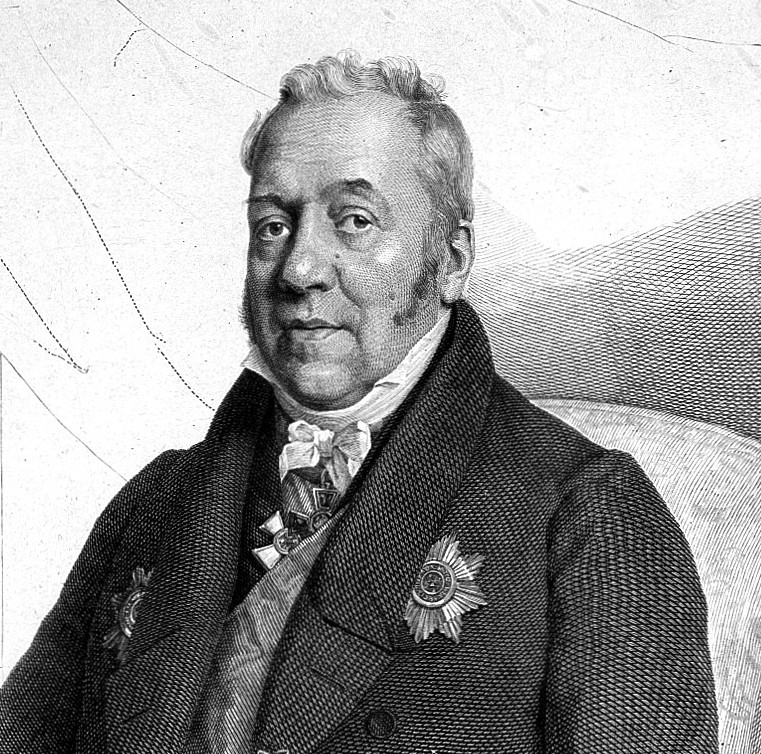
Sir James Boniface Leighton

Orr had one sister, Augusta and an elder brother, Frederic. Her parents were Augusta Susan and Frederic Septimus Leighton who was also a medical doctor. Her grandfather's dealing's in Russia gave his family financial independence. Empress Alexandra was her godmother.

She was educated as her family travelled in Europe. When she was sixteen she lost some of her sight due to rheumatic fever. After this she had to have books read to her and to use an amanuensis. In 1855 she met her brother in Paris and she was introduced to his good friend, the poet Robert Browning.

She went to India as the wife of Sutherland George Gordon Orr who led the 3rd regiment of cavalry. They had married on 7 March 1857, and arrived as the Indian mutiny took place. Sheikh Baran Bukh is given the credit for her survival. Her husband was involved in numerous operations where the British officers were trying to establish order with Indian troops. The mutiny led to her husband's death.

Hence known as Mrs Sutherland Orr, she returned to her parents who were living in Sunderland or Bath. Her portrait by her brother Frederic Leighton was exhibited at the Royal Academy in 1861.

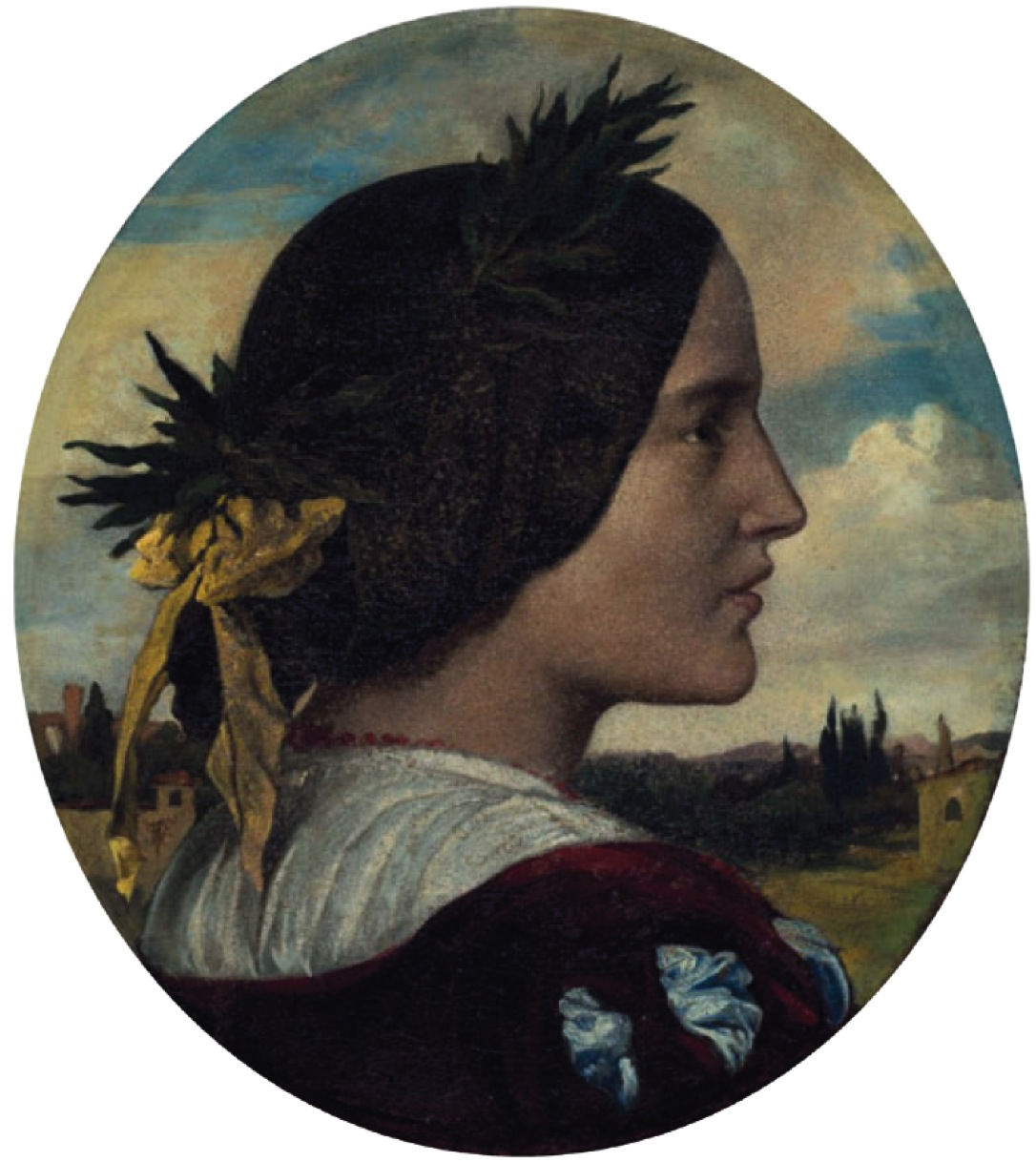
"Portrait of Alexandra Leighton (later Mrs. Sutherland Orr)" 1853 by Frederic Leighton

In 1869 she and her parents were living in London. Orr's friends were interested in art and literature and she cemented her friendship with Robert Browning. Browning would read to her twice a week and she joined and donated money to the Browning Society. Encouraged by the society she created a Handbook to the Works of Robert Browning assisted by advice from the animal artist John Trivett Nettleship.

She was given access to Browning's letters by his sister and in 1891 she published Life and Letters of Robert Browning. The following year she re-published what became the sixth edition of Handbook to the Works of Robert Browning which contained her corrections.

Orr published other smaller works including a description of the Browning's religious beliefs and articles against the proposal of Women's suffrage. Her essay on The Future of English Women caused much debate and caused Millicent Fawcett to publish The Future of Englishwomen: A reply. Orr died at what had been her parents' house at 11 Kensington Park Gardens on 23 August 1903.

== Legacy ==
Her brother's house became the Leighton Museum at her insistence. Her portraits are in the National Portrait Gallery in London. An 1892 portrait by her brother is at Leighton Museum.

== List of works ==
- A handbook to the works of Robert Browning (1885)
- Life and letters of Robert Browning (1891)
- Addresses delivered to the students of the Royal Academy by the late Lord Leighton (1896; editor)
