= Browning Society =

Society for discussing Robert Browning's works

Browning societies were groups who met to discuss the works of Robert Browning. Emerging from various reading groups, the societies indicated the poet's fame, and unusually were forming in his lifetime. Browning was not consulted on their foundation and the idea did not meet with his immediate approval.

== History ==
The earliest Browning Society, and longest continuing, was constituted in 1877 by Hiram Corson at Cornell University. The Boston Browning Society followed in 1885, which would become the largest and most influential. By 1900 there were hundreds of such groups across the United States, Canada and the British Isles.

The most notable Browning Society was established in London in 1881 by Frederick James Furnivall and Emily Hickey. Meeting monthly at University College London, it extended Browning's readership by publishing study aids for his works, along with cheaper editions and encouragement for amateur productions of his plays. Although the relationship with the society was often fraught, Browning recognised its role in his success.

Alexandra Orr who would become Robert Browning's biographer met Browning twice a week and she joined and donated money to the society. Encouraged by the society she created a Handbook to the Works of Robert Browning assisted by advice from the animal artist John Trivett Nettleship who had written some of the earliest work about Browning. Also prominent throughout its existence was the physician and author Edward Berdoe.

== In fiction ==
- Arthur Conan Doyle (2004) A Duet with an Occasional Chorus Kessinger Publishing. ISBN 1-4179-5932-0. Chapter XVI is set around the politics in a Browning Society.
