= Pippa Passes, Kentucky =

City in Kentucky, United States

- City
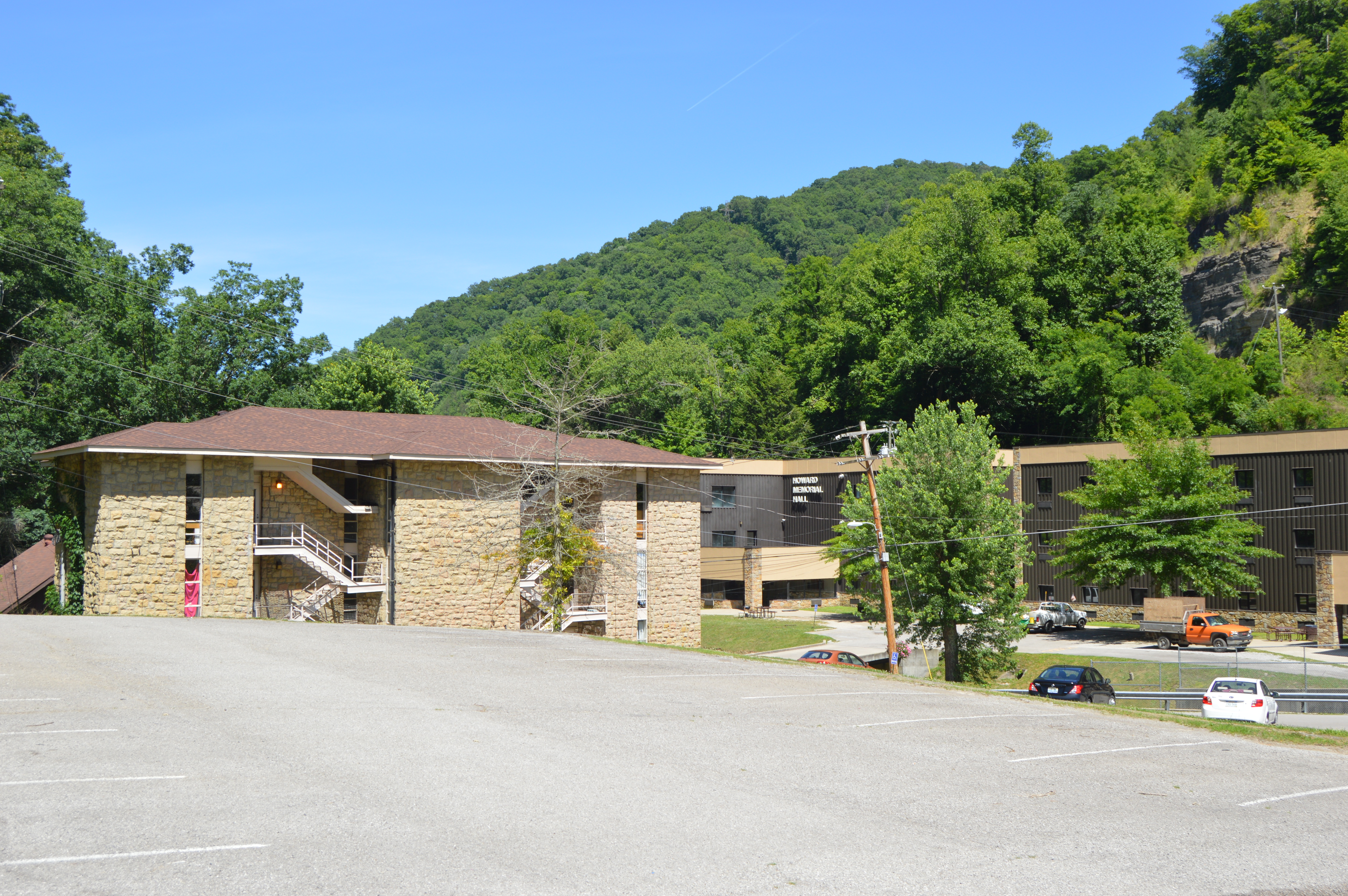
- Buildings on the Alice Lloyd campus
- Nicknames: Caney, Caney Creek
- Location in Knott County, Kentucky
- Coordinates: 37°20′5″N 82°52′32″W
- Country: United States
- State: Kentucky
- County: Knott
- Incorporated: 1983
- Named for: a Robert Browning poem

Area
  - Total: 0.44 sq mi (1.15 km^{2})
  - Land: 0.44 sq mi (1.15 km^{2})
  - Water: 0 sq mi (0.00 km^{2})
- Elevation: 991 ft (302 m)

Population (2020)
  - Total: 468
  - Density: 1,049.9/sq mi (405.36/km^{2})
- Time zone: UTC-5 (Eastern (EST))
  - Summer (DST): UTC-4 (EDT)
- ZIP code: 41844
- Area code: 606
- FIPS code: 21-61374
- GNIS feature ID: 0500757

Pippa Passes is a city in Knott County, eastern Kentucky, United States. Its formal name was chosen to honor benefactors of Alice Lloyd College. Residents commonly call the community "Caney" or "Caney Creek". As of the 2020 census, Pippa Passes had a population of 468. The small city is located in the mountainous Appalachia region, an area of coal mining.

== History ==
This settlement was known as "Caney" or "Caney Creek" before 1916, when Alice Lloyd arrived from Boston, Massachusetts. She solicited funds for the construction of a local post office and the founding of Caney Creek Junior College, which were opened in 1917 and 1923, respectively.

Members of the Methodist church were active in what they called Home Missionary work in Pippa Passes around 1930. They performed a "missionary play" about the town in Princeton, New Jersey in 1930.

A donation from the Browning Society led to the post office's being named after Robert Browning's Pippa Passes. In this verse drama, he coined the phrase "God's in His heaven, all's right with the world." The U.S. Postal Service's official name for this location was "Pippapass" until 1955.

The city of Pippa Passes was incorporated by the state assembly on July 1, 1983.

== Government ==
It is governed by a mayor elected at-large and a city council whose members are elected from single-member districts. As of 2009, the mayor is Scott Cornett. He is the baseball and basketball coach for the college. The local police department operates as a combined unit with the college's security organization.

== Geography ==
Pippa Passes is in eastern Knott County at 37°20′5″N 82°52′32″W (37.334629, -82.875490), in the valley of the Caney Fork. Kentucky Route 899 passes through the community, leading northeast down the valley of the Caney Fork 11 miles (18 km) to Wayland and southwest then northwest 8 miles (13 km) to Hindman, the Knott county seat.

According to the United States Census Bureau, the city of Pippa Passes has a total area of 0.44 square miles (1.15 km^{2}), all of it recorded as land. The Caney Fork flows northeast to the Right Fork of Beaver Creek near Wayland and is part of the Levisa Fork watershed.

== Demographics ==
Historical population
Census	Pop.	Note	%±
1990	195		—
2000	297		52.3%
2010	533		79.5%
2020	468		−12.2%
U.S. Decennial Census

As of the census of 2010, there were 533 people, 44 households, and 26 families residing in the city. 439 people (82% of the population) lived in group quarters, i.e. college dormitories. The population density was 1,196 inhabitants per square mile (462/km^{2}). The racial makeup of the city was 97.2% White, 1.3% African American, 0.6% Asian, 0.6% Native Hawaiian or Pacific Islander, and 0.4% from two or more races.

Of the 44 households in the city, 34.1% had children under the age of 18 living with them, 40.9% were headed by married couples living together, 9.1% had a female householder with no husband present, and 40.9% were non-families. 11.3% of households were someone living alone who was 65 years of age or older. The average household size was 2.14, and the average family size was 2.88.

5.1% of the city population were under the age of 18, 74.8% were from 18 to 24, 7.6% were from 25 to 44, 9.6% were from 45 to 64, and 2.8% were 65 years of age or older. The median age was 20.7 years. For every 100 females, there were 100.4 males. For every 100 females age 18 and over, there were 99.2 males.

For the period 2013–17, the estimated median annual income for a household in the city was $65,500, and the median income for a family was $76,250. Male full-time workers had a median income of $33,750 versus $21,591 for females. The per capita income for the city, including the non-household population, was $9,432.
