= Kentucky Route 160 =

State highway in Kentucky, United States

Kentucky Route 160
- KY 160 highlighted in red

Route information
- Maintained by KYTC
- Length: 61.146 mi (98.405 km)

Major junctions
- South end: SR 160 near Appalachia, VA
- US 119 in Cumberland; KY 80 near Hindman
- North end: KY 1087 in Vest

Location
- Country: United States
- State: Kentucky
- Counties: Harlan, Letcher, Knott

Highway system
- Kentucky State Highway System; Interstate; US; State; Parkways
| ← KY 159 | → KY 161 |

Kentucky Route 160, also known as KY 160, is a state highway in the U.S. state of Kentucky. It runs from the Virginia state line, where the roadway continues east to Appalachia, Virginia as State Route 160, north via Lynch, Benham, Clutts, Cumberland, Sand Hill, Gordon, Linefork, Kings Creek, Premium, and Hot Spot to Kentucky Route 15 at Van. KY 160 overlaps KY 15 through Isom to Cody, where it splits to run via Carr Creek, Brinkley, and Hindman, ending at Kentucky Route 1087 at Vest. Due to the mountainous terrain and numerous tight bends. KY 160 is signposted closed to tractor-trailers from Lynch to the Virginia state line.

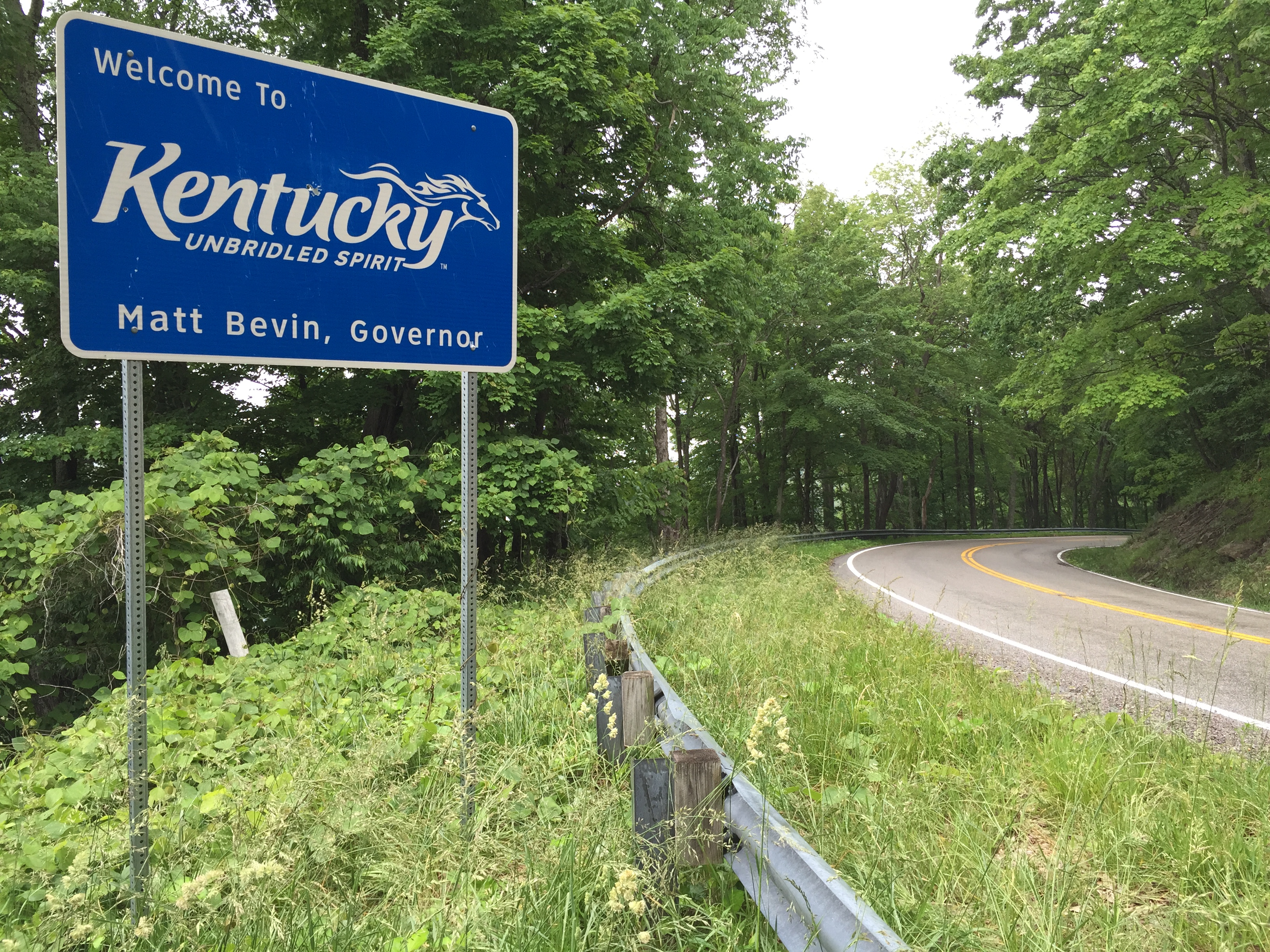
View north at the south end of KY 160 at SR 160 at the Virginia state line in Harlan County

KY 160 is part of the State Primary System from Virginia to the U.S. Highway 119 interchange in Cumberland, the State Secondary System from US 119 to KY 15 at Van and from KY 15 at Cody to Kentucky Route 80 north of Hindman, and the Rural Secondary System from KY 80 to KY 1087 at Vest.

== Major intersections ==
| County | Location | mi | km | Destinations | Notes |
|---|---|---|---|---|---|
| Harlan | Black Mountain | | | SR 160 east | Virginia state line |
| Harlan | Cumberland | | | US 119 | interchange |
| Harlan | Cumberland | | | KY 1254 east | |
| Harlan | Cumberland | | | West Main Street (KY 2179 south) | |
| Harlan | Sand Hill | | | KY 522 south | |
| Letcher | | | | Little Shepherd Trail | former KY 1679 west |
| Letcher | | | | Little Shepherd Trail | former KY 1679 east |
| Letcher | Gordon | | | KY 463 north – Leatherwood | |
| Letcher | Linefork | | | KY 1103 north – Lilley Cornett Woods | |
| Letcher | Kings Creek | | | KY 931 north | |
| Letcher | | | | KY 588 west – Blackey | south end of KY 588 overlap |
| Letcher | Roxana | | | KY 2036 north | |
| Letcher | Premium | | | KY 588 east – Uz | north end of KY 588 overlap |
| Letcher | Van | | | KY 15 south / KY 1811 north – Whitesburg | south end of KY 15 overlap |
| Letcher | | | | KY 1148 east – Colson | |
| Letcher | Isom | | | KY 7 north – Deane, Mountain Motor Speedway | south end of KY 7 overlap |
| Letcher | | | | KY 7 south – Letcher, Blackey, Leatherwood Battlefield, Brashearville | north end of KY 7 overlap |
| Knott | | | | KY 15 north (Smithboro Road) – Hazard, Carr Creek State Park, Carr Creek Dam | north end of KY 15 overlap |
| Knott | Littcarr | | | KY 1410 east (Burgeys Creek Road) | |
| Knott | | | | KY 582 east | |
| Knott | Brinkley | | | KY 899 north – Alice Lloyd College, Mallie | |
| Knott | | | | KY 3391 south | |
| Knott | Hindman | | | KY 550 west – Dwarf | south end of KY 550 overlap |
| Knott | Hindman | | | KY 550 east | north end of KY 550 overlap |
| Knott | | | | KY 2759 south (Ogden Branch Road) | |
| Knott | | | | KY 80 – Hazard, Prestonsburg | |
| Knott | Vest | | | KY 1087 | |
1.000 mi = 1.609 km; 1.000 km = 0.621 mi
