= Kentucky Route 588 =

State highway in Kentucky, United States

Kentucky Route 588
- KY 588 highlighted in red

Route information
- Maintained by KYTC
- Length: 13.649 mi (21.966 km)

Major junctions
- West end: KY 7 in Blackey
- East end: KY 931 near Ice

Location
- Country: United States
- State: Kentucky
- Counties: Letcher

Highway system
- Kentucky State Highway System; Interstate; US; State; Parkways
← KY 587	→ KY 589

Kentucky Route 588 (KY 588) is a 13.7-mile-long (22.0 km) state highway in Letcher County, Kentucky, that runs from KY 7 in Blackey to KY 931 at Ice via Blackey and Roxana.

== Major intersections ==
The entire route is in Letcher County.

Location	mi	km	Destinations	Notes
	0.000	0.000	KY 7	Western terminus
North Fork Kentucky River	0.024	0.039	PFC L.D. Back Memorial Bridge (one lane bridge)	
	5.009	8.061	KY 160 south	West end of KY 160 overlap
North Fork Kentucky River	5.029	8.093	Fireman 1st Class Raleigh Fields Memorial Bridge (one lane bridge)	
Roxana	5.063	8.148	KY 2036 north	Southern terminus of KY 2036
	7.461	12.007	KY 160 north	East end of KY 160 overlap
	11.447	18.422	KY 3401 north (Uz-Dry Fork Road)	Southern terminus of KY 3401
Ice	13.649	21.966	KY 931 (Whitco Road)	Eastern terminus
1.000 mi = 1.609 km; 1.000 km = 0.621 mi: Concurrency terminus
