= Clutts =

Clutts may refer to:

- Clutts, Kentucky, a community in Harlan County
- Tyler Clutts, an American football fullback
- The Clutts House, a historic residence in Wellston, Jackson County, Ohio
