= Virginia State Route 160 =

State highway in Wise County, Virginia, US

State Route 160
- Trail of the Lonesome Pine

Route information
- Maintained by VDOT
- Length: 8.02 mi (12.91 km)
- Existed: 1940–present
- Tourist routes: Virginia Byway

Major junctions
- West end: KY 160 on Black Mountain
- East end: SR 68 in Appalachia

Location
- Country: United States
- State: Virginia
- Counties: Wise

Highway system
- Virginia Routes; Interstate; US; Primary; Secondary; Byways; History; HOT lanes
← SR 159	→ SR 161

State Route 160 (SR 160) is a primary state highway in the U.S. state of Virginia. Known as the Trail of the Lonesome Pine, the state highway runs 8.02 miles (12.91 km) from the Kentucky state line on top of Black Mountain, where the highway continues north as Kentucky Route 160 (KY 160), east to SR 68 in Appalachia. Due to the mountainous terrain and numerous tight bends, Virginia State Route 160 and its Kentucky State Route 160 counterpart are signposted closed to tractor-trailers between Lynch, KY and Appalachia, VA.

== Route description ==
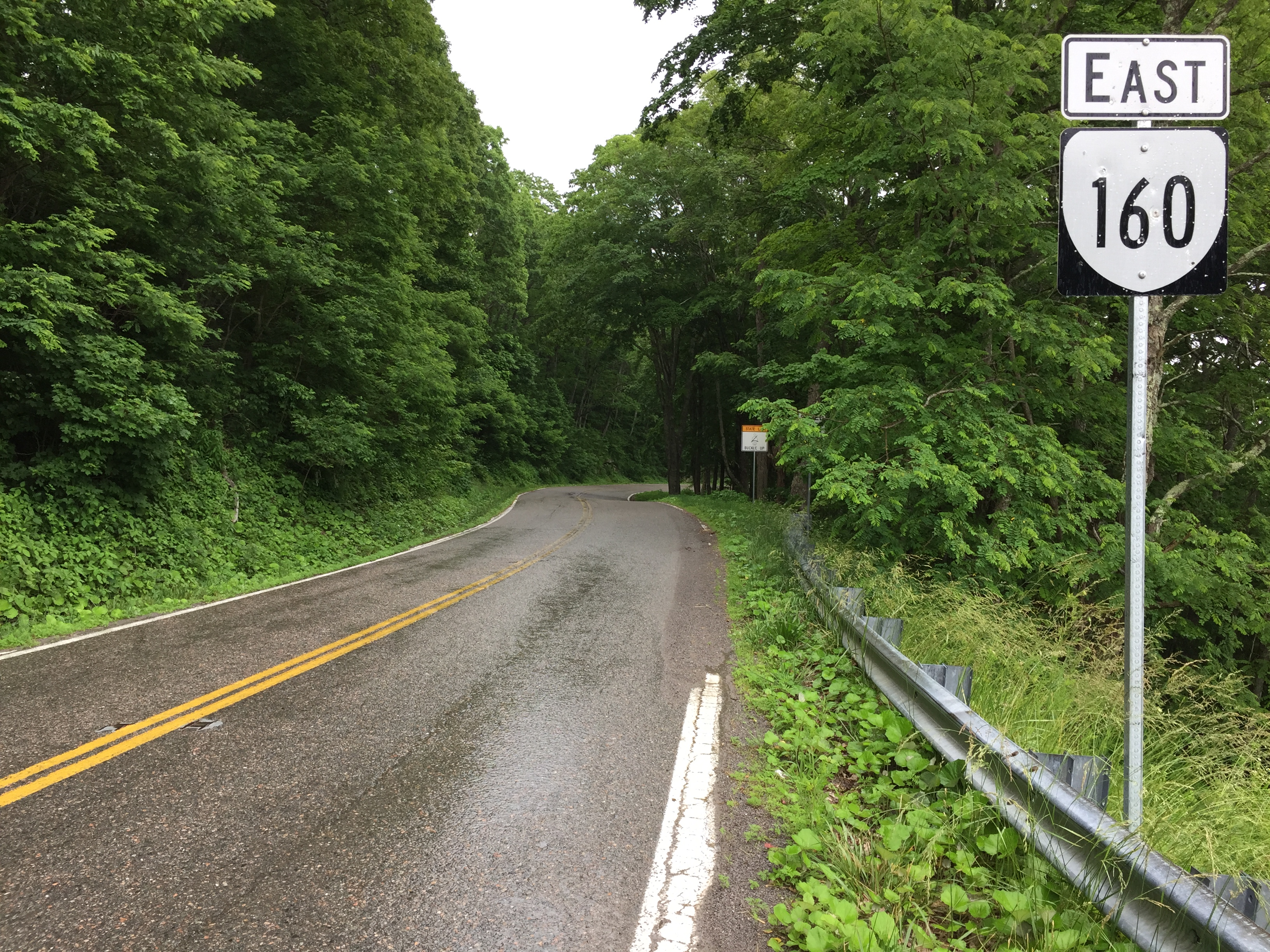
View east at the west end of SR 160 at KY 160 at the Kentucky state line on Black Mountain

SR 160 begins on top of Black Mountain at the Kentucky state line, which follows the Tennessee Valley Divide. The highest elevation in Kentucky can be accessed by following Black Mountain Ridge Road, which intersects KY 160 just west of the state line, to the summit of the mountain. SR 160 has a winding descent featuring several hairpin turn to the valley of Looney Creek, which the highway follows east toward Appalachia. The state highway enters the town shortly before reaching its eastern terminus at its intersection with SR 68 (Exeter Road), which itself reaches its terminus at U.S. Route 23 Business (Main Street) at the southern edge of downtown Appalachia.

== History ==
SR 160 was initially numbered State Route 115 in the 1923 renumbering as a spur from State Route 11 in Appalachia. This road, known as the Lynch Highway (as it led to Lynch, Kentucky), was added to the state highway system in early 1923. However, it was soon removed pending investigation of a conflicting contract for a turnpike company to build the road, but almost immediately reinstated, with the turnpike's right-of-way deed transferred to the state. In the 1928 renumbering, the road was renumbered as part of State Route 106 (which also continued south from Appalachia along SR 11 to Big Stone Gap and then to State Route 10 at Clinchport, replacing State Route 116), and it became State Route 67 in the 1933 renumbering. For a few years in the early 1930s, SR 106 carried U.S. Route 23 from Appalachia to Kentucky, but US 23 was soon realigned to its current route; the piece of SR 106 south of Big Stone Gap continued to carry US 23 and was thus eliminated in 1933. The final change came in the 1940 renumbering, when it was renumbered to State Route 160 to match Kentucky Route 160.

== Major intersections ==
The entire route is in Wise County.

Location	mi	km	Destinations	Notes
Black Mountain	0.00	0.00	KY 160 north	Kentucky state line; western terminus
Appalachia	8.02	12.91	SR 68 (Exeter Road) to US 23 Bus. – Keokee	Eastern terminus
1.000 mi = 1.609 km; 1.000 km = 0.621 mi

< SR 114	Spurs of SR 11; 1923–1928	SR 116 >
