= Dayhoit, Kentucky =

Unincorporated community in Kentucky, US

- Unincorporated community
- Location within Kentucky Location within the United States
- Coordinates: 36°50′23″N 83°22′37″W
- Country: United States
- State: Kentucky
- County: Harlan

Population (2000)
  - Total: 458
- Time zone: UTC-5 (Eastern (EST))
  - Summer (DST): UTC-4 (EDT)
- ZIP code: 40824

Dayhoit is an unincorporated community in Harlan County, Kentucky, United States. It has a post office with the ZIP code 40824. The population of the ZCTA for 40824 was 458 at the 2000 census.

Dayhoit is also known as Wilhoit, and its odd double name has a complicated history. A post office named for the Day family was here first, but Roy Wilhoit, a coal operator, insisted the railroad use his name for the new station. After an extended controversy, the Post Office Department decided in 1930 to compromise and call the office Dayhoit. The railroad continued to use Wilhoit, and the place appears on maps now as Wilhoit (Dayhoit PO).
