= Virginia State Route 68 =

State highway in Wise County, Virginia, US

State Route 68

Route information
- Maintained by VDOT
- Length: 6.13 mi (9.87 km)
- Existed: 1933–present
- Tourist routes: Virginia Byway

Major junctions
- West end: SR 606 near Keokee
- East end: US 23 Bus. in Appalachia

Location
- Country: United States
- State: Virginia
- Counties: Wise

Highway system
- Virginia Routes; Interstate; US; Primary; Secondary; Byways; History; HOT lanes
← SR 67	→ SR 69

State Route 68 (SR 68) is a primary state highway in the U.S. state of Virginia. Known for most of its length as Exeter Road, the state highway runs 6.13 miles (9.87 km) from the Lee–Wise county line near Keokee, where the highway continues west as SR 606, east to U.S. Route 23 Business (US 23 Business) in Appalachia.

== Route description ==
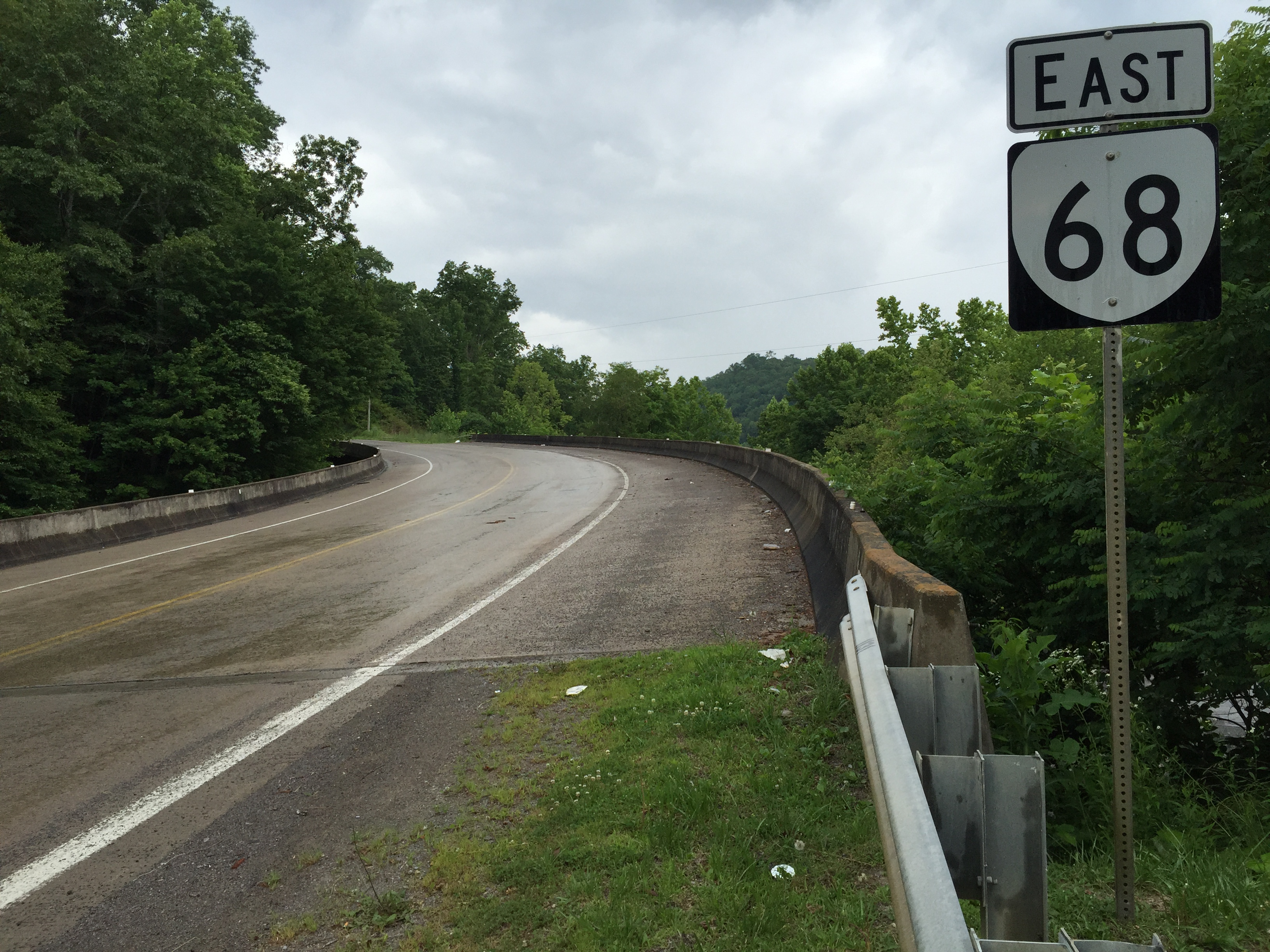
View east along SR 68 just west of Appalachia

SR 68 begins at the Lee County line, which is formed by the drainage divide between Craborchard Creek to the west and Pigeon Creek to the east. The roadway continues west into Lee County as SR 606 through Keokee toward Pennington Gap. SR 68, which is named Exeter Road, descends into the valley of Pigeon Creek and passes through the communities of Exeter, Lower Exeter, and Imboden. East of Lower Exeter, the state highway parallels a rail line that serves the coal mines in the valley. At Pigeon Creek's confluence with Looney Creek, where the streams enter the Powell River, SR 68 curves north across the rail line, crosses the rail line that parallels Looney Creek, and meets the eastern end of SR 160 (Inman Road). The state highway continues into the town of Appalachia as Inman Street, which crosses over Norfolk Southern Railway's Appalachia Division before reaching its eastern terminus at US 23 Business (Main Street).

== History ==
The whole length of SR 68, west from State Route 11 (now US 23 Business) near Appalachia to the county line, was added to the state highway system in 1928 as State Route 119. It was renumbered as SR 68 in 1933.

== Major intersections ==
The entire route is in Wise County.

Location	mi	km	Destinations	Notes
	0.00	0.00	SR 606 – Keokee	Lee–Wise county line; western terminus
Appalachia			SR 160 west (North Inman Street)	Eastern terminus of SR 160
Appalachia	6.13	9.87	US 23 Bus. (West Main Street) – Appalachia, Big Stone Gap	Eastern terminus
1.000 mi = 1.609 km; 1.000 km = 0.621 mi

< SR 118	District 1 State Routes; 1928–1933	SR 120 >
