= Elcomb, Kentucky =

Unincorporated community in Kentucky, United States

- Unincorporated community
- Location within Kentucky Location within the United States
- Coordinates: 36°49′16″N 83°19′58″W
- Country: United States
- State: Kentucky
- County: Harlan
- Elevation: 1,371 ft (418 m)
- Time zone: UTC-6 (Central (CST))
  - Summer (DST): UTC-5 (CST)
- GNIS feature ID: 491614

Elcomb is an unincorporated community and coal town in Harlan County, Kentucky, United States. The Elcomb Post Office was active from 1918 to 1935.
