= Hot Spot, Kentucky =

Unincorporated community in Kentucky, United States

- Unincorporated community
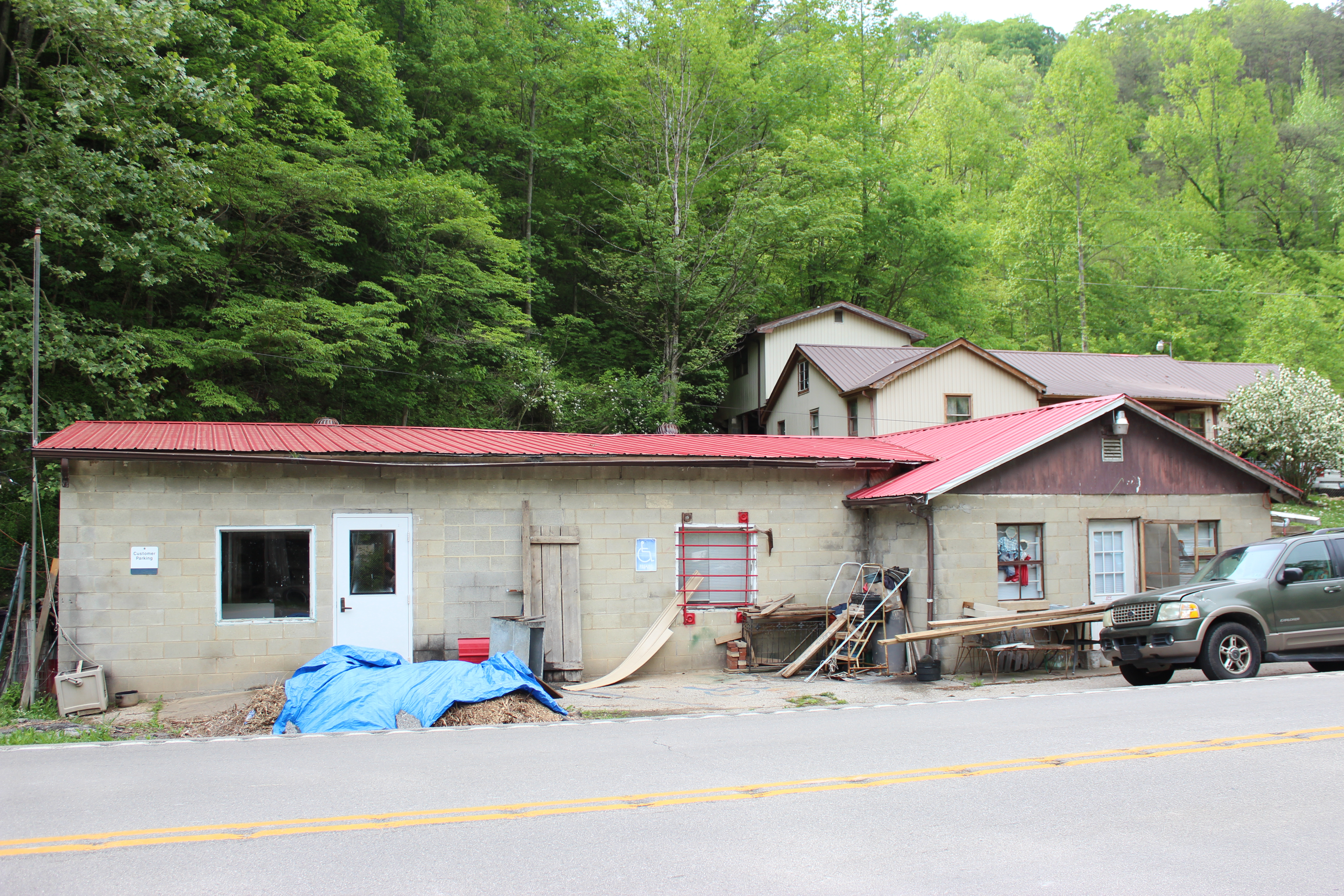
- Former post office

- Location in Kentucky Location in the United States
- Coordinates: 37°7′39″N 82°55′0″W
- Country: United States
- State: Kentucky
- County: Letcher
- Elevation: 1,066 ft (325 m)
- Time zone: UTC-5 (Eastern (EST))
  - Summer (DST): UTC-4 (EDT)
- ZIP code: 41845
- Area code: 606
- GNIS feature ID: 494624

Hot Spot is an unincorporated community and former coal town in Letcher County, Kentucky, United States. It was named for the Hot Spot Coal Company. Other names for the community have been Smoot Creek, Dalna, Elsiecoal, and Premium. It has frequently been noted on lists of unusual place names.

== Description ==
Hot Spot is located near Smoot Creek on Kentucky Route 160.

== History ==
The Smoot Creek post office serviced a community in Letcher County near Smoot Creek waterway from 1890 to 1914. The post office moved with coal camps, changing names to Dalna in 1918 and Elsiecoal in 1923. In 1932, Hot Spot was named for the Hot Spot Coal Company. It since has frequently been noted on lists of unusual place names. Its associated post office was renamed Premium in 1942. The Premium post office closed in 2022.
