= Teetersville, Kentucky =

Unincorporated community in Kentucky, United States

- Unincorporated community
- Location within Kentucky Location within the United States
- Coordinates: 36°48′47″N 83°20′10″W
- Country: United States
- State: Kentucky
- County: Harlan
- Elevation: 1,257 ft (383 m)
- Time zone: UTC-5 (Eastern (EST))
  - Summer (DST): UTC-4 (EDT)
- Postal code: 40831
- Area code: 606
- GNIS feature ID: 505056

Teetersville is an unincorporated community in Harlan County, Kentucky, United States.
