= Grays Knob, Kentucky =

Unincorporated community in Kentucky, United States

- Unincorporated community
- Location within Kentucky Location within the United States
- Coordinates: 36°48′24″N 83°18′36″W
- Country: United States
- State: Kentucky
- County: Harlan
- Elevation: 1,299 ft (396 m)
- Time zone: UTC-6 (Central (CST))
  - Summer (DST): UTC-5 (CST)
- ZIP codes: 40829
- GNIS feature ID: 493217

Grays Knob is an unincorporated community and coal town in Harlan County, Kentucky, United States.

A post office was established in the community in 1916, and named for a local hill. It is located just south of the city of Harlan.
