= Closplint, Kentucky =

Unincorporated community in Kentucky, United States

- Unincorporated community
- Location within Kentucky Location within the United States
- Coordinates: 36°54′14″N 83°4′10″W
- Country: United States
- State: Kentucky
- County: Harlan
- Elevation: 1,539 ft (469 m)
- Time zone: UTC-6 (Central (CST))
  - Summer (DST): UTC-5 (CST)
- ZIP codes: 40927
- GNIS feature ID: 511416

Closplint is an unincorporated community in Harlan County, Kentucky, United States. The settlement was named Cloversplint after the mining company (Clover Splint Coal Company, Inc. ) that built the mine to exploit the coal and the settlement as a coal town in 1926. The arrangement of the company houses is considered to have shown the influence of reform thinking about such towns. The company operated here between 1928 and 1946. When the United States Postal Service established a post office (ZIP Code 40927), it shortened the name to Closplint.
