= Chad, Kentucky =

Unincorporated community in Kentucky, United States

- Unincorporated community
- Location in Kentucky Location in the United States
- Coordinates: 36°58′11.33″N 83°1′21.59″W
- Country: United States
- State: Kentucky
- County: Harlan
- Elevation: 1,470 ft (448 m)
- Time zone: UTC-5 (Eastern (EST))
  - Summer (DST): UTC-4 (EDT)
- Area code: 606
- GNIS feature ID: 511306

Chad is an unincorporated community in Harlan County, Kentucky, United States. Chad is located on U.S. Route 119 and the Poor Fork about 2 miles (3.2 km) below the city of Cumberland, Kentucky. Chad had a post office from 1924 to 1932.
