= Putney, Kentucky =

Unincorporated community in Kentucky, United States

- Unincorporated community
- Location within Kentucky Location within the United States
- Coordinates: 36°54′19″N 83°13′35″W
- Country: United States
- State: Kentucky
- County: Harlan
- Elevation: 1,257 ft (383 m)
- Time zone: UTC-6 (Central (CST))
  - Summer (DST): UTC-5 (CST)
- ZIP code: 40865
- Area code: 606
- GNIS feature ID: 514804

Putney is an unincorporated community and coal town in Harlan County, Kentucky, United States. It is one of the trail heads for the Black Mountain Off-Road Adventure area. It's also the home to the Harlan Co. Campgrounds & Cabins, which offers several luxury cabins to rent, including a full-size replica of the Bate's Motel House.
