= Pansy, Kentucky =

Unincorporated community in Kentucky, United States

- Unincorporated community
- Location within Kentucky Location within the United States
- Coordinates: 36°46′30″N 83°19′44″W
- Country: United States
- State: Kentucky
- County: Harlan
- Elevation: 1,365 ft (416 m)
- Time zone: UTC-5 (Eastern (EST))
  - Summer (DST): UTC-4 (EDT)
- ZIP code: 40830
- Area code: 606
- GNIS feature ID: 500147

Pansy is an unincorporated community in Harlan County, Kentucky, United States. It was also known as Gulston, which had its own post office.
