= Blair, Kentucky =

Unincorporated community in Kentucky, United States

- Unincorporated community
- Location in Kentucky Location in the United States
- Coordinates: 36°59′25.33″N 82°57′10.58″W
- Country: United States
- State: Kentucky
- County: Harlan
- Elevation: 1,473 ft (449 m)
- Time zone: UTC-5 (Eastern (EST))
  - Summer (DST): UTC-4 (EST)
- Area code: 606
- GNIS feature ID: 487432

Blair is an unincorporated community in Harlan County, Kentucky, United States. The community is located about 2.5 miles (4.0 km) above the city of Cumberland, Kentucky. The Blair Post Office was established in 1941, with Rebecca Jane Lane, as its postmaster. The post office closed in 1972.
