= Totz, Kentucky =

Unincorporated community in Kentucky, United States

- Unincorporated community
- Location within Kentucky Location within the United States
- Coordinates: 36°56′41″N 83°7′4″W
- Country: United States
- State: Kentucky
- County: Harlan
- Elevation: 1,362 ft (415 m)
- Time zone: UTC-6 (Central (CST))
  - Summer (DST): UTC-5 (CST)
- ZIP codes: 40870
- GNIS feature ID: 515979

Totz is an unincorporated community in Harlan County, Kentucky, United States.
