= Hiram, Kentucky =

Unincorporated community in Kentucky, United States

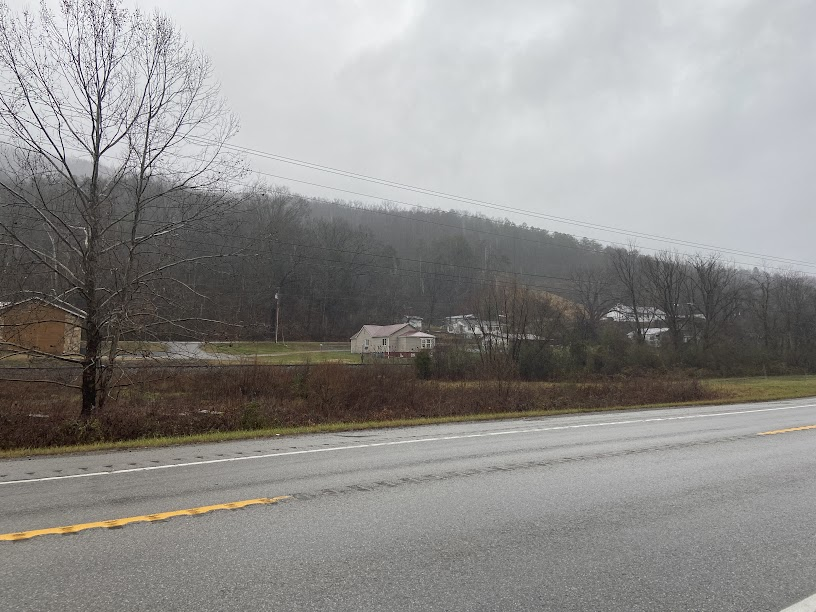
- Houses in Hiram taken from U.S. Route 119

- Location in Kentucky Location in the United States
- Coordinates: 36°57′59.33″N 83°2′49.59″W
- State: Kentucky
- County: Harlan
- Elevation: 1,394 ft (425 m)
- Time zone: UTC-5 (Eastern (EST))
  - Summer (DST): UTC-4 (EDT)
- Area code: 606
- GNIS feature ID: 512716

Hiram is an unincorporated community in Harlan County, Kentucky, United States. The community is located on U.S. Route 119 and the Poor Fork. The Hiram Post Office was established in 1943, with Frances E. Creech as its postmaster. It closed in 1965.
