= Carr Creek State Park =

State park in Kentucky, United States

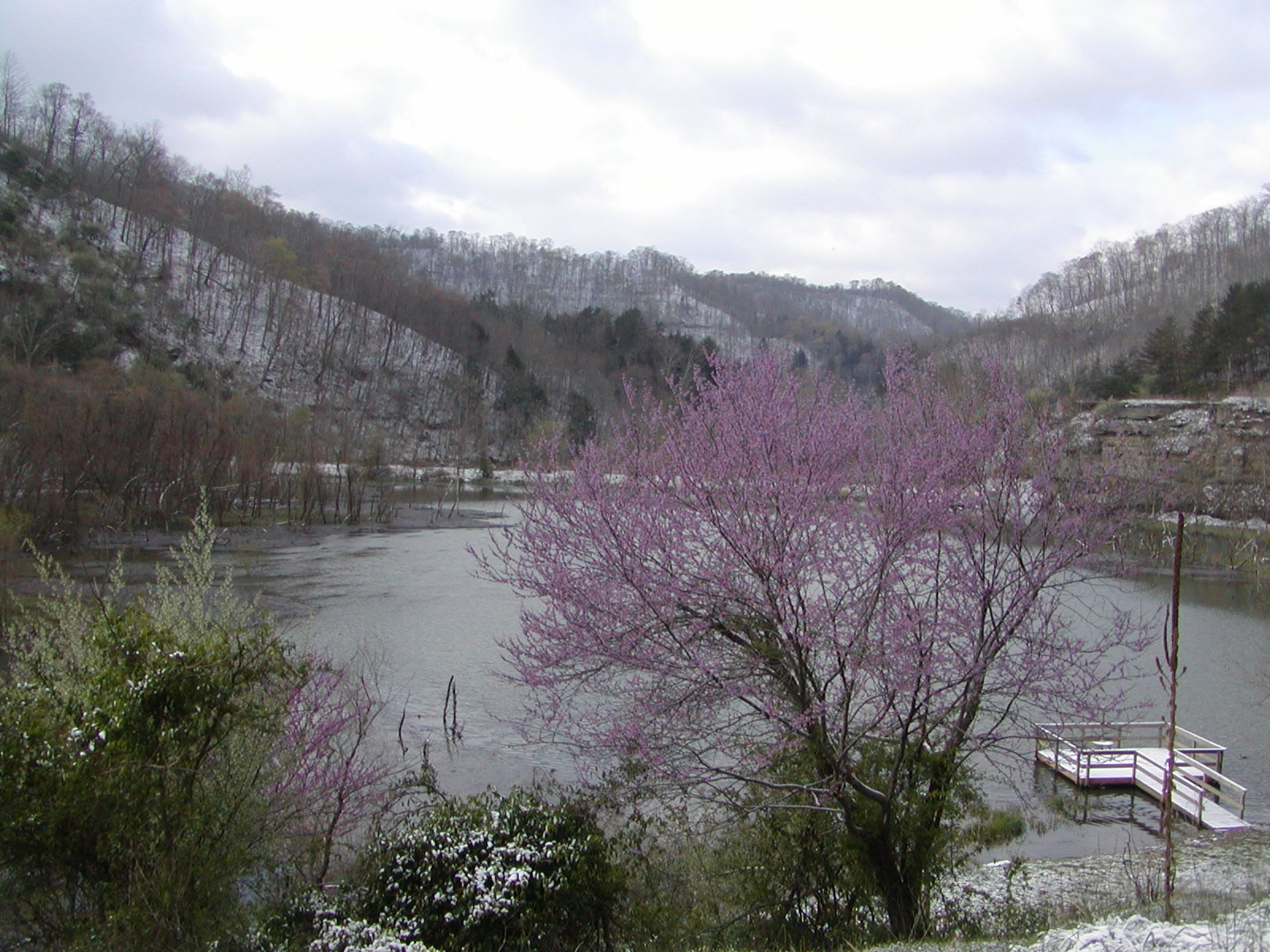

- Location within Kentucky Location within the United States
- Type: Kentucky state park
- Location: Knott County, Kentucky, United States
- Coordinates: 37°13′55″N 83°00′08″W
- Area: 29 acres (12 ha)
- Created: 1997
- Operator: Kentucky Department of Parks
- Open: Year-round
- Website: Official website

Carr Creek State Park is a park located along Kentucky Route 15 in Knott County, Kentucky, United States. The park itself encompasses 29 acres (12 ha), while the park's main feature, Carr Creek Lake, covers 750 acres (300 ha).

The park contains a 39-site campground, a full-service marina with snack bar, boat rental service, and a beach. The beach is 480 feet (150 m) long, making it the longest beach in the Kentucky park system.
