= Ice, Kentucky =

Unincorporated community in Kentucky, United States

- Unincorporated community
- Location in Kentucky Location in the United States
- Coordinates: 37°6′27″N 82°51′37″W
- Country: United States
- State: Kentucky
- County: Letcher
- Elevation: 1,138 ft (347 m)
- Time zone: UTC-5 (Eastern (EST))
  - Summer (DST): UTC-4 (EDT)
- GNIS feature ID: 508306

Ice is an unincorporated community in Letcher County, Kentucky, United States.

Ice owes its name to a complaint that someone made about the icy weather when the hamlet's post office was established on December 23, 1897. Ice's post office has since been discontinued.
