= Isom, Kentucky =

Unincorporated community in Kentucky, United States

Coordinates: 37°11′16″N 82°53′56″W

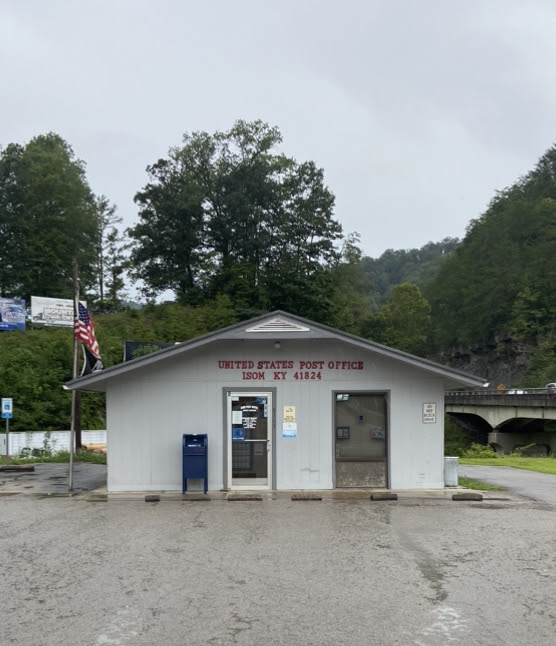
Isom post office located on Kentucky Route 15

Isom is a small unincorporated community in Letcher County, Kentucky, United States. It is located at the junction of KY 7, KY 15 and KY 1148 nine miles (14 km) northwest of Whitesburg. As of the 2020 United States census, the approximate population of the area in the Isom zip code was 769.

== History ==
Isom was named for Isom Sergent, a postmaster that lived in the community. It is located between Whitesburg and Hazard. Isom was very well known in the 1950s and early 1960s for the ever-popular Stock Sale. It was the central hub on weekends for buying, trading or selling livestock, produce, and many other goods. Families out for a Sunday drive would usually go by the Stock Sale.

== Isom Days ==
The first weekend of September each year, Isom hosts the Isom Days Festival. The festival includes food booths, vendors, and craft booths, as well as various amounts of carnival games and rides.
