= Black Mountain (Kentucky) =

Mountain in Kentucky, United States

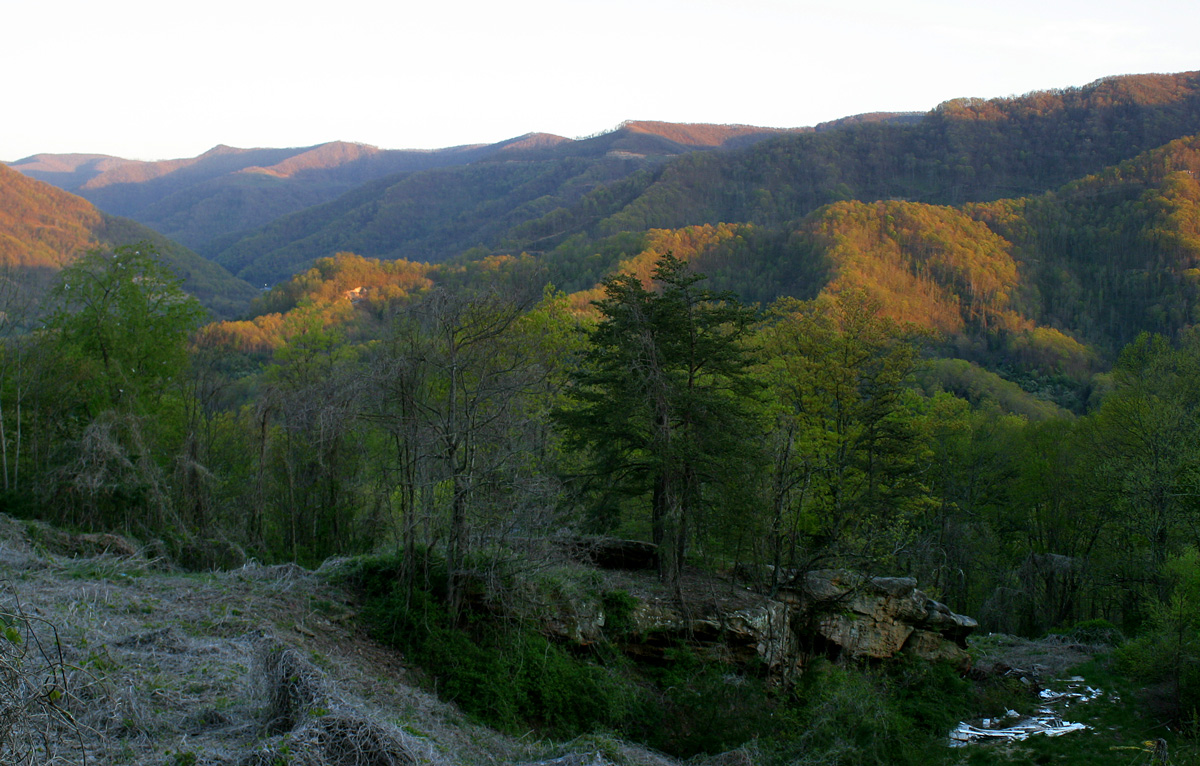
- Black Mountain, April 2010

Highest point
- Elevation: 4,145 ft (1,263 m)
- Prominence: 1,905 ft (581 m)
- Listing: U.S. state high point 27th
- Coordinates: 36°54′51″N 82°53′38″W

Geography
- Location within Kentucky
- Location: Harlan County, Kentucky, U.S.
- Parent range: Cumberland Mountains
- Topo map: USGS Benham

Climbing
- First ascent: unknown
- Easiest route: Hike

Black Mountain is the highest mountain peak in the Commonwealth of Kentucky, United States, with a summit elevation of 4,145 feet (1,263 m) above mean sea level and a top-to-bottom height of over 2,500 feet (760 m). The summit is located at approximately 36°54′51″N 82°53′38″W in Harlan County, Kentucky near the Virginia border, just above the towns of Lynch, Kentucky and Appalachia, Virginia.

== Description ==
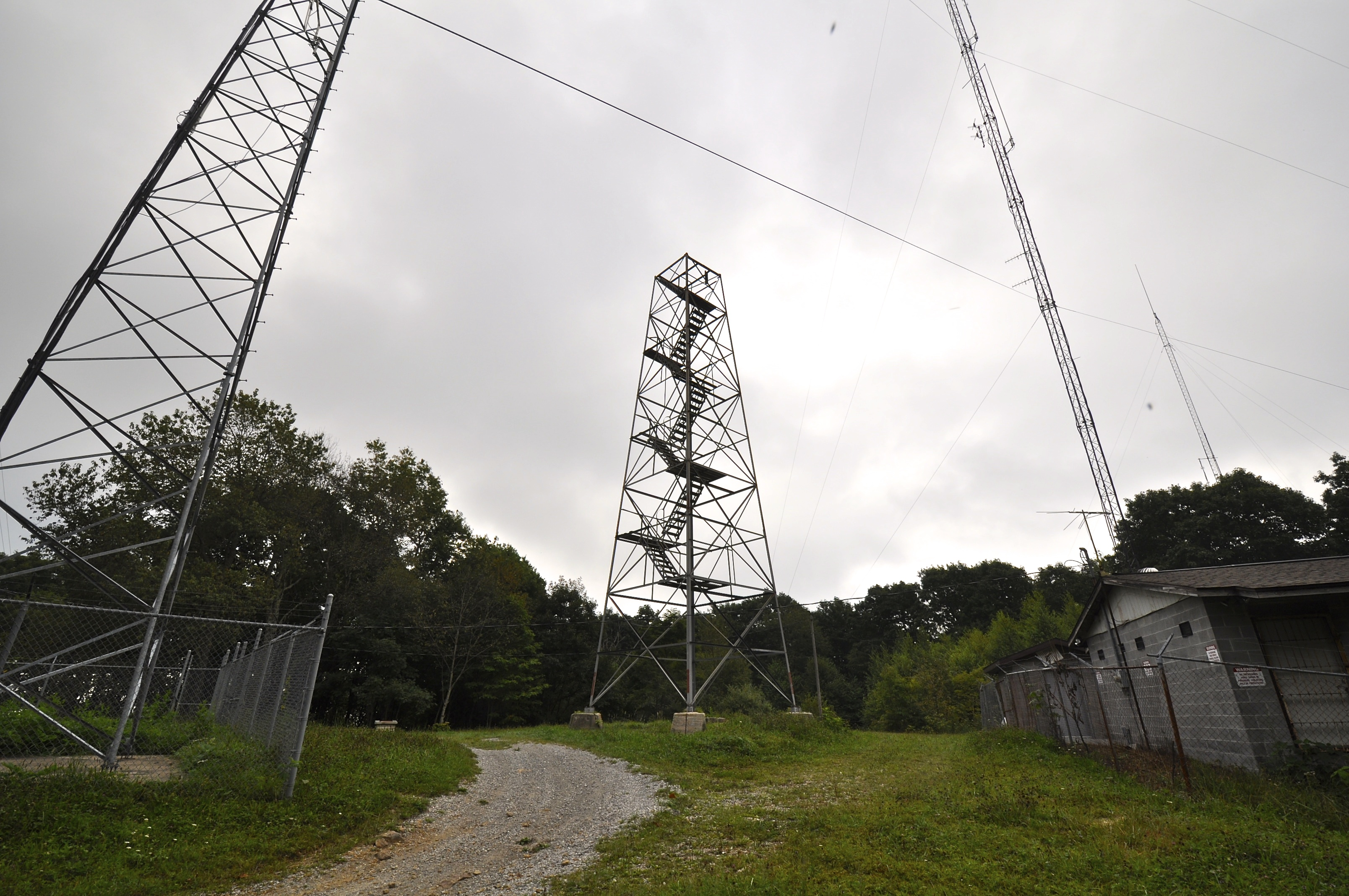
The summit of Black Mountain, August 2013

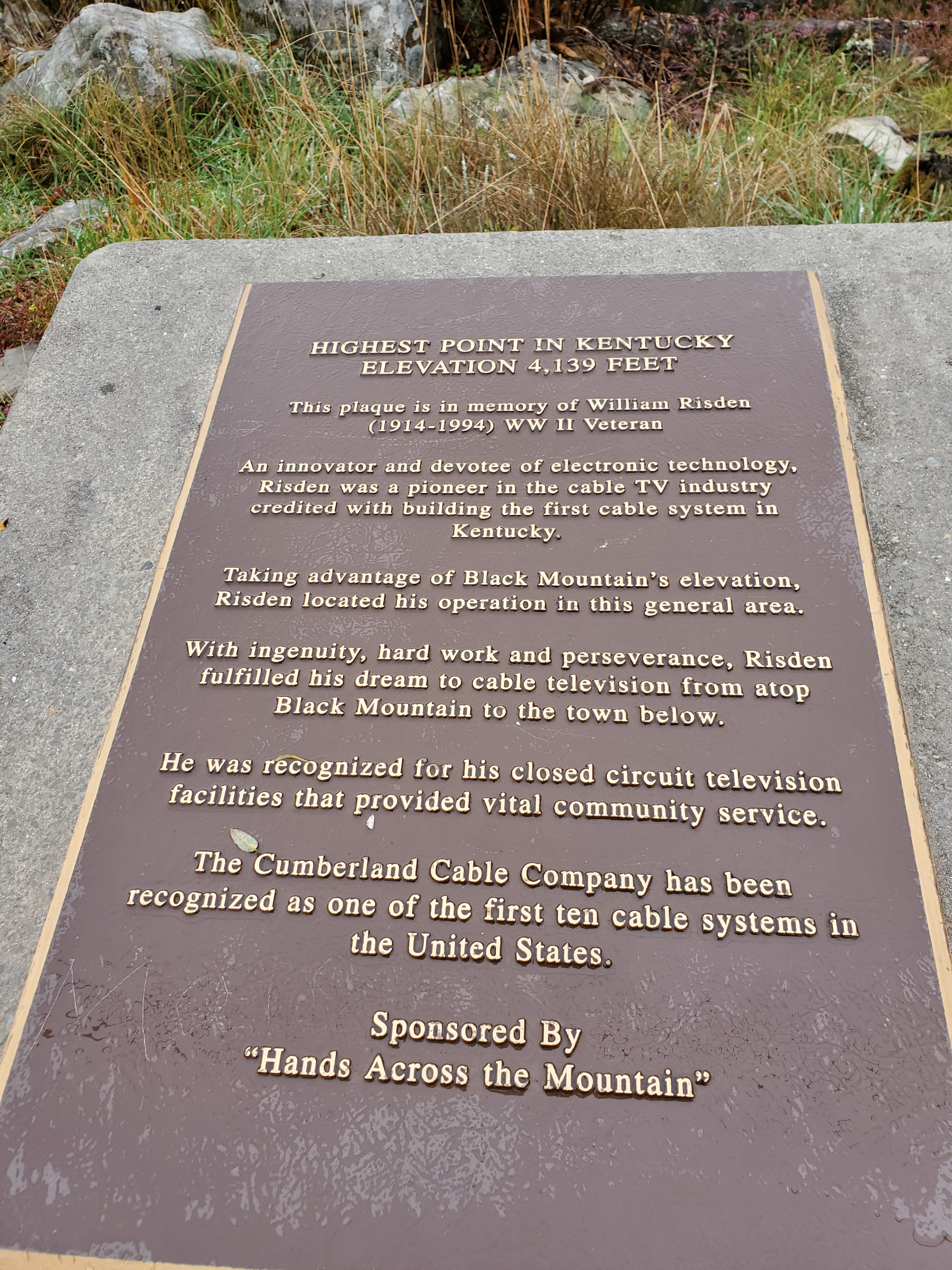
Black Mountain summit plaque

Route 160 east of Lynch and west of Appalachia crosses the mountain. The summit is reached by a narrow road that turns off to the right if coming from Lynch or to the left if coming from Appalachia, at the Kentucky-Virginia line (the gap that is the highest part of Route 160) and leads past a Federal Aviation Administration radar dome. There is a one lane dirt road to the left not far past the radar dome that leads to the summit. The summit is marked with an abandoned metal fire lookout tower (the cab and wooden steps are missing from the tower). There are also multiple radio towers along with transmitter buildings around the summit and a National Geodetic Survey benchmark is located on a large rock over the hill to the left of the fire tower. This benchmark is 6 feet (1.8 m) below the highest point; a second is directly under the old lookout tower, marking the latest survey of the highest natural point.

The FAA Radar dome is nearby, but below the summit. Trees on both sides of the radar dome have been cleared, so views of other mountains are visible. On a clear day the Great Smoky Mountains on the Tennessee and North Carolina border are clearly visible.

Black Mountain's history is intimately tied to the coal mining of the surrounding region. Lynch, Kentucky, was once one of the largest coal mining towns in the nation. In 1998, Jericol Mining, Inc., petitioned to use mountaintop removal methods in the area of Black Mountain. Though the summit itself was not directly threatened, many people protested this action due to the peak's status as the state's highest point. In 1999, Kentucky purchased mineral and timber rights to the summit and prevented future large scale mining. Coal companies have alleged that mined coal veins converge beneath the summit of Black Mountain and that the summit is prone to collapse.

A coal company named Penn Virginia Resources of Radnor, Pennsylvania formerly owned the summit, but allowed public access with the completion of a waiver. Now, however, the Commonwealth of Kentucky owns the land and no waiver is required.

== Ecology ==
Black Mountain is one of the few sites in Kentucky supporting a Northern Hardwood Forest at higher elevations. Numerous rare plants are found here, including Red Elderberry and Hobblebush. Like many areas of Northern Hardwood Forest in Southern Appalachia, fires swept across the mountain after intense logging. Black Mountain has a documented fire that occurred in the fall of 1896.

== See also ==
- List of mountains of Kentucky
- List of U.S. states by elevation
