= Clutts, Kentucky =

Unincorporated community in Kentucky, United States

- Unincorporated community
- Location within Kentucky Location within the United States
- Coordinates: 36°58′19″N 82°58′14″W
- Country: United States
- State: Kentucky
- County: Harlan
- Elevation: 1,516 ft (462 m)
- Time zone: UTC-6 (Central (CST))
  - Summer (DST): UTC-5 (CST)
- GNIS feature ID: 489715

Clutts is a coal town and an unincorporated community in Harlan County, Kentucky, United States.

The coal it produced was distributed through the Clutts railroad station that gave the community its original name. It has also been referred to as Pee Vee.
