= Carr Creek Lake =

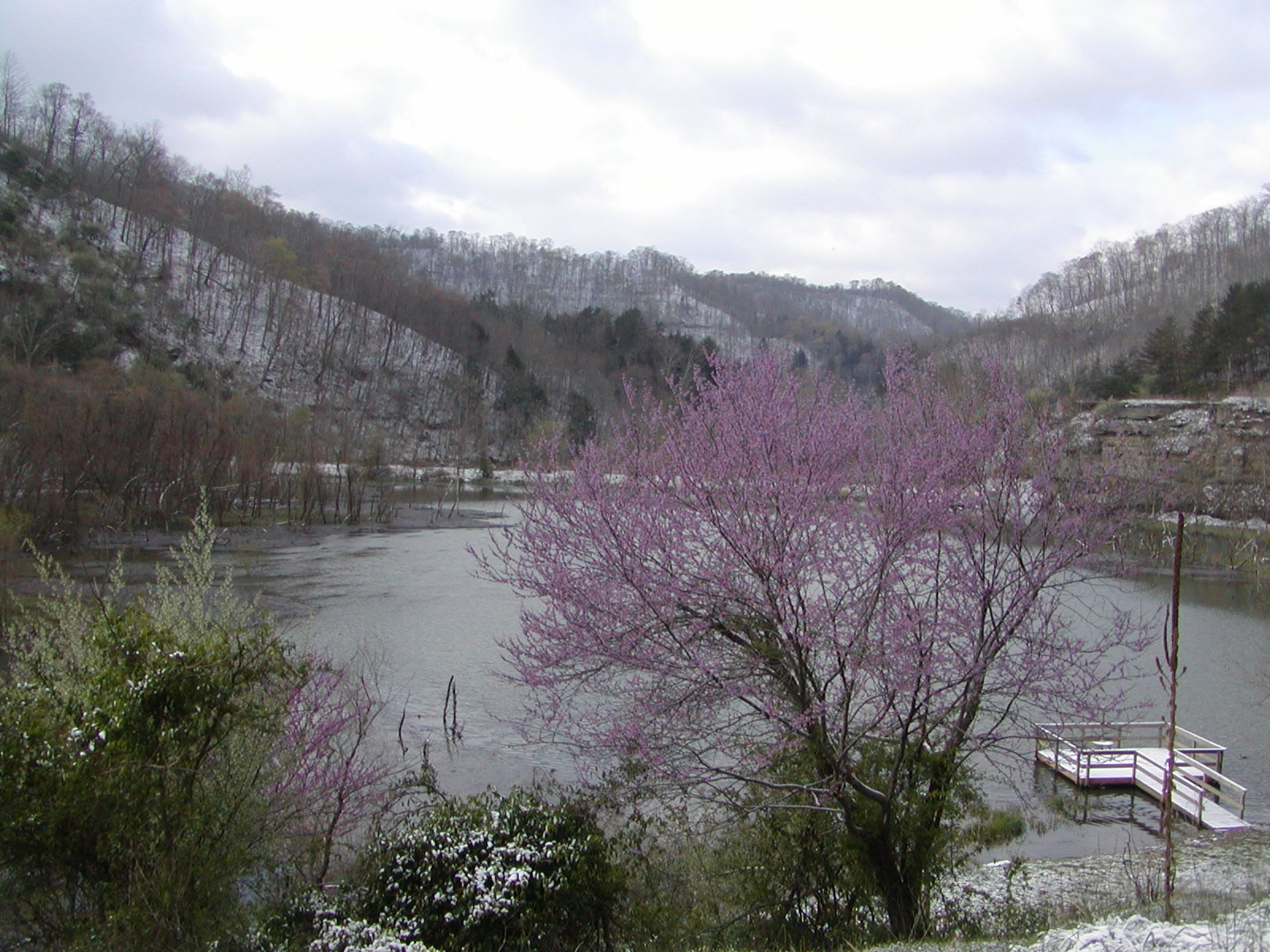

- Location within Kentucky Location within the United States
- Location: Knott County, Kentucky
- Coordinates: 37°14′06″N 83°00′11″W
- Type: reservoir
- Basin countries: United States
- Surface area: 710 acres (3 km^{2})
- Surface elevation: 1,020 ft (310 m)

Carr Creek Lake (formerly Carr Fork Lake), located east of Hazard, Kentucky, along Kentucky Route 15 in Knott County, is a 710 acres (3 km^{2}) reservoir created by the U.S. Army Corps of Engineers in 1976. Carr Creek Lake's earth and rock fill dam is 130 ft (40 m) tall and 720 ft (219 m) long, and the dam is located 8.8 mi (14 km) above the mouth of Carr Fork River, a tributary of the North Fork Kentucky River.

The lake is the main attraction of Carr Creek State Park. The emergency spillway of the dam exposes many layers of the underlying rock, showing the geological history of the area back to the Pennsylvanian Period.

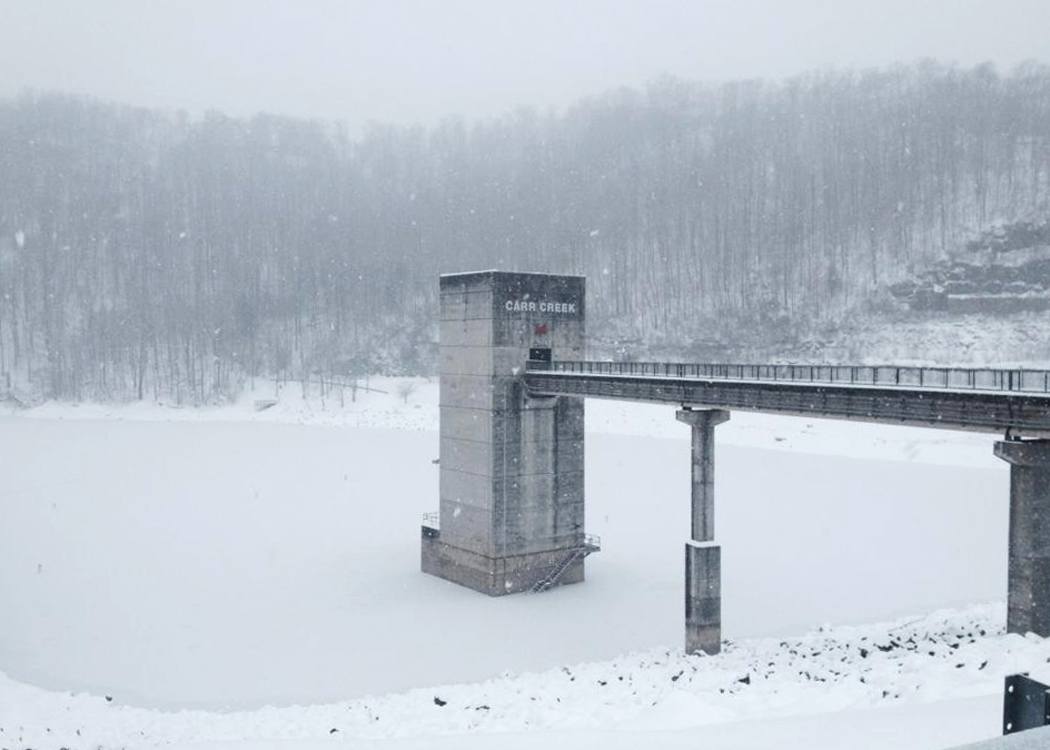
Control tower at Carr Creek Dam
