= Harlan County, Kentucky =

County in the United States

- County
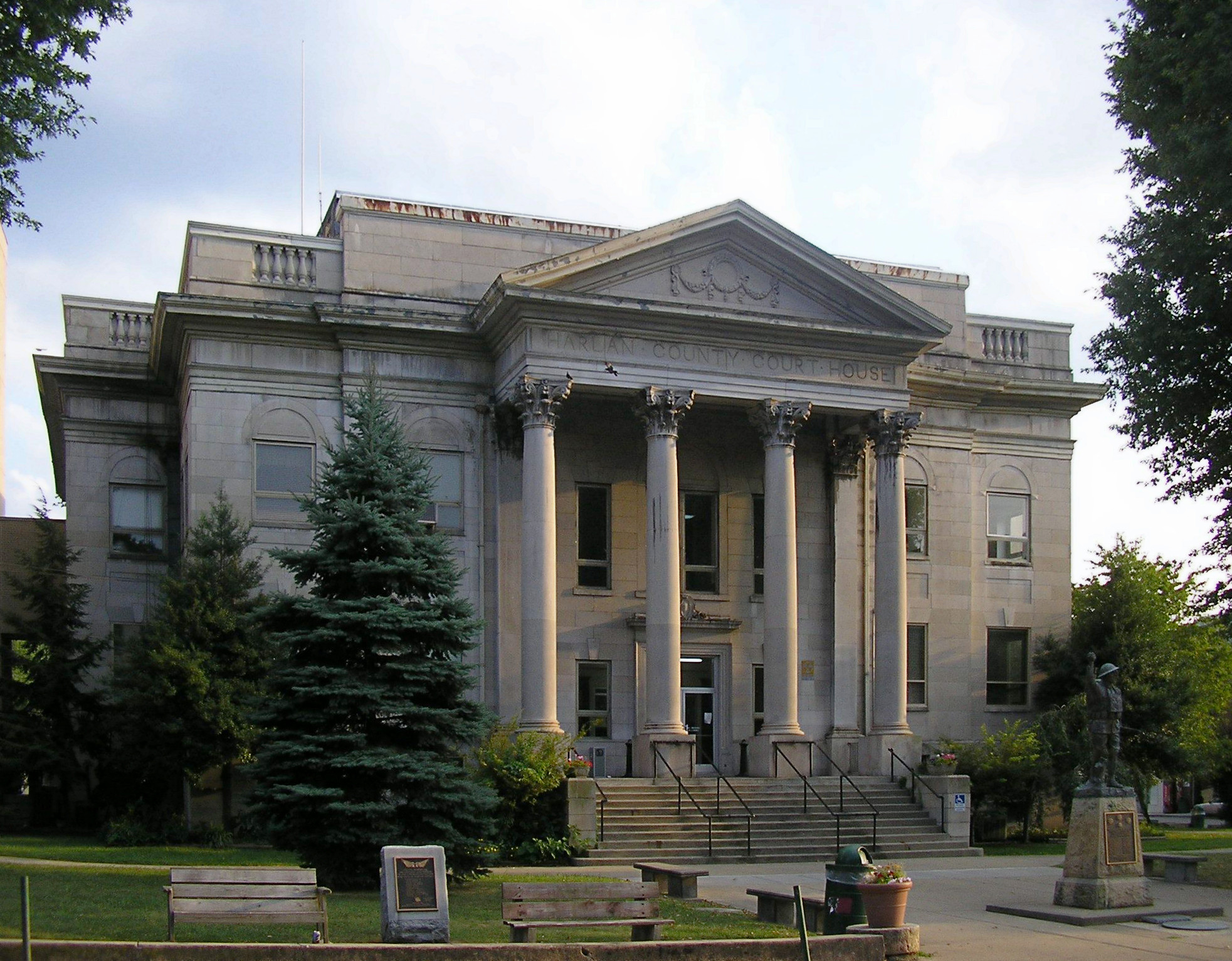
- Harlan County courthouse in Harlan

- Seal

- Location within the U.S. state of Kentucky
- Coordinates: 36°52′N 83°13′W
- Country: United States
- State: Kentucky
- Founded: 1819
- Named for: Silas Harlan
- Seat: Harlan
- Largest city: Cumberland

Government
  - Judge/Executive: Dan Mosley (R)

Area
  - Total: 468 sq mi (1,210 km^{2})
  - Land: 466 sq mi (1,210 km^{2})
  - Water: 2.3 sq mi (6.0 km^{2}) 0.5%

Population (2020)
  - Total: 26,831
  - Estimate (2025): 24,725 ▼
  - Density: 57.6/sq mi (22.2/km^{2})
- Time zone: UTC−5 (Eastern)
  - Summer (DST): UTC−4 (EDT)
- Congressional district: 5th
- Website: judge-executive.harlanonline.net

Harlan County is located in southeastern Kentucky. As of the 2020 census, the population was 26,831. The county seat is Harlan. Kentucky's highest natural point, Black Mountain (4,145 feet (1,263 m)), is in Harlan County.

During the Great Depression it was a center of labor strife between coal mine owners and unionized workers, notably in the Harlan County War of the 1930s. After the respite provided by WWII's need for coal to drive war production, the industry declined in the 1950s. The loss of jobs resulted in a steadily declining population and depressed economy. Harlan County has a high prevalence of poverty, lower longevity, and low family income.

Harlan is generally a dry county but because Cumberland is "wet" (package alcohol sales are allowed) and Harlan city permits restaurants seating 100+ to serve alcohol it is considered a moist county.

== History ==
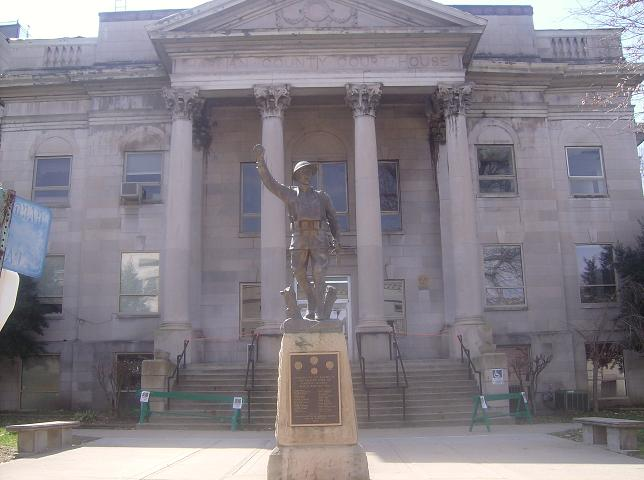
Harlan County Courthouse

Eastern Kentucky is believed to have supported a large Archaic Native American population in prehistoric time. Cliff dwellings were used by successive cultures as residences and at times for burials. In 1923, an Indian Cliff Dwelling was discovered near Bledsoe, Kentucky Historical tribes in this area included the Cherokee and Shawnee.

Before the American Revolutionary War, the area presently bounded by state lines was considered to be part of the Virginia colony. In 1780, the Virginia state legislature divided Kentucky County into three counties: Fayette, Jefferson, and Lincoln. In 1791 - as part of the state of Kentucky - these were incorporated into the new nation. In 1799, part of Lincoln County was divided to create Knox County. Harlan County was formed in 1819 from a part of Knox County and named after Silas Harlan who built a log stockade near Danville, which was known as "Harlan's Station". His grand-nephew was U.S. Supreme Court Justice John Marshall Harlan .

Due to increasing population, in 1842 part of the county split off to become Letcher County in 1842; Bell County was likewise established in 1867. In 1878, the northwestern area was partitioned to form part of Leslie County.

In 1924, Conda Uless (Ulysses) "Condy" Dabney was convicted in the county of murdering a person who was later found alive.

My daddy was a miner
And I'm a miner's son
And I'll stick with the union
Till every battle's won

They say in Harlan County
There are no neutrals there
You'll either be a union man
Or a thug for J.H. Blair

— Florence Patton Reece,
Which Side Are You On?

Coal mining was the only major resource in the county and was exploited to fuel the growth of early 20th century industry. When the Great Depression struck in 1930 and demand for coal reduced, often-violent confrontations between strikers, strikebreakers, mine company security forces, and law enforcement were termed the Harlan County Wars. After the Battle of Evarts, May 5, 1931, Kentucky governor Flem D. Sampson called in the National Guard to restore order.

Ballads sung on the picket line at the Brookside mine in Harlan County were captured on film by documentarian John Gaventa. The county was the subject of the documentary film Harlan County, USA (1976), directed by Barbara Kopple. It documented organizing during a second major period of labor unrest in the 1970s, particularly around the Brookside Strike.

In 2019, the county was the site of the 2019 Harlan County coal miners protest, one in a long history of coal mining. Coal miners demanded back payment from a coal company that fired them shortly after declaring bankruptcy. They occupied a railroad track and prevented a coal train from leaving the county for almost two months.

== Geography ==
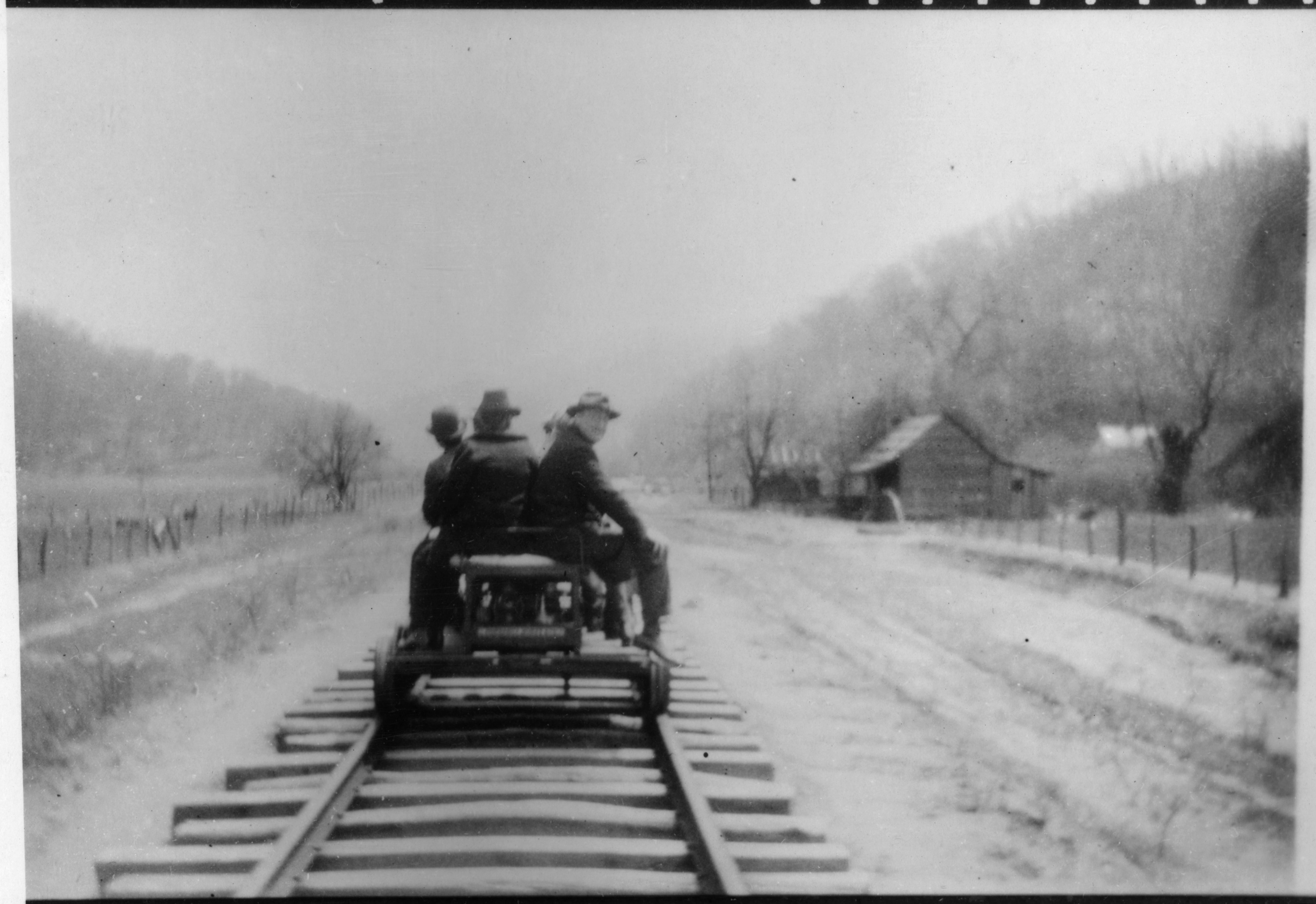
Franklin D. Roosevelt in Harlan County, 1908

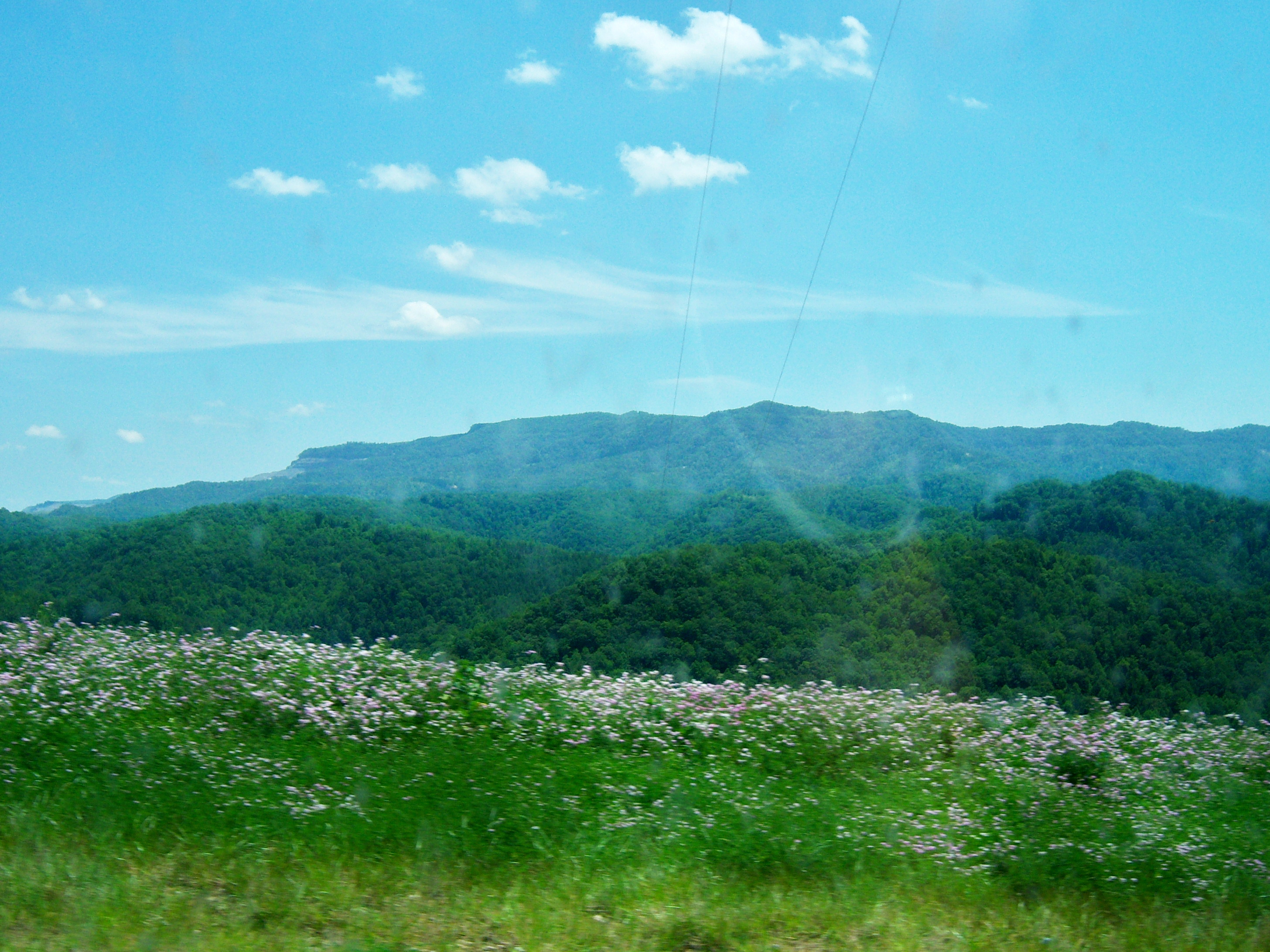
Black Mountain

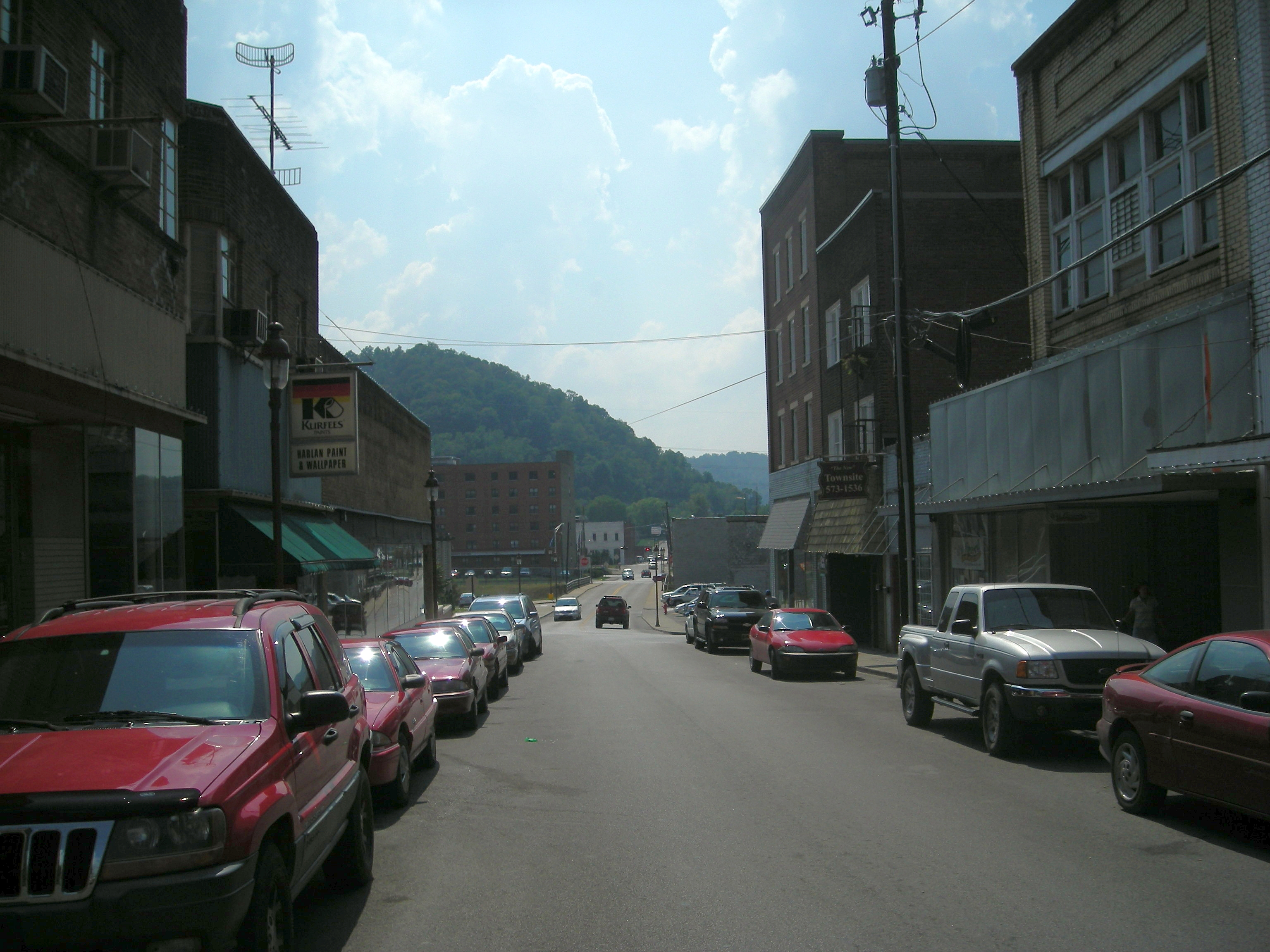
Main Street in Harlan

According to the United States Census Bureau, the county has a total area of 468 square miles (1,210 km^{2}), of which 466 square miles (1,210 km^{2}) is land and 2.3 square miles (6.0 km^{2}) (0.5%) is water.

=== Features ===
The headwaters of the Cumberland River are located in Harlan County: Poor Fork (extending from the city of Harlan east past the city of Cumberland and into Letcher County), Clover Fork extending East from above Evarts, and Martins Fork (extending through the city of Harlan west). The confluence is located in Baxter.

Black Mountain, located east of Lynch, is Kentucky's highest point, with an elevation of 4,145 feet (1,263 m) above sea level.

=== Major highways ===
- U.S. Highway 421
- U.S. Highway 119
- Kentucky Route 38
- Kentucky Route 160

=== Adjacent counties ===
- Perry County (north)
- Letcher County (northeast)
- Wise County, Virginia (east)
- Lee County, Virginia (southeast)
- Bell County (southwest)
- Leslie County (northwest)

=== National protected areas ===
- Cumberland Gap National Historical Park (part)
- Blanton Forest

== Demographics ==
Historical population
Census	Pop.	Note	%±
1820	1,961		—
1830	2,929		49.4%
1840	3,015		2.9%
1850	4,268		41.6%
1860	5,494		28.7%
1870	4,415		−19.6%
1880	5,278		19.5%
1890	6,197		17.4%
1900	9,838		58.8%
1910	10,566		7.4%
1920	31,546		198.6%
1930	64,557		104.6%
1940	75,275		16.6%
1950	71,751		−4.7%
1960	51,107		−28.8%
1970	37,370		−26.9%
1980	41,889		12.1%
1990	36,574		−12.7%
2000	33,202		−9.2%
2010	29,278		−11.8%
2020	26,831		−8.4%
2025 (est.)	24,725	▼	−7.8%
U.S. Decennial Census; 1790–1960 1900–1990; 1990–2000 2010–2020

=== 2020 census ===
As of the 2020 census, the county had a population of 26,831. The median age was 42.3 years. 22.1% of residents were under the age of 18 and 19.1% of residents were 65 years of age or older. For every 100 females there were 93.3 males, and for every 100 females age 18 and over there were 90.9 males age 18 and over.

The racial makeup of the county was 93.6% White, 2.0% Black or African American, 0.2% American Indian and Alaska Native, 0.3% Asian, 0.0% Native Hawaiian and Pacific Islander, 0.4% from some other race, and 3.5% from two or more races. Hispanic or Latino residents of any race comprised 1.0% of the population.

22.9% of residents lived in urban areas, while 77.1% lived in rural areas.

There were 11,249 households in the county, of which 28.6% had children under the age of 18 living with them and 31.0% had a female householder with no spouse or partner present. About 32.6% of all households were made up of individuals and 13.7% had someone living alone who was 65 years of age or older.

There were 12,962 housing units, of which 13.2% were vacant. Among occupied housing units, 67.4% were owner-occupied and 32.6% were renter-occupied. The homeowner vacancy rate was 1.6% and the rental vacancy rate was 8.7%.

=== 2000 census ===
As of the census of 2000, there were 33,202 people, 13,291 households, and 9,449 families residing in the county. The population density was 71 per square mile (27/km^{2}). There were 15,017 housing units at an average density of 32 per square mile (12/km^{2}). The racial makeup of the county was 95.56% White, 2.62% African American, 0.48% Native American, 0.29% Asian, 0.02% Pacific Islander, 0.08% from other races, and 0.95% from two or more races. 0.65% of the population were Hispanics or Latinos of any race.

There were 13,291 households, out of which 32.20% had children under the age of 18 living with them, 54.30% were married couples living together, 13.20% had a female householder with no husband present, and 28.90% were non-families. 27.00% of all households were made up of individuals, and 12.60% had someone living alone who was 65 years of age or older. The average household size was 2.47 and the average family size was 3.00.

The age distribution was 25.00% under the age of 18, 8.50% from 18 to 24, 27.50% from 25 to 44, 25.20% from 45 to 64, and 13.90% who were 65 years of age or older. The median age was 38 years. For every 100 females, there were 91.80 males. For every 100 females age 18 and over, there were 87.80 males.

The median income for a household in the county was $18,665, and the median income for a family was $23,536. Males had a median income of $29,148 versus $19,288 for females. The per capita income for the county was $11,585. About 29.10% of families and 32.50% of the population were below the poverty line, including 40.10% of those under age 18 and 21.00% of those aged 65 or over.

== Life expectancy ==
Of 3,142 counties in the United States in 2013, Harlan County ranked 3,139 in the longevity of both male and female residents. Males in Harlan County lived an average of 66.5 years and females lived an average of 73.1 years compared to the national average for the longevity of 76.5 for males and 81.2 for females. Moreover, the average longevity in Harlan County declined by 0.6 years for males and 2.6 years for females between 1985 and 2013 compared to a national average for the same period of an increased life span of 5.5 years for men and 3.1 years for women.

== Economy ==
For 100 years, the economy of Harlan County and other counties in eastern Kentucky was based on coal mining. The latter-twentieth-century decline of coal production and employment has led to widespread poverty and high unemployment.

Although coal mining began much earlier, the first shipment of coal by railroad from Harlan County occurred in 1911 and coal production boomed thereafter. Mining employment in Harlan County rose to 13,619 in 1950. The number of employed miners had declined to 764 by June 2016. During the same period, the population of Harlan County declined from 71,000 to less than 28,000. Unemployment has been as high as 20 percent (September 1995) and has consistently been higher than the U.S. national average. Unemployment in December 2016 was 9.5 percent, compared to 4.8 percent in the nation as a whole. Harlan County ranked in the highest 10 percent of all United States counties in the prevalence of poverty among its residents.

Annual per capita personal income in Harlan County was $27,425 in 2014 compared to a national average of $48,112.

By 2016, more than half of the county's income came from transfers from the Federal government such as Social Security, Medicare and food stamps.

As of 2018 new jobs are being located in the county as Teleworks USA has opened a hub in the city of Harlan. This has provided over 200 new jobs as of April 2018 SEKRI, located in the Blair community near the city of Cumberland, also announced expansions and added an additional 100 jobs in March 2018.

== Politics ==
United States presidential election results for Harlan County, Kentucky
Year	Republican		Democratic		Third party(ies)	
Year	No.	%	No.	%	No.	%
1912	612	34.23%	345	19.30%	831	46.48%
1916	2,670	77.73%	690	20.09%	75	2.18%
1920	7,493	80.13%	1,805	19.30%	53	0.57%
1924	9,634	72.94%	2,133	16.15%	1,441	10.91%
1928	12,251	75.41%	3,958	24.36%	37	0.23%
1932	11,118	54.89%	9,091	44.88%	45	0.22%
1936	7,510	40.44%	11,060	59.56%	0	0.00%
1940	5,859	35.55%	10,582	64.20%	42	0.25%
1944	5,815	42.02%	8,000	57.81%	23	0.17%
1948	4,402	31.76%	9,158	66.08%	300	2.16%
1952	10,025	57.85%	7,284	42.03%	21	0.12%
1956	8,820	55.96%	6,915	43.87%	26	0.16%
1960	7,485	44.83%	9,211	55.17%	0	0.00%
1964	4,025	29.97%	9,394	69.96%	9	0.07%
1968	4,572	34.96%	6,389	48.86%	2,116	16.18%
1972	6,527	59.42%	4,349	39.59%	109	0.99%
1976	4,624	38.51%	7,300	60.80%	82	0.68%
1980	5,460	37.77%	8,798	60.86%	199	1.38%
1984	6,959	47.14%	7,663	51.91%	140	0.95%
1988	5,166	41.08%	7,341	58.37%	69	0.55%
1992	3,970	32.53%	6,796	55.69%	1,437	11.78%
1996	3,337	32.95%	5,874	58.00%	916	9.05%
2000	4,980	47.27%	5,365	50.93%	190	1.80%
2004	6,659	60.15%	4,332	39.13%	79	0.71%
2008	7,165	72.27%	2,586	26.08%	163	1.64%
2012	8,652	81.19%	1,830	17.17%	175	1.64%
2016	9,129	84.87%	1,372	12.75%	256	2.38%
2020	9,367	85.38%	1,494	13.62%	110	1.00%
2024	9,109	87.69%	1,199	11.54%	80	0.77%

Harlan County's political history resembles West Virginia's. Under the Third and Fourth Party systems it was a Republican county: except when supporting Theodore Roosevelt's "Bull Moose" Party in 1912, it voted Republican for the presidential candidate in every election from 1880 to 1932. However, with increasing unionization in the coal industry, it became a Democratic stronghold for six decades. With the exception of Dwight D. Eisenhower's victories in 1952 and 1956, and Richard Nixon's landslide re-election in 1972 (in which it gave 59.4% of its votes to the Republican incumbent Nixon and 39.6% of its votes to Democratic presidential nominee George McGovern), it voted blue in every election from 1936 to 2000.

Even in Ronald Reagan's landslide re-election of 1984, Harlan County voted 51.9% for Democratic presidential nominee Walter Mondale, while incumbent Reagan received 47.1% of the vote. But the decline of the coal industry also changed politics in the county: in the 2004 Presidential election, Harlan County voted for the Republican presidential nominee for the first time in 32 years; Republican incumbent George W. Bush received 60.2% of the vote, while the Democratic presidential nominee John Kerry received 39.1% of the vote.

This rightward trend continued in 2008, when Republican presidential candidate John McCain received 72.3% of the vote, while Democratic presidential nominee Barack Obama received 26.1% of the vote. In 2012, the Republican gap was even larger, as the Republican presidential nominee Mitt Romney won the county over the Democratic incumbent Obama by a 64% margin (81.2% to 17.2%). In the 2016 election, its voters supported Republican nominee Donald Trump over Democrat Hillary Clinton by a 72.12% margin (84.87 to 12.75).

In 2020 Donald Trump received 85.38% of the county's vote compared to 13.62% for Democratic nominee Joe Biden, for a slightly lower margin of 71.76%. but an improvement over his previous percentage of 84.87%.

=== Elected officials ===
Elected officials as of January 3, 2025
U.S. House	Hal Rogers (R)	KY 5
Ky. Senate	Scott Madon (R)	29
Ky. House	Adam Bowling (R)	87
Ky. House	Mitch Whitaker (R)	94

== Education ==
=== Higher education ===
The county's only higher education institution is Southeast Kentucky Community and Technical College (formerly known as Southeast Community College), a part of the Kentucky Community and Technical College System, with its main campus in Cumberland.

=== K–12 Harlan County public schools ===
The county has two K–12 public school districts. Harlan County Public Schools covers all of Harlan County, except for the city of Harlan and some small unincorporated communities adjacent to the city. The district operates one high school, Harlan County High School, which opened in August 2008. The school nickname is Black Bears, reflecting the area's increasing black bear population. The new high school, located in the rural community of Rosspoint east of Harlan, replaced three other high schools:

- Cumberland High School, Cumberland, served students from the cities of Cumberland, Benham, Lynch, and near the Letcher County border.
- Evarts High School, Evarts, served the area from the Harlan City limits to the Virginia border.
- James A. Cawood High School, Harlan, served students in central Harlan County.

The district operates the following K–8 schools:

- Black Mountain Elementary
- Cawood Elementary
- Cumberland Elementary
- Evarts Elementary
- Green Hills Elementary
- James A. Cawood Elementary
- Rosspoint Elementary
- Wallins Elementary

==== Harlan Independent Schools ====
Harlan Independent Schools is a separate district covering the city of Harlan and operating the following schools:

- Harlan High School
- Harlan Middle School
- Harlan Elementary School

=== K–12 private schools ===
- Harlan County Christian School (Putney)

== Economy ==
=== Coal companies in Harlan County ===
- Alpha Natural Resources
- Harlan-Cumberland Coal Company
- JRL Coal Company
- Sequoa Energy
- James River Coal Company
- US Coal

== Area attractions ==
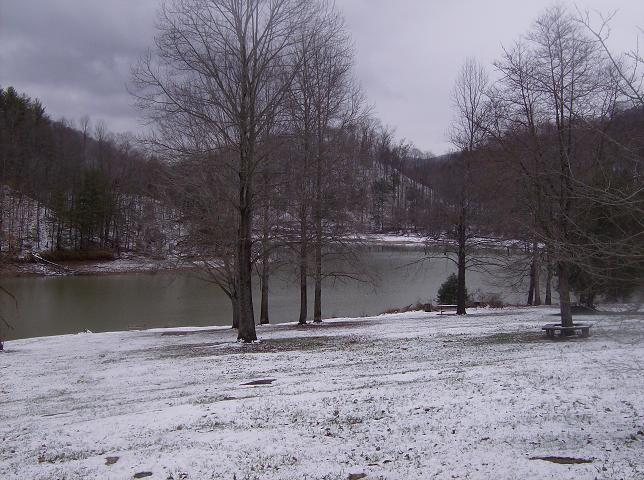
Martins Fork Lake

- Black Mountain Off-Road Adventure Area: This off-road park has been voted number one all-terrain vehicle (ATV) destination by ATV Pathfinder for two years running. It consists of more than 7,000 acres (28 km^{2}) set aside for quads and 4WD vehicle recreation. Harlan County also holds the Guinness World Record for the largest ATV parade.
- Cranks Creek Lake
- Kentucky Coal Mining Museum
- Kingdom Come State Park; Elevation: 2,700 feet (820 m); Size: 1,283 acres (5.19 km^{2}); Location: On the outskirts of the city of Cumberland, and is connected to the Little Shepherd Trail. This state park was named after the popular Civil War novel, The Little Shepherd of Kingdom Come, by Kentucky author John Fox Jr. The park contains a picnic area, hiking trails, a fishing lake, a cave amphitheater, several lookouts and natural rock formations, including Log Rock and Raven Rock. It is the site of the annual Kentucky Black Bear Festival.
- Martins Fork Lake
- Pine Mountain Settlement School

== Communities ==
=== Cities ===
- Benham
- Cumberland
- Evarts
- Harlan (county seat)
- Loyall
- Lynch

=== Census-designated places ===
- Ages
- Cawood
- Coldiron
- Kenvir
- Pathfork
- South Wallins
- Wallins Creek

=== Other unincorporated communities ===
- Alva
- Baxter
- Blair
- Bledsoe
- Brookside
- Chad
- Closplint
- Cranks
- Dayhoit
- Elcomb
- Fresh Meadows
- Grays Knob
- Gulston
- Highsplint
- Hiram
- Holmes Mill
- Putney
- Pine Mountain
- Rosspoint
- Smith
- Tacky Town
- Teetersville
- Totz
- Verda

== Notable people ==
- Bernie Bickerstaff, NBA coach
- Rebecca Caudill, author of children's books
- Jerry Chesnut, country music songwriter
- Carl H. Dodd, Korean War soldier and Medal of Honor recipient
- Boyd Holbrook, actor
- Wah Wah Jones, NBA player
- Nick Lachey, singer, actor
- Cawood Ledford, University of Kentucky basketball and football announcer
- George Ella Lyon, author and poet
- Florence Reece, songwriter
- Louise Slaughter, Congresswoman
- Jordan Smith, Winner of The Voice

== In popular culture ==
=== Literature ===
Elmore Leonard's novels Pronto, Riding the Rap, and Raylan feature Raylan Givens, a Harlan County native, and his short story "Fire in the Hole" has Givens returning to Harlan.

In the James Jones novel "From Here to Eternity", Robert E. Lee Prewitt, a bugler in the Army and the main character, is from Harlan County.

In the Nicholas Proffitt novel "Gardens of Stone", the main character, Army soldier Jackie Willow's family is from Harlan County.

=== Music ===
Harlan County is mentioned in many versions of the 18th-century folk song "Shady Grove". The famous labor song, "Which Side Are You On?", was written by Florence Reece in 1931 in and about Harlan. It has been covered by many artists from Pete Seeger and the Almanac Singers to Billy Bragg, the Dropkick Murphys, and Natalie Merchant. Harlan is mentioned in the Aaron Watson song "Kentucky Coal Miner's Prayer".

It is mentioned in Robert Mitchum's recording "Ballad of Thunder Road" as a stop along a moonshine route. It is the subject of the Darrell Scott song "You'll Never Leave Harlan Alive", which has been covered by Brad Paisley, Dave Alvin, Kathy Mattea, and Patti Loveless, among others, and has been heard in several versions on the TV drama Justified. Dave Alvin also wrote and performed his song, "Harlan County Line" for an episode of Justified.

Dierks Bentley's song "Down in the Mine", on his Up on the Ridge album, mentions Harlan. The band Spear of Destiny included the song "Harlan County", on their 1985 album World Service. Harlan County is mentioned in the Merle Travis song Nine Pound Hammer which he wrote in 1939; it has been covered by many bluegrass artists including Doc Watson.

Wayne Kemp wrote and recorded a song called "Harlan County". Harlan County is also the name of the first album by Jim Ford, 1969, as well as a song bearing the same name. The Dave Alvin song "Harlan County Line" takes place around the area of Harlan. Singer/Songwriter Loudon Wainwright III included a song titled "Harlan County" on his 2014 album I Haven't Got The Blues (Yet). Harlan County is mentioned as the setting of the David Allan Coe song "Daddy Was A God Fearin' Man" in his 1977 album Tattoo.

Steve Earle wrote and recorded "Harlan Man" included on the 1999 Grammy-nominated album " The Mountain" recorded with the Del McCoury Band.

The Cast Iron Filter song "Harlan County, USA" from the 2000 album "Further Down the Line" recounts a dramatization of the Eastover/Brookside coal miners' strike.

=== Films ===
- Harlan County, USA (1976). Documentary film directed by Barbara Kopple depicting the Eastover/Brookside coal miners' strike, which won the Academy Award for Best Documentary Feature.
- Harlan County War (2000). Dramatic film based on the Eastover/Brookside strike. Directed by Tony Bill and starring Holly Hunter.
- Thunder Road (film) (1958). Dramatic film about moonshiners based in Harlan County and starring Robert Mitchum.

=== Television ===
- The FX television series Justified (2010–15), created by Graham Yost and based on Elmore Leonard's Raylan Givens novels and short story, is set in the U.S. federal district of Eastern Kentucky and prominently in Harlan County. The show was filmed in California and Pennsylvania, however, not in Kentucky.
- Kentucky Justice, a reality TV show on National Geographic Channel, is set in Harlan County and follows Sheriff Marvin J. Lipfird & his department.

== See also ==
- National Register of Historic Places listings in Harlan County, Kentucky
