= Roxana, Kentucky =

Unincorporated community in Kentucky, United States

- Unincorporated community
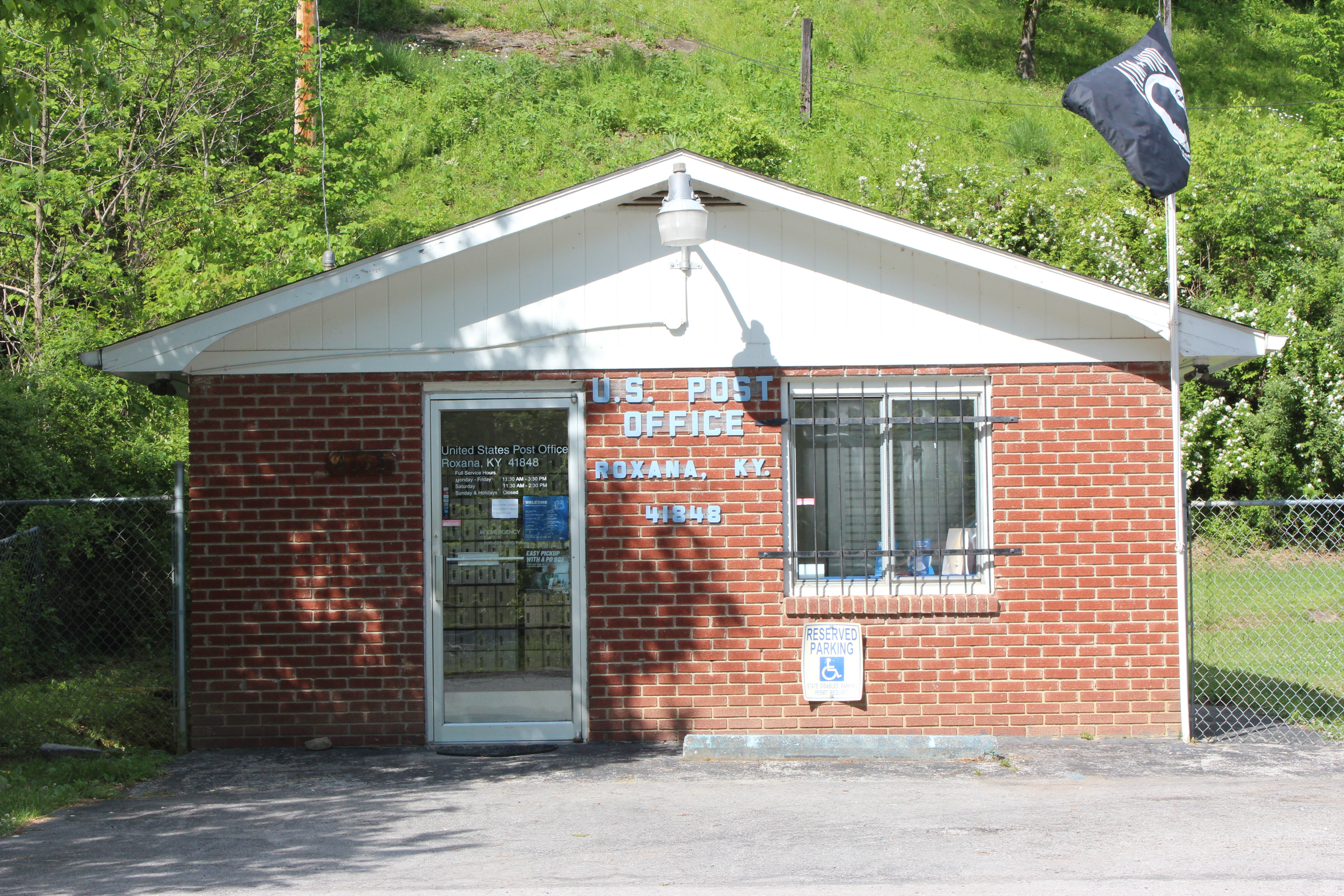
- Post office

- Location in Kentucky Location in the United States
- Coordinates: 37°6′40″N 82°57′00″W
- Country: United States
- State: Kentucky
- County: Letcher
- Elevation: 1,070 ft (330 m)

Population (2020)
  - Total: 108
- Time zone: UTC-5 (Eastern (EST))
  - Summer (DST): UTC-4 (EDT)
- ZIP codes: 41848
- GNIS feature ID: 502435

Roxana is an unincorporated community located in Letcher County, Kentucky, United States. It lies at the intersection of KY 588 and KY 160 on the North Fork of the Kentucky River near its confluence with Kings Creek. The 2020 US census records a population of 108 in Roxana, an 11% decrease since 2000.

Representative Hal Rogers has proposed construction of a federal prison in Roxana.
