= Interstate 69 in Kentucky =

Interstate Highway in Kentucky, United States

Interstate 69
- I-69 highlighted in red, future route highlighted in blue, and proposed route highlighted in pink

Route information
- Maintained by KYTC
- Length: 148.090 mi (238.328 km)
- Existed: October 25, 2011–present
- History: Signed into law in 2008; Calvert City to Nortonville signed on October 25, 2011; Nortonville to Henderson signed on November 16, 2015; Mayfield to Calvert City signed in July 2018; Fulton to Mayfield signed in December 2024
- NHS: Entire route

Major junctions
- South end: Future I-69 / US 51 at the Tennessee state line in Fulton
- US 51 in Fulton; US 45 Byp. in Mayfield; KY 80 in Mayfield; US 45 in Mayfield; US 641 Spur near Benton; US 68 in Draffenville; I-24 from Calvert City to Eddyville; I-169 / Future I-569 / Western Kentucky Parkway near Nortonville; US 41 in Madisonville
- North end: US 41/KY 3690 in Henderson

Location
- Country: United States
- State: Kentucky
- Counties: Fulton, Hickman, Graves, Marshall, Livingston, Lyon, Caldwell, Hopkins, Webster, Henderson

Highway system
- Interstate Highway System; Main; Auxiliary; Suffixed; Business; Future; Kentucky State Highway System; Interstate; US; State; Parkways
← US 68	→ KY 69

Interstate 69 (I-69) in the U.S. state of Kentucky is a 148.1-mile-long (238.3 km) Interstate Highway running from the Tennessee state line in the southwest at Fulton to Henderson in the northeast, just south of the Ohio River. The route incorporates much of the former state parkway system, including the entire Purchase Parkway from Fulton to Calvert City, the western third of the Western Kentucky Parkway from Eddyville to Nortonville, and the northern half of the Pennyrile Parkway from Nortonville to Henderson. Between Calvert City and Eddyville, I-69 runs concurrently with I-24. Eventually, I-69 will leave the former Pennyrile Parkway just northeast of Henderson before heading north into Indiana. The proposed route for the remainder of I-69 in Kentucky travels about 6 miles (9.7 km) before exiting on a bridge across the Ohio River to Indiana; construction on the first segment began in 2022, with completion scheduled in 2031.

I-69 has been divided into three sections of independent utility (SIUs) through Kentucky. SIU 4 includes the new bridge over the Ohio River between Henderson and Evansville, Indiana. The proposed funding formula calls for Kentucky to finance two-thirds of the projected $1.4-billion bridge, while Indiana would pay for the remaining third. SIUs 5 and 6 encompassed previously existing freeways. Federal legislation designated the route for these sections, and Kentucky installed I-69 signs along the route.

== Route description ==
I-69 in Kentucky begins at the Tennessee state line at Fulton. It travels north on the former Purchase Parkway to Mayfield, where it bypasses the city to the west and north, passing interchanges with KY 80, KY 121, and US 45, after which it heads northeast away from the city, passing through rural areas of Western Kentucky. Exit 41 provides access to US 641 in Benton. I-69 interchanges with US 68 at exit 47 near Draffenville. Just south of Calvert City, I-24 from the west joins I-69. The two highways run concurrently for 17 miles (27 km), crossing over the Tennessee and Cumberland rivers and interchanging with US 62 twice. At exit 42 of I-24, I-69 splits off and heads northeast, serving the communities of Princeton and Dawson Springs. At exit 106, the highway meets the western terminus of the Western Kentucky Parkway and the northern terminus of I-169. I-69 then makes a sweeping curve to the north, passing by Mortons Gap, Madisonville, and Sebree. A trumpet interchange with KY 425 is located in the southern part of Henderson. Immediately after KY 425 is the western terminus of the Audubon Parkway. I-69 in Kentucky meets its current northern terminus at US 41 in Henderson.

== History ==
On May 15, 2006, then-Kentucky governor Ernie Fletcher announced that I-69 will encompass 130 miles (210 km) of existing parkways and a 17-mile-long (27 km) segment of I-24. To reflect this decision by state and federal officials, crews began erecting Future I-69 signs along the following highway segments:

- The Western Kentucky Parkway between I-24 and the Pennyrile Parkway, 38 miles (61 km)
- The Pennyrile Parkway between the Western Kentucky Parkway and US 41, 41 miles (66 km)

=== Federal legislation ===
On May 2, 2008, the United States House of Representatives passed HR-1195 (SAFETEA-LU Technical Corrections Act of 2008) which designates the Pennyrile Parkway from Henderson to Nortonville and the Western Kentucky Parkway from Nortonville to I-24 at Eddyville as Future I-69. It further designates the Audubon Parkway as a future spur (I-X69) of I-69 once necessary upgrades are completed. President George W. Bush signed the bill on June 6, 2008, and Future I-69 signs began appearing on the parkways in the middle of 2008. This legislation applied the Future I-69 designation to the following roadways:

- Pennyrile Parkway from just south of the Audubon Parkway in Henderson to the Western Kentucky Parkway in Nortonville (future I-569)
- Western Kentucky Parkway from the Pennyrile Parkway to I-24 in Eddyville
- I-24 from Eddyville to the Purchase Parkway in Calvert City
- Purchase Parkway from I-24 to the US 51 interchange at the Tennessee state line

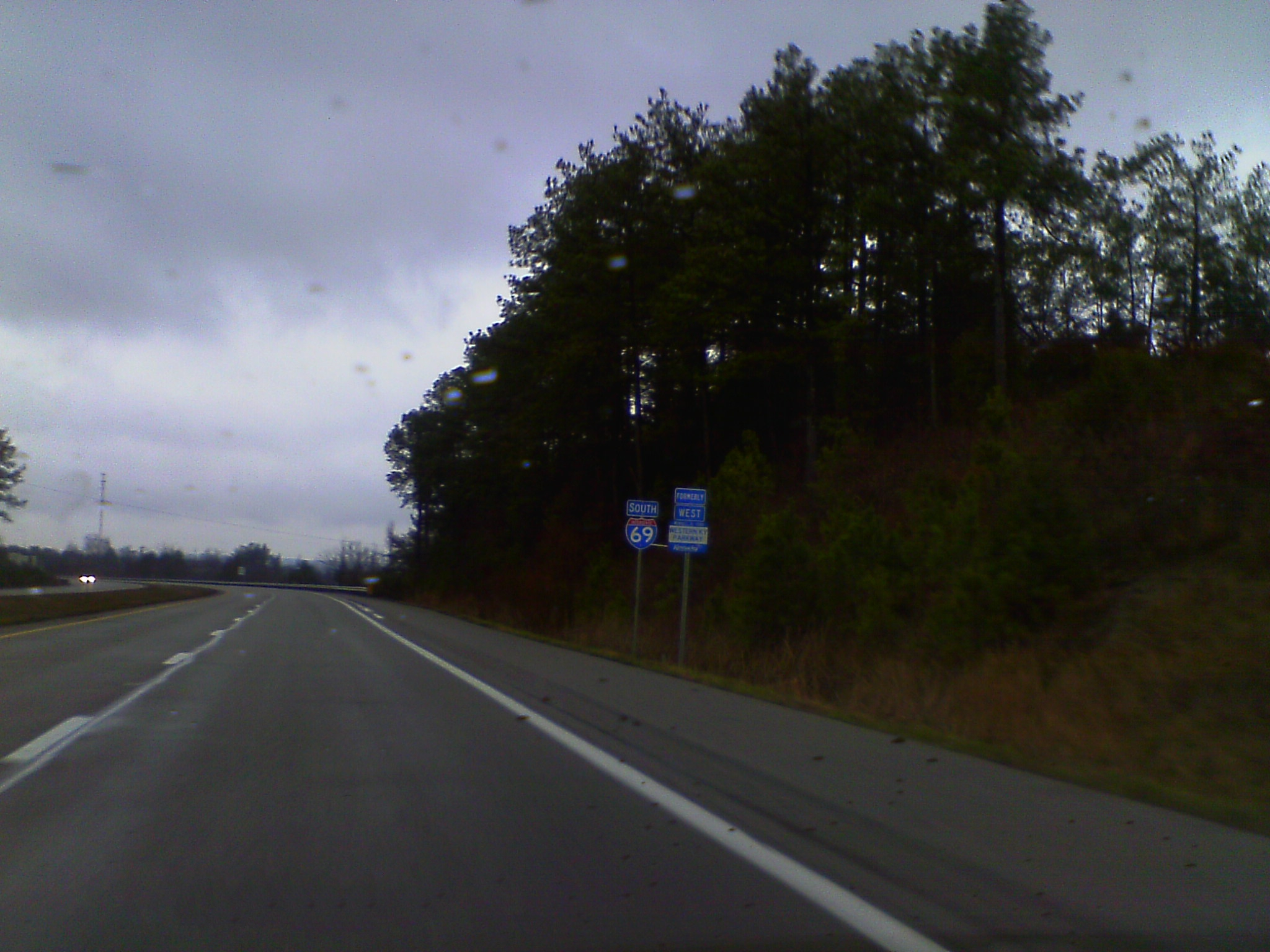
I-69 concurrent with Western Kentucky Parkway near Dawson Springs during transition period; now only I-69

All four highways are now signed as I-69. Signage and milemarker posts were changed in mid-December 2012.

=== SIU 4 ===
SIU 4 is still in the planning stages, but Kentucky and Indiana had planned to finance a new bridge across the Ohio River with tolls. The preferred alternative for SIU 4 was to leave the Pennyrile Parkway near its north end and cross the Ohio River to the former I-164 near Evansville, Indiana, and then use the former I-164 to I-64. All of I-164 was redesignated as I-69 in 2014, but the Ohio River bridge plan had stalled in the late 2000s and early 2010s, due to lack of funding from both states. However, with the completion of SIU 5 in Kentucky and with I-69 connected to Indianapolis via Indiana State Road 37 in Indiana, both states made completing the Ohio River Bridge a top priority.

On June 30, 2016, then-Indiana Governor Mike Pence and then-Kentucky Governor Matt Bevin announced an agreement to resume environmental studies and developed a funding strategy to complete the Ohio River Bridge and its approaches. Indiana contributed $17 million to restart and led the environmental studies that culminated in an approved EIS and ROD that allowed construction to begin. Environmental studies have taken three years to complete, with right-of-way acquisition and construction expected to begin thereafter. Parsons Transportation Group, a California-based firm with offices in Indiana, was picked to complete environmental and preliminary design work on November 15, 2016. Kentucky has committed over $43 million in its 2016 Six-Year Highway Plan for design and right-of-way acquisition for the bridge.

Kentucky Governor Andy Beshear has proposed $267 million in his first Six-Year Highway Plan for the I-69 bridge. Of that, $77 million would become available from 2020 to 2022 and the rest from 2023 to 2026. The proposed money source developed the project and then began a portion of construction running from KY 425/Henderson Bypass to US 60. Due to the financial situation regarding the current COVID-19 pandemic, only $37 million was approved due to possible budget deficits.

On September 16, 2021, a combined final EIS and ROD was issued. On December 21, 2021, the first of two contracts for the bridge was awarded (running from the I-69/KY 425 interchange to US 60, more than six miles (9.7 km) in total length). It went to the design–build bid of Ragle Inc. and Stantec Consulting Services, Inc. for $158 million. Groundbreaking took place on June 23, 2022, and construction of the first phase was scheduled to complete in late 2025 at $257 million. This segment was opened to traffic on November 8, 2025, with section between US 41 and US 60 being temporarily designated as Kentucky Route 3690 (KY 3690). Construction for phase 2 will begin 2027. It will extend I-69 from US 60 to Evansville, Indiana, including a new bridge over the Ohio River. It is expected to be completed in 2031, in which I-69 will connect Indiana to Kentucky.

=== SIU 5 ===
A 2007 engineering study for SIU 5 identified then-current conditions along the Pennyrile and Western Kentucky parkways. The report identified seven overpasses that fell short of the 16-foot (4.9 m) minimum vertical clearance necessary for Interstate Highways. An additional 28 mainline bridges were identified for not meeting the minimum horizontal clearance of 38 feet (12 m). Most—if not all—of the aforementioned bridges were built during construction of the parkways in the 1960s and are nearing the end of their serviceable lifespans and due to be replaced. The main issues concerning the 16 interchanges in SIU 5 were short acceleration/deceleration lanes (the average is 615 feet (187 m) while Interstate standards mandate 1,200 feet (370 m)) and tight curve radiuses at interchanges with loop ramps. A particular challenge was reconfiguring the cloverleaf interchange between the Pennyrile and Western Kentucky parkways in Nortonville to accommodate the future movement of traffic primarily between points north and points west.

According to the Kentucky Transportation Cabinet (KYTC) 2006 Six-Year Transportation Plan Executive Summary, the KYTC "recently completed a study of the parkway upgrade needs from Interstate 24 to Henderson" (SIU 5). The summary further stated that "Continuing work on Interstate 69 in Kentucky will depend upon the financial support that can be garnered for the project through federal reauthorization and appropriations processes". The Transportation Plan estimated that the cost of upgrading the parkways would be about $700 million.

Nonetheless, the required improvements may be performed on individual segments of the parkways when the existing road surfaces reach the end of their lifespans, in what are known as "Pavement Preservation Projects". During a pavement preservation project, the existing pavement is removed, repairs are made to the highway's sub-base, and the road is then resurfaced. During such a project, bridges and overpasses may be rehabilitated or replaced, drainage systems are upgraded, and other modifications are made to improve safety on the road without completely reconstructing it, allowing it to remain at least partially open during construction.

Two projects on the Pennyrile Parkway and the Western Kentucky Parkway in Hopkins County were evidence that Kentucky took this approach. In 2007, work began on a $14.9-million (equivalent to $22.3 million in 2025) project to replace seven miles (11 km) of pavement on the Pennyrile Parkway segment slated for the I-69 designation. A similar $23-million project (equivalent to $36.4 million in 2025) in 2005 replaced and upgraded 11 miles (18 km) of pavement on the Western Kentucky Parkway west of the interchange with the Pennyrile Parkway, which was also slated to become part of I-69.

Several public meetings were held in towns along the parkways in late November and early December 2007 where Kentucky officials provided detailed information on upgrading the parkways, including changes to the projected cost for the upgrades. The adjusted cost of upgrading the parkways in SIUs 5 and 6 was pegged at around $300 million, significantly lower than initial estimates of $700 million. Of that $300-million pricetag, high-priority projects accounted for about half ($145 million) of the total cost. Kentucky transportation officials also raised the idea of applying for a waiver that would allow the parkways to immediately be signed as I-69, making the parkways eligible for federal Interstate Highway funds to complete the upgrades. Without the I-69 designation, the parkway sections slated to become I-69 would not be eligible for Interstate Highway funds for upgrades. Kentucky officials announced that no funding for I-69 was included in the 2008–2014 Transportation Improvement Plan.

In January 2010, then Governor Steve Beshear released the next draft Six-Year Plan for consideration by the Kentucky General Assembly. The proposed plan included the reconstruction of several interchanges on the Pennyrile and Western Kentucky parkways. The proposed work would upgrade the interchanges to Interstate standards as required to get the parkways signed as I-69. Pending approval and funding, the interchange work would begin in 2012 and be finished by 2015.

In 2014, work began on the required upgrades to the Pennyrile Parkway in anticipation of the I-69 designation. The cloverleaf interchange with I-69/Western Kentucky Parkway was modified to allow highspeed movements between points north and points west. During the same time frame, several interchanges along the Pennyrile were also reconstructed, and cable barriers were installed in the median. In April 2015, the KYTC awarded a $3-million contract (equivalent to $3.98 million in 2025) to install I-69 and US 41 signs on the Pennyrile Parkway. The work was completed on November 16, 2015.

=== SIU 6 ===
From Eddyville, I-69 follows I-24 for 17 miles (27 km), then turns southwest onto the former Purchase Parkway. I-69's designation along the Purchase Parkway from I-24 to the Tennessee state line at South Fulton, Tennessee, was written into law with the fiscal year 2002 Transportation Appropriations Bill. However, many of the same issues that were addressed in SIU 5 arose in SIU 6 as well, and the Commonwealth of Kentucky similarly upgraded the Purchase Parkway. The massive interchange with US 45 and US 51 at the Tennessee state line in South Fulton is the main challenge for completing SIU 6 and has been broken out as a separate project from SIUs 6 and 7.

Kentucky is the only state that routed nearly its entire portion of I-69 over existing freeways, allowing the state to avoid years of costly environmental studies, and thereby enabling the KYTC to upgrade the parkways to I-69 as soon as funding becomes available. Technically, the Commonwealth of Kentucky could’ve requested a waiver from the American Association of State Highway and Transportation Officials (AASHTO) that would allow the state to apply the I-69 designation to its parkways before upgrades are completed, but this would only be able to have been done if adjoining segments in Tennessee or Indiana were completed first.

The Purchase Parkway was designated as future I-69, but the route could not be signed as I-69 until several interchanges, including the interchange with I-24, were upgraded to Interstate standards. The northern portion of the parkway between Mayfield and I-24, including the reconfiguration of the KY 348 interchange at Benton from a toll-booth design (with opposing loop ramps) to a diamond interchange, the installation of cable barriers in the narrow parkway median, and resurfacing of the mainline to increase bridge clearances and lengthen merge lanes at other interchanges along this section was part of the upgrade to I-69. A $37-million contract (equivalent to $49 million in 2025) to reconstruct the I-24/Purchase Parkway interchange was awarded to Jim Smith Contracting Company on November 20, 2015. Construction on the I-24/Purchase Parkway interchange began on February 29, 2016, with the project completed in early July 2018. A similar contract to reconstruct the parkway interchanges at the south end of the Mayfield Bypass (exit 21) and KY 80 was let in February 2016. The section of the Purchase Parkway north of Mayfield received I-69 signage in July 2018. A contract for the conversion of the last remaining tollbooth-style interchange requiring reconfiguration, located at KY 339 in Wingo (exit 14), was awarded again awarded to Jim Smith Contracting Company in December 2022 for $33.9 million. The project would turn this exit into a diamond interchange with extended ramps to meet interstate standards. The pre-existing ramps were expected to be closed for up to 90 days between July 10 – October 10, 2023 as the construction project began. Improvements to the exits 1 (US 51) and 2 (KY 307) will also be made. Construction to upgrade the remaining southern half of the Purchase Parkway to I-69 between the Tennessee state line at Fulton and US 45 Bypass in Mayfield began in 2022 and was completed in December 2024, with I-69 signage being installed and the roadway being officially redesignated.

=== SIU 7 ===
The interchange between I-69, US 45, and US 51 straddles the Tennessee state line between the cities of Fulton, Kentucky, and South Fulton, Tennessee. Officially part of SIU 7, the interchange was broken out from the environmental impact statement (EIS) prepared by the Tennessee Department of Transportation (TDOT) for SIU 7 at a time when Tennessee was moving forward with planning for the remainder of SIU 7 (all of which, except for a 1.5-mile (2.4 km) section of the Purchase Parkway approaching the Fulton–South Fulton interchange, lies within Tennessee). It was agreed upon by the Federal Highway Administration (FHWA), the KYTC, and TDOT to prepare a separate environmental assessment (EA)/EIS for the Fulton–South Fulton interchange when both states were ready to perform its reconfiguration to accommodate I-69. As Tennessee continues to make progress toward completing the unbuilt portion of SIU 7 to the south and Kentucky's upgrades to the Purchase Parkway from the north, both states indicated their intention to start work on reconfiguring the Fulton–South Fulton interchange. A joint EA/EIS will be prepared by the KYTC and TDOT and submitted to the FHWA for a record of decision (ROD) prior to right-of-way acquisition and construction. The 2016 Kentucky Six Year Road Plan includes $7.8 million in fiscal years 2019 through 2022 to complete environmental studies, ROW acquisition, and utility relocation in anticipation of reconstructing the interchange thereafter. It is scheduled to begin construction in 2028.

== Exit list ==
County	Location	mi	km	Old exit	New exit	Destinations	Notes
Fulton	Fulton	0.000	0.000			Future I-69 south / US 51 south	Continuation into Tennessee; south end of US 51 concurrency
Fulton	Fulton	0.030	0.048		0	To KY 116 / KY 166 – Weigh Station, Fulton, Hickman	Fulton / Hickman not signed northbound, KY 116 / Weigh Station not signed southbound
Fulton	Fulton	1.424	2.292		1	US 51 north – Clinton, Fulton	North end of US 51 concurrency
Fulton	Fulton	2.478	3.988		2	KY 307 – Fulton	
Graves	Wingo	13.645	21.959		14	KY 339 – Wingo, Clinton	Converted to a diamond interchange in 2023
Graves	Mayfield	21.285– 21.887	34.255– 35.224		21	US 45 Byp. south	Southern end of US 45 Bypass concurrency
Graves	Mayfield	22.267	35.835		22	KY 80 – Fancy Farm, Mayfield	
Graves	Mayfield	23.701	38.143		24	KY 121 – Wickliffe, Mayfield	
Graves	Mayfield	24.713	39.772		25	US 45 / US 45 Byp. ends – Paducah, Mayfield	Northern end of US 45 Bypass concurrency
Graves	Mayfield	27.461	44.194		27	KY 131 – Airport	
Marshall	Benton	40.809	65.676		41	US 641 Spur south – Hardin, Murray	
Marshall	Benton	42.555	68.486		43	KY 348 – Benton, Symsonia	
Marshall	Draffenville	46.942	75.546		47	US 68 – Kenlake State Park, Kentucky Lake Recreation Area	
Marshall	Calvert City	51.398	82.717		51 25	I-24 west / KY 1523 north to US 62 – Paducah, Fulton, Calvert City	Western end of I-24 concurrency; signed as exits 51A (east) and 51B (west); I-24 exits signed as exits 25A (south) and 25B (north)
Marshall	Calvert City	53.002	85.298		27	US 62 – Kentucky Dam	
Livingston		57.166	92.000		31	KY 453 – Smithland, Grand Rivers	Serves Land Between the Lakes National Recreation Area
Lyon		65.938	106.117		40	US 62 / US 641 – Eddyville, Kuttawa	
Lyon	Eddyville	68.084	109.571	1	42 68	I-24 east – Nashville	Eastern end of I-24 concurrency; I-69 exits signed as exits 68A (east) and 68B (west)
Lyon	Eddyville	71.784	115.525	4	71	US 62 – Eddyville	Serves Mineral Mound State Park
Caldwell	Princeton	79.771	128.379	12	79	KY 91 / KY 139 – Marion, Princeton	Serves Lake Barkley State Resort Park
Caldwell	Princeton	81.189	130.661	13	81	KY 293 – Providence, Princeton	
Hopkins	Dawson Springs	92.506	148.874	24	92	KY 109 – Dawson Springs, Providence	Serves Pennyrile Forest State Resort Park
Hopkins	Nortonville	105.707– 106.767	170.119– 171.825	38 34	106	I-169 south / Western Kentucky Parkway east – Hopkinsville, Elizabethtown	I-169 exits 34A-B-C; signed as exits 106A (south I-169) & 106B (east WKP); cloverleaf interchange with directional ramp for NB I-69 through movement.
Hopkins	Mortons Gap	108.886	175.235	37	108	KY 813 – Mortons Gap	
Hopkins	Earlington	111.604	179.609	40	111	KY 2171 – Earlington, Madisonville	
Hopkins	Madisonville	114.254	183.874	42	114	KY 70 – Madisonville, Central City	
Hopkins	Madisonville	116.164	186.948	44	116	KY 281 to US 41 Alt. – Madisonville, Providence	Serves Madisonville Community College
Hopkins	Madisonville	117.042	188.361	45	117	US 41 north – Madisonville	Northbound exit and southbound entrance
Hopkins	Hanson	120.818	194.438	49	120	KY 260 – Hanson	
Webster	Slaughters	125.906	202.626	54	125	KY 138 – Dixon, Calhoun	
Webster	Sebree	134.461	216.394	63	134	KY 56 – Sebree, Owensboro	
Henderson	Robards	140.195	225.622	68	140	KY 416 – Niagara, Robards	
Henderson	Henderson	148.090	238.328	76	148	US 41 south to KY 425 – Morganfield	Serves Henderson Community College and the Henderson City-County Airport; southern end of US 41 concurrency
Henderson	Henderson	149.086	239.931	77	149	Audubon Parkway east – Owensboro	Future I-69 Spur/I-369
Henderson	Henderson	151.142	243.239	79	151	KY 351 – Zion, Henderson	
Henderson	Henderson	152.455	245.353		152A	KY 3690 north to US 60 – Owensboro	Future I-69 north; exit opened on November 8, 2025
Henderson	Henderson	152.455	245.353		152B	US 41 north – Henderson, Evansville	Northern end of US 41 concurrency completed in June 2025
Henderson	Henderson	Temporary northern terminus of I-69 at US 41					
Henderson	Henderson	154.284	248.296		154	US 60 – Henderson, Owensboro	Northern end of section 1 on the Ohio River Crossing project opened on November 8, 2025, and is currently signed as KY 3690; southern end of section 2 on the Ohio River Crossing project; under construction; to be completed by 2031
Ohio River		157.811	253.972	I-69 Ohio River Crossing; Kentucky–Indiana line			
Ohio River		157.811	253.972			I-69 north to I-64 – Evansville, Indianapolis	Future continuation into Indiana; to be completed by 2031
1.000 mi = 1.609 km; 1.000 km = 0.621 mi: Concurrency terminus; Incomplete access; Unopened

== Auxiliary routes ==
- I-169: Includes the first 34.271 miles (55.154 km) of the former Edward T. Breathitt Pennyrile Parkway from I-24 in Christian County to the I-69/Western Kentucky Parkway junction near Nortonville.
- I-369: A proposed auxiliary route to run the current course of the Audubon Parkway from Henderson to Owensboro. It is currently listed as "Future Interstate 69 Spur."
- I-569: Another proposed auxiliary route to run the current course of the Western Kentucky Parkway from its current western terminus at I-69 to the junction with I-165.

== See also ==
Interstate 69
Previous state: Tennessee	Kentucky	Next state: Indiana
