= Mortons Gap, Kentucky =

- City
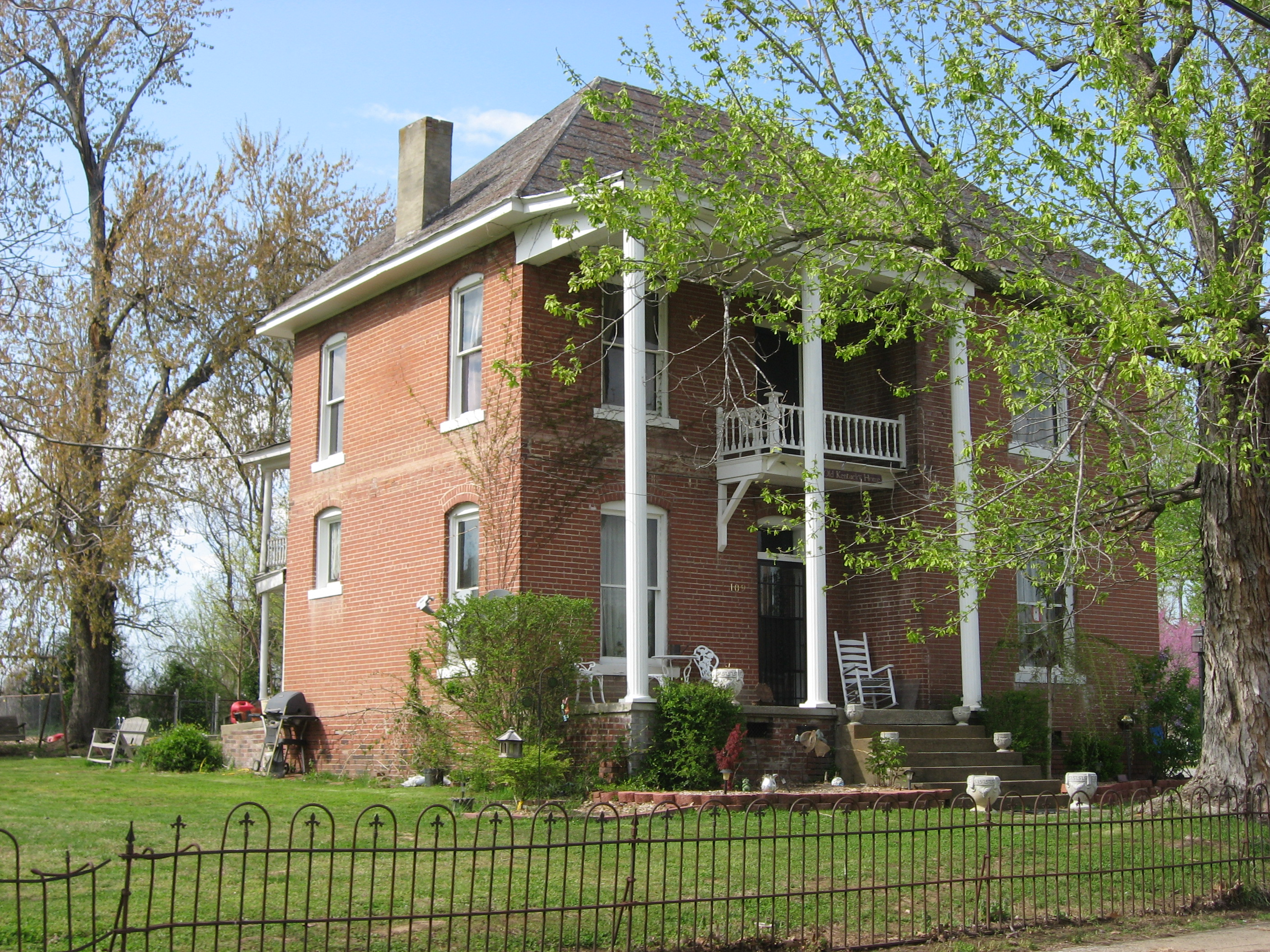
- The W.W. Kington House, a local landmark

- Location of Mortons Gap in Hopkins County, Kentucky.
- Coordinates: 37°14′17″N 87°28′25″W
- Country: United States
- State: Kentucky
- County: Hopkins
- Incorporated: 1888
- Named for: a local landowner

Area
  - Total: 1.19 sq mi (3.09 km^{2})
  - Land: 1.19 sq mi (3.07 km^{2})
  - Water: 0.0077 sq mi (0.02 km^{2})
- Elevation: 472 ft (144 m)

Population (2020)
  - Total: 728
  - Density: 614.8/sq mi (237.38/km^{2})
- Time zone: UTC-6 (Central (CST))
  - Summer (DST): UTC-5 (CDT)
- ZIP code: 42440
- Area codes: 270 & 364
- FIPS code: 21-53616
- GNIS feature ID: 0498645
- Website: mortonsgap.ky.gov

Mortons Gap is a home rule-class city in Hopkins County, Kentucky, in the United States. The population was 728 at the 2020 census, down from 863 at the 2010 census.

== Name ==
The city is named after Virginia native, Thomas Morton, who settled the area in 1804 with his wife Elizabeth (maiden name Davis), and children. The city is now spelled without an apostrophe by the city, the state land office, and the U.S. Board on Geographic Names. The eponymous gap is now traversed by U.S. Route 41.

== Geography ==
Mortons Gap is located in southeastern Hopkins County at 37°14′17″N 87°28′25″W (37.238098, -87.473484). Via U.S. 41 it is 7 miles (11 km) south of Madisonville, the county seat, and 3 miles (5 km) north of Nortonville. Interstate 69 passes east of Mortons Gap, with access from Exit 37, an area which has recently been annexed by the city. I-69 leads north past Madisonville 43 miles (69 km) to Henderson and south 2 miles (3 km) to the Western Kentucky Parkway. Hopkinsville is 28 miles (45 km) south of Mortons Gap via I-69 and the Pennyrile Parkway.

According to the United States Census Bureau, the city of Mortons Gap has a total area of 1.2 square miles (3.0 km^{2}), of which 0.01 square miles (0.02 km^{2}), or 0.63%, are water.

== Demographics ==
Historical population
Census	Pop.	Note	%±
1880	241		—
1890	548		127.4%
1900	885		61.5%
1910	1,266		43.1%
1920	1,061		−16.2%
1930	1,068		0.7%
1940	1,072		0.4%
1950	1,081		0.8%
1960	1,308		21.0%
1970	1,169		−10.6%
1980	1,201		2.7%
1990	987		−17.8%
2000	952		−3.5%
2010	863		−9.3%
2020	728		−15.6%
U.S. Decennial Census

As of the census of 2000, there were 952 people, 396 households, and 283 families residing in the city. The population density was 987.4 inhabitants per square mile (381.2/km^{2}). There were 447 housing units at an average density of 463.6 per square mile (179.0/km^{2}). The racial makeup of the city was 95.59% White, 3.26% Black or African American, 0.11% Asian, 0.32% from other races, and 0.74% from two or more races. Hispanic or Latino of any race were 0.21% of the population.

There were 396 households, of which 27.5% had children under the age of 18 living with them, 55.1% were married couples living together, 13.6% had a female householder with no husband present, and 28.3% were non-families. 26.0% of all households were made up of individuals, and 14.6% had someone living alone who was 65 years of age or older. The average household size was 2.40 and the average family size was 2.87.

In the city, the population was spread out, with 22.6% under the age of 18, 10.2% from 18 to 24, 28.5% from 25 to 44, 21.2% from 45 to 64, and 17.5% who were 65 years of age or older. The median age was 38 years. For every 100 females, there were 88.5 males. For every 100 females age 18 and over, there were 81.1 males.

The median income for a household in the city was $27,031, and the median income for a family was $34,276. Males had a median income of $28,333 versus $17,105 for females. The per capita income for the city was $13,875. About 10.9% of families and 13.9% of the population were below the poverty line, including 18.4% of those under age 18 and 10.3% of those age 65 or over.

== The Home of Thomas Morton ==
When Thomas Morton and his young family settled the area in 1804, Thomas bought a large quantity of land in the vicinity of what is now Mortons Gap and built a brick house, the first of Hopkins County, Kentucky. This lovely home stood for another 132 years until it was finally destroyed by fire on September 16, 1936. The former Morton home would soon be occupied by the Mortons Gap school, and many decades later it is now home to the Vineyard Worship Center. This historic site is located at 37.24018428546551, -87.47409897503029.

Thomas Morton died 8 May 1845 in Mortons Gap, and is buried in the Old Morton Cemetery which is also located in Mortons Gap. A deed dated 15 April 1848 in Hopkins County, Kentucky indicates Thomas Morton owned land on Flat Creek in Mortons Gap. This deed also indicates said land on Flat Creek was distributed to his heirs.

== Local schools ==
In 1936, after the former Morton home was destroyed by fire, the community had the Mortons Gap school built in its location. This school housed a high school until the high school's consolidation to South Hopkins High School in 1955. An elementary and middle school continued to be served at the same location, until the elementary school was consolidated to form Southside Elementary School and the middle school to form South Hopkins Middle School in the mid-1990s. The former school has been renovated and serves the community as a church.
