= Kentucky Route 351 =

State highway in Kentucky, USA

Kentucky Route 351
- KY 351 highlighted in red

Route information
- Maintained by KYTC
- Length: 12.891 mi (20.746 km)

Major junctions
- West end: US 41 Alt. / US 60 in Henderson
- I-69 / US 41 in Henderson
- East end: KY 416 in Hebbardsville

Location
- Country: United States
- State: Kentucky
- Counties: Henderson

Highway system
- Kentucky State Highway System; Interstate; US; State; Parkways
← KY 350	→ KY 352

Kentucky Route 351 (KY 351) is a 12.891-mile-long (20.746 km) state highway in the U.S. state of Kentucky. The highway connects mostly rural areas of Henderson County with Henderson.

== Route description ==
KY 351 begins at an intersection with US 41 Alt./US 60 (North Green Street) in the west-central part of Henderson, within Henderson County, where the roadway continues as 2nd Street. It travels to the southeast and crosses over some railroad tracks of CSX and the North Fork Canoe Creek before it passes North Middle School. It intersects the northern terminus of KY 2084 and then has an interchange with US 41 and the northern terminus of the Pennyrile Parkway (future Interstate 69 (I-69)). It passes Henderson County High School before it intersects the western terminus of KY 1539 (Larue Road). The highway passes East Heights Elementary School just before it leaves the city limits of Henderson. In Graham Hill, it intersects the southern terminus of KY 2183 (Holloway Lane). It crosses over a drainage ditch and curves to the east before it enters Zion. There, it has a brief concurrency with KY 1078. The highway heads to the east-southeast and then back to the southeast. It crosses over Lick Creek before intersecting the northern terminus of KY 2249 (C. N. Tillotson Road). It passes Hebbardsville School and curves to the east-northeast. It curves back to the east-southeast, passes the Sandy Lee Watkins Henderson County Park and crosses over a drainage ditch before it curves back to the southeast. KY 351 enters Hebbardsville, where it meets its eastern terminus, an intersection with KY 416.

== History ==
KY 351 was formed between 1973 and 1976.

The original KY 351 ran from US 31W in Cave City to US 31E in Glasgow; this became part of KY 90 except for a small section in Glasgow via Cherry Street and Ford Drive; this section was deleted by 1973.

== Major intersections ==
The entire route is in Henderson County.

Location	mi	km	Destinations	Notes
Henderson	0.000	0.000	US 41 Alt. / US 60 (North Green Street) – Morganfield, Owensboro, Providence	Western terminus
Henderson	1.210	1.947	KY 2084 south to US 41 south	Northern terminus of KY 2084
Henderson	1.353	2.177	I-69 / US 41 to Audubon Parkway – Madisonville, Evansville	I-69 Exit 151
Henderson	1.817	2.924	KY 1539 east (Larue Road)	Western terminus of KY 1539
Graham Hill	3.274	5.269	KY 2183 north (Holloway Lane)	Southern terminus of KY 2183
Zion	6.103	9.822	KY 1078 south to Audubon Parkway	Western end of KY 1078 concurrency
Zion	6.252	10.062	KY 1078 north	Eastern end of KY 1078 concurrency
	9.204	14.812	KY 2249 south (C.N. Tillotson Road)	Northern terminus of KY 2249
Hebbardsville	12.891	20.746	KY 416 to Audubon Parkway	Eastern terminus
1.000 mi = 1.609 km; 1.000 km = 0.621 mi: Concurrency terminus
