= Jim Owen (singer-songwriter) =

American singer-songwriter (1941–2020)

- Born: April 21, 1941; Robards, Kentucky, U.S.
- Died: March 7, 2020 (aged 78)
- Genres: country Western swing
- Occupation: singer and songwriter
- Instrument: guitar

Jim Owen (April 21, 1941 – March 7, 2020) was an American singer-songwriter.

== Biography ==
Owen was born in Robards, Kentucky. When he was eight years old, he saw Hank Williams Sr sing, and from that time, he became completely fascinated by the star and his music. After completing his education, he worked variously as a journalist and as a golf coach until 1969 when, with Mel Tillis’ help, he relocated to Nashville Tennessee, to work as a songwriter.

Over the next few years, several artists had chart hits with his songs. These included "Too Lonely Too Long" and "One More Drink" (both Mel Tillis), "Little Boy’s Prayer" (Porter Wagoner), "Sweet Baby On My Mind" (June Stearns), "Southern Loving" and "Broad Minded Man" (both Jim Ed Brown), "The Telephone" (Jerry Reed) and arguably the best-known of all, "Louisiana Woman, Mississippi Man" (Conway Twitty and Loretta Lynn). He never lost his obsession with Hank Williams, and encouraged by his wife, (who once dreamed that she saw Owen onstage at the Grand Ole Opry, but that it was Williams’ voice that she heard coming from him) he began to recreate his idol as an impressionist or impersonator. He talked with people that had known or worked with Williams and practiced his mannerisms and stage presentation.

In 1976, he presented Hank, a one-hour PBS television special that won him an Emmy award for the best show of the year on public television. He then produced a 90-minute one-man live stage show, An Evening With Hank Williams, which had backing tracks provided by Hank's band, The Drifting Cowboys. He commenced touring extensively with the show and regularly drew audiences of thousands at countless venues.

He also starred in the 1980 film Hank Williams: The Man And His Music, for which he received an Emmy nomination.

In 1978, his Epic recording of "Lovesick Blues" recorded with the "Drifting Cowboys" was a minor chart hit and in the early 1980s, he scored two more minor hits with "Ten Anniversary Presents" and "Hell Yes, I Cheated".

In 1985, he wrote and produced a 10-hour Hank Williams radio show which, on New Year's Day, was broadcast on various U.S. stations as a tribute. Owen has also appeared as Williams for the noted "Legends In Concert" at the Imperial Palace, Las Vegas, Nevada and made many appearances on the Grand Ole Opry, including a special one on January 1, 1993, the 40th anniversary of Williams’ death, which gained him a standing ovation. He continued to tour into the 1990s, still wrote songs and, at times, worked as an auctioneer near his Henderson, Tennessee home. He is also noted for his collection of classic cars.

Owen entertained audiences with his comedy and award-winning musical talent for years in Branson, Missouri. He performed many of the classic songs he wrote for country music stars which became huge hits. Owen won an Emmy Award for his portrayal of Hank Williams Sr. in a made-for-TV movie that he both wrote and starred in. His show was complete with clips and songs of Hank as well as other legendary artists.

Charlie Daniels once called Jim Owen country music's least known country superstar.

In 2012, Owen had only 45 shows scheduled although most years he topped 150. Performances in Branson were curtailed following the 2012 Leap Day tornado outbreak when his Branson Mall venue was destroyed, but he performed again at the Doug Gabriel Theatre for several years after that before retiring.
