= List of Interstate Highways in Kentucky =

- Highway markers for Interstate 75, Interstate 265, and Business Loop 24
- Interstate Highways highlighted in red

Highway names
- Interstates: Interstate nn (I-nn)
- US Highways: U.S. Highway nn (US nn)
- State: Kentucky Route nn (KY nn)

System links
- Kentucky State Highway System; Interstate; US; State; Parkways

This is a list of interstates in Kentucky.

== Primary highways ==
Number	Length (mi)	Length (km)	Southern or western terminus	Northern or eastern terminus	Formed	Removed	Notes
I-24	94	151	I-24 at the Illinois state line	I-24 at the Tennessee state line	1977	current	Begins at the Illinois border near Paducah and stretches 94 miles (152 km) southeast to the Tennessee border near Oak Grove.
I-64	191	307	I-64 / US 150 at the Indiana state line	I-64 at the West Virginia state line	1956	current	Begins at the Indiana border in Louisville and travels 191 miles (308 km) east to the West Virginia border near Catlettsburg.
I-65	137	220	I-65 at the Tennessee state line	I-65 at the Indiana state line	1956	current	Begins at the Tennessee border near Franklin and travels 137 miles (222 km) north to the Indiana border in Louisville.
I-66	—	—	Missouri state line	West Virginia state line	1991	2015	A proposed interstate highway, now scrapped, that would have run east to west across the southern portion of the state.
I-69	148	238	I-69 / US 51 at the Tennessee state line	I-69 at the Indiana state line	2011	current	President George W. Bush signed legislation declaring portions of both the Pennyrile Parkway and the Western Kentucky Parkway as well as all of the Purchase Parkway as part of the extension of I-69 in June 2008.
I-71	96	154	I-64 / I-65 in Louisville	I-71 / I-75 at the Ohio state line	1959	current	Begins in Louisville and stretches north east 96 miles (154 km) into Ohio while converging in Walton with I-75.
I-75	192	309	I-75 at the Tennessee state line	I-71 / I-75 at the Ohio state line	1956	current	Begins at the Tennessee border near Williamsburg heading north 192 miles (311 km) to Covington.
Former

== Auxiliary highways ==
Number	Length (mi)	Length (km)	Southern or western terminus	Northern or eastern terminus	Formed	Removed	Notes
I-24 BL	11.2	18.0	I-24/US 60 in Paducah	I-24/KY 1954 in Paducah	—	—	Between Exits 4-11 on I-24
I-165	70.184	112.950	I-65 in Bowling Green	US 60 / US 231 in Owensboro	2019	current	Replaced the William H. Natcher Parkway.
I-169	34.271	55.154	I-24 south of Hopkinsville	I-69/Western Kentucky Parkway northeast of Nortonville	2024	current	Replaced the Pennyrile Parkway between Nortonville and Hopkinsville.
I-264	23	37	I-64 west of Louisville	I-71 northeast of Louisville	1956	current	Begins in west Louisville at Interstate 64 and loops to the south for 23 miles (37 km) northeast of Louisville to Interstate 71.
I-265	28.6	46.0	I-65 south of Louisville	I-265 at Indiana state line	1977	current	Begins south of Louisville at Interstate 65 looping around the city to the south and east for 25 miles (40 km) to northeastern Jefferson County at Interstate 71 where the route continues into Indiana (co-signed as KY 841).
I-275	21	34	I-275 at the Indiana state line	I-275 at the Ohio state line	1962	current	Forming a complete beltway around Cincinnati, Ohio, the Kentucky portion runs from Petersburg in the west to Fort Thomas in the east. Officially, Interstate 275 begins and ends in Erlanger.
I-365	92.313	148.563	I-65 near Park City	US 27 in Somerset	proposed	—	Future designation along the Cumberland Parkway
I-369	23.441	37.725	I-69/Pennyrile Parkway in Henderson, KY	US 60 in Owensboro, KY	proposed	—	Proposed for designation along Audubon Parkway once upgraded to Interstate standards
I-471	5.01	8.06	I-275 in Highland Heights, Kentucky	I-471 at the Ohio state line	1981	current	Interstate 471 begins at Interstate 275 near Highland Heights and passes Newport before crossing the Ohio River to terminate at its parent route, Interstate 71, in Cincinnati, Ohio.
I-569	38.446	61.873	I-69/I-169 northeast of Nortonville	I-165 southeast of Beaver Dam	proposed	—	Future designation for a portion of the Western Kentucky Parkway
Former; Proposed and unbuilt

== See also ==
- List of parkways and named highways in Kentucky
