= Pennyrile Parkway =

Former freeway designation in Kentucky

Pennyrile Parkway

Route information
- Maintained by KYTC
- Length: 71.306 mi (114.756 km)
- Existed: 1969–December 2024
- History: Opened in 1969; Nortonville to Henderson redesignated as I-69 and US 41 on November 12, 2015; Hopkinsville to Nortonville redesignated as I-169 in December 2024

Major junctions
- South end: I-24 near Hopkinsville
- US 41 Alt. in Hopkinsville US 41 / KY 109 in Hopkinsville; US 68 / KY 80 in Hopkinsville; US 41 near Nortonville US 62 in Nortonville; Western Kentucky Parkway in Nortonville; Audubon Parkway in Henderson
- North end: I-69 near Madisonville

Location
- Country: United States
- State: Kentucky
- Counties: Christian, Hopkins, Webster, Henderson

Highway system
- Kentucky State Highway System; Interstate; US; State; Parkways

The Edward T. Breathitt Pennyrile Parkway was the designation for a 71.3-mile (114.7 km) freeway from Henderson to Hopkinsville, Kentucky. The parkway originally began at an interchange with the Audubon Parkway and US 41 near the city of Henderson. It travelled south through rolling hills to its former southern terminus at Interstate 24 (I-24) south of Hopkinsville. A seven-mile (11 km) section was left unconstructed from US 41 Alternate south to I-24 despite its approval in 1976 from the Parkway Authority for construction. This connection was completed and opened to the public on March 1, 2011. The first 1.8 miles (2.9 km) of the extension to the US 68 bypass (exit 6) were completed and opened to traffic in September 2008. The construction was then completed to exit 5, with the final section to I-24 opened on March 1, 2011. The parkway's northern terminus was truncated south to the Western Kentucky Parkway in 2013 when Interstate 69 was extended along that section of the highway. The remaining section of the Parkway (from I-69 to I-24) was redesignated as Interstate 169 in December 2024, thereby replacing the last section of the Pennyrile Parkway.

The next phase of the extension—now completed—encompassed the portion of the parkway between US 41 Alternate and I-24. As of May 2010, the Lover's Lane interchange (exit 5) opened to local traffic via US 68 ramp (exit 5). The final segment, from US 68 to I-24, opened on March 1, 2011.

It was one of nine highways that are part of Kentucky's parkway system. The section between the Wendell H. Ford Western Kentucky Parkway near Mortons Gap and the northern terminus in Henderson became part of I-69 with the passage of federal legislation on June 6, 2008. The length of the road carried the unsigned designation Kentucky Route 9004 (EB 9004).

The road was named after Ned Breathitt, a former Kentucky governor. Originally called the Pennyrile Parkway from its opening in October 1969 at a cost of $69.2 million, it was renamed for Breathitt in 2000.

The parkway passed through the cities of Madisonville, Sebree, Mortons Gap, Slaughters, and Earlington. It intersected with the Wendell H. Ford Western Kentucky Parkway near Madisonville.

== History ==
The Pennyrile Parkway previously used a green shield.

=== As a toll road ===
The Pennyrile Parkway, as with all nine parkways, was originally a toll road. By Kentucky state law, toll collection ceases when enough toll has been collected or funds received from other sources, such as a legislative appropriation, to pay off the construction bonds for the parkway. In the case of the Pennyrile, toll booths were removed in 1992 when bonds were paid off ten years ahead of schedule.

A section near the middle of the parkway, in the Madisonville area, during much of the parkway's path through Hopkins County, was free from tolls from the road's opening; this section was also signed as US 41. The US 41 designation has since been removed and applied to the former US 41A through Madisonville and other nearby cities; this road was the original US 41 before the parkway opened. This redesignation followed a horrendous blizzard on January 17, 1994, which forced the then-Kentucky governor Brereton C. Jones to close all Interstates and limited access highways in the state. Heavy trucks were forced to take US 41A through downtown Madisonville for a week, snarling local traffic. The parkway between exits 7 and 9 was also toll free.

Toll plaza locations
Exit	Location	Through cars charge	Enter or Exit	Notes
12	Hopkinsville (at KY 1682)	40 cents	40 cents	
63	Sebree	60 cents	30 cents	Sebree overpass was also charged a toll of 30 cents; now I-69 exit 134
68	Robards	Free	20 cents	Southbound exit and northbound entrance only until the mid-2010s; now I-69 exit 140

=== Upgrades and redesignations ===
In 2008, funding was established for the extension of Interstate 69 through Kentucky as a part of a larger nationwide project to extend the Interstate to Laredo, Texas. The Kentucky Transportation Cabinet (KYTC) designated portions of the Pennyrile and Western Kentucky parkways, as well as the entirety of the Purchase Parkway to be integrated into the Interstate Highway System. Work began almost immediately to upgrade deficiencies in the parkways to full Interstate Highway standards, such as upgrading bridge railing, converting several interchanges into conventional diamond interchanges, and reconstructing the interchange between the Pennyrile and Western Kentucky parkways to allow for free-flowing traffic on I-69. This work was completed on the Pennyrile Parkway segment, exits were renumbered to match I-69's statewide mileage, and I-69 signs finally went up in 2013. In December 2024, the remainder of the parkway was resigned and redesignated as Interstate 169 following the completion of its upgrade to Interstate Highway standards.

== Exit list ==
County	Location	mi	km	Exit	Destinations	Notes
Christian		0.000	0.000	1	I-24 – Nashville, Paducah	I-24 exit 81; exit 1 is for I-24 west; trumpet interchange.
Christian	Hopkinsville	5.175	8.328	5	Lover's Lane – Hopkinsville	Serves James E. Bruce Convention Center, northbound exit 5A
Christian	Hopkinsville	6.000	9.656	6	US 68 Byp. – Hopkinsville	Northbound exit 5B
Christian	Hopkinsville	7.000	11.265	7	US 41 Alt. – Hopkinsville, Fort Campbell	Southern terminus until 2009
Christian	Hopkinsville	7.935	12.770	8	US 41 – Hopkinsville, Pembroke	Southern end of US 41 Truck concurrency
Christian	Hopkinsville	9.359	15.062	9	US 68 / KY 80 – Hopkinsville, Elkton	Serves Jefferson Davis Monument State Historic Site and the Hopkinsville-Christian County Airport
Christian	Hopkinsville	11.697	18.824	11	KY 1682 / US 41 Truck north – Hopkinsville	Northern end of US 41 Truck concurrency; serves Hopkinsville Community College and provides access to KY 107
Christian	Crofton	22.653	36.456	23	KY 800 – Crofton	Serves Pennyrile Forest State Resort Park
Hopkins	Nortonville	29.568	47.585	30	US 41 south	Southbound exit and northbound entrance. Northern terminus of southern portion of Pennyrile Parkway until 1994. From 1969 to 1994 the portion between exits 30 and 45 was signed as US 41 and was toll-free.
Hopkins	Nortonville	32.861	52.885	33	US 62 – Nortonville, Greenville	
Hopkins	Nortonville	34.271	55.154	34	Western Kentucky Parkway – Elizabethtown, Paducah	Western Kentucky Parkway exits 38 A/B; signed as exit 34A (east), 34B (south) & 34C (north)
Hopkins	Mortons Gap	37.070	59.658	37	KY 813 – Mortons Gap	
Hopkins	Earlington	39.794	64.042	40	KY 2171 – Earlington, Madisonville	
Hopkins	Madisonville	42.418	68.265	42	KY 70 – Madisonville, Central City	
Hopkins	Madisonville	44.337	71.353	44	US 41 Alt. / KY 281 – Madisonville, Providence	Serves Madisonville Community College
Hopkins	Madisonville	45.206	72.752	45	US 41 north – Madisonville	Northbound exit and southbound entrance. Southern terminus of northern portion of Pennyrile Parkway until 1994. From 1969 to 1994 the portion between exits 30 and 45 was signed as US 41 and was toll-free.
Hopkins	Hanson	48.979	78.824	49	KY 260 – Hanson	
Hopkins	Slaughters	54.070	87.017	54	KY 138 – Dixon, Calhoun	
Webster	Sebree	62.637	100.804	63	KY 56 – Sebree, Owensboro	
Henderson	Robards	68.363	110.020	68	KY 416	Southbound exit and northbound entrance
Henderson	Henderson	76.258	122.725	76	KY 425 west to US 60 – Morganfield	Serves Henderson Community College and the Henderson City-County Airport; south end of US 41 overlap
Henderson	Henderson	77.210	124.257	77	Audubon Parkway east – Owensboro	Western terminus of Audubon Parkway; Audubon Parkway exits 0 A/B
Henderson	Henderson	78.306	126.021	78	KY 2084 south	Southbound exit and northbound entrance
Henderson	Henderson			79	KY 351 – Zion, Henderson	End of Pennyrile Parkway designation. Highway continues as US-41 with one additional exit numbered by the Pennyrile Parkway mileage.
Henderson	Henderson			81	US 60 / US 41 Alt. south – Owensboro, Henderson, Evansville, Frankfort, Lexington, Louisville	Signed as exits 81A (east) and 81B (west/south). Highway continues north as US-41 toward Evansville, Indiana.
1.000 mi = 1.609 km; 1.000 km = 0.621 mi: Concurrency terminus; Incomplete access
