= Eastview, Kentucky =

Unincorporated community in Kentucky, United States

- Unincorporated community
- Location within Kentucky Location within the United States
- Coordinates: 37°35′20″N 86°3′21″W
- Country: United States
- State: Kentucky
- County: Hardin
- Elevation: 804 ft (245 m)
- Time zone: UTC-5 (Eastern (EST))
  - Summer (DST): UTC-4 (EST)
- ZIP codes: 42732
- Area codes: 270 & 364
- GNIS feature ID: 491522

Eastview is an unincorporated community in Hardin County, Kentucky, United States.

== Geography ==
The community is located about 13 miles (21 km) southwest of Elizabethtown, in the southwestern portion of Hardin County at the junction of U.S. Highway 62 and Kentucky Route 84. The community is also located near the Wendell H. Ford Western Kentucky Parkway at its Exit 124 interchange.
