= Interstate 69 =

Interstate Highway from Texas to Michigan

Interstate 69
- NAFTA Superhighway
- I-69 highlighted in red

Route information
- Length: 910.1 mi (1,464.7 km) Original length: 355.8 miles (572.6 km)
- Existed: August 14, 1957–present
- History: First completed in 1992
- NHS: Entire route

Section 1
- South end: US 59 in Rosenberg, TX
- Major intersections: I-10 / I-45 in Houston, TX
- North end: US 59 near Cleveland, TX

Section 2
- South end: MS 713 near Banks, MS
- Major intersections: I-55 in Hernando, MS; I-55 / I-240 in Memphis, TN; I-40 in Memphis, TN
- North end: US 51 in Memphis, TN

Section 3
- South end: US 51 in Fulton, KY
- Major intersections: US 45 in Mayfield, KY; I-24 from near Calvert City, KY to Eddyville, KY; US 62 in Calvert City, KY; US 62 / US 641 in Kuttawa, KY; US 62 in Eddyville, KY; I-169 near Nortonville, KY; US 41 in Madisonville, KY; US 41 in Henderson, KY
- North end: US 60 at Henderson, KY

Section 4
- South end: US 41 at Evansville, IN
- Major intersections: I-64 at Elberfeld, IN; I-65 / I-70 / I-74 in Indianapolis, IN; I-80 / I-90 near Angola, IN; I-94 in Marshall, MI; I-96 from Lansing, MI near Waverly, MI; I-75 / US 23 near Flint, MI; I-94 near Marysville, MI
- North end: Highway 402 at Canada–US border on Blue Water Bridge in Port Huron, MI

Location
- Country: United States
- States: Texas, Mississippi, Tennessee, Kentucky, Indiana, Michigan

Highway system
- Interstate Highway System; Main; Auxiliary; Suffixed; Business; Future

Interstate 69 (I-69) is an Interstate Highway in the United States currently consisting of eight unconnected segments. The longest segment runs from Evansville, Indiana, northeast to the Canadian border in Port Huron, Michigan, and includes the original continuous segment from Indianapolis, Indiana, to Port Huron of 355.8 miles (572.6 km). The remaining separated segments are variously completed and posted or not posted sections of an extension southwest to the Mexican border in Texas. Of this extension—nicknamed the NAFTA Superhighway because it would help trade with Canada and Mexico spurred by the North American Free Trade Agreement (NAFTA)—seven pieces in Laredo, Texas; Pharr, Texas; Brownsville, Texas; Corpus Christi, Texas; Houston, Texas; northwestern Mississippi; and Memphis, Tennessee, have been built or upgraded and signposted as I-69. Indiana completed the fifth segment that extends I-69 through that state in August 2024.

A sixth segment of I-69 through Kentucky utilizing that state's existing parkway system and a section of I-24 was established by federal legislation in 2008 with several more parkway segments being upgraded since then. This brings the total length to approximately 880 miles (1,420 km).

The proposed extension evolved from the combination of Corridors 18 and 20 of the National Highway System as designated in the Intermodal Surface Transportation Efficiency Act of 1991 (ISTEA), but the federally recognized corridor also includes connecting existing infrastructure, including I-94 between Chicago, Illinois, and Port Huron, Michigan, and several spurs from I-69. Among these proposed spurs are an extension of I-530 from Pine Bluff, Arkansas; an upgrade of U.S. Route 59 (US 59) from Texarkana, Texas being designated as Interstate 369; and a split in southern Texas (I-69E, I-69C, I-69W) to serve three border crossings at Brownsville, Pharr, and Laredo.

In August 2007, I-69 was selected by the United States Department of Transportation (USDOT) as one of six Corridors of the Future, making it eligible for additional federal funding and streamlined planning and review. This funding has since been withheld, causing some states to suspend completion of the entire route until federal funding is restored. There is no estimated timeline for completion of the entire I-69 route.

== Route description ==
I-69 currently exists as a number of distinct segments, mostly corresponding to defined sections of independent utility (SIUs):

- The original (with later additions), fully completed route from Evansville, Indiana, through Indianapolis along Interstate 465 to the Blue Water Bridge at Port Huron, Michigan (SIU 1-3);
- The upgraded portions of the Kentucky Parkway System: Purchase, Western Kentucky, and Pennyrile parkways; in addition to a portion of I-24 (SIU 5) and (SIU 6);
- A 42-mile (68 km) section from Tunica Resorts, Mississippi, to the I-40/I-69/State Route 300 (SR 300) interchange in Memphis, Tennessee, part of (SIU 9) and (SIU 10);
- The existing US 59 freeway from Rosenberg, Texas, to Cleveland, Texas, (SIU 19);
- A 24.106-mile (38.795 km) segment of US 77 from Kingsville, Texas to I-37 near Corpus Christi, Texas, designated as I-69 in August 2011 and redesignated as I-69E on May 30, 2013, (SIU 22);
- An 18-mile (29 km) section of US 281 from I-2/US 83 in Pharr, Texas, to Edinburg, Texas, designated as I-69C on May 30, 2013;
- A 58.9-mile (94.8 km) section of US 77 from the Veterans International Bridge at Brownsville, Texas, to north of Raymondville, Texas, designated as I-69E on May 30, 2013, (SIU 23); and
- A 1.4-mile (2.3 km) section of both US 59 and State Highway Loop 20 (Loop 20) in Laredo, Texas, between the World Trade International Bridge and I-35/US 83, designated as I-69W on June 17, 2014.

Lengths
	mi	km
TX	82.700	133.093
LA		
AR		
MS	21.393	34.429
TN	21.000	33.796
KY	148.090	238.328
IN	341.824	550.112
MI	202.317	325.598
Total	817.324	1,315.355

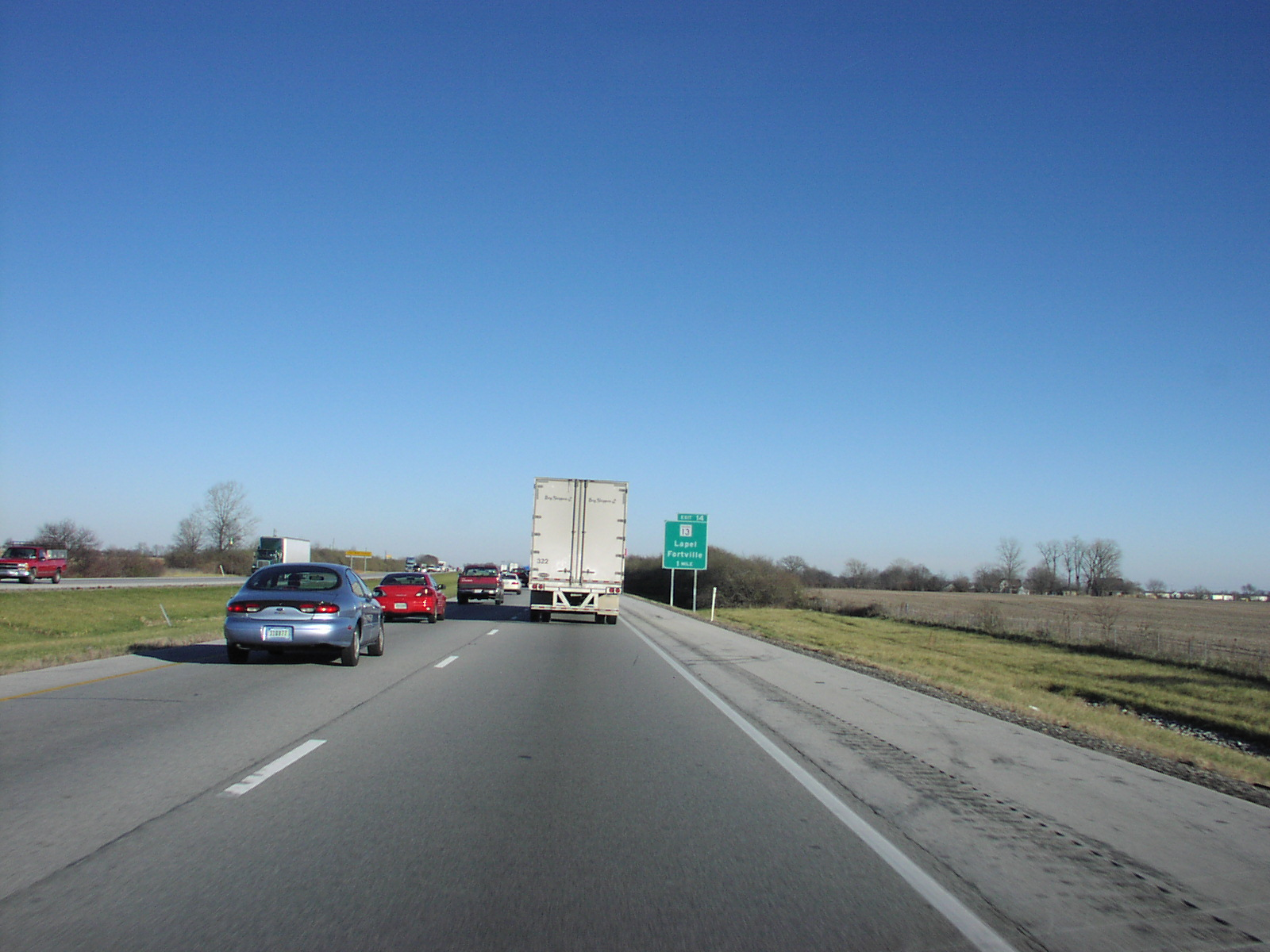
Looking on I-69 just outside Indianapolis near Pendleton; the exit in the picture has since been renumbered to 214

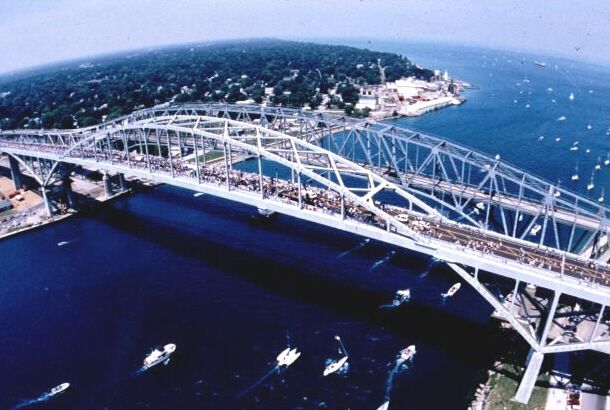
I-69/I-94's northern terminus at the Blue Water Bridge at the Canadian border in Port Huron, Michigan, connecting it to Highway 402 in Point Edward, Ontario

=== Texas ===
In Texas, I-69 currently begins in Rosenberg then passing through Greater Houston before currently ending in Cleveland, Texas. I-69, when completed, will be concurrent with US 59 from Victoria to Tenaha. Various portions of US 59 are being upgraded to prepare for the future alignment.

=== Mississippi ===
Another section of I-69 starts at an at-grade intersection with the route of Mississippi Highway 304 (MS 304) in Banks, Tunica County, Mississippi. It continues roughly north-northeast, crossing into DeSoto County to a partial interchange with the current route of MS 304, then runs easterly to an interchange with I-55 in northern Hernando. It then continues north, overlapping I-55 to the Tennessee state line, and continues northward concurrently with I-55 to the south side of Memphis. It then follows I-240 northward through downtown before joining I-40. Presently, the northern end of this section of I-69 is at the I-40/I-69/SR 300 interchange on the north side of Memphis. This portion of the route was the first SIU of the proposed extension to be signed as part of the national I-69 route, and the first portion designed as part of the extension.

=== Kentucky ===
In Kentucky, I-69 begins at the Tennessee border in Fulton on US 51 then follows the existing route of Purchase Parkway, I-24 (from exit 52 to 42), Western Kentucky Parkway, and Pennyrile Parkway before ending at US 41 just south of Henderson.

=== Indiana ===
The new section of I-69 in southern Indiana presently begins at the US 41 interchange south of Evansville at the former southern terminus of I-164. From there, it runs first east, then north, meeting SR 662, SR 66, and SR 62. At exit 18, SR 57 joins I-69 on a concurrency. Shortly thereafter, it meets I-64 at a cloverleaf interchange. From there, it runs north to SR 68. Construction was completed on November 19, 2012, on a 67-mile (108 km) segment (SIU 3, Sections 1–3). This extension takes the route north-northeast from there to SR 64 near Oakland City, then north-northeast to US 50/US 150 at Washington, and finally northeast to US 231 near Naval Surface Warfare Center Crane Division (NSWC Crane Division). Construction for the final new terrain segment (SIU 3, Section 4), which takes I-69 from NSWC Crane Division northeast to SR 37 on the southwest side of Bloomington, was completed in December 2015 and was extended north to Martinsville in late 2018 (Section 5). Section 6 (Martinsville to Indianapolis) of I-69's SIU 3 was upgraded to full Interstate Highway standards all the way north-northeast to I-465 on the southwest side of Indianapolis in the I-69 Finish Line Project. I-69 became a continuous segment in Indiana with the opening of the I-69/I-465 interchange on the south side of Indianapolis in August 2024.

The original portion of I-69 in Indiana (SIU 1 of the overall national plan) starts at an interchange with I-465, the beltway around Indianapolis on the northeast side of that city. I-69 heads northeast to near Anderson, where it turns more easterly to provide indirect access to Muncie before turning more northerly toward Marion and Fort Wayne. In Fort Wayne, I-69 runs along the western edge of the city while I-69's first (and for many years only) signed auxiliary route, I-469, loops east of the city. After crossing the Indiana East–West Toll Road (I-80/I-90) near Angola and Fremont, I-69 enters Michigan just south of Kinderhook.

=== Michigan ===
I-69 in Michigan runs north passing through Coldwater and Marshall. There, it crosses I-94 east of Battle Creek. Near Olivet, I-69 begins to turn in a northeasterly direction, passing through the Lansing–East Lansing metropolitan area. Here, I-69 is cosigned with I-96 as an overlap west of Lansing, the only such palindromic pairing in the Interstate Highway System. Where it splits from I-96, I-69 turns east, both in compass direction and in signed direction, and heads north of Lansing and through Flint (where it crosses I-75) to a junction with I-94 just outside Port Huron. At its eastern terminus, I-69 joins I-94 to the Blue Water Bridge across the St. Clair River, where traffic continues on Highway 402 in the Canadian province of Ontario to London, Ontario.

== History ==
=== Original route ===
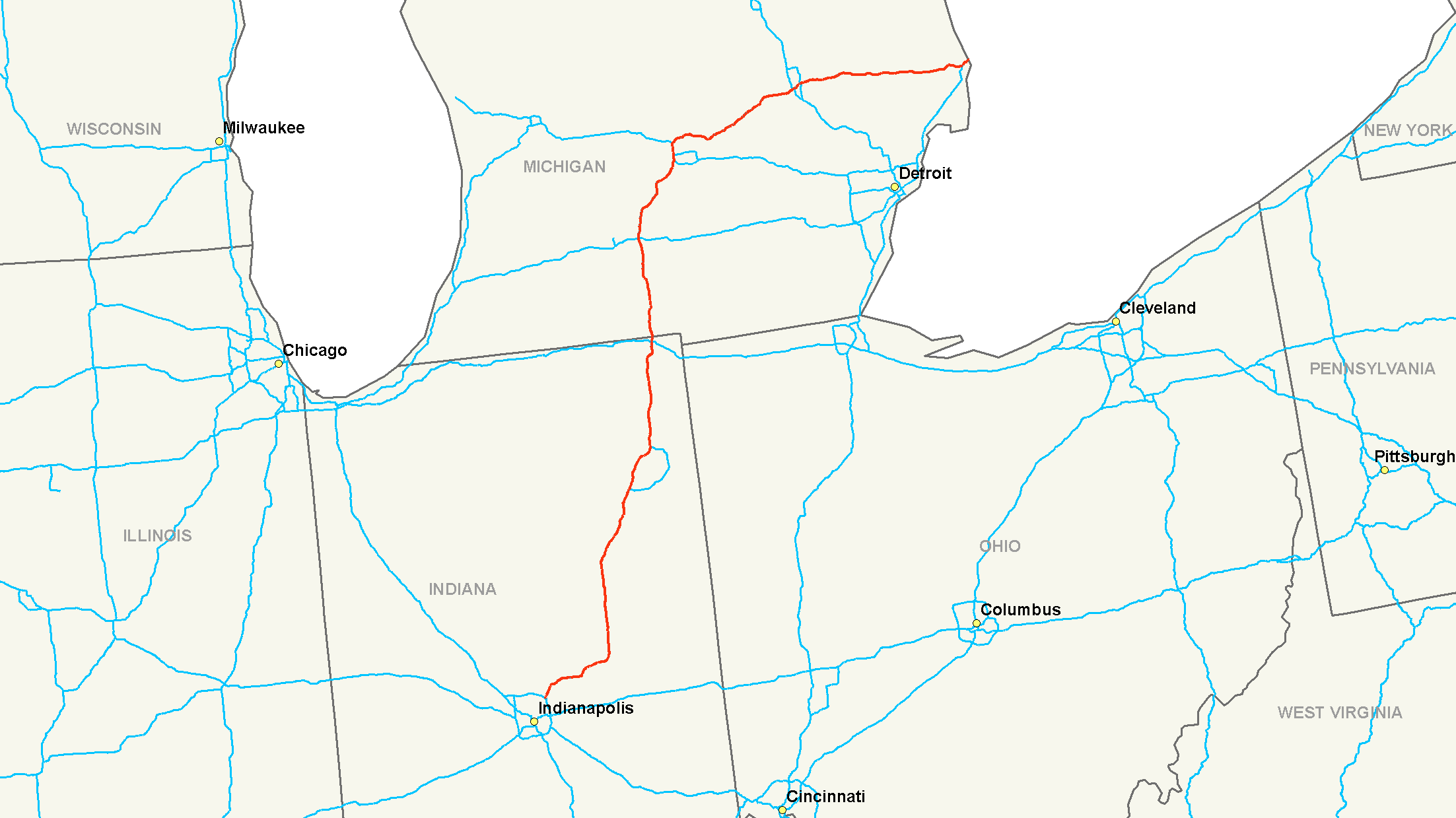
Map of the original I-69 route

A route from I-465 in Indianapolis northeast via Fort Wayne to I-80/I-90 near Angola was added to the proposed "Interregional Highway System" by the early 1940s. Unlike most of the routes, it was not drawn along an existing U.S. Route corridor, except north of Fort Wayne (where it used US 27); most of it ran roughly parallel to SR 9 and SR 37. The extension beyond Angola to I-94 near Marshall, Michigan, actually started out as part of what evolved into I-94. On early plans, the Chicago–Detroit route would have replaced US 112 (now US 12), splitting from I-80/I-90 at South Bend. By 1947, the route had been shifted north to present I-94, along what was then US 12, but the connection to South Bend remained, splitting at Kalamazoo.

The I-69 designation was assigned to the Indianapolis–Angola route in 1957, while the short South Bend–Kalamazoo route became proposed I-67. The I-67 designation was shifted east to the US 27 corridor by early 1958, eventually being absorbed into the extension of I-69 to I-94 near Marshall which was built in 1967. The Federal-Aid Highway Act of 1968 authorized an additional 1,500 miles (2,400 km) of Interstates to be chosen by the FHWA; among Michigan's proposals was a 156-mile (251 km) extension of I-69 northeast and east via US 27 to Lansing, M-78 to Flint, and M-21 to Port Huron. However, the FHWA initially only approved the route to I-475 in Flint. The continuation to Port Huron was eventually approved in February 1987. Michigan's 1,241-mile (1,997 km) portion of the Interstate Highway System was completed in 1992, when the last piece of I-69 opened southwest of Lansing between I-96 and Charlotte.

=== Extended route ===
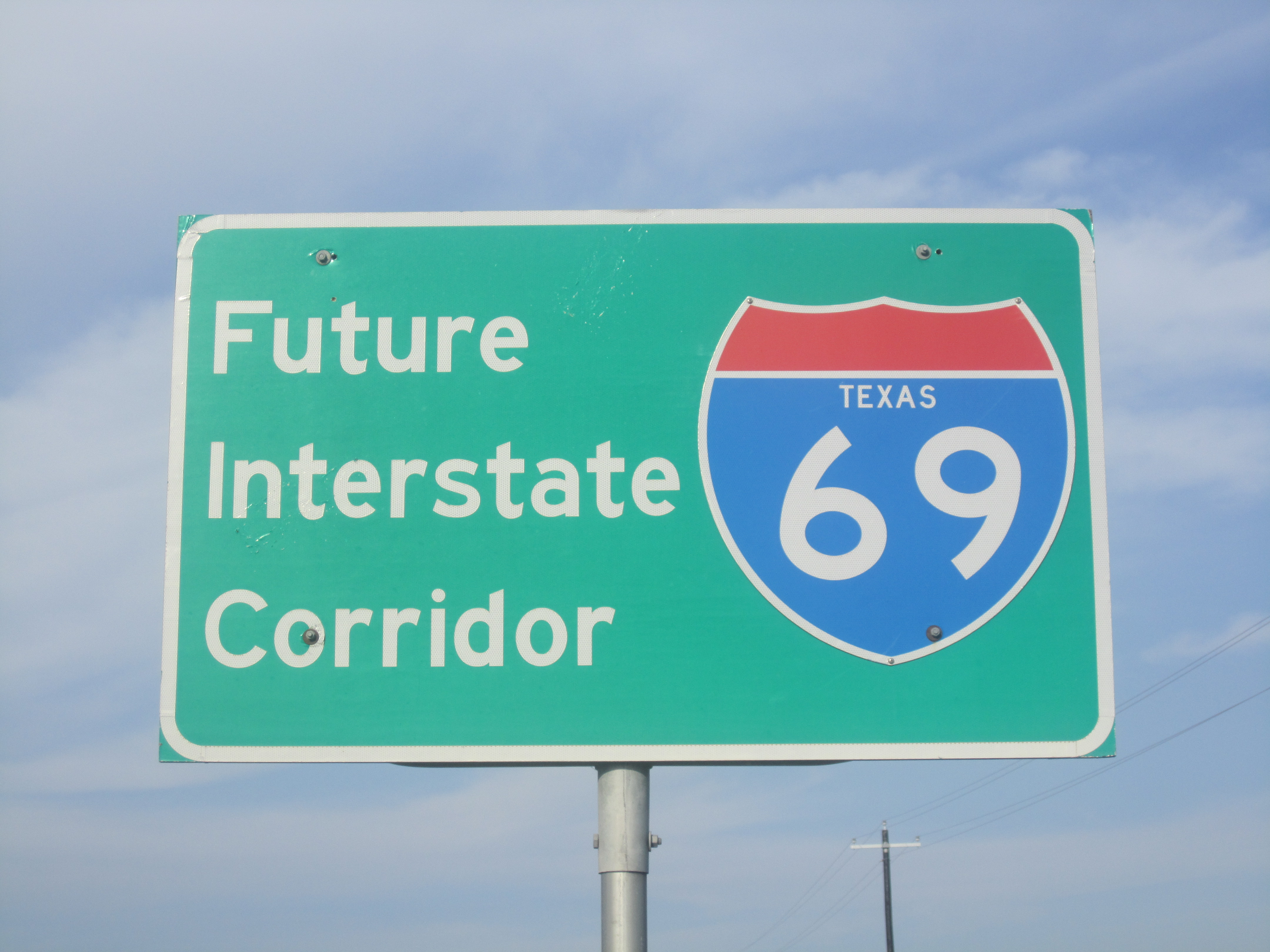
The current US 59 will become I-69W; picture taken east of Laredo, Texas

Intermodal Surface Transportation Efficiency Act (ISTEA) of 1991 included two High Priority Corridors that would later become parts of a proposed crosscountry extension of I-69:

- (18) Corridor from Indianapolis, to Memphis, Tennessee, via Evansville, Indiana.
- (20) US 59 Corridor from the Mexican border in Laredo, Texas, through Houston, to the vicinity of Texarkana, Texas.

Corridor 18 was extended southwest to Houston, where it connected to Corridor 20, by the Department of Transportation and Related Agencies Appropriations Act, 1993; the new definition read "Corridor from Indianapolis, Indiana, through Evansville, Indiana, Memphis, Tennessee, Shreveport/Bossier, Louisiana, and to Houston, Texas." The National Highway System Designation Act of 1995 made further amendments to the description of Corridor 18, specifying that it would serve Mississippi and Arkansas, extending it south to the Mexican border in the Lower Rio Grande Valley and adding a short connection at Brownsville, Texas. This act also specified that Corridors 18 and 20 were "future parts of the Interstate System" to become actual Interstates when built to Interstate Highway standards and connected to other Interstates. Although the act designated Corridor 9 as I-99, no number was assigned to Corridors 18 and 20 yet.

The Transportation Equity Act for the 21st Century (TEA-21), enacted in 1998, greatly expanded the definition of Corridor 18 to include the existing I-69, as well as I-94 between Port Huron, Michigan, and Chicago. A connection to Pine Bluff, Arkansas, was added, and the extension to the Lower Rio Grande Valley was detailed as splitting into two routes just south of Victoria, one following US 77 and the other following US 59 and US 281 to the Rio Grande. This act also assigned the I-69 designation to Corridors 18 and 20, with the branches on US 77, US 281, and US 59 to the Rio Grande being "Interstate 69 East", "Interstate 69 Central", and "Interstate 69 West", respectively. With TEA-21, the I-69 extension took shape and remains today as those segments.

In 2000, Corridors 18 and 20 were split into 32 SIUs as part of the I-69 (Corridor 18) Special Environmental Study. In Texas, it was originally envisioned that private firms will build, operate, then transfer portions of the highway to the state after a specified period of time. Lawmakers in Kentucky once considered a bill that would authorize the re-tolling of three parkways slated to become part of I-69.

==== Opposition and controversy ====
The construction of the I-69 extension beyond Indianapolis has angered a variety of interests, particularly environmentalists. The southern portion of the route in Indiana would run through wetlands, existing farmland, and forested areas, and cut through geologically sensitive karst topography, which environmentalists argue threatens to pollute underground water systems and harm the rare species that live there. Fiscal conservatives also oppose completion of I-69, arguing that federal legislation establishing the I-69 corridor amounts to an unfunded mandate imposed by the federal government upon the states through which the highway will travel, as the legislation requires states to pursue construction of their portions of I-69 but provides no funding mechanism to cover its estimated $25-billion cost, thereby leaving cash-strapped states to figure out how to finance its construction. Three states (Louisiana, Mississippi, and Tennessee) have publicly stated they will not build their sections of I-69 until Congress appropriates funds to complete environmental studies, design, and construction in each state.

== Planned and delayed extensions ==
=== Past progress ===

On June 6, 2008, President George W. Bush signed HR 1195, designating the Purchase Parkway as Future I-69. Kentucky officials planned to place I-69 signs on the Pennyrile Parkway, Western Kentucky Parkway, and Purchase Parkway in 2008, but the Federal Highway Administration (FHWA) had not yet given Kentucky approval to do so for the entire route. Kentucky was making spot improvements to its parkways to bring them up to Interstate Highway standards in anticipation of the I-69 designation.

Meanwhile, Indiana examined building most of SIU 3 as a toll road but quickly reverted to making it toll-free in 2006 with an announcement to that effect by Indiana Governor Mitch Daniels after widespread opposition from I-69 opponents and supporters alike. Indiana had been using funds from the $3.8-billion Indiana Toll Road lease deal along with public–private partnerships to construct SIU 3 between Indianapolis and Evansville. The segment from Indianapolis to Evansville, Indiana, opened as of August 10, 2024.

=== Progress delays ===
While federal legislation established a mandate to extend I-69 from Indiana to Texas, it did not provide funding for its construction. I-69 construction must compete against other projects for traditional funding. Despite the approval of several segments, work has been completed on only a few scattered segments due in part to increasing costs for construction materials and machinery. As a result, several states have indicated that construction of I-69 may not be possible without the use of tolls as the primary means to finance building the highway. Tennessee, Arkansas, and Mississippi passed legislation authorizing toll roads within each state but have not applied tolling to their sections of I-69 due to the widespread unpopularity of toll roads in these states. A bridge over the Ohio River, which was to have been built along I-69 to connect Indiana with Kentucky, stalled in 2004 because each state did not have enough funding for it. In 2016, both states reached an agreement to restart environmental studies and develop a funding strategy for the Ohio River crossing; more funding has allowed for design and construction work to begin since that time. Tennessee has suspended work on I-69 indefinitely due to a lack of funding to build the highway outside of the Memphis metropolitan area. Arkansas has halted work on its mainline portion of I-69, aside from the Monticello Bypass, although it has applied for a federal grant to complete design and construction for the 25-mile (40 km) section between Monticello and McGehee. Phase 1 started construction in December 2022. As of 2023, no portion of I-69 in Louisiana has been built nor has any construction started.

=== Current progress and plans ===
Texas, Kentucky, and Indiana have been slowly advancing construction of I-69 within each state through traditional funding sources when available and innovative financing methods, such as public–private partnerships. In December 2018, the I-69 River Crossing project team for Kentucky and Indiana announced a preferred plan to build a new toll bridge across the Ohio River as part of I-69. In January 2023, contracts were awarded for work on the Kentucky approach to the new bridge (section 1). In March 2023, Kentucky and Indiana signed an initial memorandum of agreement to allow preliminary development and financial planning to move forward. The Indiana approach (section 3) began construction in summer of 2024 with the widening and increasing of support for the inside shoulders to serve as temporary travel lanes on the final 1.5 mile stretch of I-69 eastward from its temporary end at the US 41 interchange. Construction of the bridge (section 2) is currently scheduled to begin in 2027 and be completed in 2031, although efforts to speed up the timeframe are being explored.

In 2021, Tennessee announced it was reviving construction of segment 7 of I-69 in northwestern Tennessee to link it to I-55 on the west side of the Mississippi River. This will provide an interim direct freeway link to Memphis that will bypass the suspended segment 8 pending its eventual completion to take I-69 even more directly into Memphis. The Tennessee Department of Transportation (TDOT) halted the Interstate work about four years earlier because they lacked federal funding for the project. The revived portion of I-69 will run from the Kentucky state line to Dyersburg where it will connect with I-155, a spur that crosses the Mississippi River and extends to I-55 in southeastern Missouri. From there, I-55 extends south running parallel to the Mississippi River on the Missouri–Arkansas side then crosses the river into Memphis. A bypass around Union City, Tennessee has been completed to open to traffic on February 21, 2024.

=== Texas ===
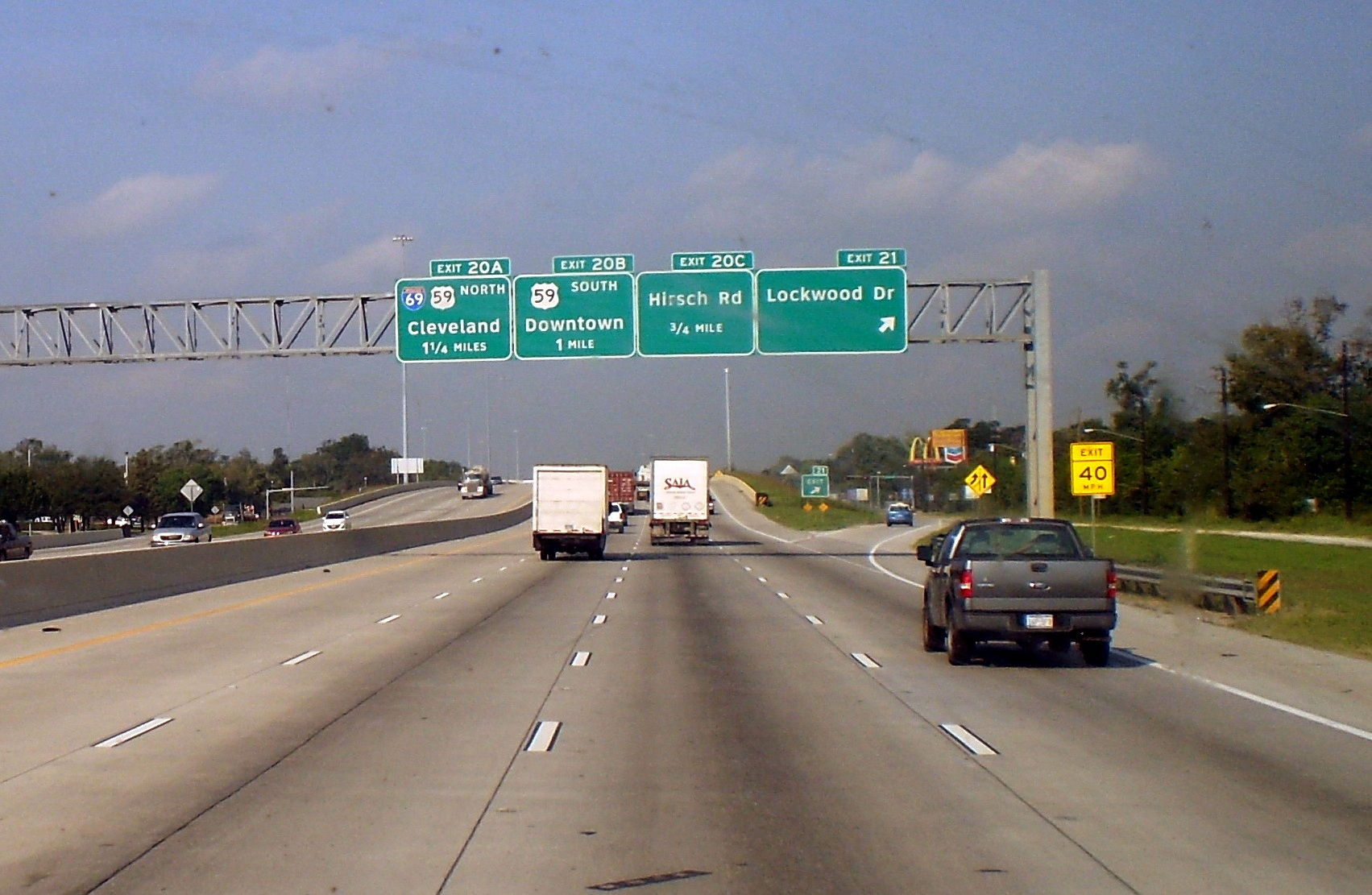
Upcoming connection from I-610, the North Loop to I-69 in Houston

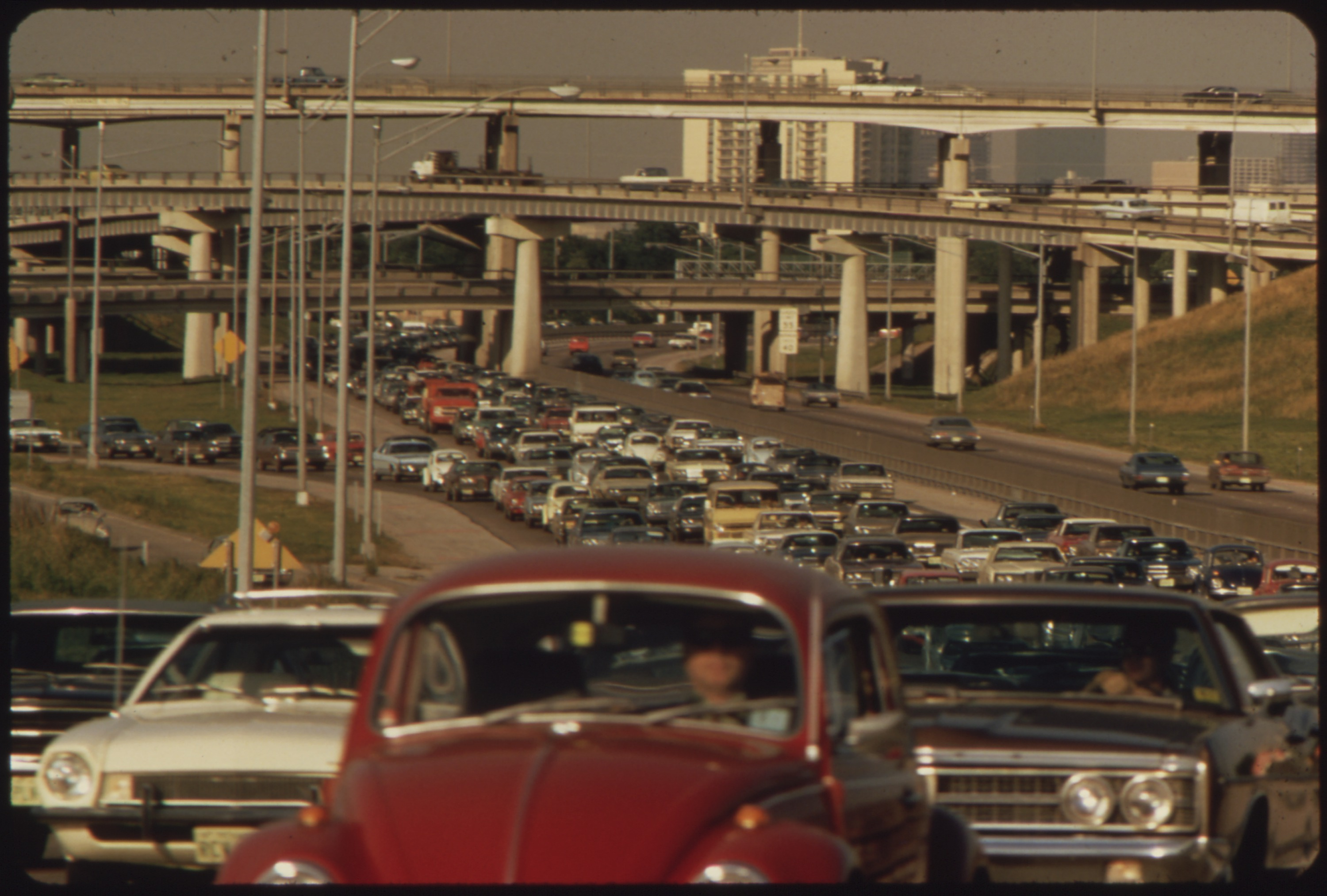
I-69 in Houston in 1972, back when it was known as the Southwest Freeway

In Texas, I-69 planning has become part of the Trans-Texas Corridor (TTC) studies. This part of the TTC, called I-69/TTC, includes I-69 and all of its spurs authorized by Congress. It will extend from three border crossings, at Laredo, Pharr, and Brownsville, along US 59, US 281, and US 77 toward Victoria. After the three branches join, I-69 will continue along the general US 59 corridor through Houston to Tenaha, where it will turn easterly to Louisiana along US 84. In Greater Houston, I-69 will follow the US 59 freeway corridor through town. A branch (I-369) continues north on US 59 from Tenaha to Texarkana, where it will eventually connect to I-30 and I-49. Most of the proposed I-69 route in Texas already exists as four-lane highways, with a lengthy freeway section stretching north and south of Houston along US 59 and shorter freeway sections of US 77, US 83, and US 281 in the Lower Rio Grande Valley.

The I-69/TTC project has been split into 15 SIUs, which match the original ones but do not share numbers. SIUs 1 to 8 (original 16 to 23) cover the mainline along the "Interstate 69 East" branch to the Mexican border at Brownsville. The "Interstate 69 Central" branch to Pharr is SIUs 9, 11, and 12 (original 24 to 26). The "Interstate 369" and "Interstate 69 West" branches to Texarkana and the Mexican border at Laredo, respectively, are SIUs 13 and 14 (original 29 and 30), and two connections to Brownsville and Pharr are SIUs 10 and 15 (original 31 and 32). The I-69/TTC study also includes SIU L-CC, a connection between Freer and Corpus Christi that was not in the 2000 study. The Texas Department of Transportation (TxDOT) originally considered building the I-69/TTC over new terrain paralleling US 59, US 77, and US 281.

Responding to widespread opposition from environmental groups, property rights activists and others, TxDOT announced in June 2008 that it will complete I-69 by rebuilding the existing US 59, US 77, and US 281 roadways to Interstate standards through rural areas, with bypasses around urban centers along the route. Instead of building the Trans-Texas Corridor as originally planned, TxDOT now plans to finance upgrading the existing highways to I-69 through private sector investment. Under the proposed arrangement, I-69 would remain toll-free where it overlaps preexisting highways, while bypasses of cities may be tolled. The private firms awarded contracts for I-69 would also build and operate toll roads throughout the state; some of those revenues would then be applied to I-69 construction.

A stated goal of TxDOT's I-69 initiative is that "existing suitable freeway sections of the proposed system be designated as I-69 as soon as possible". In response to TxDOT's request, a six-mile (9.7 km) segment of US 77 between I-37 and SH 44 near Corpus Christi was approved for the "I-69" designation by the FHWA in August 2011 and was approved by the American Association of State Highway and Transportation Officials (AASHTO) in October 2011; signage was posted at an official ceremony on December 5, 2011; it was resigned as I-69E on May 29, 2013.

At the May 18, 2012, meeting of AASHTO, 35 miles (56 km) of US 59 from I-610 in Houston to Fostoria Road in Liberty County were also approved as ready for I-69 signage.

On May 29, 2013, the Texas Transportation Commission gave approval to naming completed Interstate-standard segments of US 77 and US 281 as I-69. US 77 through Cameron and Willacy counties will be signed as I-69E, including 52 miles (84 km) of existing freeway starting at the Rio Grande in Brownsville and running north past Raymondville. The 13 miles (21 km) of US 281 freeway in Pharr and Edinburg will be signed as I-69C.

The section of US 59 inside the I-610 loop that runs through Downtown Houston was approved by the FHWA for designation as I-69 on March 9, 2015, and approved for signage as such by the Texas Transportation Commission on March 24, 2015.

=== Louisiana, Arkansas, and Mississippi ===
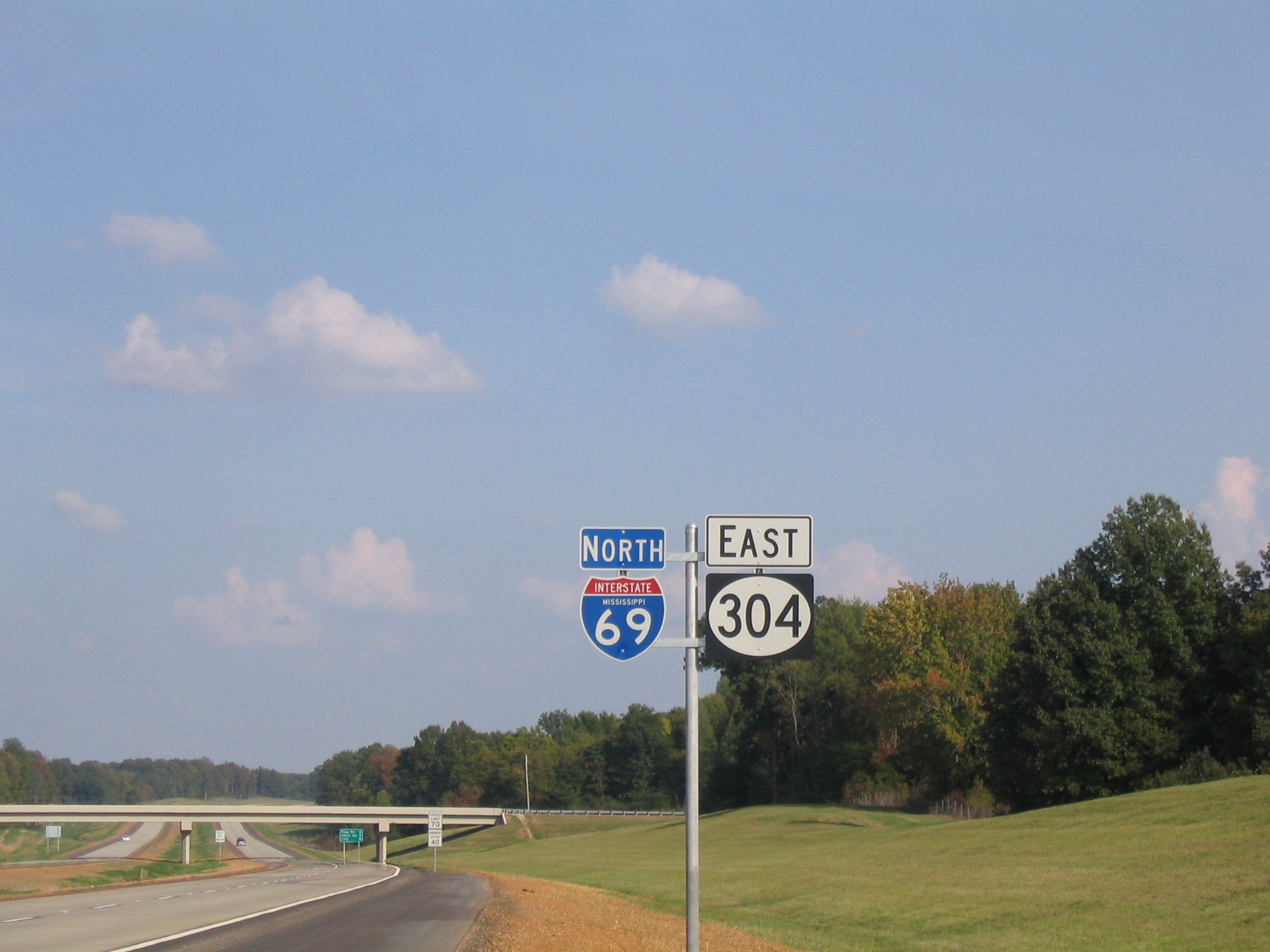
A stretch of I-69 cosigned with MS 304 in Mississippi

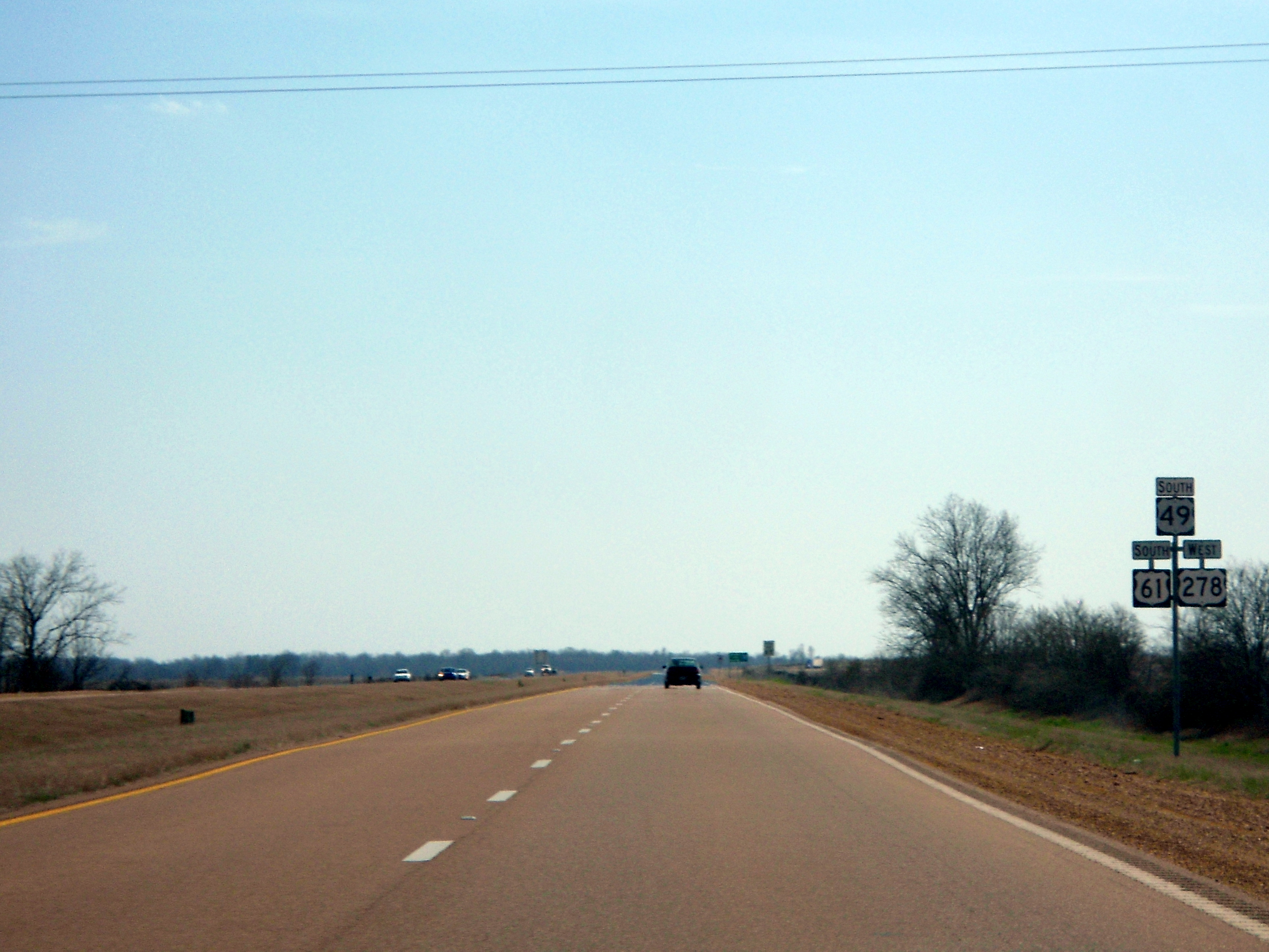
Future I-69 along with US 49, US 61, and US 278 near Clarksdale, Mississippi

The nearly 350-mile (560 km) portion of the I-69 extension from south of Clarksdale, Mississippi, to the Louisiana–Texas state line is planned to be built as a new-terrain route that parallels existing U.S. Routes and state highways in some locations. As well as covering the part in Texas northeast of Nacogdoches, SIU 16 also extends into Louisiana, ending at US 171 near Stonewall. SIU 15 continues around the south and east sides of the Shreveport area, crossing I-49 and ending at I-20 near Haughton. SIU 14 extends northeast from I-20 to US 82 near El Dorado, Arkansas, and SIU 13 continues northeast to US 65 near McGehee, mainly paralleling US 278. Also included in Corridor 18, as SIU 28, is an extension of I-530 from Pine Bluff south along the US 425 corridor to I-69 west of Monticello; a short piece at the south end opened in mid-2006 as Highway 530 (AR 530). Another segment of AR 530 opened in 2013 and another in 2015. The only section of Future I-69 that is currently open to traffic is the 8.5-mile (13.7 km) eastern leg of the Monticello Bypass. This section of the Monticello Bypass is currently two lanes and signed as US Highway 278 Bypass (US 278 Byp.). Another two-lane segment to McGehee started construction in late 2022. The Charles W. Dean Bridge, SIU 12, is planned to cross the Mississippi River between McGehee, Arkansas, and Benoit, Mississippi, while SIU 11 will parallel US 61 to Tunica Resorts. SIU 10, the first completed portion of the I-69 extension, runs east from Tunica Resorts to I-55 near Hernando and opened in late 2006. With the record of decision signed in 2007, the FHWA authorized the Mississippi Department of Transportation (MDOT) to add I-69 signs on I-55 from the I-55/I-69 interchange in Hernando to the Tennessee state line.

=== Tennessee, Kentucky, and Southern Indiana ===
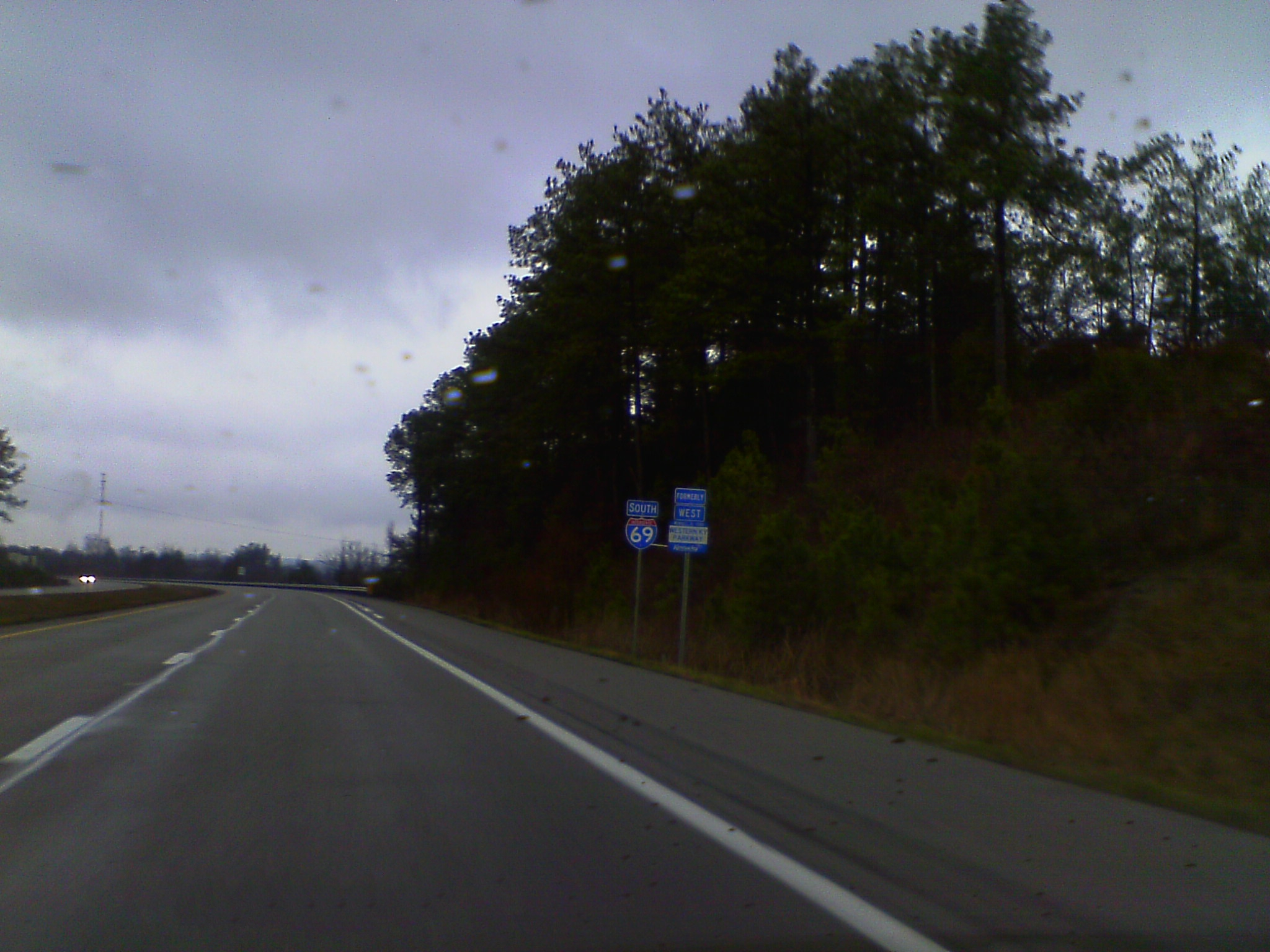
I-69 cosigned with Western Kentucky Parkway near Dawson Springs, Kentucky

From a point south of Clarksdale, Mississippi, to Henderson, Kentucky, most of the I-69 alignment is planned to consist of upgrades to existing U.S. Highways, Interstates and substandard freeways, although some sections are expected be built as bypasses around cities and towns along the route.

I-69 SIU 9 overlaps I-55 into Memphis, Tennessee, switching there to I-240 and then I-40 before leaving onto the short SR 300 connection and then paralleling US 51 to near Millington. On January 18, 2008, the FHWA authorized TDOT to erect I-69 signs on I-55, I-240, and I-40 from the Mississippi state line to the I-40/SR 300 interchange. The recently completed I-269 will bypass this part of I-69, beginning where I-69 joins I-55 in Mississippi and ending near Millington, and will include the northern part of SR 385 near Millington. SIU 8 is planned to continue beyond Millington, near US 51, to I-155 near Dyersburg. Despite these plans, it is unclear if the entire I-69 project in Tennessee will ever be completed. The state has suspended work indefinitely on the 65-mile (105 km) SIU 8 and the remaining nine-mile (14 km) unbuilt portion of SIU 9 between SR 300 and the northern end of I-269 near Millington due to a lack of federal funding. Work on SIU 7 was also suspended for a few years, but this project has now been revived by the state which has decided there's value in having a continuous chain of freeways running partly on other completed Interstates between Memphis and the Kentucky state line. SIU 7 follows the existing US 51 freeway with new bypasses to the state line at Fulton, Kentucky. Completion of this stretch of I-69 where it bypasses Union City opens to traffic temporarily signed as State Route 690 on February 21, 2024. A bypass for Troy is proposed as well. After that, Tennessee–Missouri–Arkansas I-55 link to I-155 which crosses back across the Mississippi River to the newly completed I-69 will serve as the main freeway routes between Memphis and northwestern Tennessee, at least on an interim basis.

In Kentucky, I-69 mostly follows existing freeways originally built as toll roads. SIU 6 follows the Julian M. Carroll Purchase Parkway and I-24 from Fulton to Eddyville, while SIU 5 continues along the Wendell H. Ford Western Kentucky Parkway and the Edward T. Breathitt Pennyrile Parkway from Eddyville to Henderson. While these parkways received the I-69 designation by federal legislation signed in 2008, upgrades have been necessary to bring the freeways to Interstate standards—but required less work compared to other states where entirely new highway must be built. A number of construction contracts have been let by the state of Kentucky to reconfigure several interchanges along the parkways. Many of these interchanges were originally designed with opposing loop ramps to accommodate toll barriers at the interchanges; these "tollbooth" style interchanges were (or will be) reconfigured to standard diamond interchanges as part of the parkways' conversion to I-69.

On August 31, 2011, Kentucky Governor Steve Beshear announced an agreement between the state and the FHWA which allowed the Kentucky Transportation Cabinet (KYTC) to erect I-69 signage along the new Interstate's 17-mile (27 km) overlap with I-24 and the 38-mile (61 km) stretch of the Western Kentucky Parkway between I-24 and the Pennyrile Parkway. Signage was placed in late 2011, with construction on necessary upgrades of the portion of the Western Kentucky Parkway expected to be bid in September. On October 25, 2011, I-69 was officially designated by Beshear along a 55-mile (89 km) stretch of I-24 and the Western Kentucky Parkway between Calvert City and Nortonville. Signage and milemarkers were replaced on the 38-mile (61 km) stretch of the Western Kentucky Parkway in mid-December 2012. An additional 43.6 miles (70.2 km) along the Pennyrile Parkway from the Western Kentucky Parkway to Kentucky Route 425 (KY 425), south of Henderson, was designated and resigned on November 16, 2015. The Purchase Parkway between Mayfield and Calvert City was signed in July 2018. The next phase of upgrading Purchase Parkway from Mayfield to the Tennessee state line began in December 2022 and was completed and opened on December 15, 2024.

A bridge known as Ohio River Crossing (ORX) spanning the Ohio River is the last remaining piece to connect the two states. The Indiana and Kentucky governors agreed on June 30, 2016, to spend a combined $17 million (equivalent to $22.3 million in 2025) for an environmental and design study to determine how the two states will pay for it. The first study was commissioned in 2001, and a preliminary report in 2004 put the cost of a bridge at $1.4 billion (equivalent to $2.28 billion in 2025). In August 2023, officials in Kentucky and Indiana submitted a grant proposal to the U.S. Department of Transportation requesting $630 million to build. Construction began on I-69 ORX Section 1 in Kentucky in 2023. It includes numerous roadway and bridge improvements. Nine new bridges are being built and seven bridges are being rehabilitated as part of the new I-69 in Henderson. This section is scheduled for completion in 2025. Construction began on I-69 ORX Section 3 in Indiana in summer 2024 with the widening and strengthening of shoulders along I-69 east of its current end at US 41 to hold traffic during construction. ORX Section 2 is the actual construction of the bridge and it will be supported by toll revenue supplemented by traditional federal and state dollars. A financial plan was developed in 2021. The bridge is expected to begin construction in 2027 and will be completed in 2031. Both states are looking for opportunities to accelerate the timeline. When the Ohio River Crossing is complete, roughly 2.5 miles (4.0 km) east of US 41, the remainder of the former spur may become an extension of Veterans Memorial Parkway.

At the October 18, 2013, AASHTO meeting, an Indiana Department of Transportation (INDOT) request to redesignate I-164 as part of I-69 was approved, pending concurrence from the FHWA. I-69 was officially designated on this corridor in late 2014.

SIU 3, connecting I-69 to I-465 in southern Indianapolis, roughly parallels SR 57 and SR 45 and uses an upgraded version of the existing SR 37 from just south of Bloomington to a point just south of Indianapolis. A 67-mile (108 km) stretch from Evansville to NSWC Crane Division was completed on November 19, 2012, and the remaining 27-mile (43 km) portion to Bloomington opened to traffic on December 9, 2015. Construction on upgrading a 21-mile (34 km) section of SR 37 from Bloomington to just south of Martinsville to Interstate standards was completed in late 2018. Construction began in 2019 on the final segment from Martinsville to Indianapolis, a project known as I-69 Finish Line, and completed by the end of 2024. SIU 2 will follow the southeastern quarter of I-465 around the city. The interchange between I-69 and I-465 on the southwest side of Indianapolis opened on August 6 and 9, 2024, making I-69 through Indiana continuous.

== Junction list ==
Texas
Gap in route
US 59 in Rosenberg. The highways travel concurrently to north-northeast of Cleveland.
I-610 in Houston
I-45 in Houston
I-10 / US 90 in Houston
I-610 in Houston
Gap in route
Mississippi
MS 713 east-northeast of Robinsonville. The highways travel concurrently for approximately 3.73 miles (6.00 km).
I-55 in Hernando. The highways travel concurrently to Memphis, Tennessee.
Tennessee
US 51 in Memphis
I-55 / I-240 in Memphis. I-69/I-240 travels concurrently through Memphis.
US 78 in Memphis
US 51 / US 64 / US 70 / US 79 in Memphis
I-40 / I-240 in Memphis. I-40/I-69 travels concurrently through Memphis.
US 51 in Memphis
Gap in route
Kentucky
US 51 in Fulton. I-69/US 51 travel concurrently through Fulton.
US 45 in Mayfield
I-24 south of Calvert City. The highways travel concurrently to Eddyville.
US 62 in Calvert City
US 62 / US 641 in Kuttawa
US 62 in Eddyville
I-169 / Future I-569 north-northeast of Nortonville
US 41 in Madisonville
US 41 near Henderson
Gap in route; planned to be filled in by the I-69 Ohio River Crossing.
Indiana
US 41 in Evansville
I-64 west-northwest of Elberfeld
US 50 / US 150 east of Washington
US 231 west-northwest of Scotland
SR 37 southwest of Bloomington. The highways run concurrently past Indianapolis.
I-465 / I-74 / US 31 / US 36 / US 40 in Indianapolis. I-69/I-465/I-74 travels concurrently around the east and south sides of Indianapolis.
I-65 in Indianapolis
I-74 / US 421 in Indianapolis
I-70 in Indianapolis
I-465 / US 421 / US 31 / US 52 in Indianapolis
US 35 east-northeast of Alexandria. The highways travel concurrently to Gas City.
US 224 in Markle
I-469 / US 33 east of Roanoke. I-69/US 33 travels concurrently to Fort Wayne.
US 24 in Fort Wayne. The highways travel concurrently through Fort Wayne.
US 30 / US 33 in Fort Wayne. I-69/US 30 travels concurrently through Fort Wayne.
US 27 in Fort Wayne
I-469 / US 24 / US 30 in Fort Wayne
US 6 west-northwest of Waterloo
US 20 west of Angola
I-80 / I-90 west-northwest of Fremont
Michigan
US 12 in Coldwater
I-94 northwest of Marshall
I-96 in Lansing. The highways travel concurrently to northwest of Waverly.
I-496 west of Lansing
US 127 north-northwest of East Lansing
I-75 / US 23 southwest of Flint
I-475 in Flint
I-94 north of Marysville. The highways travel concurrently to the Canada–United States border in Port Huron.
Highway 402 east at the Canada–United States border in Port Huron.

== Auxiliary routes ==
- Interstate 69C (Texas)
- Interstate 69E (Texas)
- Interstate 69W (Texas)
- Interstate 69 Spur (Kentucky)—proposed
- Interstate 169 (Kentucky)
- Interstate 169 (Tennessee)—former proposed
- Interstate 169 (Texas)
- Interstate 269 (Indiana)—proposed/rejected
- Interstate 269 (Mississippi–Tennessee)
- Interstate 369 (Texas)
- Interstate 469 (Indiana)
- Interstate 569 (Kentucky)—proposed
