= Robards, Kentucky =

- City
- Location of Robards in Henderson County, Kentucky.
- Coordinates: 37°40′29″N 87°32′35″W
- Country: United States
- State: Kentucky
- County: Henderson

Area
  - Total: 3.04 sq mi (7.88 km^{2})
  - Land: 3.03 sq mi (7.84 km^{2})
  - Water: 0.015 sq mi (0.04 km^{2})
- Elevation: 430 ft (131 m)

Population (2020)
  - Total: 449
  - Density: 148.4/sq mi (57.28/km^{2})
- Time zone: UTC-6 (Central (CST))
  - Summer (DST): UTC-5 (CDT)
- ZIP code: 42452
- Area codes: 270 & 364
- FIPS code: 21-65874
- GNIS feature ID: 0502050

Robards (/ˈrɒbərdz/) is a home rule-class city in Henderson County, Kentucky, United States. As of the 2020 census, Robards had a population of 449.

== History ==
The name of the precinct has gone through three changes. In 1868 it was officially "Robard's Station". In 1880 it became "Robard", and in 1924 the final change made it "Robards". Robards is pronounced "Robberds". The early settlers of the area included Reuben Moss, George Robards, George Eakins, Bennett Sandefur, Jordan Moss, Enoch Spencer, Thomas Reidout, Ben Wall, Nathan Smith, T. W. Royster, James McMullin, and Samuel McMullin Sr.

As far back as 1810 and through 1840, and even later, before Robards became a community, its site attracted daring horsemen who raced their steeds there on a race track, which was a straight half mile section of road, congregating to bet.

George Rudy's school house was built before 1840, and between 1840 and 1848 the school had four teachers: Washington Sale, Dave Cowan, Frank Davis, and Joseph C. Norman. The Methodists built a church near the school, and in 1853 it was dedicated as "McMullin's Chapel". Two of the chief battles of the American Civil War in this county took place at what would become Robards.

J.D. Robards, for whom Robards was named, built the first house in 1867. This was a frame store house which was also used as a dry goods, grocery and general merchandise store. In this store, he carried on a business totaling from $25,000 to $40,000 per year. He also owned and operated a tobacco stemmery which employed 50 men and shipped directly to Europe. In the twenty years after the Civil War, Robards doubled in population. The average price of land in the 1800s was $20–$25 per acre. While tobacco, corn and wheat were the chief cash crops, a number of farmers were engaged in cattle raising.

In 1880, businesses in Robards included John W. Arnett and J.L. Burdon as physicians and surgeons; S.W. Spencer serving as manager of the Robard's Station Co-operative Grange Store; and F.M. Eakins as the druggist as well as express agent on the Henderson Branch of the L&N Railroad. Jasper Robards and John F. Schanebach accommodated the blacksmithing needs of the community. John W. Royster Jr. was a buyer and dealer of leaf tobacco. J.D. Robards ran the dry goods store. J.T. Williams was the carpenter. R.S. Triplett was also a merchant in the area. A.B. Sugg supplied the area's stock needs. Mosco Cox was the local teacher. Robards in 1880 had a population of 100 and daily mail delivery. There was one ample frame building used for the district common school and for religious services. The Christian denomination had the only established church, with S.W. Cowan serving as pastor, in the 1880s. Three coal mines were opened during the 1880s and continued into the 1920s. In 1887, Starling reported that Robards had nine stores, a steam mill, a school building, a church with a seating capacity of 400, a large livery stable and a good hotel.

Lucy Furman, a fiction writer, told events of Robards Station as they related to the religious sect that flourished during the late 19th century. Her book, Stories of a Sanctified Town (1896), was so true to life that the residents of Robards recognized her characters in spite of changed names and combinations of locales. Present-day southbound travelers on U.S. 41 will see a road sign calling Robards "the Sanctified Town".

== Geography ==
Robards is located in southern Henderson County at 37°40′29″N 87°32′35″W (37.674669, -87.542918). The original town center is on Kentucky Route 416, 1.8 miles (2.9 km) west of U.S. Route 41. The city limits now extend east past US-41 to Interstate 69, the Pennyrile Parkway, with access from Exit 68. Henderson, the county seat, is 14 miles (23 km) north of Robards via I-69, and Madisonville is 28 miles (45 km) to the south.

According to the United States Census Bureau, Robards has a total area of 3.1 square miles (7.9 km^{2}), of which 0.02 square miles (0.04 km^{2}), or 0.55%, are water. Robards sits on a low height of land between the watershed of Canoe Creek, which flows north to the Ohio River, and Grane Creek, which flows south via Graves Creek to the Green River, also a tributary of the Ohio.

== Demographics ==
Historical population
Census	Pop.	Note	%±
2000	564		—
2010	515		−8.7%
2020	449		−12.8%
U.S. Decennial Census

As of the census of 2000, there were 564 people, 214 households, and 172 families residing in the city. The population density was 183.5 inhabitants per square mile (70.8/km^{2}). There were 226 housing units at an average density of 73.5 per square mile (28.4/km^{2}). The racial makeup of the city was 97.87% White, 1.42% Black or African American, 0.53% Native American, and 0.18% from two or more races.

There were 214 households, out of which 34.6% had children under the age of 18 living with them, 70.6% were married couples living together, 7.5% had a female householder with no husband present, and 19.2% were non-families. 17.3% of all households were made up of individuals, and 7.5% had someone living alone who was 65 years of age or older. The average household size was 2.64 and the average family size was 2.97.

In the city, the population was spread out, with 25.4% under the age of 18, 6.4% from 18 to 24, 29.8% from 25 to 44, 26.8% from 45 to 64, and 11.7% who were 65 years of age or older. The median age was 40 years. For every 100 females, there were 100.7 males. For every 100 females age 18 and over, there were 102.4 males.

The median income for a household in the city was $42,019, and the median income for a family was $45,000. Males had a median income of $36,538 versus $21,324 for females. The per capita income for the city was $18,706. About 4.5% of families and 5.2% of the population were below the poverty line, including 7.8% of those under age 18 and 4.8% of those age 65 or over.
