= Western Kentucky Parkway =

Highway in Kentucky, U.S.

Western Kentucky Parkway
- Western Kentucky Parkway highlighted in red

Route information
- Maintained by KYTC
- Length: 98.485 mi (158.496 km)

Major junctions
- West end: I-69 / I-169 near Nortonville
- US 431 / KY 70 near Central City; I-165 near Beaver Dam; I-65 in Elizabethtown
- East end: US 31W / KY 61 in Elizabethtown

Location
- Country: United States
- State: Kentucky
- Counties: Hopkins, Muhlenberg, Ohio, Butler, Grayson, Hardin

Highway system
- Kentucky State Highway System; Interstate; US; State; Parkways

The Wendell H. Ford Western Kentucky Parkway is a 98.5-mile-long (158.5 km) freeway running from Elizabethtown to near Nortonville, Kentucky. It intersects with Interstate 65 (I-65) at its eastern terminus, and I-69 at its western terminus. It is one of seven highways that are part of the Kentucky parkway system. The road was renamed for Wendell H. Ford, a former Kentucky governor and United States senator, in 1998. Previously, it was simply the Western Kentucky Parkway, and often called the "WK Parkway" or "the WK" because of the initials that were once used on its signs prior to the 1998 renaming. The parkway carries the unsigned designation Kentucky Route 9001 (WK 9001) for its entire length.

== Route description ==
Western Kentucky Parkway, facing east from the KY 259 overpass in Leitchfield.

The parkway passes the towns of Nortonville, Graham, Central City, Beaver Dam, Caneyville, Leitchfield, Clarkson, and Eastview. At exit 38 near Nortonville, at its western terminus, the parkway intersects with Interstate 69, which connects to Henderson, Interstate 24 westbound and Calvert City and Interstate 169 (formerly known as the Edward T. Breathitt Pennyrile Parkway), which connects the parkway to Hopkinsville and I-24. At exit 77 near Beaver Dam, the parkway intersects with Interstate 165 (formerly the William H. Natcher Parkway), which goes from Bowling Green to Owensboro.

The highway crosses the line between the Central Time Zone and Eastern Time Zone at the border of Grayson and Hardin counties near Big Clifty.

== Service area ==
A service area, which featured a gas station and an Arby's restaurant until it abruptly closed in January 2017 and is now a convenience store, is located in the median, just west of the interchange with I-165. It is the only such service area in the entire Kentucky parkway system. (Two other service areas were once located on the old Kentucky Turnpike, a toll road from Louisville to Elizabethtown that predated the parkway system and later became part of I-65; they were closed when toll collection ended and the turnpike was officially absorbed into the Interstate Highway System.) It was initially reported that the closure was permanent, but a spokesperson for the Kentucky Transportation Cabinet (KYTC) soon indicated that the closure was temporary. In January 2017, KYTC started a bidding process to find a new vendor and reopen the service area. The bidding was won by regional convenience store chain Huck's, which reopened the area on March 9, 2018, and held a ceremonial reopening on March 16. According to the KYTC, it now features a total of 18 fuel pumps (10 regular, 8 diesel), plus a variety of prepared foods and a restaurant. The service station is colloquially known as the "Land Between the Lanes" as a reference to the nearby Land Between the Lakes National Recreation Area.

== History ==
The Western Kentucky Parkway's previous shield (1998–2007)

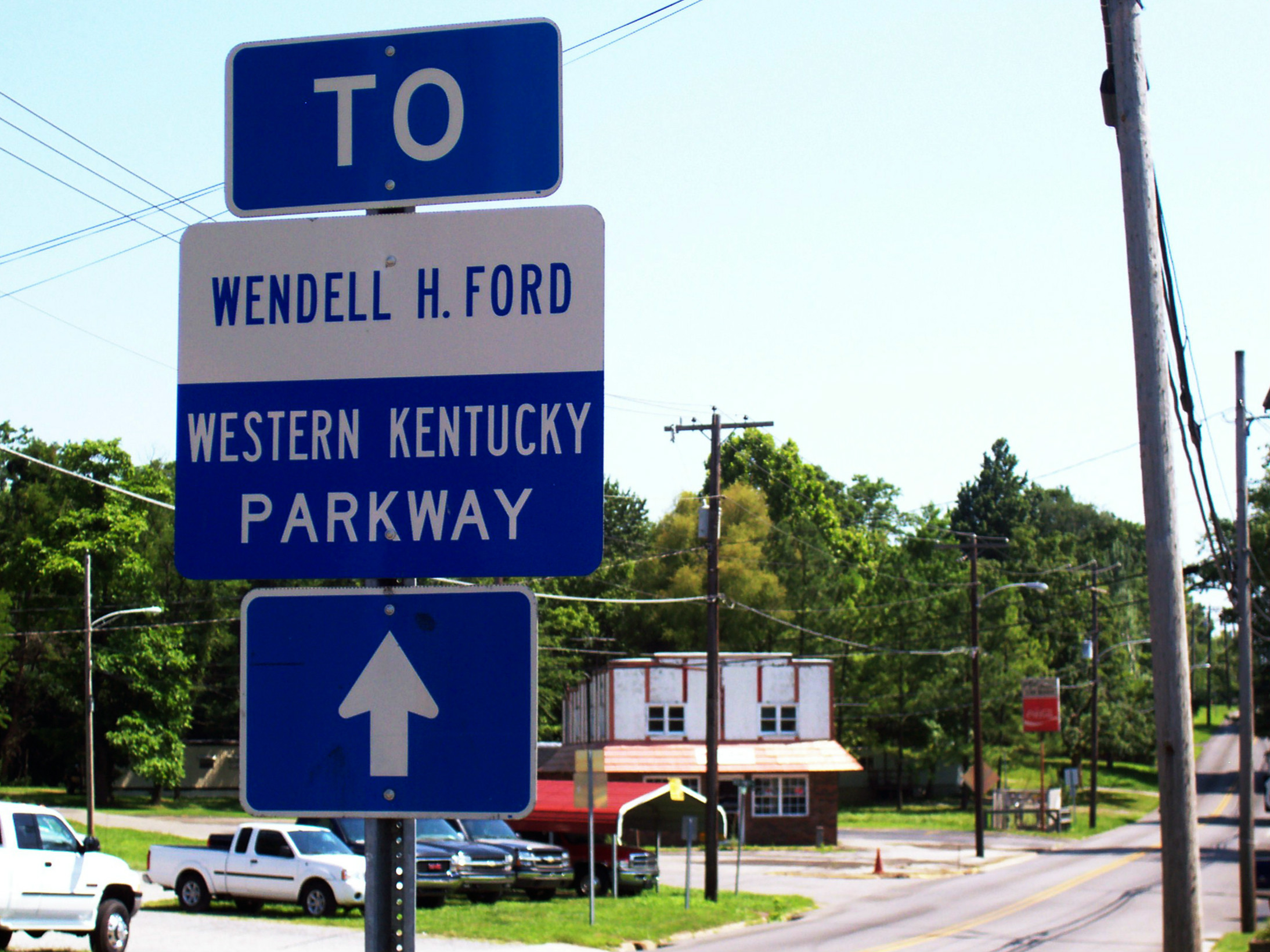
Trailblazer signage for the Western Kentucky Parkway (1998–2007 shield) on U.S. Route 641 in Marion, Kentucky

The original segment of the parkway was envisioned as a 127-mile (204 km) toll road extending from Elizabethtown to Princeton. The bonds were issued in 1961 and construction wrapped up on the original 127.19 miles (204.69 km) in December 1963 at a cost of $108,548,062. The name of the roadway was chosen by means of a contest sponsored by the Kentucky Turnpike Authority, which originally issued the bonds for the parkway's construction. In 1968, construction wrapped up on a 6.60-mile (10.62 km) extension of the Western Kentucky Parkway from Princeton to Interstate 24 in Eddyville at a cost of $5,554,468. The extension was originally proposed to be 10.30 miles (16.58 km) but only 6.60 miles (10.62 km) were constructed, possibly due to a design realignment of Interstate 24 near Eddyville.

=== Toll plazas ===
The parkway was originally a toll road, as were all Kentucky parkways. State law requires that toll collection ceases when enough tolls are collected to pay off the parkway's construction bonds, which in the case of the Western Kentucky Parkway, had occurred in 1987. It is constructed similar to the Interstate Highway System, though sections do not currently meet all interstate design requirements.

Prior to toll removal, staffed toll plazas were located at mile 10 (now mile 78 of I-69) just west of Princeton, exit 24 (now I-69 exit 92) in Dawson Springs, exit 58 in Central City, and exit 107 in Leitchfield. In addition, an unmanned toll facility was located at exit 94 near Caneyville, where tolls were paid only by traffic exiting eastbound and entering westbound.

=== Interstate 69 ===
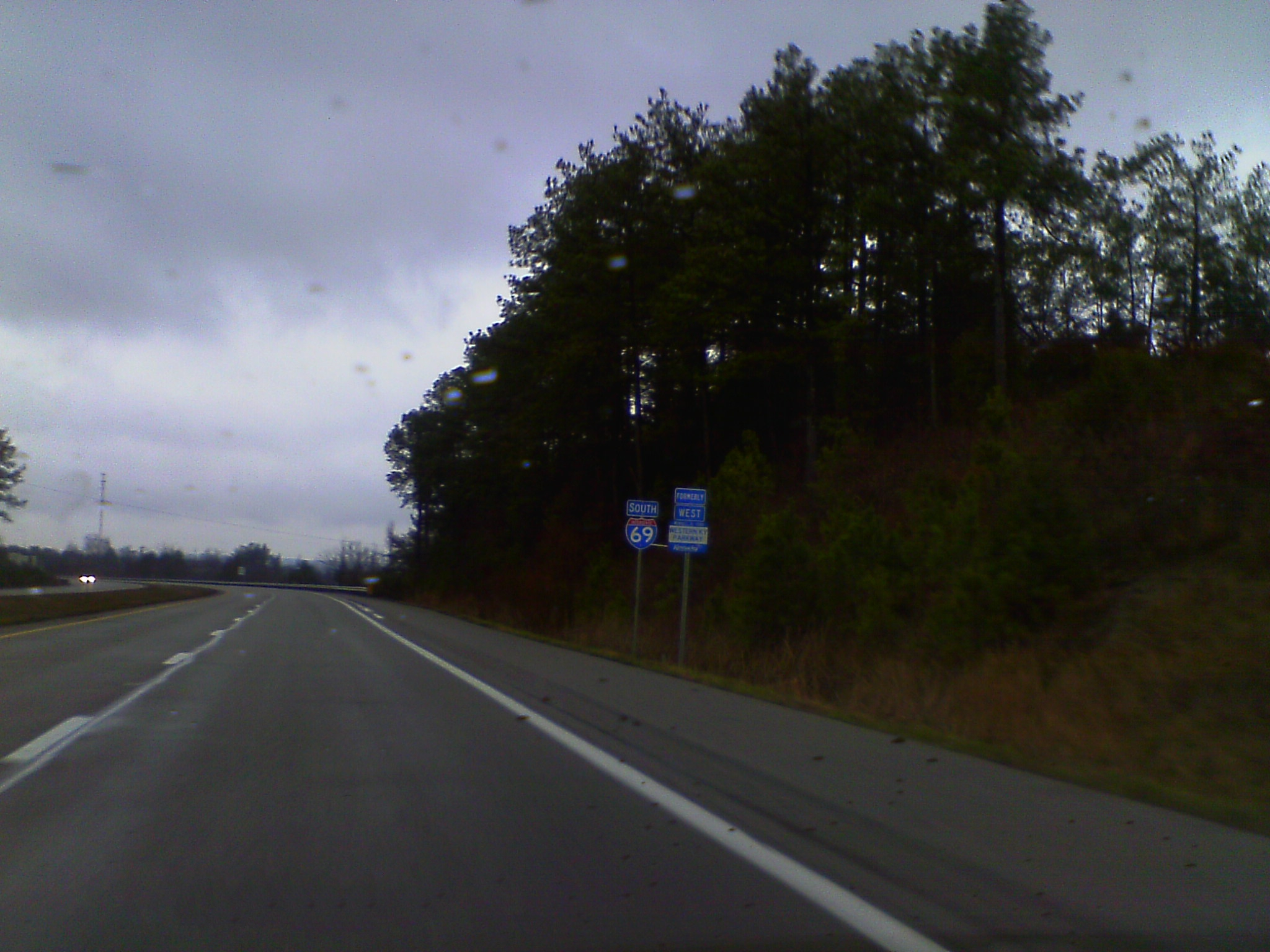
Parkway co-signed with I-69 near Dawson Springs, before section was signed only as I-69

On May 15, 2006, the section between the Breathitt (Pennyrile) Parkway at Nortonville and Interstate 24 became part of future Interstate 69; crews installed "Future I-69 Corridor" signs along this segment during the last week of May 2006.

From the Pennyrile Parkway in Nortonville to Interstate 24, the Western Kentucky Parkway officially became part of I-69 with the signing of federal highway legislation (see below) on June 6, 2008. By using an existing expressway for I-69, Kentucky officials avoided years of federal environmental studies since the upgrades are concurrent with the existing highway. The decision to use it ended talk of a new route for I-69 through Union, Crittenden and Livingston counties along the Ohio River.

On May 2, 2008, the U.S. House of Representatives passed HR 1195 (SAFETEA-LU Technical Corrections Act of 2008) which designates the Pennyrile Parkway from Henderson to Nortonville, and the Western Kentucky Parkway from Nortonville to I-24 at Eddyville as I-69. It further designates the Audubon Parkway as a future spur (likely to be I-369) of I-69 once necessary upgrades are completed. President George W. Bush signed the bill on June 6, 2008.

In September 2011, Governor Steve Beshear, a native of Dawson Springs, announced an agreement with the Federal Highway Administration (FHWA), officially designating this section as I-69, effective September 30, 2011. The Kentucky Transportation Cabinet unveiled I-69 signs along the route on October 25, 2011.

Signage and mile markers were replaced on the 38-mile (61 km) westernmost stretch of the Western Kentucky Parkway in mid-December 2012. The mileposts on the rest of the parkway remained unchanged with the original exit numbers.

In a project that began in 2014 and ended in late 2015, the interchange between the parkway and the Pennyrile Parkway was extensively modified to create a curve in the northwest quadrant (for eastbound-to-northbound and southbound-to-westbound traffic on I-69) to meet federal design requirements. Previously, I-69 thru traffic had to exit through tight ramps in a substandard cloverleaf.

== Future ==
=== Interstate 569 ===
Future Interstate 569
- Location: Nortonville–Beaver Dam
- Length: 38.446 mi (61.873 km)

On April 3, 2019, Representative James Comer and Senator Mitch McConnell introduced a bill that would designate 38.446 miles (61.873 km) of the Western Kentucky Parkway as an interstate spur of I-69 from the I-69/I-169 (Pennyrile Parkway) interchange near Nortonville to the I-165 (Natcher Parkway) interchange near Beaver Dam. It was originally numbered Interstate 369 (I-369), but was changed to Interstate 569 (I-569) in December 2019 as the I-369 designation is proposed for the Audubon Parkway. Signage indicating that the highway would become part of the I-569 corridor were unveiled on December 21, 2022, after FHWA approved the new signage on the highway. This section would require spot improvements to upgrade the parkway to interstate standards, including the reconstruction of the Exit 58 interchange, before I-569 could be signed. This spur has been designated as High Priority Corridor 91 by the FHWA.

== Exit list ==
County	Location	mi	km	Old exit	New exit	Destinations	Notes
Hopkins	Nortonville	38.311	61.656	38	1	I-69 / I-169 south – Fulton, Hopkinsville, Henderson	Western terminus; signed as parkway exit 1A and I-69 exit 106A (south) and parkway exit 1B and I-69 exit 106B (east/north)
Muhlenberg	Graham	48.049	77.327	48	10	KY 175 (Cemetery Road)	
Muhlenberg	Powderly	52.518	84.520	53	15	KY 181 – Sacramento, Greenville	Serves Lake Malone State Park
Muhlenberg	Central City	57.947	93.257	58	20	US 431 / KY 70 – Drakesboro, Central City	Serves Lake Malone State Park
Ohio	Beaver Dam	74.564	119.999	75	37	US 231 – Beaver Dam, Morgantown	
Ohio	Beaver Dam	76.757	123.528	77	39	I-165 – Bowling Green, Owensboro	I-165 exits 41A-B; signed as exits 77A (south) and 77B (north); cloverleaf interchange; future eastern terminus of I-569
Grayson	Caneyville	94.225	151.640		94	KY 79 – Caneyville, Morgantown	Serves Rough River Dam State Resort Park
Grayson	Leitchfield	106.965	172.143		107	KY 259 – Leitchfield, Brownsville	Serves Mammoth Cave National Park and Nolin Lake State Park
Grayson	Clarkson	111.875	180.045		112	KY 224 – Clarkson, Millerstown	Signs at interchange on KY 224 say it goes to Upton
Hardin	Eastview	123.474	198.712		124	KY 84 – Eastview, White Mills	Very near US 62, which roughly parallels the parkway its entire length
Hardin	Elizabethtown	133	214		133	KY 3005 east (Ring Road) – Elizabethtown, Ft. Knox	Interchange constructed in 2012
Hardin	Elizabethtown	135.816	218.575		136	US 31W Byp. north – Fort Knox	Western end of US 31W Bypass concurrency
Hardin	Elizabethtown	136.545	219.748		137	I-65 to Bluegrass Parkway – Nashville, Lexington, Louisville	I-65 exit 91; signed as exits 137A (south) and 137B (north); former southern terminus of the Kentucky Turnpike, I-65 continued south
Hardin	Elizabethtown	136.796	220.152			US 31W / US 31W Byp. south / KY 61 – Elizabethtown, Hodgenville	Eastern terminus; eastern end of US 31W Bypass concurrency; southern terminus of US 31W Bypass; at-grade intersection
1.000 mi = 1.609 km; 1.000 km = 0.621 mi: Concurrency terminus
