= Henderson City-County Airport =

Airport in Kentucky, United States of America

- IATA: none; ICAO: KEHR; FAA LID: EHR

Summary
- Airport type: Public
- Owner: City & County of Henderson
- Serves: Henderson, Kentucky
- Elevation AMSL: 387 ft (118 m)
- Coordinates: 37°48′28″N 087°41′08″W

Map
- Location of airport in Kentucky EHR (the United States)

Runways
Direction	Length		Surface
Direction	ft	m	Surface
9/27	5,503	1,677	Asphalt

Statistics (2019)
- Aircraft operations (year ending 11/6/2019: 33,000
- Based aircraft: 18
- Source: Federal Aviation Administration

Henderson City-County Airport (ICAO: KEHR, FAA LID: EHR) is a public use airport located four nautical miles (7 km) west of the central business district of Henderson, a city in Henderson County, Kentucky, United States. The airport is owned by the City & County of Henderson.

Although most U.S. airports use the same three-letter location identifier for the FAA and IATA, this airport is assigned EHR by the FAA but has no designation from the IATA.

== Facilities and aircraft ==
Henderson City-County Airport covers an area of 80 acres (32 ha) at an elevation of 387 feet (118 m) above mean sea level. It has one asphalt paved runway designated 9/27 which measures 5,503 by 100 feet (1,677 x 30 m).

For the 12-month period ending November 6, 2019, the airport had 33,000 aircraft operations, an average of 90 per day: 91% general aviation, 9% air taxi and <1% military. At that time there were 18 aircraft based at this airport: 15 single-engine, 2 multi-engine, and 1 jet.

== See also ==
- List of airports in Kentucky
