= Nortonville, Kentucky =

- City
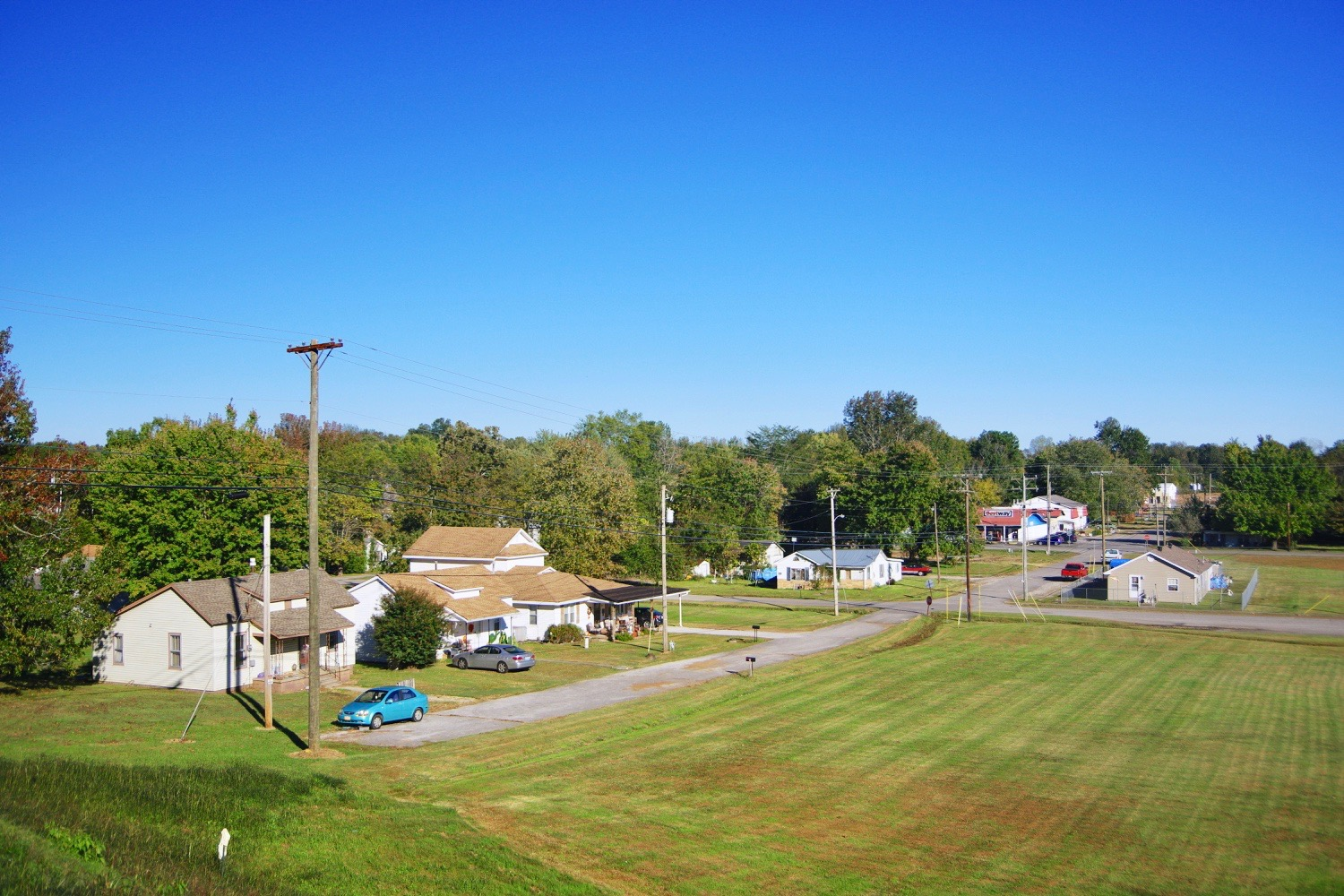
- Walnut Street in Nortonville

- Location of Nortonville in Hopkins County, Kentucky.
- Coordinates: 37°11′16″N 87°27′22″W
- Country: United States
- State: Kentucky
- County: Hopkins
- Incorporated: 1873

Area
  - Total: 1.19 sq mi (3.09 km^{2})
  - Land: 1.16 sq mi (3.00 km^{2})
  - Water: 0.035 sq mi (0.09 km^{2})
- Elevation: 404 ft (123 m)

Population (2020)
  - Total: 977
  - Density: 843.1/sq mi (325.54/km^{2})
- Time zone: UTC-6 (Central (CST))
  - Summer (DST): UTC-5 (CDT)
- ZIP code: 42442
- Area codes: 270 & 364
- FIPS code: 21-56910
- GNIS feature ID: 0499617
- Website: www.nortonvilleky.us

Nortonville is a home rule-class city in Hopkins County, Kentucky, in the United States. As of the 2020 census, Nortonville had a population of 977.

== History ==
Nortonville owes its existence to the railroad industry and is named for Eckstein Norton, a Kentucky-born investment banker who started as a clerk in a country store in Russellville, Kentucky, in 1846. Norton participated in the creation of the Elizabethtown and Paducah Railroad in the late 1860s (east-west tracks). He then purchased 2,000 acres (8.1 km^{2}) of land in what would become "Norton Village", later changed to "Nortonville" around 1900. Norton became a shipping agent for the Illinois Central Railroad, which eventually acquired the Elizabethtown & Paducah Railroad. The north–south railroad, named the Evansville, Henderson and Nashville, was completed through Nortonville in 1872. It was purchased in a foreclosure sale in 1879 by the Louisville and Nashville Railroad. Norton became president of the L&N Railroad on October 6, 1886. By 1886, Nortonville was one of only nine towns in the L&N system to have a steam hoist to unload and transfer freight. By then, the city was concentrated around a junction of the IC and L&N Railroads. Nortonville saw growth after 1902, when investors purchased land from the Norton heirs and opened a shaft coal mine as the Nortonville Coal Company. They also operated an electric power plant.

Nortonville implemented its first water system in 1936 and paved its streets in 1956. A centralized sewage treatment system was built in the late 1970s, opening an opportunity for continued growth. The Nortonville City Hall occupies the well-maintained 1930s high school building, which was built by the WPA.

== Geography ==
Nortonville is located in southeastern Hopkins County at 37°11′16″N 87°27′22″W (37.187660, -87.456032). U.S. Route 41 passes through the eastern and southern parts of the city, leading north 11 miles (18 km) to Madisonville, the county seat, and south 24 miles (39 km) to Hopkinsville. U.S. Route 62 passes through the northern part of Nortonville, leading east 18 miles (29 km) to Greenville and west 14 miles (23 km) to Dawson Springs.

The Western Kentucky Parkway and Pennyrile Parkway intersect 2 miles (3 km) northeast of Nortonville. Interstate 69 follows the Western Kentucky Parkway west from the interchange towards Eddyville and the Pennyrile Parkway north towards Henderson. Paducah is 72 miles (116 km) to the west, Evansville, Indiana, is 55 miles (89 km) to the north, Elizabethtown is 100 miles (160 km) to the east, and Clarksville, Tennessee, is 55 miles (89 km) south of the highway junction.

According to the United States Census Bureau, Nortonville has a total area of 1.1 square miles (2.9 km^{2}), of which 0.012 square miles (0.03 km^{2}), or 1.02%, are water.

== Demographics ==
Historical population
Census	Pop.	Note	%±
1880	49		—
1910	254		—
1920	773		204.3%
1930	829		7.2%
1940	989		19.3%
1950	909		−8.1%
1960	755		−16.9%
1970	699		−7.4%
1980	1,336		91.1%
1990	1,209		−9.5%
2000	1,264		4.5%
2010	1,204		−4.7%
2020	977		−18.9%
U.S. Decennial Census

As of the census of 2000, there were 1,264 people, 525 households, and 363 families residing in the city. The population density was 1,136.3 inhabitants per square mile (438.7/km^{2}). There were 584 housing units at an average density of 525.0 units per square mile (202.7 units/km^{2}). The racial makeup of the city was 96.44% White, 2.06% Black or African American, 0.55% Native American, 0.08% from other races, and 0.87% from two or more races. Hispanic or Latino of any race were 0.87% of the population.

There were 525 households, out of which 28.2% had children under the age of 18 living with them, 54.1% were married couples living together, 12.2% had a female householder with no husband present, and 30.7% were non-families. 28.4% of all households were made up of individuals, and 13.1% had someone living alone who was 65 years of age or older. The average household size was 2.41 and the average family size was 2.93.

In the city, the population was spread out, with 24.1% under the age of 18, 8.8% from 18 to 24, 29.0% from 25 to 44, 23.0% from 45 to 64, and 15.1% who were 65 years of age or older. The median age was 36 years. For every 100 females, there were 95.1 males. For every 100 females age 18 and over, there were 89.0 males.

The median income for a household in the city was $27,222, and the median income for a family was $31,466. Males had a median income of $27,986 versus $17,176 for females. The per capita income for the city was $13,179. About 17.9% of families and 20.3% of the population were below the poverty line, including 27.1% of those under age 18 and 13.1% of those age 65 or over.

== Education ==
Local schools include Southside Elementary; South Hopkins Middle School and Hopkins County Central High School.
