= National Register of Historic Places listings in Hopkins County, Kentucky =

Location of Hopkins County in Kentucky

This is a list of the National Register of Historic Places listings in Hopkins County, Kentucky.

This is intended to be a complete list of the properties and districts on the National Register of Historic Places in Hopkins County, Kentucky, United States. The locations of National Register properties and districts for which the latitude and longitude coordinates are included below, may be seen in a map.

There are 32 properties and districts listed on the National Register in the county. Another property was once listed but has been removed.

This National Park Service list is complete through NPS recent listings posted April 11, 2025.

== Current listings ==
| | Name on the Register | Image | Date listed | Location | City or town | Description |
|---|---|---|---|---|---|---|
| 1 | Archeological Site 15 HK 46 and 47 | | July 28, 1980 (#80001553) | Address Restricted | White Plains | |
| 2 | Archeological Site 15 HK 79 | | December 4, 1980 (#80001552) | Address Restricted | Nebo | |
| 3 | Archeological Site 15 HK 8 | | August 1, 1980 (#80001551) | Address Restricted | Hanson | |
| 4 | Beulah Lodge | Beulah Lodge | March 8, 1989 (#88002718) | Kentucky Route 70, 0.5 miles west of its junction with Kentucky Route 109; 37°16′17″N 87°41′24″W | Dawson Springs | |
| 5 | John Cox House | | December 13, 1988 (#88002715) | Kentucky Route 502, 0.5 miles north of Nebo; 37°23′37″N 87°38′20″W | Nebo | The house has been demolished. |
| 6 | Cranor School | Cranor School | March 8, 1989 (#88002721) | Buttermilk Rd., 0.2 miles southeast of its junction with Hamby Rd. 37°07′46″N 87°35′09″W | St. Charles | |
| 7 | The Darby House | The Darby House | August 15, 1997 (#97000871) | 301 W. Arcadia Ave. 37°10′00″N 87°41′37″W | Dawson Springs | |
| 8 | Dawson Springs Historic District | Dawson Springs Historic District | December 13, 1988 (#88002710) | 100 block of S. Main St.; also roughly bounded by Keigan St., Water St., Arcadia Ave., Hunter St., and Sycamore St.; also generally bounded on the north by Keigan St., on the south by Water St. and Arcadia Avenue, the east by Hunter St., and west by Sycamore St. 37°10′04″N 87°41′33″W | Dawson Springs | Second and third groups of streets represent boundary increases approved August 14, 1998 and April 14, 2025. |
| 9 | Bazle Edmiston House | Bazle Edmiston House | December 13, 1988 (#88002719) | Kentucky Route 291, 0.2 miles west of its junction with Kentucky Route 109; 37°19′30″N 87°43′07″W | Nebo | |
| 10 | Dr. Thomas Gardiner House | Dr. Thomas Gardiner House | December 13, 1988 (#88002727) | 173 Sugg St. 37°19′39″N 87°30′08″W | Madisonville | |
| 11 | Hanson Historic District | Hanson Historic District | December 13, 1988 (#88002711) | Roughly Main St. from U.S. Route 41 to E. Railroad St. 37°25′02″N 87°28′54″W | Hanson | |
| 12 | John Harvey House | John Harvey House | December 13, 1988 (#88002731) | 175 N. Seminary St. 37°19′54″N 87°30′07″W | Madisonville | Designed by architect George Franklin Barber |
| 13 | L.D. Hockersmith House | L.D. Hockersmith House | December 13, 1988 (#88002729) | 218 S. Scott St. 37°19′29″N 87°29′44″W | Madisonville | |
| 14 | Hotel Earlington | Hotel Earlington | December 13, 1988 (#88002725) | 118 E. Main St. 37°16′28″N 87°30′41″W | Earlington | |
| 15 | Beckley Jackson House | Beckley Jackson House | March 23, 1989 (#88002733) | Kentucky Route 1069, 0.2 miles south of its junction with Jones Rd. 37°26′40″N 87°31′50″W | Hanson | |
| 16 | Gabriel Jennings House | Gabriel Jennings House | December 13, 1988 (#88002720) | Kentucky Route 70, 1 mile east of its junction with Kentucky Route 291; 37°16′17″N 87°46′02″W | Dawson Springs | |
| 17 | W.W. Kington House | W.W. Kington House | December 13, 1988 (#88002724) | 109 Crooked St. 37°14′24″N 87°28′22″W | Mortons Gap | |
| 18 | Chittenden P. Lyon, Jr. House | Chittenden P. Lyon, Jr. House | October 18, 1976 (#76000898) | 304 Union St. 37°19′26″N 87°29′53″W | Madisonville | |
| 19 | Madisonville Armory | Madisonville Armory | September 6, 2002 (#02000927) | 670 Park Ave. 37°18′59″N 87°29′19″W | Madisonville | |
| 20 | Madisonville Commercial Historic District | Madisonville Commercial Historic District | December 13, 1988 (#88002712) | Center and Main Sts. 37°19′40″N 87°29′55″W | Madisonville | |
| 21 | Madisonville Public Library | Madisonville Public Library | December 13, 1988 (#88002728) | 107 S. Union St. 37°19′36″N 87°29′54″W | Madisonville | |
| 22 | Madisonville Tuberculosis Hospital | Madisonville Tuberculosis Hospital | August 4, 2016 (#16000496) | 625 Hospital Dr. 37°20′26″N 87°29′27″W | Madisonville | |
| 23 | Frederick Miller House | | December 13, 1988 (#88002723) | U.S. Route 62, 2.1 miles west of White Plains; 37°11′32″N 87°25′14″W | White Plains | |
| 24 | Munn's School | Munn's School | August 30, 1983 (#83002796) | Princeton Rd. 37°18′54″N 87°31′48″W | Madisonville | |
| 25 | North Main Street Historic District | North Main Street Historic District | December 13, 1988 (#88002713) | Roughly the 200 and 300 blocks of N. Main St. 37°19′57″N 87°29′51″W | Madisonville | |
| 26 | Oakmoor | Oakmoor | December 13, 1988 (#88002726) | E. Main St. 37°16′37″N 87°30′30″W | Earlington | |
| 27 | Bradford Porter House | Bradford Porter House | December 13, 1988 (#88002714) | U.S. Route 41A, 1 mile west of its junction with Kentucky Route 630; 37°22′40″N 87°35′57″W | Nebo | |
| 28 | Turner Ruby House | Turner Ruby House | December 13, 1988 (#88002730) | 264 S. Union St. 37°19′27″N 87°29′53″W | Madisonville | |
| 29 | Richard Salmon House | Richard Salmon House | December 13, 1988 (#88002722) | Kentucky Route 112; 37°11′52″N 87°36′34″W | Dawson Springs | |
| 30 | James E. Slaton House | | December 13, 1988 (#88002717) | Off County Highway 1221; 37°17′31″N 87°25′17″W | Madisonville vic. | 1864-built I-House |
| 31 | US Post Office-Madisonville | US Post Office-Madisonville | January 3, 1989 (#88003196) | 56 N. Main St. 37°19′46″N 87°29′54″W | Madisonville | |
| 32 | Zion Brick Missionary Church | Zion Brick Missionary Church | December 13, 1988 (#88002716) | Crossroad Chapel Rd., 0.3 miles north of its junction with Kentucky Route 138; 37°29′56″N 87°28′46″W | Hanson | |

== Former listing ==
| | Name on the Register | Image | Date listed | Date removed | Location | City or town | Description |
|---|---|---|---|---|---|---|---|
| 1 | Hamby Well Building | | April 19, 1972 (#72000534) | February 3, 1988 | 120 S. Main St. | Dawson Springs | |

== See also ==
- List of National Historic Landmarks in Kentucky
- National Register of Historic Places listings in Kentucky
