= Darby House =

Darby House or The Darby House or variations may refer to:

in England

- Darby Houses, in Coalbrookdale, a museum in Shropshire

in the United States

(by state then town)

- E. H. Darby Lustron House, Florence, Alabama, a Lustron house that is listed on the National Register of Historic Places (NRHP) in Lauderdale County
- The Darby House (Dawson Springs, Kentucky), listed on the NRHP in Hopkins County
- Darby House (Baldwin, Louisiana), listed on the NRHP in St. Mary Parish
- Darby House, of Darby Plantation (New Iberia, Louisiana), listed on the NRHP in Iberia Parish
- Darby House, of Darby Store historic site, in Beallsville, Maryland
- Darby House, the main house of Darby Dan Farm, in Galloway, Ohio
- Darby Meeting, also known as Darby Friends Meeting House, in Darby, Pennsylvania, NRHP-listed
- Darby House, of Darby Plantation (Edgefield, South Carolina), listed on the NRHP in Edgefield County

== See also ==
- Darby Plantation (disambiguation)
