= Oscar M. Corbin Jr. =

American politician

Oscar Monroe Corbin Jr.

54th Mayor of Fort Myers, Florida
- In office 1967–1976
- Preceded by: Paul J. Myers
- Succeeded by: Burl A. Underhill

Personal details
- Born: May 3, 1918 near Nebo, Kentucky
- Died: May 8, 2012 (aged 94) Fort Myers, Florida
- Spouse: Wilhelmina Mathis Corbin
- Children: 3
- Relatives: Randy Henderson Jr. (son-in-law)
- Education: University of Kentucky
- Occupation: Businessman, politician, Army Air Corp Veteran

Military service
- Allegiance: United States
- Branch/service: United States Army Air Forces
- Years of service: 1941-1946
- Rank: Lt. Colonel

Oscar M. Corbin Jr. (May 3, 1918 – May 8, 2012) was a former mayor of Fort Myers, Florida.

== Early years ==
He was born on the Corbin farm near Nebo, Hopkins County, Kentucky, on May 3, 1918. He graduated from the University of Kentucky in 1940 with a B.S. in agriculture.

== Military service ==
He was commissioned a 2d Lt. in the Army Air Corps on December 5, 1941, and he was assigned to an air gunnery instruction squadron at Buckingham Field near Fort Myers. By the end of World War II he was promoted to the rank of Major. After the war he served in the Air Force Reserves and retired as a Lt. Colonel.

== Business ==
In 1946 when his service in World War II ended he returned to Western Kentucky where he taught vocational agriculture until he opened a feed store with his brother John in Providence, Kentucky. He was elected and served on the city council in Providence.

In 1951 Oscar sold his half interest in the store and moved to Fort Myers where he purchased a feed store in downtown located at the corner of Main and Monroe Streets, "Corbin Farm Supply." Within five years his parents and siblings followed him to Fort Myers. In 1955 he opened another feed store in Naples and in 1959 he opened a retail warehouse store on Edison Ave. In 1960 he opened a garden store, "Corbin Garden Center," on Colonial Blvd. By 1966 he had sold his retail businesses and for the next 20 years he was a real estate broker. He built, owned and sold apartments and other commercial real estate developments, all of which prospered.

== Mayor ==
Oscar was the Mayor of Fort Myers from 1967 to 1976. During his term he worked with the city council to improve the city's finances and its bond rating and to make many lasting improvements to the city. The present City Hall building was built during his term and a few years ago it was appropriately named in his honor. From 1985 to 1989 he was appointed by the Governor and served on the Board of the South Florida Water District.

== Family ==
Oscar was the son of Oscar M. Corbin Sr. and Artibel Givens Corbin and had three siblings, John G.(Sue) Corbin, Mary Jane Moore, and William B.(Betty) Corbin. In 1942 he married Wilhelmina Mathis of Panama City, FL. They had three children, William M. Corbin, R. Thomas Corbin, and Virginia Corbin Henderson (wife of Randy Henderson, 61st mayor of Fort Myers), and 13 grandchildren.

== See also ==
- Influential local Oscar Corbin Jr dies
- news-press obituary
