= James E. Slaton House =

Historic house in Hopkins County, Kentucky, US

- U.S. National Register of Historic Places
- Location within Kentucky
- Location: Off Kentucky Route 1221, about 6 miles (9.7 km) southeast of Madisonville, Kentucky, U.S.
- Coordinates: 37.29192°N 87.42131°W
- Area: less than one acre
- Built: c. 1860 – c. 1864
- Architectural style: I-house
- MPS: Hopkins County MPS
- NRHP reference No.: 88002717
- Added to NRHP: December 13, 1988

The James E. Slaton House is a historic residence in Hopkins County, Kentucky, near Madisonville, Kentucky. It has been listed on the National Register of Historic Places since December 13, 1988, for the architecture; and is part of the Hopkins County Multiple Property Submission (MPS).

== History ==
The James E. Slaton House was built between c. 1860 – c. 1864, by a local farmer named James E. Slaton (1825–1916). His farm was worked by four to five enslaved Black people at a time, prior to the American Civil War. It is located at the end of KY 1221, which "dead ends right in front of the house". It's on a hill overlooking small tributaries of the Pond River in a rural area of the county where strip mining took place.

The house is influenced by Greek Revival style and is a two-story, central-passage I-house, with a one-story "L" extension. Besides the main house, the listing includes three buildings deemed non-contributing to the historical character of the place.

A two-story porch was added to its west side of the house in 1895, and extends across three of the home's five bays. The porch includes square columns with Doric influenced capitals and square balusters on the railings.

== See also ==
- National Register of Historic Places listings in Hopkins County, Kentucky
