= Kentucky's 4th House of Representatives district =

American legislative district

Kentucky's 4th State House of Representatives district
Representative
Wade Williams; R–Earlington
since January 1, 2023
- Registration: 45.9% Republican; 44.8% Democratic; 8.7% No party preference
- Demographics: 87.3% White; 6.1% Black; 2.5% Hispanic; 0.5% Asian; 0.1% Native American; 0.1% Other; 3.4% Multiracial
- Population (2023): 45,143
- Registered voters (2025): 34,486

Kentucky's 4th House of Representatives district is one of 100 districts in the Kentucky House of Representatives. Located in the western part of the state, it comprises Hopkins County. It has been represented by Wade Williams (R–Earlington) since 2023. As of 2023, the district had a population of 45,143.

== Voter registration ==
On January 1, 2025, the district had 34,486 registered voters, who were registered with the following parties.

Party	Registration	
Party	Voters	%
Republican	15,842	45.94
Democratic	15,458	44.82
Independent	1,394	4.04
Libertarian	132	0.38
Constitution	20	0.06
Green	15	0.04
Reform	4	0.01
Socialist Workers	3	0.01
"Other"	1,618	4.69
Total	34,486	100.00
Source: Kentucky State Board of Elections

== List of members representing the district ==
Member	Party	Years	Electoral history	District location
Rex Smith (Grand Rivers)	Democratic	January 1, 1987 – January 1, 1995	Elected in 1986. Reelected in 1988. Reelected in 1990. Reelected in 1992. Retired.	1985–1993; Crittenden (part), Livingston, and McCracken (part) Counties.
Rex Smith (Grand Rivers)	Democratic	January 1, 1987 – January 1, 1995	Elected in 1986. Reelected in 1988. Reelected in 1990. Reelected in 1992. Retired.	1993–1997; Crittenden, Livingston, and McCracken (part) Counties.
Kathy Hogancamp (Paducah)	Republican	January 1, 1995 – January 1, 1999	Elected in 1994. Reelected in 1996. Retired to run for the Kentucky Senate.	1993–1997; Crittenden, Livingston, and McCracken (part) Counties.
Kathy Hogancamp (Paducah)	Republican	January 1, 1995 – January 1, 1999	Elected in 1994. Reelected in 1996. Retired to run for the Kentucky Senate.	1997–2003
Mike Cherry (Princeton)	Democratic	January 1, 1999 – January 1, 2013	Elected in 1998. Reelected in 2000. Reelected in 2002. Reelected in 2004. Reelected in 2006. Reelected in 2008. Reelected in 2010. Retired.	1997–2003
Mike Cherry (Princeton)	Democratic	January 1, 1999 – January 1, 2013	Elected in 1998. Reelected in 2000. Reelected in 2002. Reelected in 2004. Reelected in 2006. Reelected in 2008. Reelected in 2010. Retired.	2003–2015
Lynn Bechler (Marion)	Republican	January 1, 2013 – January 1, 2023	Elected in 2012. Reelected in 2014. Reelected in 2016. Reelected in 2018. Reelected in 2020. Redistricted to the 12th district and lost renomination.	2003–2015
Lynn Bechler (Marion)	Republican	January 1, 2013 – January 1, 2023	Elected in 2012. Reelected in 2014. Reelected in 2016. Reelected in 2018. Reelected in 2020. Redistricted to the 12th district and lost renomination.	2015–2023
Wade Williams (Earlington)	Republican	January 1, 2023 – present	Elected in 2022. Reelected in 2024. Reelected in 2026.	2023–present
