= Darby Plantation =

Darby Plantation may refer to:

- Darby Plantation (New Iberia, Louisiana), listed on the National Register of Historic Places (NRHP) in Iberia Parish
- Darby Plantation (Edgefield, South Carolina), listed on the NRHP in Edgefield County

== See also ==
- Darby House (disambiguation)
