= John Cox House =

- U.S. National Register of Historic Places
- Location within Kentucky Location within the United States
- Nearest city: Nebo, Kentucky
- Coordinates: 37°23′37″N 87°38′20″W
- Area: less than one acre
- Built: 1875
- Architectural style: I-House
- MPS: Hopkins County MPS
- NRHP reference No.: 88002715
- Added to NRHP: December 13, 1988

The John Cox House, in Hopkins County, Kentucky near Nebo, Kentucky, was built in 1875. It was listed on the National Register of Historic Places in 1988.

It was a two-story brick I-house with a central passage plan. It had an original one-story brick ell to the rear. An original two-story porch on the front facade had been removed.

It has also been known as Sarahlawn Farm, named for Sarah Ramsey Cox, wife of John Cox. The house was built by John Cox, who was born in Virginia in 1827 and came to Hopkins County in 1848. After seeking gold in California in 1852, he returned and bought land to farm, eventually having 1,500 acres (610 ha) in total. He also owned a tobacco warehouse in Nebo. He married in 1856 and replaced his earlier house with this one in 1875. It has been deemed the best remaining historic rural brick house in the county.

A second contributing building on the property is a brick smokehouse, which was determined to be the only historic brick outbuilding in the county.

It is located on Kentucky Route 502, about .5 miles (0.80 km) north of Nebo.

This house has been torn down.
