= Wade Williams (politician) =

American politician (born 1973)

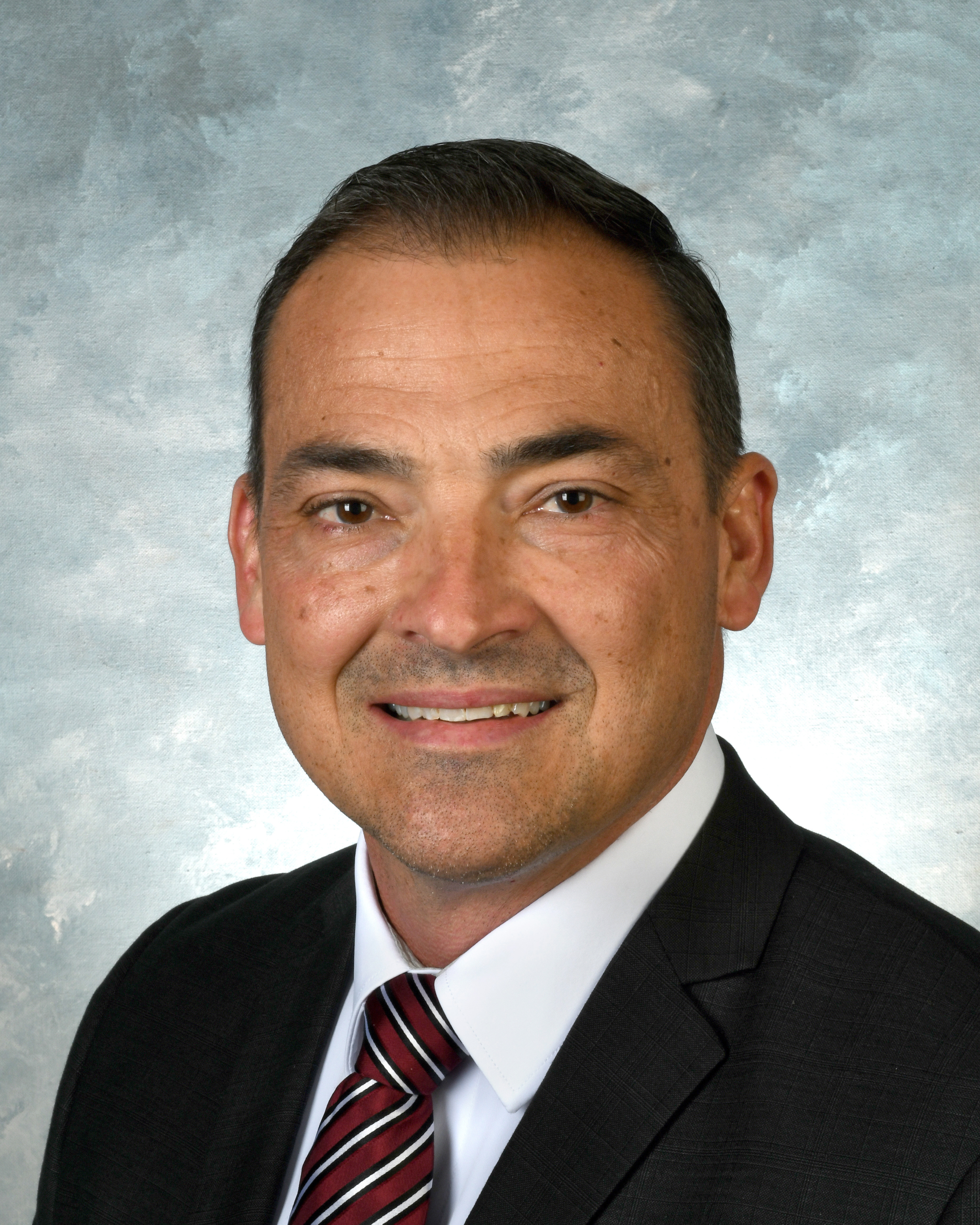
- Official portrait, 2022

Member of the Kentucky House of Representatives from the 4th district
- Incumbent
- Assumed office January 1, 2023
- Preceded by: Lynn Bechler

Personal details
- Born: April 30, 1973 (age 53)
- Party: Republican
- Education: Oakland City University (BS); Murray State University (MPA)
- Committees: Budget Review Subcommittee on Health and Family Services (Vice Chair); Appropriations and Revenue; Judiciary; Natural Resources and Energy; State Government

Danny Wade Williams (born April 30, 1973) is an American politician who has served as a Republican member of the Kentucky House of Representatives since January 2023. He represents Kentucky's 4th House district which includes all of Hopkins County.

== Background ==
Williams is the former police chief in Madisonville, Kentucky. Before this role, he served in the United States Army Reserve for 11 years and was in active service for four years including during Iraqi Freedom. Williams earned a Bachelor of Science in organizational management from Oakland City University in 2001 and later earned a Master of Public Administration from Murray State University.

He identifies as a Baptist.

== Political career ==
Williams first ran for Kentucky's 4th House district in 2022 after redistricting moved the district's incumbent, Republican Lynn Bechler, into the 12th district. Bechler sought reelection there against fellow incumbent Jim Gooch.

== Electoral history ==
Williams received the Republican nomination without a primary vote in 2024 and 2026.

=== 2022 ===
Kentucky House District 4 Republican primary, May 17, 2022
Party	Candidate	Votes	%
Republican	Wade Williams	1,665	66.6
Republican	David L. Sharp	835	33.4
Total votes		2,500	100.0

Kentucky House District 4 general election, November 8, 2022
Party	Candidate	Votes	%
Republican	Wade Williams	10,624	72.0
Democratic	Byron L. Hobgood	4,140	28.0
Total votes		14,764	100.0

=== 2024 ===
Kentucky House District 4 general election, November 5, 2024
Party	Candidate	Votes	%
Republican	Wade Williams (incumbent)	15,338	75.4
Democratic	Lloyd Smith	5,008	24.6
Total votes		20,346	100.0

=== 2026 ===
Kentucky House District 4 general election, November 3, 2026 (unofficial results)
Party	Candidate	Votes	%
Republican	Wade Williams (incumbent)	10,304	100.0
Total votes		10,304	100.0

Kentucky House of Representatives
Preceded by Lynn Bechler	Member of the Kentucky House of Representatives; 2023–present	Succeeded by incumbent
