= Mike Cherry (Kentucky politician) =

American politician (1943–2024)

Member of the Kentucky House of Representatives from the 4th district
- In office January 1, 1999 – January 1, 2013
- Preceded by: Kathy Hogancamp
- Succeeded by: Lynn Bechler

Personal details
- Born: February 6, 1943 Princeton, Kentucky, U.S.
- Died: February 21, 2024 (aged 81) Dawson Springs, Kentucky, U.S.
- Party: Democratic
- Education: Murray State University (BS); University of Louisville (MS)

Mike Cherry (February 6, 1943 – February 21, 2024) was an American politician from Kentucky who was a member of the Kentucky House of Representatives from 1999 to 2013. Cherry was first elected in 1998 after Republican incumbent Kathy Hogancamp retired to unsuccessfully run for the Kentucky Senate. He did not seek reelection in 2012 and was succeeded by Republican Lynn Bechler. Cherry died in Dawson Springs, Kentucky, on February 21, 2024, at the age of 81.
