= W.W. Kington House =

- W. W. Kington House
- U.S. National Register of Historic Places
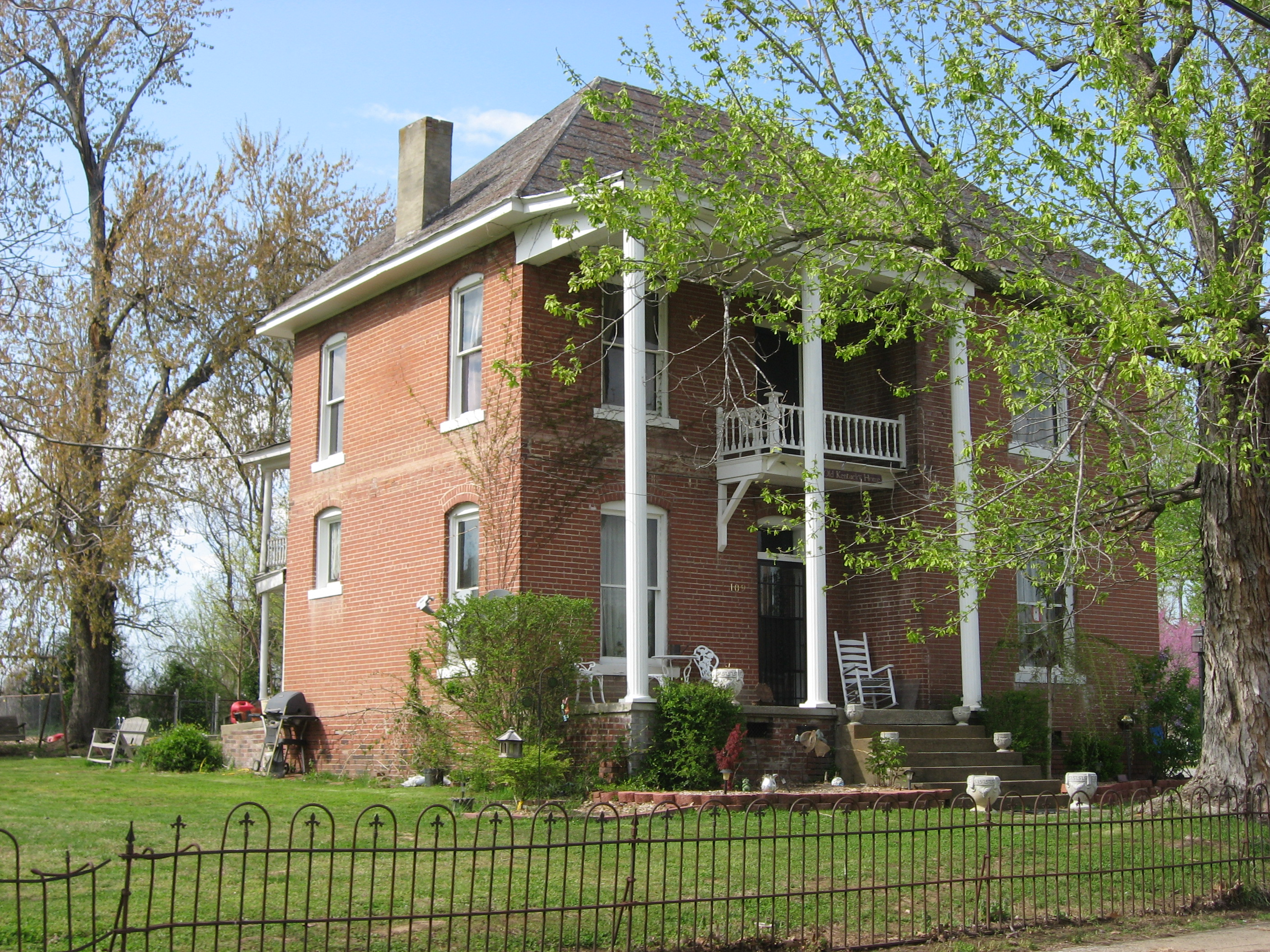

- Location within Kentucky
- Location: 109 Crooked St., Mortons Gap, Kentucky
- Coordinates: 37°14′24″N 87°28′22″W
- Area: less than one acre
- Built: 1911
- Architectural style: Italianate
- MPS: Hopkins County MPS
- NRHP reference No.: 88002724
- Added to NRHP: December 13, 1988

The W. W. Kington House, at 109 Crooked Street in Mortons Gap, Kentucky, is a historic house built in 1911. It was listed on the National Register of Historic Places on December 13, 1988, and is part of the Hopkins County Multiple Property Submission (MPS).

== History ==
The W. W. Kington House has elements of Italianate style and is one of few early brick houses built in Mortons Gap. The listing included the house and a contributing structure: an original hoop and dart cast-iron fence along the sidewalk.

It was deemed "significant for its association with prominent county coal miner W. W. Kington (William Ward Kington). The house was constructed around 1911 after his purchase of the property and Kington resided here until the house was sold in 1925. His residence is the only home still standing in the Morton's Gap area associated with prominent coal mine operators of the early 20th century. Kington was born near Mortons Gap in 1861 and worked in the mines at an early age. In 1901, Kington established the Kington and Wolf Coal Company and in 1907 he formed the Kington Coal Company which operated extensive mines at Mortons Gap. This mine had production of 1,500 tons per day and employed 350 workers at the height of its operation. In 1920, he reorganized his business as the Kington Coal Mining Company and continued to operate area mines into the 1920s. In addition to his mining operations, Kington organized the Planters Bank of Mortons Gap in 1907 and was also president of the Mortons Gap Ice and Light Company."

== See also ==
- National Register of Historic Places listings in Hopkins County, Kentucky
