= Lynn Bechler =

American politician

Member of the Kentucky House of Representatives from the 4th district
- In office January 1, 2013 – January 1, 2023
- Preceded by: Mike Cherry
- Succeeded by: Wade Williams

Personal details
- Born: April 18, 1946 (age 80)
- Party: Republican
- Education: Saint Louis University (BS)

Clifford Lynn Bechler (born April 18, 1946) is a U.S. politician and a Republican who was a member of the Kentucky House of Representatives from 2013 to 2023, representing district 4. Bechler was first elected in 2012 following the retirement of incumbent representative Mike Cherry. In 2022 he was redistricted into the 12th district and lost renomination to fellow representative Jim Gooch Jr. In 2024, Bechler unsuccessfully ran for the 1st district in the Kentucky Senate.

== Education ==
Bechler earned his BS in aerospace engineering from Saint Louis University.

== Elections ==
- 2010: To challenge incumbent Representative Mike Cherry, Bechler was unopposed for the May 18, 2010, Republican Primary, but lost the November 2, 2010, general election to Cherry.
- 2012: When District 4 Democratic Representative Mike Cherry left the Legislature and left the seat open, Bechler was unopposed for the May 22, 2012, Republican Primary and won the November 6, 2012, general election with 10,114 votes (56.9%) against Democratic nominee Raymond Giannini.
