= Zion Brick Missionary Church =

Historic church in Kentucky, United States

- U.S. National Register of Historic Places
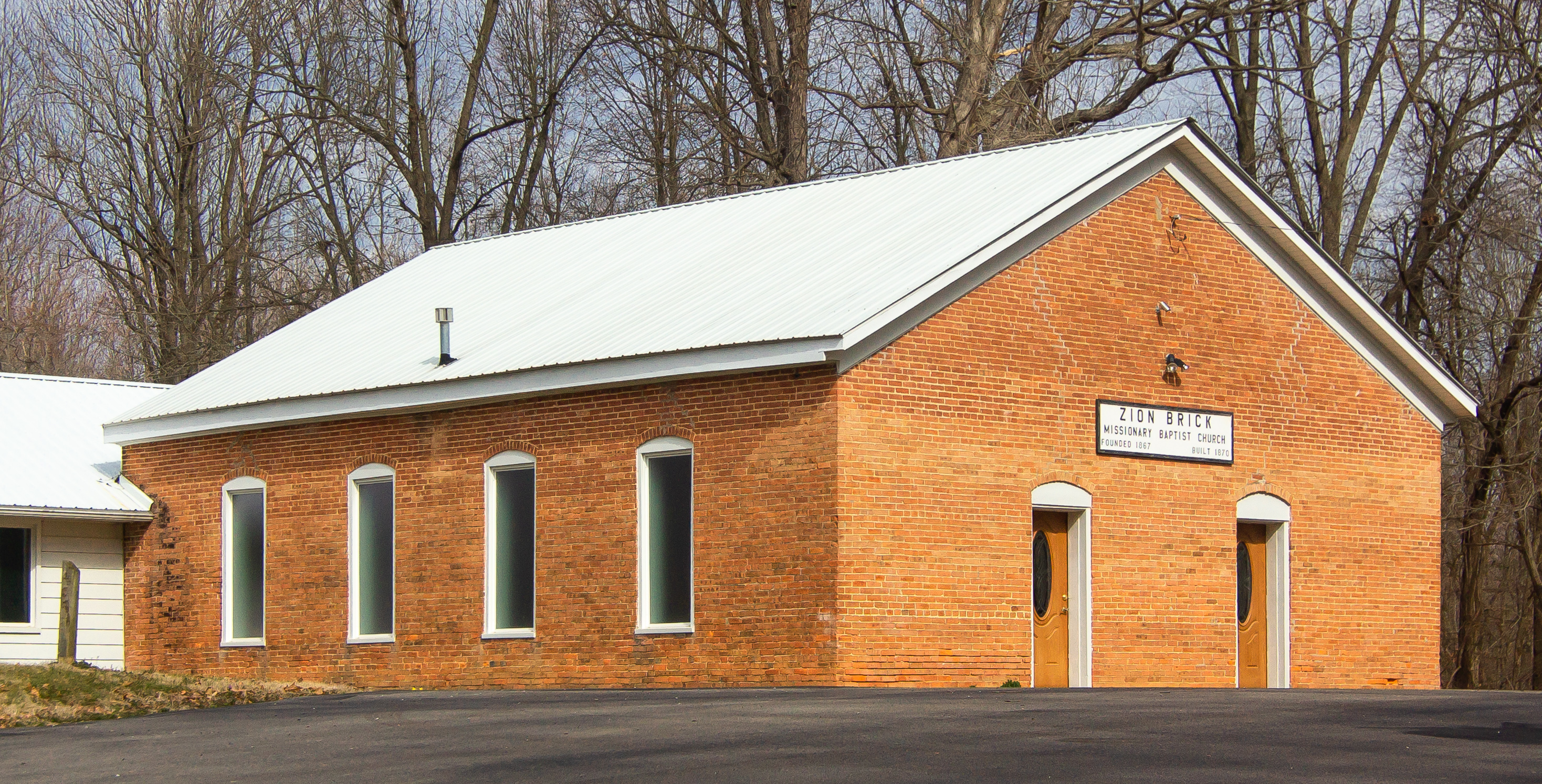

- Location within Kentucky Location within the United States
- Location: Zion Brick Church Road (formerly Crossroad Chapel Rd.), 0.3 miles north of its junction with Kentucky Route 138, near Hanson, Kentucky
- Coordinates: 37.499186°N 87.479442°W
- Area: less than one acre
- Built: 1870, c.1940
- Architectural style: Italianate, Vernacular Italianate
- MPS: Hopkins County MPS
- NRHP reference No.: 88002716
- Added to NRHP: December 13, 1988

The Zion Brick Missionary Church is a historic church in Hopkins County, Kentucky near Hanson. It is located on Zion Brick Church Road, formerly Crossroad Chapel Rd., .3 miles (0.48 km) north of its junction with Kentucky Route 138. It was built in 1870 and added to the National Register of Historic Places in 1988.

The church was organized in 1867. Its building is a one-story brick structure built in 1870 with brick laid in six-course common bond. A one-story frame addition was added to at the rear, around 1940.

It is "the oldest standing Baptist Church in the county and its only example of rural brick church architecture."
