= Daniel Boone, Kentucky =

Unincorporated community in Kentucky, United States

- Unincorporated community
- Location within Kentucky Location within the United States
- Coordinates: 37°10′43″N 87°30′27″W
- Country: United States
- State: Kentucky
- County: Hopkins
- Elevation: 505 ft (154 m)
- Time zone: UTC-6 (Central (CST))
  - Summer (DST): UTC-5 (CST)
- GNIS feature ID: 507811

Daniel Boone is an unincorporated community and coal town in Hopkins County, Kentucky, United States.

== Geography ==
The community was named for Daniel Boone, the famous Kentucky frontier hero. It is located in southern Hopkins county between St Charles and Nortonville.

== Mine ==
The community was home to a coal mine owned by the Sterling Coal Company that operated during the first half of the 20th century. In 1941, a serious explosion occurred at the mine, which at that point employed 125 men. 15 miners were missing after the explosion. The miners were later found dead and their bodies were brought to the surface via an air shaft. 38 men were rescued from the mine. At the time of the accident, the mine operated as a slope mine and had a daily output of 12-15 carloads of coal.

The community was on the United Mine Worker's 1916 list of places to stay away from.
