= Hotel Earlington =

- U.S. National Register of Historic Places
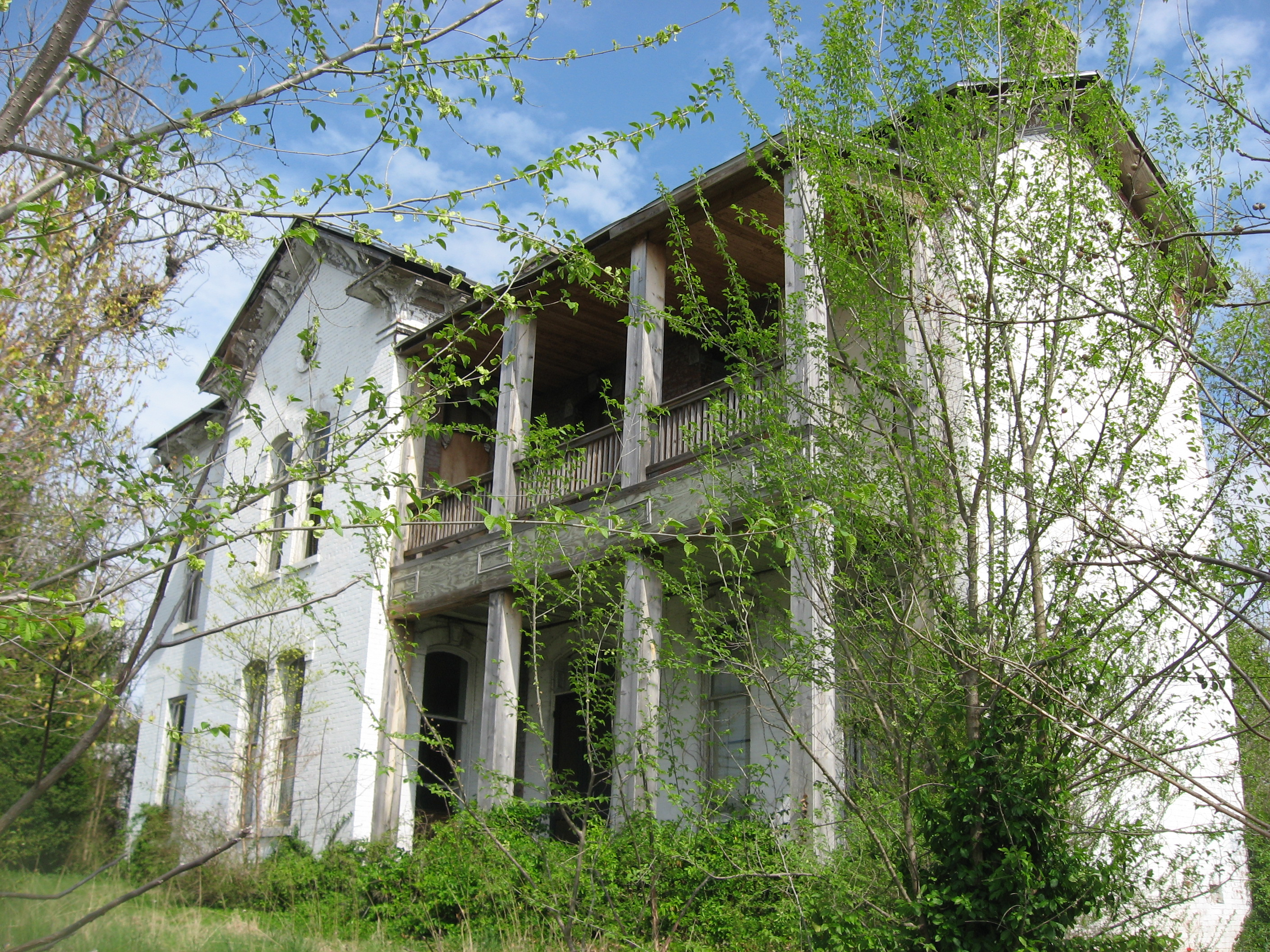

- Location within Kentucky
- Location: 118 E. Main St., Earlington, Kentucky
- Coordinates: 37°16′28″N 87°30′41″W
- Area: less than one acre
- Built: 1880, 1890s
- Architectural style: Italianate
- MPS: Hopkins County MPS
- NRHP reference No.: 88002725
- Added to NRHP: December 13, 1988

Hotel Earlington, at 118 E. Main St. in Earlington, Kentucky, dated from 1890. It was listed on the National Register of Historic Places in 1988.

It was a two-story Italianate-style building, built in 1880 and serving as a house for Thomas McEuen until 1885. It was modified to serve as a hotel in the 1890s.

It was deemed significant as the largest hotel in Earlington from its era, and as "one of the few remaining structures associated with the early commerce of the town and [as] the only relatively unaltered 19th century hotel standing in the county."

It was demolished in January 2021, after an attempt to renovate was unsuccessful.
