= Cranor School =

- U.S. National Register of Historic Places
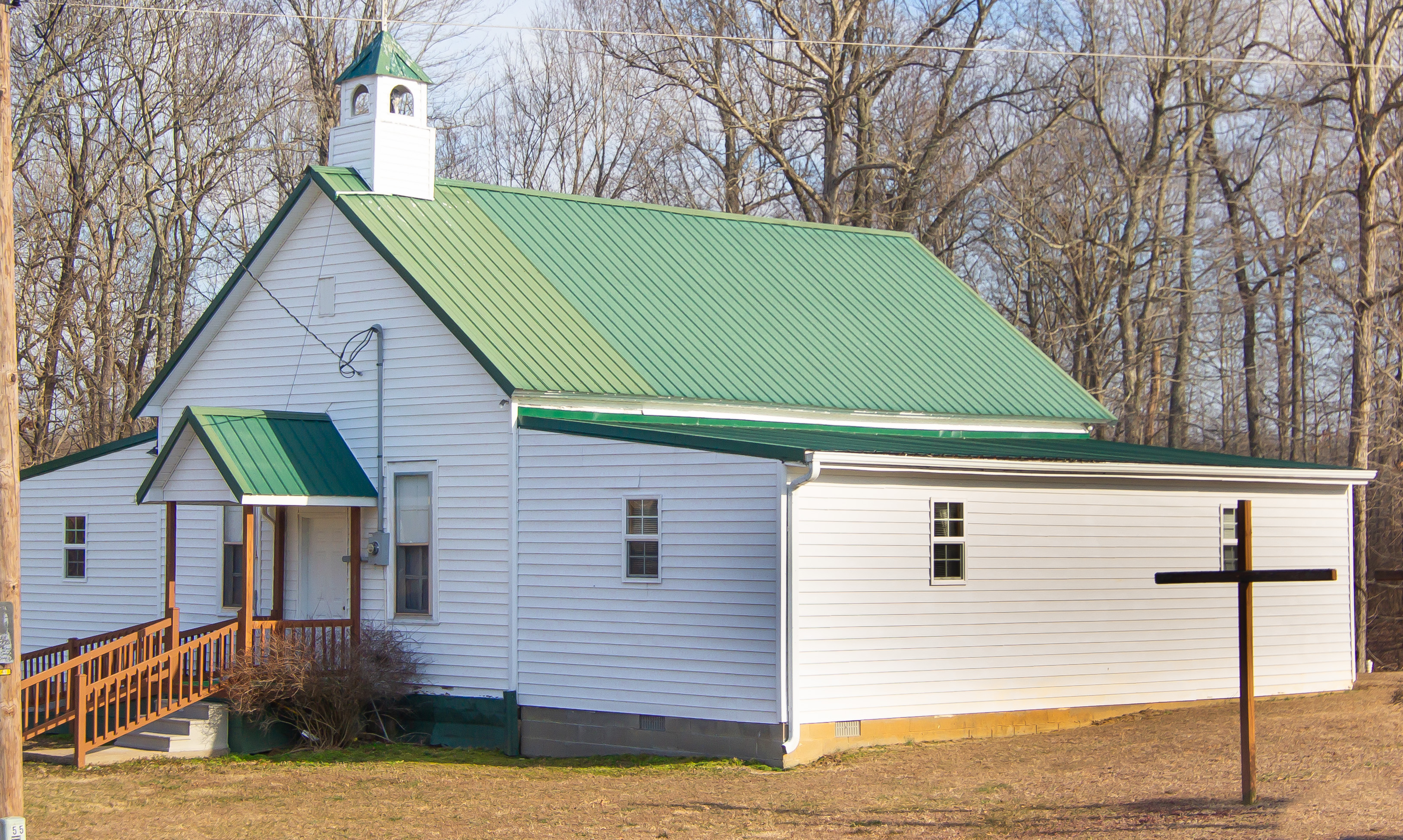
- Location: Buttermilk Rd., 0.2 miles southeast of its junction with Hamby Rd., near St. Charles, Kentucky
- Coordinates: 37°07′46″N 87°35′09″W
- Area: less than one acre
- Built: 1914
- Architectural style: Catalogue House
- MPS: Hopkins County MPS
- NRHP reference No.: 88002721
- Added to NRHP: March 8, 1989

Cranor School, in a rural area near St. Charles, Kentucky, was built in 1914. It was listed on the National Register of Historic Places in 1989. It is a one-story gable-front frame building. A combination coal shed and privy stands to the rear of the property. After the building was sold by the school system in the 1940s, it was used as community center and church.
