= Sixth Vein, Kentucky =

Unincorporated community in Kentucky, United States

- Unincorporated community
- Location within Kentucky Location within the United States
- Coordinates: 37°15′5″N 87°40′20″W
- Country: United States
- State: Kentucky
- County: Hopkins
- Elevation: 505 ft (154 m)
- Time zone: UTC-6 (Central (CST))
  - Summer (DST): UTC-5 (CST)
- GNIS feature ID: 509067

Sixth Vein is an unincorporated community located in Hopkins County, Kentucky, United States. The site was home to the Sixth Vein mine which operated during the 1930s and 40s. On 18 March 1944 two men were killed at the Sixth Vein Mine in an explosion. A further three men were killed in an explosion at the mine in 1946.
