= Frederick Miller House =

Historic house in Kentucky, United States

- U.S. National Register of Historic Places
- Location: U.S. Route 62, 2.1 miles (3.4 km) west of White Plains, Kentucky
- Coordinates: 37°11′32″N 87°25′14″W
- Area: 2.8 acres (1.1 ha)
- Built: c.1850
- Architectural style: Double Cell
- MPS: Hopkins County MPS
- NRHP reference No.: 88002723
- Added to NRHP: December 13, 1988

The Frederick Miller House, near White Plains, Kentucky, was built c.1850. It was listed on the National Register of Historic Places in 1988.

It is a frame two-story double cell house with a central chimney. Its interior has a Greek Revival-style mantle.
