= Randy Henderson (politician) =

American politician (born 1956)

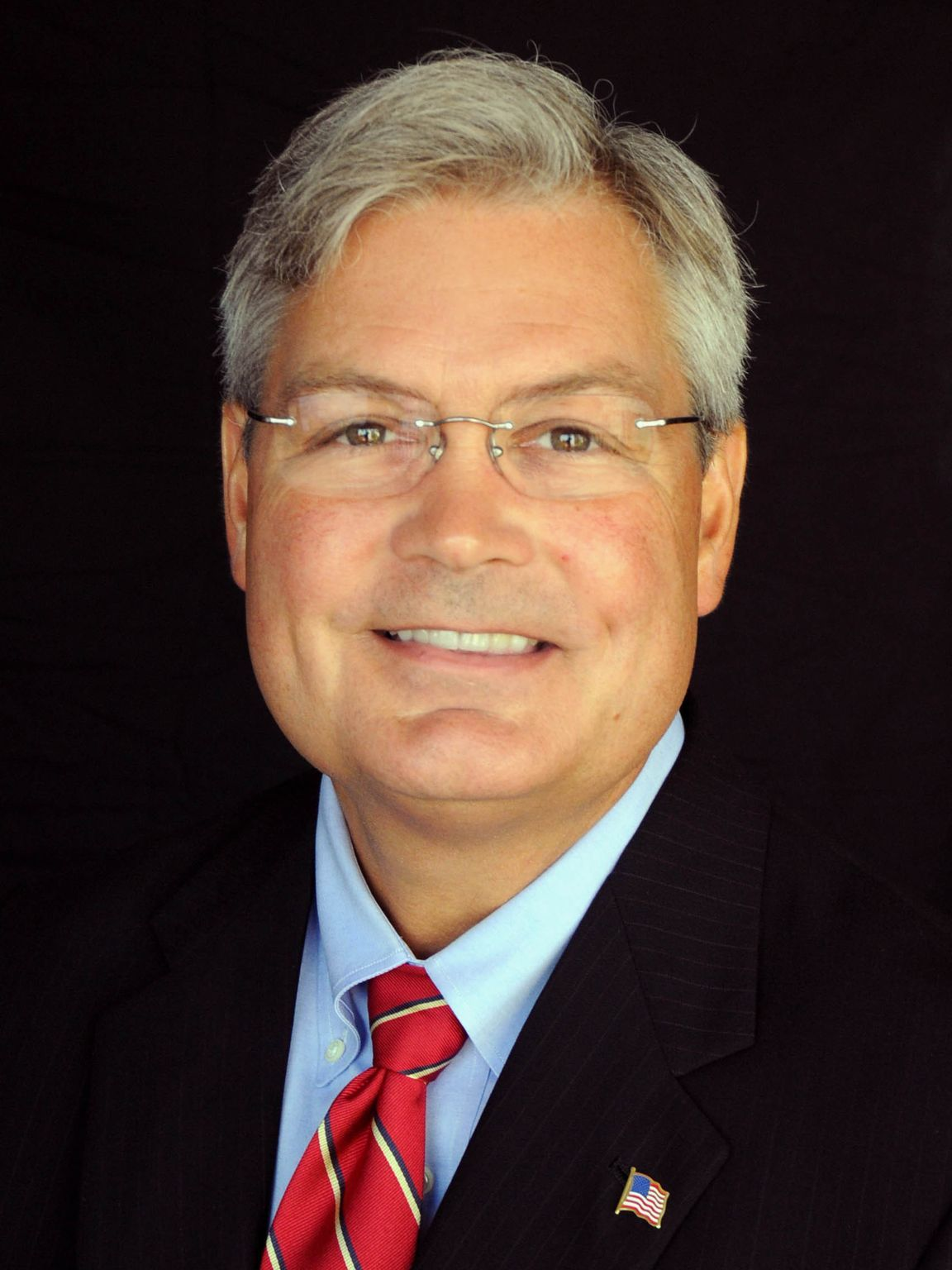

61st Mayor of Fort Myers
- In office November 16, 2009 – November 16, 2020
- Preceded by: James T. Humphrey
- Succeeded by: Kevin B. Anderson

Personal details
- Born: Randall Paul Henderson, Jr. August 3, 1956 (age 70) Winston-Salem, North Carolina, U.S.
- Spouse: Virginia Corbin Henderson
- Children: 3
- Relatives: Oscar M. Corbin Jr. (father-in-law)
- Education: Mars Hill College (BS)
- Occupation: Businessman, politician
- Website: Official campaign website

Randall Paul Henderson Jr. (born August 3, 1956) is an American real estate broker and politician who was Mayor of the City of Fort Myers, Florida from 2009 to 2020.

== Early years ==
Henderson was born and raised in North Carolina. He graduated in 1975 from Asheboro High School in Asheboro, North Carolina, where he played football, baseball, and basketball. He was named most outstanding football player in 1974 (known as Mr. Blue Comet), and his 1975 baseball team won the Western North Carolina High School Activities Association (WNCHSAA) championship. He was inducted into the Asheboro High School Athletic Hall of Fame in 2011.

Henderson attended Mars Hill College with an athletic scholarship, where he played football and was a four-year letterman for the baseball team. He graduated in 1979 with a BS in business administration.

== Business career ==
Henderson's career in Fort Myers began in banking, where he worked his way up to vice-president. He left banking in 1986 and assumed operating responsibilities for Corbin Henderson Company, a real estate firm, as president.

== Mayor of Fort Myers ==
Henderson was elected Mayor of Fort Myers in 2009, and reelected in 2013 and 2017.

In November 2020, Henderson resigned as mayor to run in that year's election to represent Florida's 19th congressional district. He was defeated in the Republican primary for the seat, finishing fifth.

== Community affairs ==
Henderson has been involved in community affairs for years serving on the following boards:

=== Current affiliations ===
Edison Pageant of Light	Advisory Board Member
Salvation Army	Advisory Board Member
First Community Bank	Director
Fort Myers Kiwanis Club	Member
First United Methodist Church	Member
Lee County Horizon Council	Member
President's Council of Hodges University	Member
Uncommon Friends Foundation	Member

=== Former Service ===
Fort Myers American Little League	Coach/Manager for 14 years
NCNB National Bank, Fort Myers	Director
First National Bank of Fort Myers	Director
Salvation Army Advisory Board	Chairman
City of Fort Myers Conference and Convention Council	Chairman
Greater Fort Myers Chamber of Commerce	Past President
Fort Myers Kiwanis Club	Past President
City of Fort Myers Conference and Convention Council	Advisory Board Member
Edison Community College Foundation	Advisory Board Member
Mars Hill College Advisory Board	Member

== Personal life ==
Henderson met Virginia Ann Corbin, daughter of former Fort Myers mayor Oscar Corbin Jr., at Mars Hill College. They were married at the First United Methodist Church in Fort Myers and have three children, Laura, Marcus, and Alex.

Henderson is a private pilot and enjoys flying both for business and personal pleasure. He enjoys time with family and is an avid fisherman.

== Electoral history ==
=== Fort Myers Mayor Elections ===
==== 2009 ====
2009 Fort Myers Mayoral Primary Election
Party	Candidate	Votes	%
Nonpartisan	Randy Henderson	1,777	57.2%
Nonpartisan	Jenna Persons	1,026	33.0%
Nonpartisan	Darrell Gardner	306	9.8%
Total votes		3,109	100.0%

==== 2013 ====
2013 Fort Myers Mayoral Primary Election
Party	Candidate	Votes	%
Nonpartisan	Randy Henderson	6,006	83.78%
Nonpartisan	Raimond Aulen	1,163	16.22%
Total votes		7,169	100.0%

==== 2017 ====
2017 Fort Myers Mayoral Primary Election
Party	Candidate	Votes	%
Nonpartisan	Randy Henderson	4,073	70.70%
Nonpartisan	Curtis Sheard	1,000	17.36%
Nonpartisan	Nicole Dillon	688	11.94%
Total votes		5,761	100.0%

=== U.S. House of Representatives Elections ===
==== 2020 ====
2020 Florida's 19th congressional district Republican primary results
Party	Candidate	Votes	%
Republican	Byron Donalds	23,492	22.6%
Republican	Dane Eagle	22,715	21.9%
Republican	Casey Askar	20,774	20.0%
Republican	William Figlesthaler	19,075	18.3%
Republican	Randy Henderson	7,858	7.6%
Republican	Christy McLaughlin	4,245	4.1%
Republican	Dan Severson	3,197	3.1%
Republican	Darren Aquino	1,466	1.4%
Republican	Daniel Kowal	1,135	1.1%
Total votes		103,957	100.0%

== See also ==
- List of mayors of Fort Myers, Florida
