= Anton, Kentucky =

Unincorporated community in Kentucky, United States

- Unincorporated community
- Location within Kentucky Location within the United States
- Coordinates: 37°21′07″N 87°23′41″W
- Country: United States
- State: Kentucky
- County: Hopkins
- Elevation: 407 ft (124 m)
- Time zone: UTC-6 (Central (CST))
  - Summer (DST): UTC-5 (CST)
- GNIS feature ID: 507405

Anton is an unincorporated community located in Hopkins County, Kentucky, United States.
