= Kathy Hogancamp =

American politician

Member of the Kentucky House of Representatives from the 4th district
- In office January 1, 1995 – January 1, 1999
- Preceded by: Rex Smith
- Succeeded by: Mike Cherry

Personal details
- Born: June 19, 1954
- Died: October 21, 2022 (aged 68)
- Party: Republican

Kathy Jan Hogancamp (June 19, 1954 – October 21, 2022) was an American politician from Kentucky who was a member of the Kentucky House of Representatives from 1995 to 1999. Hogancamp was first elected in 1994 after incumbent representative Rex Smith retired. In 1998 she unsuccessfully ran for the Kentucky Senate, losing to Democratic incumbent Bob Leeper.

Hogancamp died in October 2022 at age 68.
