= Rex Smith (politician) =

American politician (born 1957)

Member of the Kentucky House of Representatives from the 4th district
- In office January 1, 1987 – January 1, 1995
- Preceded by: Joel Ellington
- Succeeded by: Kathy Hogancamp

Personal details
- Born: January 29, 1957 (age 69)
- Party: Democratic

Calvin Rex Smith (born January 29, 1957) is an American politician from Kentucky who was a member of the Kentucky House of Representatives from 1987 to 1995. Smith was first elected in 1986 after incumbent representative Joel Ellington unsuccessfully ran for the Kentucky Senate. He did not seek reelection in 1994 and was succeeded by Republican Kathy Hogancamp. In 2010 he was the Democratic nominee for the 2nd senate district, losing to incumbent Bob Leeper.
