= Coiltown, Kentucky =

Unincorporated community in Kentucky, United States

- Unincorporated community
- Location within Kentucky Location within the United States
- Coordinates: 37°21′04″N 87°38′42″W
- Country: United States
- State: Kentucky
- County: Hopkins
- Elevation: 407 ft (124 m)
- Time zone: UTC-6 (Central (CST))
  - Summer (DST): UTC-5 (CST)
- GNIS feature ID: 489785

Coiltown is an unincorporated community located in Hopkins County, Kentucky, United States. The community likely took its name from W.D. Coil, who managed a local coal mine. The community is home to a rail junction, station, and coal mines.

In 2011 the community was the site of a suspected murder. Two residents of the community were arrested in connection with it in February 2012.
