= Fiddle Bow, Kentucky =

Unincorporated community in Kentucky, United States

- Unincorporated community
- Location within Kentucky Location within the United States
- Coordinates: 37°16′18″N 87°39′29″W
- Country: United States
- State: Kentucky
- County: Hopkins
- Elevation: 515 ft (157 m)
- Time zone: UTC-6 (Central (CST))
  - Summer (DST): UTC-5 (CST)
- GNIS feature ID: 507993

Fiddle Bow is an unincorporated community located in southwest Hopkins County, Kentucky, United States. It was populated as early as 1913. The town takes its name from a black oak tree that once lived in the area that had the appearance of a violin bow. A notorious highwayman, Micajah Harpe (AKA Big Harp), one of the Harpe brothers, was reputedly executed in the area.

== Mining and resource-extraction activity ==
Fiddle Bow was home to an underground coal mine owned by the Pittsburgh and Midway Coal Company. As of 1980 it had a production capacity of 250,000 tons a year. A strip mine was also located at Fiddle Bow with a production tonnage of 11,767 tons in 1980.

In 1986 water from an old mine created what locals dubbed the "Fiddle Bow Geyser", with water spraying more than 50 feet in the air from a vent pipe.

Oil was discovered at Fiddle Bow in 1968.
