= Charleston, Kentucky =

- Unincorporated community
- Location within Kentucky Location within the United States
- Coordinates: 37°13′29″N 87°40′19″W
- Country: United States
- State: Kentucky
- County: Hopkins
- Elevation: 531 ft (162 m)
- Time zone: UTC-6 (Central (CST))
  - Summer (DST): UTC-5 (CST)
- GNIS feature ID: 489364

Charleston is an unincorporated community in southwestern Hopkins County, Kentucky, United States.

According to legend, it was named for "Free Charles", a former slave, who kept a tavern there. A Charleston post office was in operation from 1855 to 1909.

On May 26, 2024, an EF3 tornado struck the community.
