= List of mayors of Fort Myers, Florida =

Mayor of Fort Myers
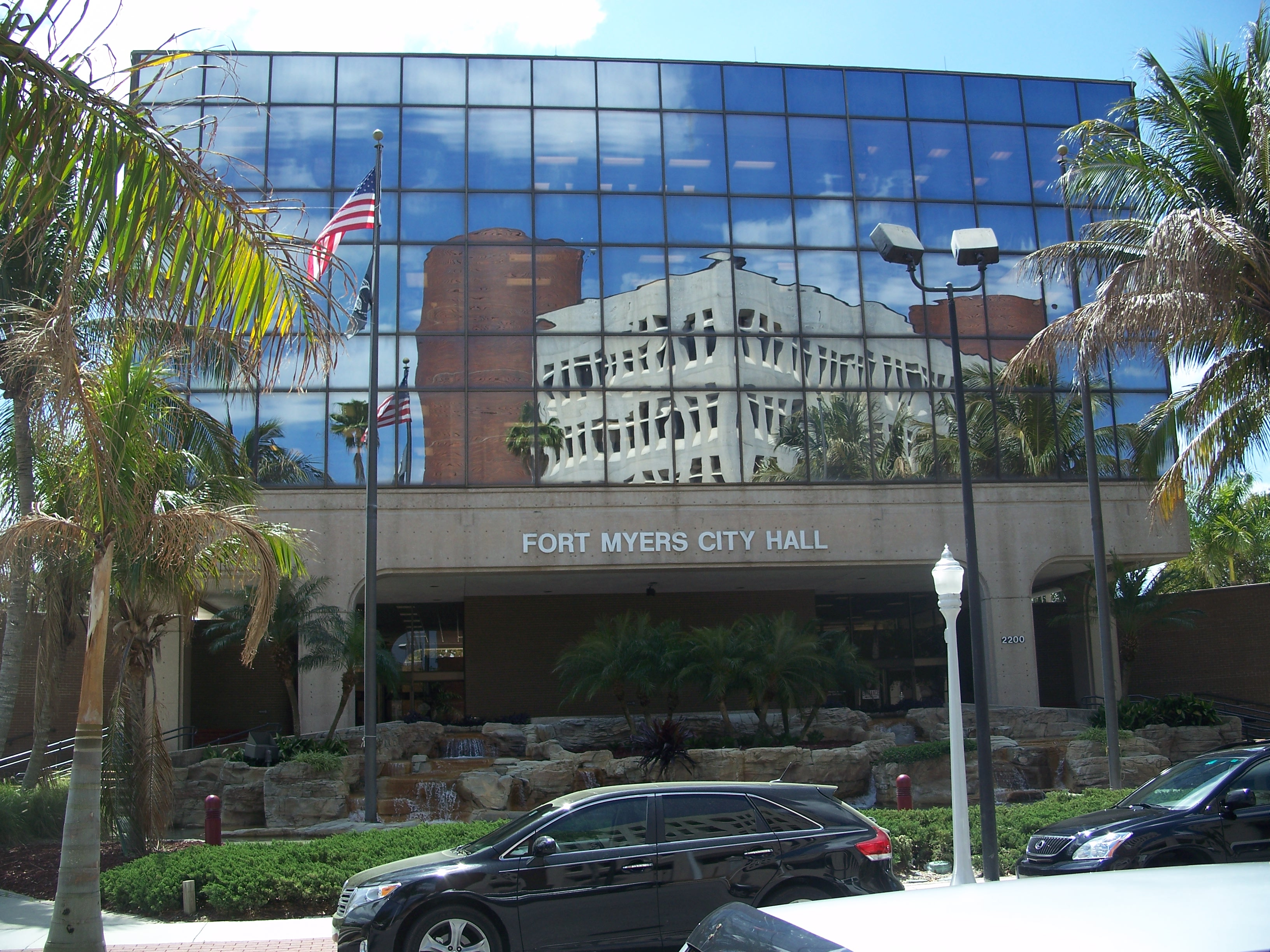
- Incumbent; Kevin Anderson since 2020
- Inaugural holder: Howell A. Parker
- Website: Official website

This is a list of people who have served as Mayor of the city of Fort Myers in the U.S. state of Florida.

== List of mayors of the City of Fort Myers ==
| No. | Term | Mayor |
|---|---|---|
| 62 | 2020–present | Kevin Anderson |
| 61 | 2009–2020 | Randall P. Henderson Jr. |
| 60 | 2000-2009 | James T. Humphrey |
| 59 | 1996-2000 | Bruce T. Grady |
| 58 | 1988-1996 | Wilbur C. Smith, III |
| 57 | 1984-1988 | Arthur N. Hamel |
| 56 | 1980-1984 | Ellis Solomon |
| 55 | 1976-1980 | Burl A. Underhill |
| 54 | 1967-1976 | Oscar M. Corbin, Jr. |
| 53 | 1962-1967 | Paul J. Myers |
| 52 | 1960-1962 | Edward Simpson |
| 51 | 1958-1960 | George M. French |
| 50 | 1951-1958 | Heard M. Edwards |
| 49 | 1950-1951 | Florence Fritz |
| 48 | 1948-1950 | Ernest Goodyear |
| 47 | 1947-1948 | R. E. Kurtz |
| 46 | 1945-1947 | Dave Shapard |
| 45 | 1940-1945 | Sam Fitzsimmons |
| 44 | 1935-1940 | David Shapard |
| 43 | 1933-1935 | Frank A. Whitney |
| 42 | 1930-1933 | Josiah H. Fitch |
| 41 | 1929-1930 | William J. Wood |
| 40 | 1928-1929 | Elmer Hough |
| 39 | 1927-1928 | H. E. Parnell |
| 38 | 1927-1927 | Clinton Bolick |
| 37 | 1926-1927 | Frank Kellow |
| 36 | 1925-1926 | O. M. Davison |
| 35 | 1924-1925 | A. E. Raymond |
| 34 | 1923-1924 | Vernon G. Widerquist |
| 33 | 1922-1923 | C. C. Pursley |
| 32 | 1921-1922 | Virgil Robb |
| 31 | 1920-1921 | C. Q. Stewart |
| 30 | 1919-1920 | C. L.Starnes |
| 29 | 1917-1918 | W. P. Franklin |
| 28 | 1916-1917 | L. G. Pope |
| 27 | 1915-1916 | D. W. Sumner |
| 26 | 1914-1915 | Louis A. Hendry |
| 25 | 1913-1914 | R. C. Matson |
| 24 | 1912-1913 | C. W. Carlton |
| 23 | 1911-1912 | Louis A. Henry |

== List of mayors of the Town of Fort Myers ==
| No. | Term | Name |
|---|---|---|
| 22 | 1910-1911 | Louis A. Henry |
| 21 | 1909-1910 | Robert Lilly |
| 20 | 1906-1908 | Henry A. Hendry |
| 19 | 1905-1906 | W. D. Bell |
| 18 | 1902-1904 | Louis A. Hendry |
| 17 | 1901-1902 | J. C. Jeffcott |
| 16 | 1900-1901 | Robert Lilly |
| 15 | 1899-1900 | Edward L. Evans |
| 14 | 1898-1899 | L. A. Hendry |
| 13 | 1897-1898 | J. L. Harn |
| 12 | 1896-1897 | Menendez Johnson |
| 11 | 1895-1896 | R. B. Leak |
| 10 | 1894-1895 | G. W. Kinnison |
| 9 | 1893-1894 | L. A. Hendry |
| 8 | 1892-1893 | J. L. Harn |
| 7 | 1891-1892 | L. G. Thorp |
| 6 | 1890-1891 | Howell A. Parker |
| 5 | 1889-1890 | W. H. Simmons |
| 4 | 1888-1889 | Howell A. Parker |
| 3 | 1887-1888 | W. W. Foos |
| 2 | 1886-1887 | Peter O. Knight |
| 1 | 1885-1886 | Howell A. Parker |
