= Hecla, Kentucky =

Unincorporated community in Kentucky, United States

- Unincorporated community
- Location within Kentucky Location within the United States
- Coordinates: 37°17′6″N 87°31′37″W
- Country: United States
- State: Kentucky
- County: Hopkins
- Elevation: 413 ft (126 m)
- Time zone: UTC-6 (Central (CST))
  - Summer (DST): UTC-5 (CST)
- GNIS feature ID: 493995

Hecla is an unincorporated community located in Hopkins County, Kentucky, United States. It was also called Hechla.

Hecla began as a company town where the workers of a mine operated by the Hecla Coal and Mining Company lived. The first mine opened there in 1873.
