= Grapevine, Kentucky =

Unincorporated community in Kentucky, United States

- Unincorporated community
- Location within Kentucky Location within the United States
- Coordinates: 37°18′00″N 87°29′9″W
- Country: United States
- State: Kentucky
- County: Hopkins
- Elevation: 515 ft (157 m)
- Time zone: UTC-6 (Central (CST))
  - Summer (DST): UTC-5 (CST)
- GNIS feature ID: 493126

Grapevine is an unincorporated community located in Hopkins County, Kentucky, United States.

== Grapevine Mine ==
During the 1920s the community hosted a coal mine. The mine continued operation into the 1950s under management of the Black Star Coal Company, and later the Sheffield and Coy Coal Company. In May 1958 the mine was the site of a fire that began under fallen material in an abandoned section of the mine. The mine was closed but subsequently re-opened under management of the Five Star Coal Company in 1962.
