= Beulah Lodge =

- U.S. National Register of Historic Places
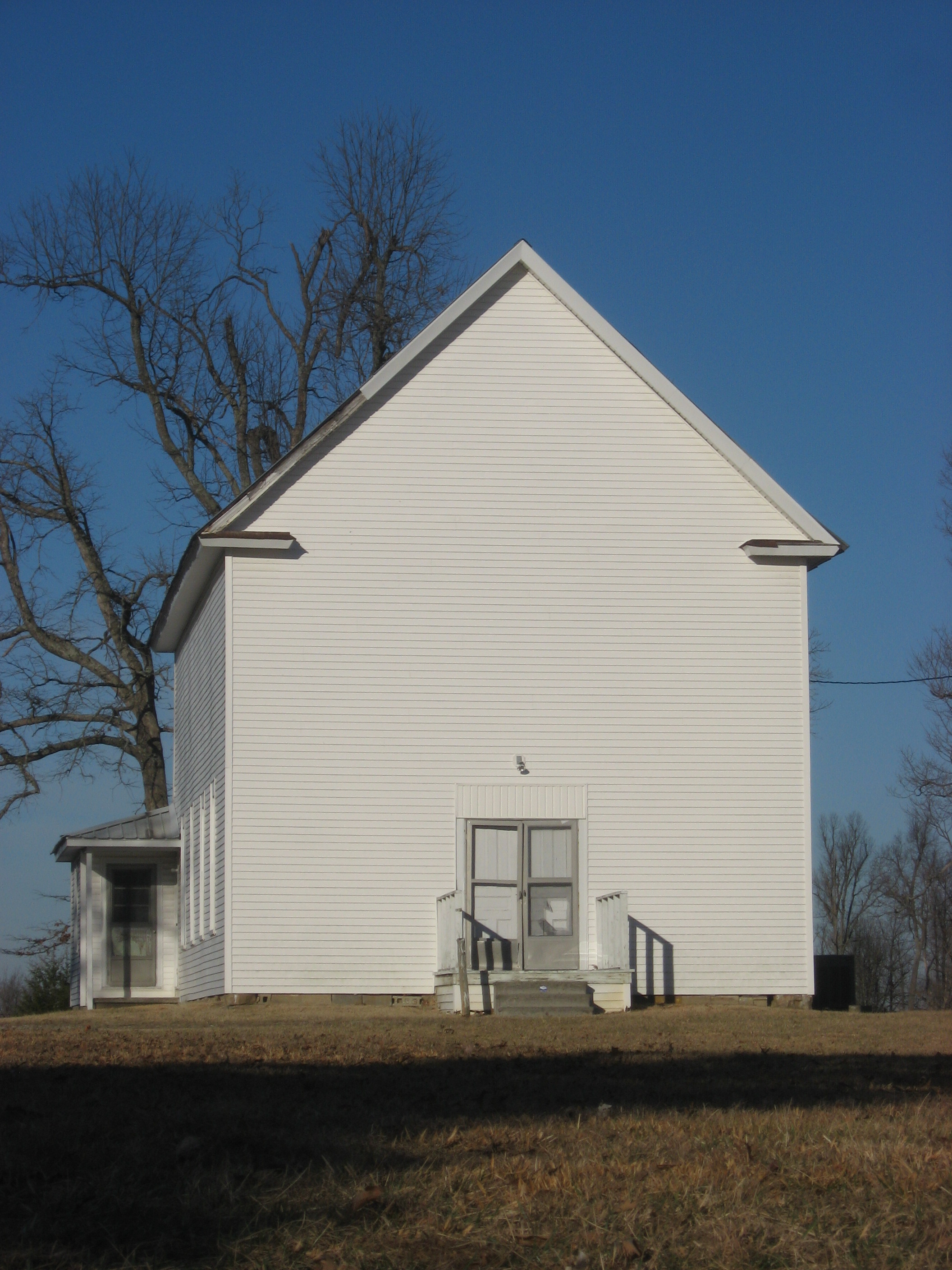
- Front of the Beulah Lodge

- Location within Kentucky Location within the United States
- Location: Kentucky Route 70, 0.5 miles west of its junction with Kentucky Route 109, near Dawson Springs, Kentucky
- Coordinates: 37°16′17″N 87°41′24″W
- Area: less than one acre
- Built: 1908
- Built by: Sisk, Amos
- Architectural style: Classical Revival
- MPS: Hopkins County MPS
- NRHP reference No.: 88002718
- Added to NRHP: March 8, 1989

Beulah Lodge, in the small community of Beulah near Dawson Springs, Kentucky, is a two-story frame structure built in 1908. A one-story rear addition was added in c.1940. It was listed on the National Register of Historic Places in 1989.

It was built in part as a meeting hall for the Beulah Lodge 609 F & AM (Free and Accepted Masons) (which, as of 2018 still uses the second floor as its lodge hall), and to serve as a worship space for the local community (its first floor has served various church congregations as a worship space).
