= Darby House (Dawson Springs, Kentucky) =

- The Darby House
- U.S. National Register of Historic Places
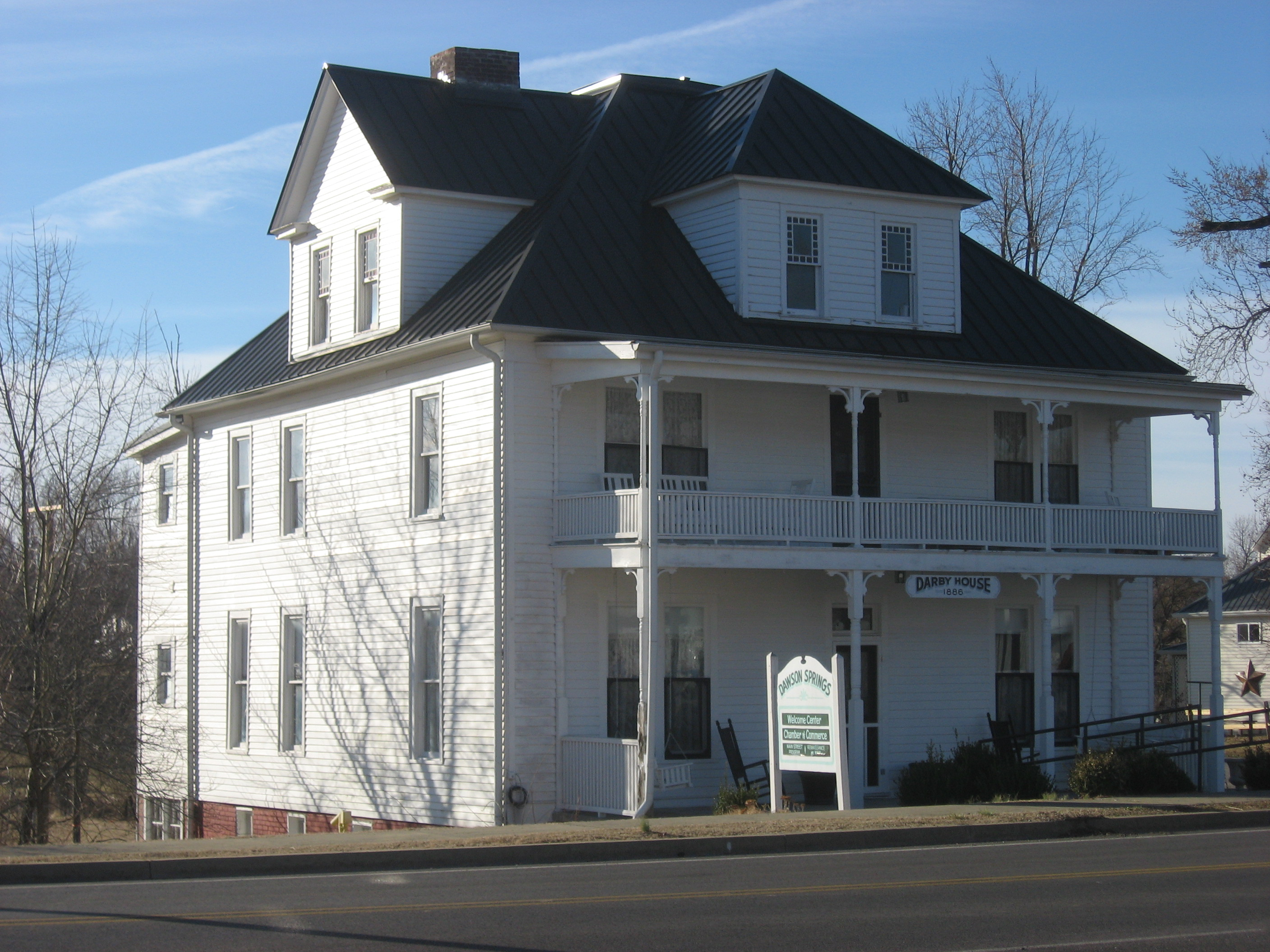

- Location within Kentucky Location within the United States
- Location: 301 W. Arcadia Ave., Dawson Springs, Kentucky
- Coordinates: 37°10′00″N 87°41′37″W
- Area: less than one acre
- Built: c.1890
- Architectural style: Late 19th and 20th Century Revivals
- NRHP reference No.: 97000871
- Added to NRHP: August 15, 1997

The Darby House, at 301 W. Arcadia Ave. in Dawson Springs, Kentucky was built around 1890. It was listed on the National Register of Historic Places in 1997.

It is a two-and-a-half-story hipped-roof 12-room Georgian Revival-style house, about 33 by 33 feet (10 m × 10 m) in plan. It was built by Dr. A. G. Darby and served as a boarding house and private residence.
