= E. H. Darby Lustron House =

Historic house in Alabama, United States

- U.S. National Register of Historic Places
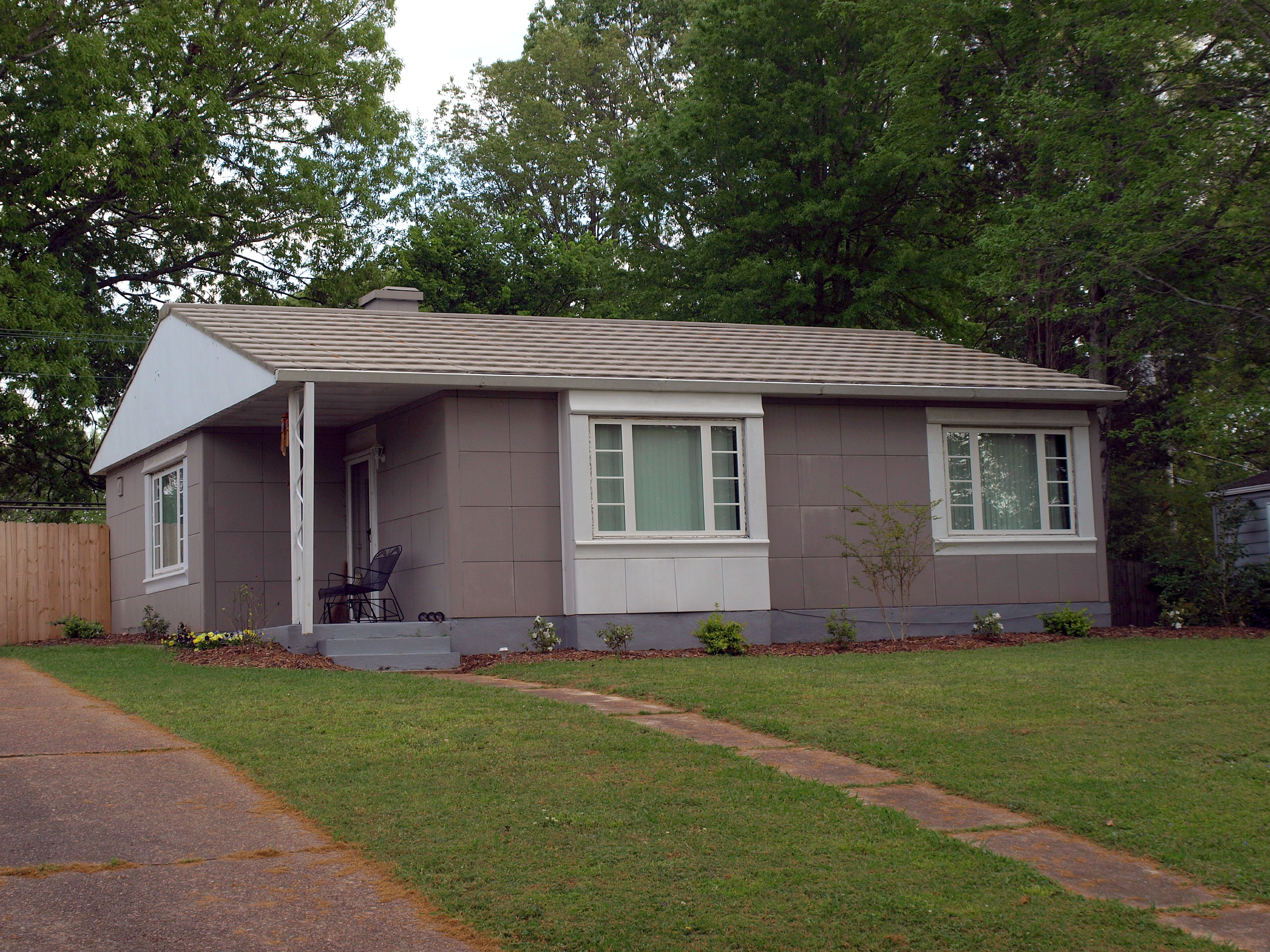
- The house in April 2017

- Location within Alabama Location within the United States
- Location: 321 Beverly, Florence, Alabama
- Coordinates: 34°47′22″N 87°41′18″W
- Area: less than one acre
- Built: 1949
- Built by: Lustron Corporation
- Architect: Koch, Carl and Associates
- Architectural style: Lustron house
- MPS: Lustron Houses in Alabama, MPS
- NRHP reference No.: 00000127
- Added to NRHP: February 24, 2000

The E. H. Darby Lustron House (also known as the Price Irons House) is a historic residence in Florence, Alabama. The house was built in 1949 by Elton H. Darby, one of the co-owners of Southern Sash, the Lustron house dealer in The Shoals. It is one of five remaining Lustron houses in the Shoals area and one of three in Florence. The prefabricated house has a side-gable roof covered with metal shingles. One corner of the house is recessed to form an entry porch. The house is clad in square porcelain enamel panels painted grey. The house is Lustron's two-bedroom Westchester Deluxe model, which features a shallow bay window in the living room. The house was listed on the National Register of Historic Places in 2000.
