= Jimmy Gooch =

Jimmy, Jim or James Gooch may refer to:

- Jimmy Gooch (footballer), English footballer
- Jim Gooch Jr., member of the Kentucky House of Representatives
- Jimmy Gooch (speedway rider) (1928–2011), speedway rider
- James Gooch (psychoanalyst)
- James Gooch, in Raid on Wells (1692)
