= Darby Plantation (New Iberia, Louisiana) =

Historic house in Louisiana, United States

- Formerly listed on the U.S. National Register of Historic Places
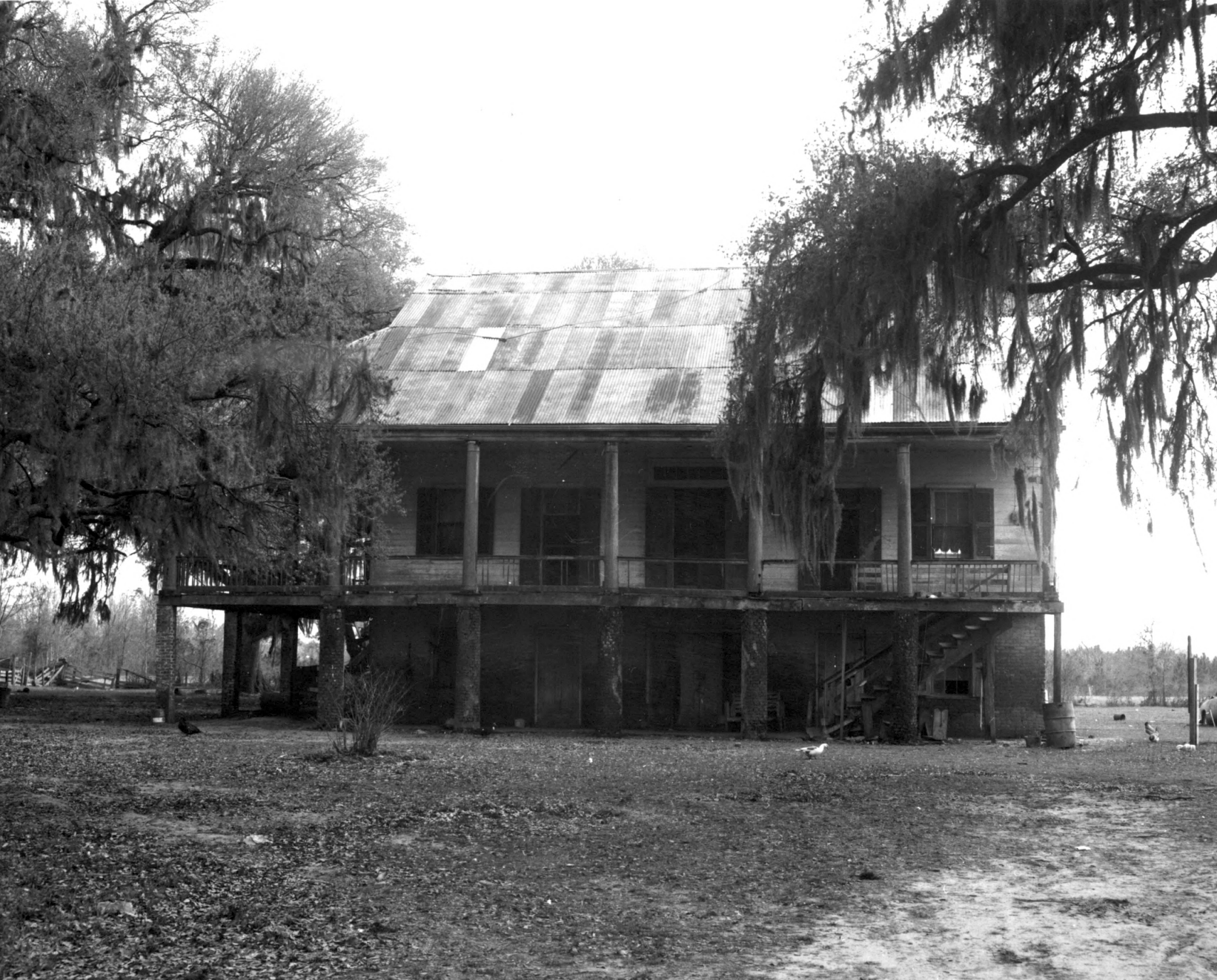
- Darby Plantation in 1968

- Location within Louisiana Location within the United States
- Location: Along Darby Lane, about 2.1 miles (3.4 km) northwest of downtown New Iberia
- Coordinates: 30°01′51″N 91°50′05″W
- Area: 5 acres (2.0 ha)
- Built: c.1815
- Architectural style: French Colonial, Louisiana Colonial, Central hall plan
- NRHP reference No.: 73000868

Significant dates
- Added to NRHP: March 26, 1973
- Removed from NRHP: January 31, 2019

The Darby Plantation was a Southern plantation located in what is now part of New Iberia, Louisiana 2.1 miles (3.4 km) northwest of downtown, but what was once a rural landscape. After the historic plantation housed burned down, a replica was built in its place.

== History ==
The Darby Plantation was founded by Jonathan Darby, an Englishman who immigrated from France in 1719. Francois inherited the Darby plantation from his father, Jean-Baptiste St. Marc Darby. It remained in family ownership for more than 150 years.

The house c. 1813 had two stories, with a central hall plan. The first story was solid brick; the second story was briquette-entre-poteaux, with full or broken brick filling spaces between heavy cypress posts. It was built between 1813 and 1820 for Francois St. Marc Darby and his wife, Felicite de St. Amant.

During mid 1970s, the already abandoned house, at that time it was property of Attakapas Historical Society, was completely destroyed by fire.

Around 2002, architect Perry Segura started building a replica of the mansion at its original place, while modifying its original appearance. The water cistern near the house was replaced by a three-car garage, the exterior stairs were moved inside the house, the porch which wrapped the house on three sides is present only on the front and the back, and dormers were added to the roof in order to let light enter attic space. The inside is also quite differently organized as living quarters are now located downstair. (Note: A reference to the "recent loss" of the mansion is present also in registration form for Dulcito Plantation House)

The mansion was listed on the National Register of Historic Places on March 26, 1973. The house was removed from the National Register of Historic Places list in January 2019.

== See also ==
- List of plantations in Louisiana
- National Register of Historic Places listings in Iberia Parish, Louisiana
