= White Plains, Kentucky =

- City
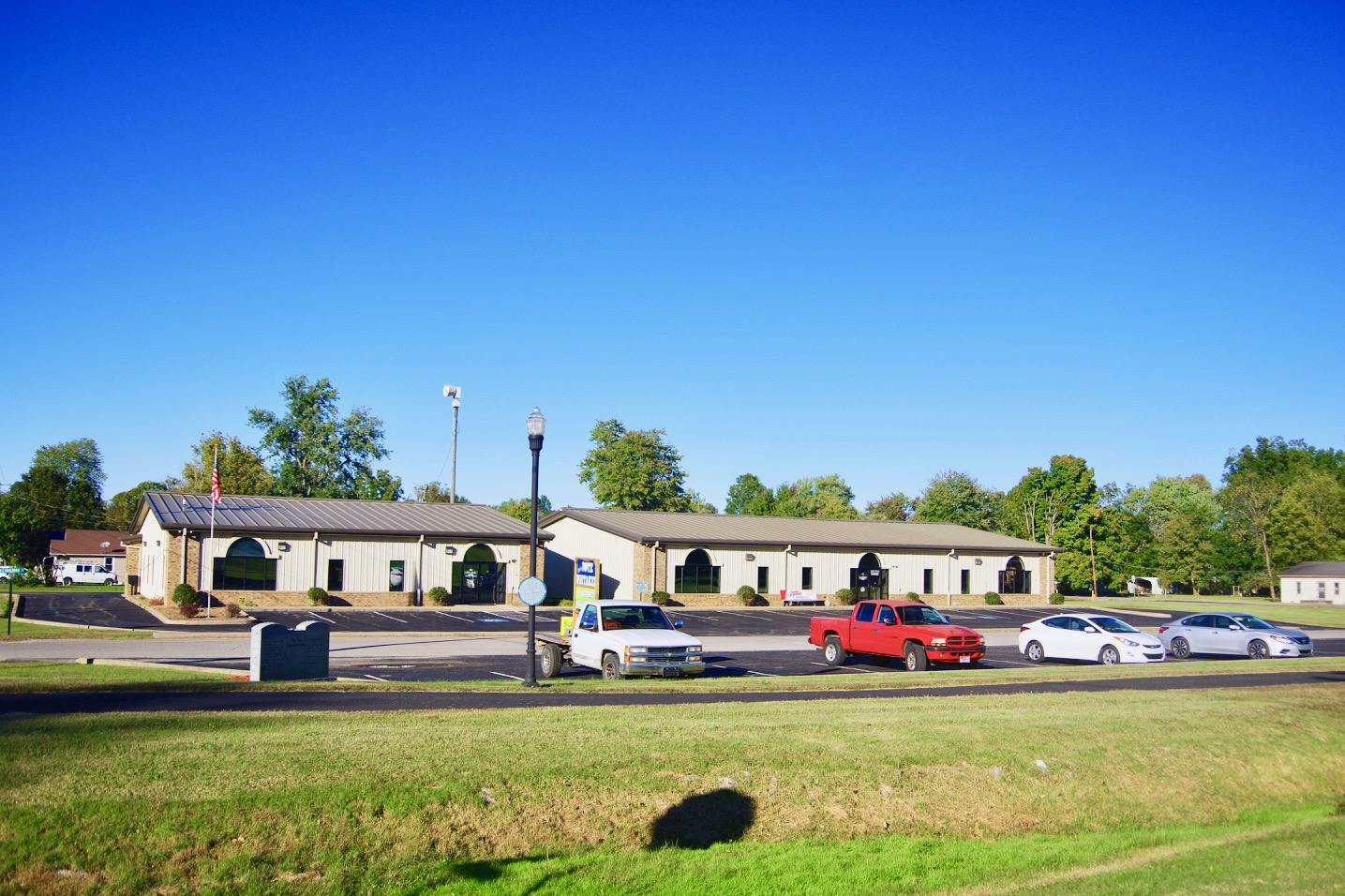
- City Hall
- Nickname: little prairie
- Location of White Plains in Hopkins County, Kentucky.
- Coordinates: 37°11′4″N 87°23′5″W
- Country: United States
- State: Kentucky
- County: Hopkins

Area
  - Total: 3.33 sq mi (8.62 km^{2})
  - Land: 3.25 sq mi (8.42 km^{2})
  - Water: 0.077 sq mi (0.20 km^{2})
- Elevation: 417 ft (127 m)

Population (2020)
  - Total: 829
  - Density: 254.9/sq mi (98.41/km^{2})
- Time zone: UTC-6 (Central (CST))
  - Summer (DST): UTC-5 (CDT)
- ZIP code: 42464
- Area codes: 270 & 364
- FIPS code: 21-82722
- GNIS feature ID: 0506635

White Plains is a home rule-class city in Hopkins County, Kentucky, United States. As of the 2020 census, White Plains had a population of 829.

== History ==
White Plains was established in 1853, and was originally known as "Little Prairie." With the arrival of the railroad in 1870, Little Prairie became the shipping point for a community then known as "White Plains" (modern Fruit Hill) further to the south in Christian County, and thus became known as "White Plains Station," or "New White Plains." When the postmaster of the Christian County community renamed it "Fruit Hill," the "New" was dropped from the name of the Hopkins County city.

== Geography ==
White Plains is located in southeastern Hopkins County at 37°11′4″N 87°23′5″W (37.184489, -87.384739). U.S. Route 62 passes through the northern part of the community, leading east 13 miles (21 km) to Greenville and west 4 miles (6 km) to Nortonville.

According to the United States Census Bureau, White Plains has a total area of 3.18 square miles (8.24 km^{2}), of which 3.11 square miles (8.05 km^{2}) are land and 0.07 square miles (0.19 km^{2}), or 2.34%, are water.

== Demographics ==
Historical population
Census	Pop.	Note	%±
1880	35		—
1890	59		68.6%
1900	200		239.0%
1910	281		40.5%
1920	315		12.1%
1930	350		11.1%
1940	382		9.1%
1950	385		0.8%
1960	359		−6.8%
1970	729		103.1%
1980	859		17.8%
1990	598		−30.4%
2000	800		33.8%
2010	884		10.5%
2020	829		−6.2%
U.S. Decennial Census

As of the census of 2000, there were 800 people, 295 households, and 225 families residing in the city. The population density was 298.6 inhabitants per square mile (115.3/km^{2}). There were 328 housing units at an average density of 122.4 per square mile (47.3/km^{2}). The racial makeup of the city was 98.25% White, 0.62% Black or African American, 0.25% Asian, 0.25% from other races, and 0.62% from two or more races. Hispanic or Latino of any race were 2.50% of the population.

There were 295 households, out of which 36.9% had children under the age of 18 living with them, 61.7% were married couples living together, 11.2% had a female householder with no husband present, and 23.4% were non-families. 22.4% of all households were made up of individuals, and 10.5% had someone living alone who was 65 years of age or older. The average household size was 2.71 and the average family size was 3.14.

In the city, the population was spread out, with 27.1% under the age of 18, 10.3% from 18 to 24, 29.5% from 25 to 44, 23.6% from 45 to 64, and 9.5% who were 65 years of age or older. The median age was 33 years. For every 100 females, there were 100.0 males. For every 100 females age 18 and over, there were 99.0 males.

The median income for a household in the city was $29,205, and the median income for a family was $32,321. Males had a median income of $30,833 versus $16,818 for females. The per capita income for the city was $13,187. About 20.3% of families and 23.6% of the population were below the poverty line, including 34.5% of those under age 18 and 20.8% of those age 65 or over.
