= St. Charles, Kentucky =

- City
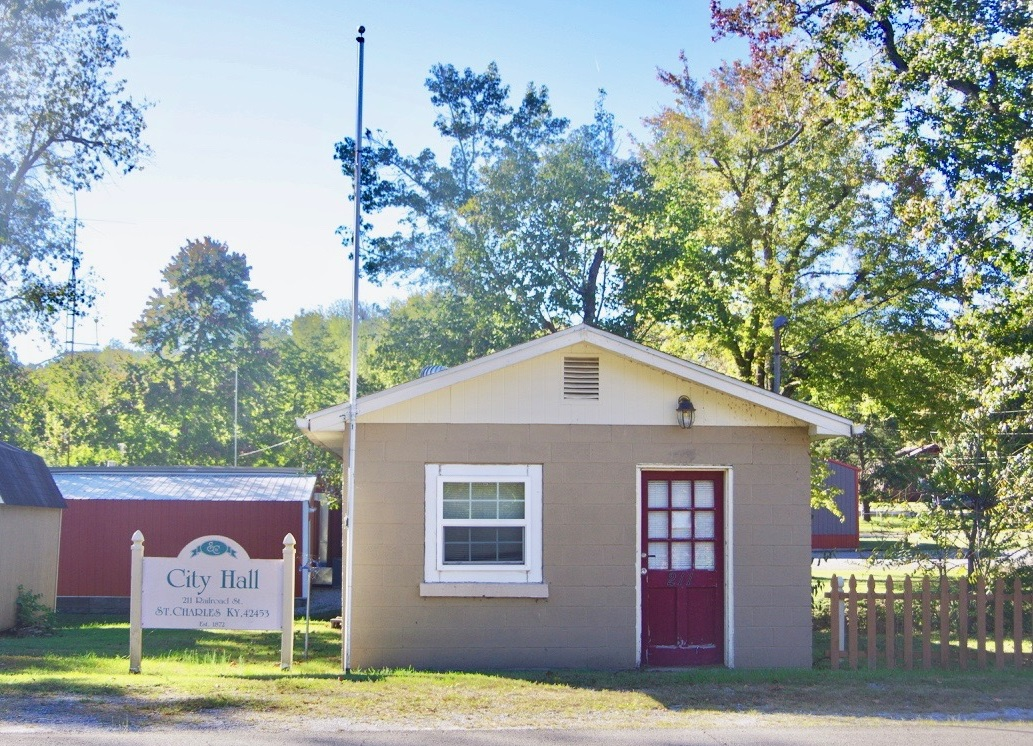
- City Hall

- Location of St. Charles in Hopkins County, Kentucky.
- Coordinates: 37°11′3″N 87°33′19″W
- Country: United States
- State: Kentucky
- County: Hopkins

Area
  - Total: 1.00 sq mi (2.59 km^{2})
  - Land: 0.99 sq mi (2.57 km^{2})
  - Water: 0.0077 sq mi (0.02 km^{2})
- Elevation: 440 ft (134 m)

Population (2020)
  - Total: 273
  - Density: 274.9/sq mi (106.15/km^{2})
- Time zone: UTC-6 (Central (CST))
  - Summer (DST): UTC-5 (CDT)
- ZIP code: 42453
- Area codes: 270 and 364
- FIPS code: 21-67710
- GNIS feature ID: 0502599

St. Charles is a home rule-class city in Hopkins County, Kentucky, United States. As of the 2020 census, St. Charles had a population of 273.

== History ==
St. Charles was settled as a coal mining camp in 1872 on land purchased from J.I.D. Woodruff by the Saint Bernard Mining Company. In 1873, the post office was established under the name "Woodruff", but when the city was incorporated in 1874, the name was changed to "St. Charles" for now unknown reasons.

== Geography ==
St. Charles is located in southern Hopkins County at 37°11′3″N 87°33′19″W (37.184139, -87.555164). U.S. Route 62 passes through the southern part of the community, leading east 6 miles (10 km) to Nortonville and west 8 miles (13 km) to Dawson Springs.

According to the United States Census Bureau, St. Charles has a total area of 1.0 square mile (2.6 km^{2}), of which 0.01 square miles (0.02 km^{2}), or 0.70%, are water.

== Demographics ==
Historical population
Census	Pop.	Note	%±
1880	356		—
1890	449		26.1%
1900	753		67.7%
1910	660		−12.4%
1920	604		−8.5%
1930	634		5.0%
1940	536		−15.5%
1950	534		−0.4%
1960	421		−21.2%
1970	373		−11.4%
1980	405		8.6%
1990	316		−22.0%
2000	309		−2.2%
2010	277		−10.4%
2020	273		−1.4%
U.S. Decennial Census

As of the census of 2000, there were 309 people, 120 households, and 90 families residing in the city. The population density was 538.0 inhabitants per square mile (207.7/km^{2}). There were 133 housing units at an average density of 231.6 per square mile (89.4/km^{2}). The racial makeup of the city was 98.71% White, 0.32% Pacific Islander, and 0.97% from two or more races.

There were 120 households, out of which 37.5% had children under the age of 18 living with them, 59.2% were married couples living together, 10.8% had a female householder with no husband present, and 24.2% were non-families. 21.7% of all households were made up of individuals, and 10.0% had someone living alone who was 65 years of age or older. The average household size was 2.58 and the average family size was 3.02.

In the city, the population was spread out, with 25.9% under the age of 18, 6.5% from 18 to 24, 32.7% from 25 to 44, 22.0% from 45 to 64, and 12.9% who were 65 years of age or older. The median age was 36 years. For every 100 females, there were 98.1 males. For every 100 females age 18 and over, there were 102.7 males.

The median income for a household in the city was $20,469, and the median income for a family was $20,000. Males had a median income of $21,875 versus $13,750 for females. The per capita income for the city was $10,230. About 26.1% of families and 29.2% of the population were below the poverty line, including 40.6% of those under the age of eighteen and 24.4% of those 65 or over.
