= Earlington, Kentucky =

- City
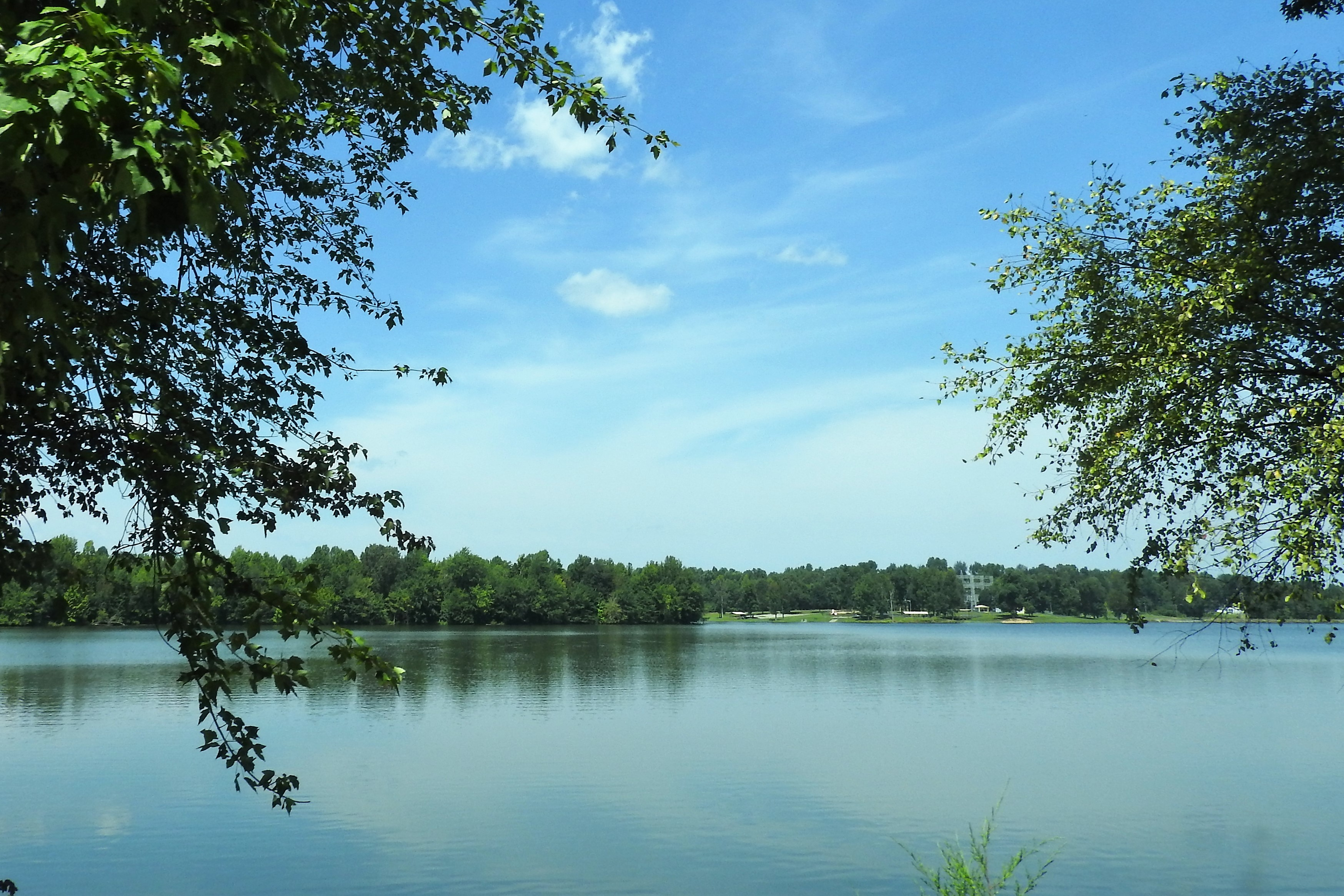
- Loch Mary Reservoir in Earlington

- Location of Earlington in Hopkins County, Kentucky.
- Coordinates: 37°16′27″N 87°30′41″W
- Country: United States
- State: Kentucky
- County: Hopkins

Area
  - Total: 2.94 sq mi (7.62 km^{2})
  - Land: 2.82 sq mi (7.31 km^{2})
  - Water: 0.12 sq mi (0.31 km^{2})
- Elevation: 423 ft (129 m)

Population (2020)
  - Total: 1,257
  - Density: 445.6/sq mi (172.04/km^{2})
- Time zone: UTC-6 (Central (CST))
  - Summer (DST): UTC-5 (CDT)
- ZIP code: 42410
- Area codes: 270 & 364
- FIPS code: 21-23230
- GNIS feature ID: 0491420
- Website: earlingtongovcity.com

Earlington is a home rule-class city in Hopkins County, Kentucky, in the United States. As of the 2020 census, Earlington had a population of 1,257.

== History ==
Founded in 1870 by the St. Bernard Coal Co., Earlington was named a year later, upon its incorporation, for John Baylis Earle, the man who stuck the first pick into the hillside at the opening of Hopkins County's first commercial coal mine. Earle was a lawyer who was central to developing the coal industry in the region. Shortly after the town was founded, the Louisville and Nashville Railroad completed its line from Henderson to Earlington, and became the primary hauler in the area. The town boomed as a coal center and as the center of L&N operations on the Evansville line.

The early development of Earlington can most readily be credited to St. Bernard Coal Company's second president, John B. Atkinson. Originally from New Jersey, Atkinson taught school before becoming a civil engineer. He relocated to Kentucky from Boston in 1871 to take charge of mining operations at Earlington and eventually became president of the company.

Because of his background in education, Atkinson placed a great deal of emphasis on schools in Earlington, and modern buildings for the grade schools and high schools were built and furnished at the expense of St. Bernard. Other amenities offered at Earlington included housing, a library, an arboretum, and churches. Unusual for Western Kentucky at the time was the firm's electric generating plant, which made Earlington one of the first fully electrified towns in the region.

Earlington boomed for its first 40 years, and was largely worked by black coal miners. Around World War I, consolidation in the mining industry sent coal company headquarters and profits to companies based in St. Louis, New York and other major cities, including the West Kentucky Coal Co. (based in New Jersey), which took over much of the Earlington operation. This drain of resources and severing of local control deeply affected Earlington and other mining towns nationwide, as did automation of many mining jobs. For Earlington, the closure of the L&N depot in the 1960s was another major blow.

Like many coal towns, Earlington's population has declined by more than half over the past century, particularly since the mines played out in the 1980s. Today, the sleepy town is primarily a local service center, with some trade to pass-through traffic along its I-69 interchange and its US 41 (Dixie Hwy.) commercial center.

== Education ==
Until the mid-1970s, the city of Earlington operated an independent school system. The system served students from the primary grades until high school graduation. In 1967, the Earlington Yellowjackets won the state "Sweet 16" basketball tournament. During the 1960s, the champions of the Sweet 16 were typically from Jefferson County (Louisville) or Fayette County (Lexington), the largest population centers in the state. Earlington remains one of the smallest schools ever to win the "Sweet 16" in the modern era. The team was coached by Bob Fox, who was a native of Earlington and played basketball for Earlington in the late 1940s. He amassed an impressive coaching record at Earlingon at 141-26 and was inducted into the KHSAA Hall of Fame in 2001.

When the city school board decided to merge with the Hopkins County School System, the community was divided. Half of the students were enrolled at South Hopkins High School, about 3 miles (5 km) to the south, and the others went to West Hopkins High School, 8 miles (13 km) to the west. The division was made along the railroad line that bisects the town.

Earlington also had a private school that operated until the 1970s. Immaculate Conception, the only Roman Catholic parish in Earlington and the oldest parish in Hopkins County, operated a school periodically from the 1890s until the school was closed because of the building's condition. The school had served students from kindergarten to the sixth grade. Located across the street from the parish building, the old school building has now been demolished.

== Geography ==
Earlington bordered to the north by Madisonville, the county seat. U.S. Route 41 (Hopkinsville Road) passes through the center of Earlington, leading north 4 miles (6 km) to the center of Madisonville and southeast 7 miles (11 km) to Nortonville.

According to the United States Census Bureau, Earlington has a total area of 2.5 square miles (6.5 km^{2}), of which 2.4 square miles (6.2 km^{2}) are land and 0.1 square miles (0.3 km^{2}), or 4.55%, are water.

== Demographics ==
Historical population
Census	Pop.	Note	%±
1880	907		—
1890	1,748		92.7%
1900	3,012		72.3%
1910	3,931		30.5%
1920	3,652		−7.1%
1930	3,309		−9.4%
1940	2,858		−13.6%
1950	2,753		−3.7%
1960	2,786		1.2%
1970	2,321		−16.7%
1980	2,011		−13.4%
1990	1,833		−8.9%
2000	1,649		−10.0%
2010	1,413		−14.3%
2020	1,257		−11.0%
U.S. Decennial Census

As of the census of 2000, there were 1,649 people, 681 households, and 439 families residing in the city. The population density was 493.1 inhabitants per square mile (190.4/km^{2}). There were 798 housing units at an average density of 238.6 per square mile (92.1/km^{2}). The racial makeup of the city was 75.80% White, 23.29% Black or African American, 0.18% Native American, 0.06% Asian, 0.06% Pacific Islander, 0.06% from other races, and 0.55% from two or more races. Hispanic or Latino of any race were 0.73% of the population.

There were 681 households, out of which 29.7% had children under the age of 18 living with them, 41.7% were married couples living together, 18.8% had a female householder with no husband present, and 35.5% were non-families. 31.6% of all households were made up of individuals, and 17.6% had someone living alone who was 65 years of age or older. The average household size was 2.42 and the average family size was 3.03.

In the city, the population was spread out, with 26.1% under the age of 18, 10.0% from 18 to 24, 25.3% from 25 to 44, 21.5% from 45 to 64, and 17.2% who were 65 years of age or older. The median age was 37 years. For every 100 females, there were 78.7 males. For every 100 females age 18 and over, there were 74.9 males.

The median income for a household in the city was $21,696, and the median income for a family was $24,167. Males had a median income of $27,344 versus $20,341 for females. The per capita income for the city was $12,088. About 25.7% of families and 30.1% of the population were below the poverty line, including 54.8% of those under age 18 and 18.8% of those age 65 or over.

== Notable people ==
- Lee T. Todd Jr., President Emeritus, University of Kentucky
