= Nebo, Kentucky =

- City
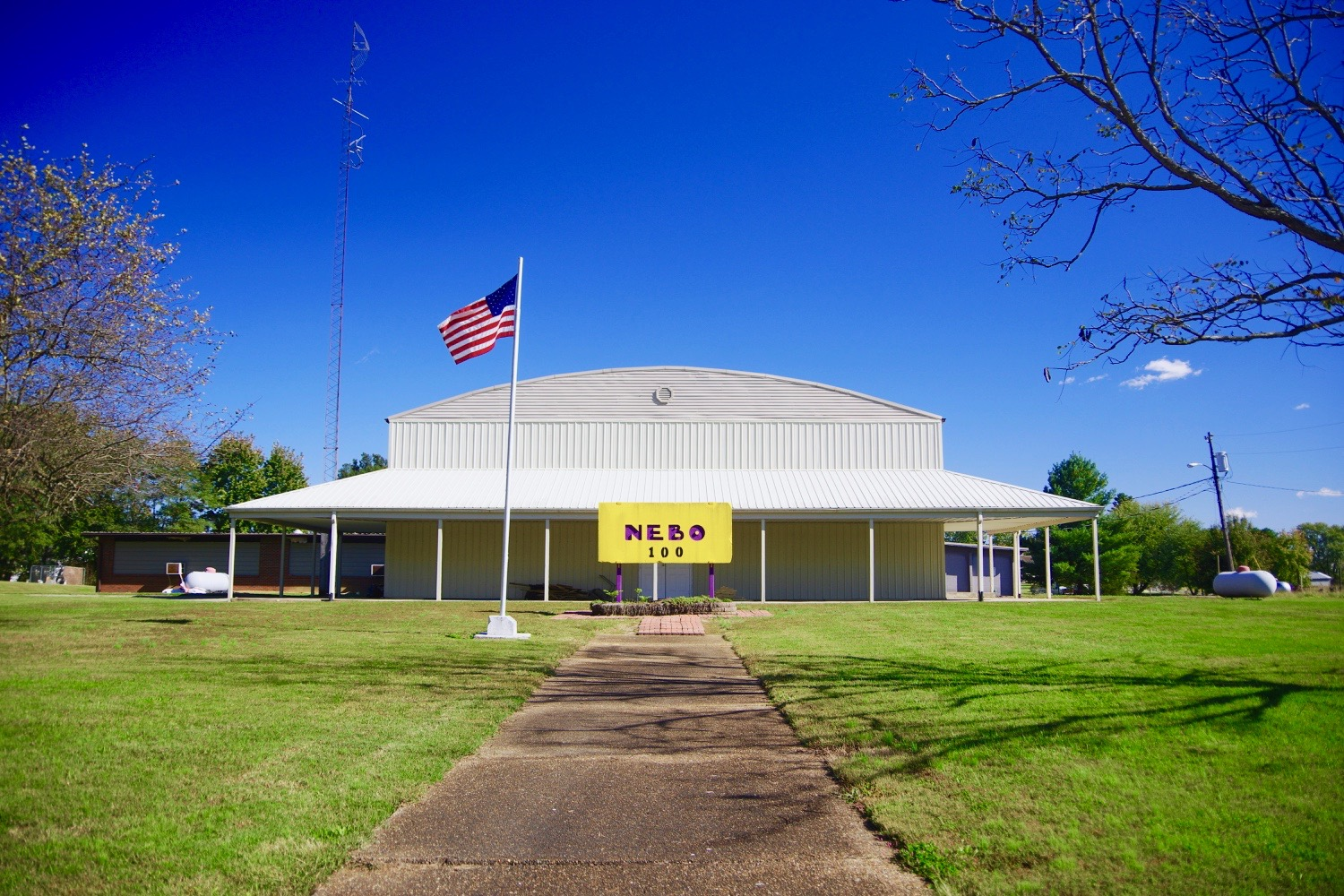
- Nebo Community Center

- Location of Nebo in Hopkins County, Kentucky.
- Coordinates: 37°23′4″N 87°38′29″W
- Country: United States
- State: Kentucky
- County: Hopkins
- Incorporated: 1861
- Named for: Mount Nebo

Area
  - Total: 0.25 sq mi (0.64 km^{2})
  - Land: 0.25 sq mi (0.64 km^{2})
  - Water: 0 sq mi (0.00 km^{2})
- Elevation: 404 ft (123 m)

Population (2020)
  - Total: 211
  - Density: 851.4/sq mi (328.73/km^{2})
- Time zone: UTC-6 (Central (CST))
  - Summer (DST): UTC-5 (CDT)
- ZIP code: 42441
- Area codes: 270 & 364
- FIPS code: 21-55092
- GNIS feature ID: 0499206

Nebo is a home rule-class city in Hopkins County, Kentucky, United States. The population was 204 as of 2024

== History ==
Nebo was established by pioneer and merchant Alfred Townes in 1840. It was named for the Biblical Mount Nebo, where Moses viewed the Promised Land. The city incorporated in 1861.

== Geography ==
Nebo is located in northwestern Hopkins County. U.S. Route 41A passes through the center of Nebo, leading east 9 miles (14 km) to Madisonville, the county seat, and west 7 miles (11 km) to Providence.

According to the United States Census Bureau, Nebo has a total area of 0.25 square miles (0.64 km^{2}), all land.

== Demographics ==
Historical population
Census	Pop.	Note	%±
1880	174		—
1890	183		5.2%
1900	237		29.5%
1910	298		25.7%
1920	265		−11.1%
1930	329		24.2%
1940	272		−17.3%
1950	282		3.7%
1960	338		19.9%
1970	274		−18.9%
1980	269		−1.8%
1990	227		−15.6%
2000	220		−3.1%
2010	236		7.3%
2020	211		−10.6%
U.S. Decennial Census

As of the census of 2000, there were 220 people, 84 households, and 67 families residing in the city. The population density was 877.9 inhabitants per square mile (339.0/km^{2}). There were 93 housing units at an average density of 371.1 per square mile (143.3/km^{2}). The racial makeup of the city was 100.00% White.

There were 84 households, out of which 34.5% had children under the age of 18 living with them, 59.5% were married couples living together, 11.9% had a female householder with no husband present, and 20.2% were non-families. 19.0% of all households were made up of individuals, and 10.7% had someone living alone who was 65 years of age or older. The average household size was 2.62 and the average family size was 2.97.

In the city, the population was spread out, with 25.5% under the age of 18, 13.2% from 18 to 24, 26.4% from 25 to 44, 24.1% from 45 to 64, and 10.9% who were 65 years of age or older. The median age was 36 years. For every 100 females, there were 101.8 males. For every 100 females age 18 and over, there were 97.6 males.

The median income for a household in the city was $31,667, and the median income for a family was $36,250. Males had a median income of $26,458 versus $21,250 for females. The per capita income for the city was $16,117. None of the families and 3.9% of the population were living below the poverty line, including no under eighteens and 19.4% of those over 64.
