= Hopkins County, Kentucky =

County in Kentucky, United States

- County
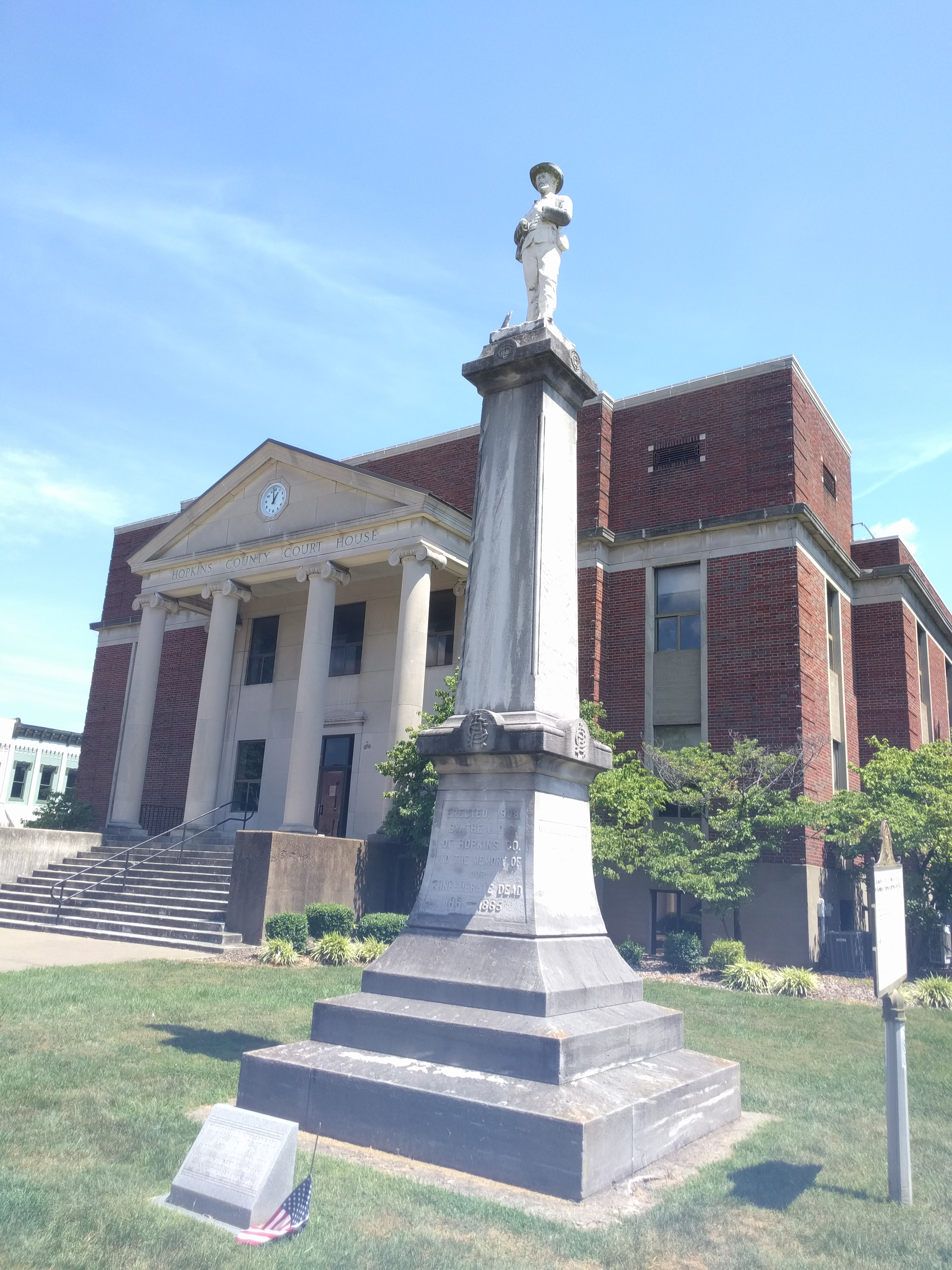
- Hopkins County Courthouse and Confederate Monument in Madisonville

- Location within the U.S. state of Kentucky
- Coordinates: 37°19′N 87°32′W
- Country: United States
- State: Kentucky
- Founded: 1806
- Named for: Samuel Hopkins
- Seat: Madisonville
- Largest city: Madisonville

Government
  - Judge/Executive: Jack Whitfield (R)

Area
  - Total: 554 sq mi (1,430 km^{2})
  - Land: 542 sq mi (1,400 km^{2})
  - Water: 12 sq mi (31 km^{2}) 2.2%

Population (2020)
  - Total: 45,423
  - Estimate (2025): 45,127 ▼
  - Density: 83.8/sq mi (32.4/km^{2})
- Time zone: UTC−6 (Central)
  - Summer (DST): UTC−5 (CDT)
- Congressional district: 1st
- Website: hopkinscounty.ky.gov

Hopkins County is a county located in the western part of the U.S. state of Kentucky. As of the 2020 census, the population was 45,423. Its county seat is Madisonville. Hopkins County was created December 9, 1806, from Henderson County. It was named for General Samuel Hopkins, an officer in both the American Revolutionary War and War of 1812, and later a Kentucky legislator and U.S. Congressman.

The Madisonville, Kentucky Micropolitan Statistical Area includes all of Hopkins County.

The topography ranges from flatlands along the broad river valleys of the Pond River, Tradewater River, and Green River, to hilly and rolling land in the southern and central parts of the county. Coal mines operate in the southern part of Hopkins County and agriculture is a mainstay in the northern part. Major crops are soybeans, corn, and tobacco. Along with coal, resources include oil and natural gas.

== History ==
The earliest inhabitants were prehistoric Native Americans who lived, hunted, and farmed in the region. One of their settlements was a rough stone structure on Fort Ridge, which has since been destroyed by strip mining for coal. Some of the early settlers were Revolutionary War veterans who received land grants for their service from Virginia in the area southwest of the Green River. Among these was Baron Von Steuben, a Prussian officer who had trained George Washington's Continental Army at Valley Forge during the winter of 1776–77. He had received a grant of several thousand acres in the northwest part of the county. According to tradition, Von Steuben was wounded in an Indian attack on his first visit to Kentucky. He then quit-claimed his property. Nevertheless, a salt spring on his grant came to be known as Steuben's Lick. By the 1880s, the community that grew up around the lick was known as Manitou.

Roads in the county often followed animal trails that led to salt and mineral springs. The major traces were those which connected the county seat at Madisonville with Henderson to the north, Hopkinsville to the south, and Russellville to the southeast. Numerous other trails led to the mills and ferries on the Pond and Tradewater Rivers and their tributaries.

On January 3, 1829, Ashbyburg in the northeastern part of the county was incorporated. Located on the Green River, it thrived as a steamboat landing during the 19th century. Other antebellum communities included Nebo, Kentucky, northwest of Madisonville, and Charleston, Kentucky, named after "Free Charles," a black freedman who operated a tavern in the southwest part of the county.

Hopkins County was divided by the American Civil War. Union supporters joined the 35th Kentucky Infantry (Mounted), a regiment recruited locally in late 1863 by James M. Shackelford, while in 1862 Adam Rankin Johnson had recruited Confederate troops for his 10th Kentucky Cavalry Regiment. The courthouse in Madisonville was burned by Kentucky Confederates led by Gen. Hylan Benton Lyon on December 17, 1864, as they passed through western Kentucky, since it was being used to house Union soldiers.

However, the harsh policies imposed by the occupying Union armies caused much resentment and served to increase the sympathy for the Confederate cause. Because of that, the majority of the white population voted for the Democratic Party well into the 20th century.

Farming was the major occupation in Hopkins County for most of the 19th century, with tobacco the leading crop. Around 1837 local blacksmith James Woolfolk found an outcropping of coal on his land.

=== Post-Civil War ===
John Bayless Earle, whom the town of Earlington, Kentucky was named for, opened the first coal mine in the county in 1869. Mining did not become a major industry until the Louisville & Nashville Railroad pushed its line southward from Henderson through Madisonville and toward Nashville in 1870.

Two years later, the Elizabethtown and Paducah Railroad (now Paducah and Louisville Railway) entered the county from the east. Many new communities were first established as railroad stops, including Crofton, Hanson, Mortons Gap, Nortonville, and White Plains. Dawson Springs, in the southwestern part of the county, began to thrive in the 1880s as a health resort, but its popularity had faded by the time of the Great Depression of the 1930s.

=== Economy and politics: late 20th century to present ===
Beginning in 1968, the majority white voters began to favor Republican Party presidential candidates. Since 2000, they have consistently voted for Republican candidates for the presidency (see table below), and increasingly so in local and statewide elections as well.

By 1970, Hopkins County was the second-largest producer of coal in the Western Coal Field, after Muhlenberg County, and the third-largest coal producer in the entire state after Muhlenberg and Pike County. In 1971 the county also ranked fifth in Kentucky in oil production.

Coal and oil-related businesses were major county employers by 1990. Development of resources was aided by the construction of the north–south Pennyrile Parkway and the east–west Western Kentucky Parkway through the county by the early 1970s. In 1987 farms occupied 41 percent of the land area, with 72 percent of farmland under cultivation.

== Geography ==
According to the United States Census Bureau, the county has a total area of 554 square miles (1,430 km^{2}), of which 542 square miles (1,400 km^{2}) is land and 12 square miles (31 km^{2}) (2.2%) is water.

=== Adjacent counties ===
- Webster County (northwest)
- McLean County (northeast)
- Muhlenberg County (southeast)
- Christian County (south)
- Caldwell County (southwest)

== Demographics ==
Historical population
Census	Pop.	Note	%±
1810	2,964		—
1820	5,322		79.6%
1830	6,763		27.1%
1840	9,171		35.6%
1850	12,441		35.7%
1860	11,875		−4.5%
1870	13,827		16.4%
1880	19,122		38.3%
1890	23,505		22.9%
1900	30,995		31.9%
1910	34,291		10.6%
1920	34,133		−0.5%
1930	37,449		9.7%
1940	37,789		0.9%
1950	38,815		2.7%
1960	38,458		−0.9%
1970	38,167		−0.8%
1980	46,174		21.0%
1990	46,126		−0.1%
2000	46,519		0.9%
2010	46,920		0.9%
2020	45,423		−3.2%
2025 (est.)	45,127	▼	−0.7%
U.S. Decennial Census; 1790-1960 1900-1990; 1990-2000 2010-2020

=== 2020 census ===
As of the 2020 census, the county had a population of 45,423. The median age was 41.9 years. 22.5% of residents were under the age of 18 and 19.5% of residents were 65 years of age or older. For every 100 females there were 95.0 males, and for every 100 females age 18 and over there were 93.1 males age 18 and over.

The racial makeup of the county was 86.6% White, 6.5% Black or African American, 0.2% American Indian and Alaska Native, 0.5% Asian, 0.1% Native Hawaiian and Pacific Islander, 1.2% from some other race, and 4.9% from two or more races. Hispanic or Latino residents of any race comprised 2.5% of the population.

47.0% of residents lived in urban areas, while 53.0% lived in rural areas.

There were 18,595 households in the county, of which 29.7% had children under the age of 18 living with them and 28.1% had a female householder with no spouse or partner present. About 29.7% of all households were made up of individuals and 13.1% had someone living alone who was 65 years of age or older.

There were 20,888 housing units, of which 11.0% were vacant. Among occupied housing units, 70.0% were owner-occupied and 30.0% were renter-occupied. The homeowner vacancy rate was 1.9% and the rental vacancy rate was 9.7%.

=== 2000 census ===
As of the census of 2000, there were 46,519 people, 18,820 households, and 13,399 families residing in the county. The population density was 84 per square mile (32/km^{2}). There were 20,668 housing units at an average density of 38 per square mile (15/km^{2}). The racial makeup of the county was 92.02% White, 6.21% Black or African American, 0.19% Native American, 0.34% Asian, 0.02% Pacific Islander, 0.37% from other races, and 0.86% from two or more races. 0.91% of the population were Hispanic or Latino of any race.

There were 18,820 households, out of which 31.60% had children under the age of 18 living with them, 56.30% were married couples living together, 11.90% had a female householder with no husband present, and 28.80% were non-families. 25.80% of all households were made up of individuals, and 11.50% had someone living alone who was 65 years of age or older. The average household size was 2.43 and the average family size was 2.91.

In the county, the population was spread out, with 24.20% under the age of 18, 8.30% from 18 to 24, 28.20% from 25 to 44, 24.60% from 45 to 64, and 14.70% who were 65 years of age or older. The median age was 38 years. For every 100 females there were 91.00 males. For every 100 females age 18 and over, there were 87.70 males.

The median income for a household in the county was $30,868, and the median income for a family was $36,794. Males had a median income of $31,400 versus $20,014 for females. The per capita income for the county was $17,382. About 13.60% of families and 16.50% of the population were below the poverty line, including 24.40% of those under age 18 and 10.50% of those age 65 or over.

== Education ==
Two public school districts operate in the county. Hopkins County Schools serves most of the county, except for most of the city of Dawson Springs, which is covered by the Dawson Springs Independent School District. The Dawson Springs district operates a single K-12 facility, Dawson Springs Community School.

As of July 2017, Hopkins County Schools' adopted a tobacco-free policy that stated that all tobacco products, including alternative nicotine products and vapor products were prohibited for use by anyone, anywhere on district grounds. The ban extends to outdoor events and inside vehicles on district grounds. The policy also applies to community groups that use school facilities and to field trips and any school-sponsored activity.

=== Elementary schools ===
- Grapevine Elementary
- Hanson Elementary
- Jesse Stuart Elementary
- Pride Elementary
- Southside Elementary
- West Broadway Elementary
- West Hopkins School
- Dawson Springs Community School
- Christ The King Elementary

=== Middle schools ===
- Browning Springs Middle School
- James Madison Middle School
- South Hopkins Middle School
- West Hopkins School
- Dawson Springs Community School

=== High schools ===
- Hopkins County Central High School
- Madisonville North Hopkins High School
- Dawson Springs Community School
- Grace Baptist

=== Community College ===
- Madisonville Community College

== Media ==
- The Madisonville Messenger, established in 1917, is the daily newspaper (Tues-Sun) and website (the-messenger.com) serving Hopkins, Webster and Muhlenberg counties.
- SurfKY News Group, Inc. was established in 2008, and served Western Kentucky for several years, but has closed.

== Communities ==
=== Cities ===
- Dawson Springs (partly in Caldwell County)
- Earlington
- Hanson
- Madisonville (county seat)
- Mortons Gap
- Nebo
- Nortonville
- St. Charles
- White Plains

=== Census-designated place ===
- Manitou

=== Unincorporated communities ===
- Anton
- Ashbyburg
- Barnsley
- Charleston
- Coiltown
- Dalton
- Daniel Boone
- Fiddle Bow
- Fies
- Grapevine
- Hecla
- Ilsley
- Richland
- Sixth Vein
- Wicks Well

== Politics ==
United States presidential election results for Hopkins County, Kentucky
Year	Republican		Democratic		Third party(ies)	
Year	No.	%	No.	%	No.	%
1912	1,357	20.87%	3,147	48.40%	1,998	30.73%
1916	3,615	48.17%	3,757	50.06%	133	1.77%
1920	6,732	45.38%	7,829	52.77%	275	1.85%
1924	5,292	44.64%	5,864	49.47%	698	5.89%
1928	6,330	48.69%	6,640	51.08%	30	0.23%
1932	3,817	29.16%	9,158	69.97%	113	0.86%
1936	3,602	30.43%	8,193	69.22%	42	0.35%
1940	3,884	30.80%	8,695	68.96%	30	0.24%
1944	3,795	33.96%	7,352	65.80%	27	0.24%
1948	2,608	26.15%	6,149	61.64%	1,218	12.21%
1952	4,285	37.36%	7,157	62.40%	27	0.24%
1956	5,300	44.47%	6,535	54.84%	82	0.69%
1960	5,574	46.41%	6,436	53.59%	0	0.00%
1964	3,328	29.46%	7,954	70.41%	15	0.13%
1968	3,791	31.94%	4,391	37.00%	3,687	31.06%
1972	7,133	68.67%	3,129	30.12%	126	1.21%
1976	5,115	39.38%	7,749	59.65%	126	0.97%
1980	6,238	40.63%	8,810	57.38%	307	2.00%
1984	9,368	57.95%	6,743	41.71%	55	0.34%
1988	7,979	51.46%	7,453	48.07%	73	0.47%
1992	6,032	34.41%	8,881	50.66%	2,618	14.93%
1996	6,363	41.89%	7,239	47.66%	1,588	10.45%
2000	9,490	57.55%	6,734	40.84%	265	1.61%
2004	12,314	65.35%	6,420	34.07%	109	0.58%
2008	11,916	61.59%	7,104	36.72%	328	1.70%
2012	13,681	69.21%	5,789	29.29%	297	1.50%
2016	15,277	75.09%	4,310	21.18%	758	3.73%
2020	15,757	73.25%	5,439	25.28%	316	1.47%
2024	15,361	74.80%	4,916	23.94%	260	1.27%

=== Elected officials ===
Elected officials as of January 3, 2025
U.S. House	James Comer (R)	KY 1
Ky. Senate	Robby Mills (R)	4
Ky. House	Wade Williams (R)	4

== See also ==
- National Register of Historic Places listings in Hopkins County, Kentucky
