= Dawson Springs, Kentucky =

- City
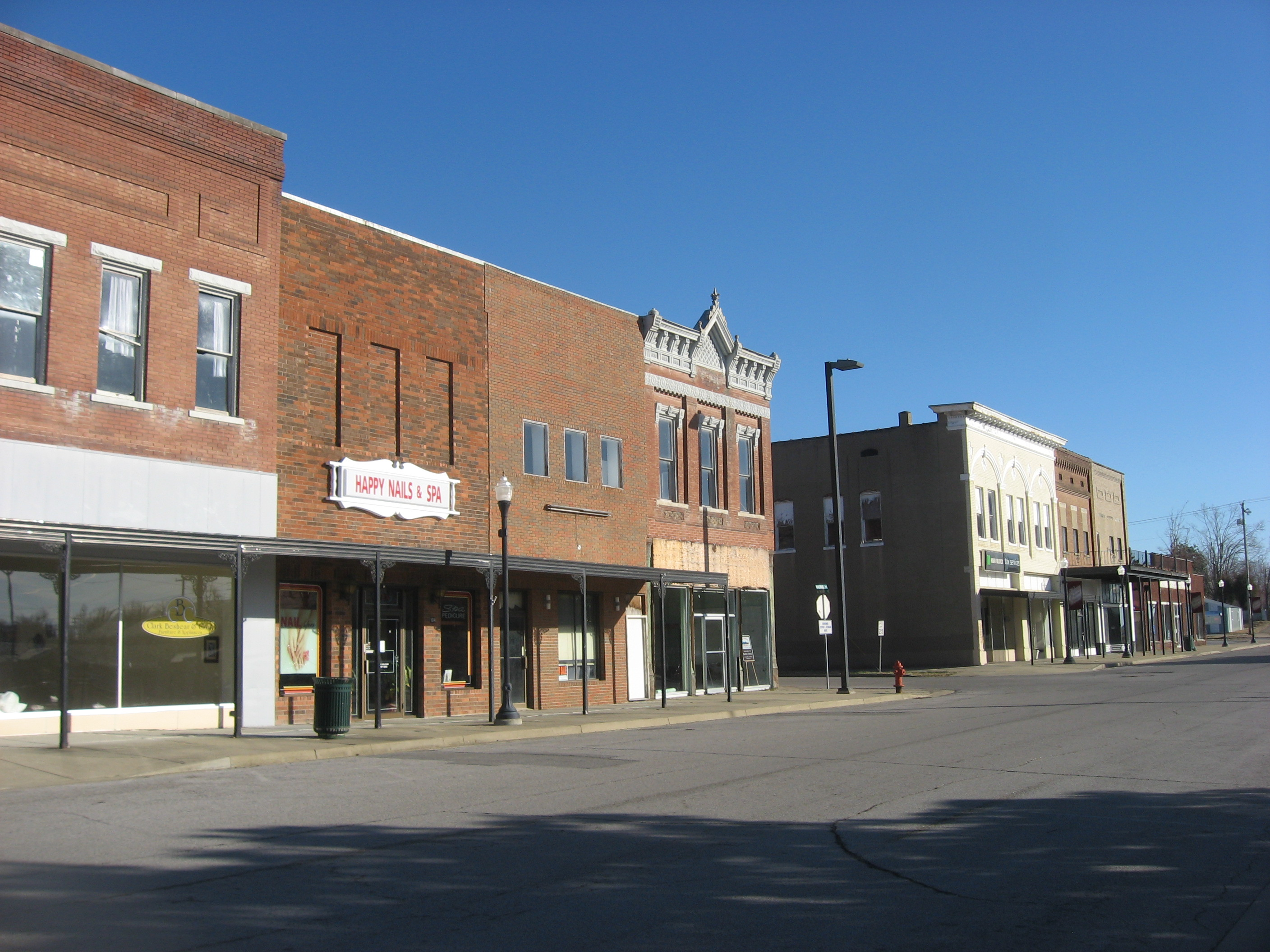
- Railroad Avenue downtown (2014)

- Location within Hopkins County and Kentucky
- Coordinates: 37°10′18″N 87°41′21″W
- Country: United States
- State: Kentucky
- Counties: Caldwell, Hopkins

Area
  - Total: 3.93 sq mi (10.17 km^{2})
  - Land: 3.84 sq mi (9.94 km^{2})
  - Water: 0.089 sq mi (0.23 km^{2})
- Elevation: 420 ft (130 m)

Population (2020)
  - Total: 2,452
  - Estimate (2024): 2,254
  - Density: 639/sq mi (246.7/km^{2})
- Time zone: UTC-6 (CST)
  - Summer (DST): UTC-5 (CDT)
- ZIP code: 42408
- Area code: 270 & 364
- FIPS code: 21-20224
- GNIS ID: 490696
- Website: dawsonspringsky.com

Dawson Springs is a home rule-class city in Hopkins and Caldwell counties in the U.S. state of Kentucky. As of the 2020 census, the population of the city was 2,452. It was a spa and resort town visited by tourists.

== History ==
Originally known as Tradewater Bend, the city was incorporated in 1832 under the name Dawson City by two Menser brothers.

From the late 1800s to the 1930s, Dawson Springs was well known as a spa and resort town. Visitors largely came in spring from Chicago, Louisville and points east for the curative waters, and several major hotels and boarding houses were constructed. Tourism peaked in 1901 when over 50,000 visitors came to the town of a few thousand people. The Pittsburgh Pirates held spring training there in the 1910s before being lured to St. Petersburg, Florida when the Grapefruit League formed. The advent of car travel ended the spa era as travelers began to drive to more southerly vacation spots.

Outwood Veterans Hospital was constructed here in 1922, and the economy strengthened with the onset of coal mining at Dawson Daylight Mine. The town diversified with light manufacturing in the mid-20th century, but was devastated by the outflow of those industrial jobs when NAFTA was passed in the 1990s and those manufacturing jobs moved to Mexico.

Dawson Springs is still a regional tourist destination because of the Pennyrile Forest State Resort Park, which began construction where a local river was dammed and a lake formed in the 1930s. The town was named Kentucky's first Trail Town due to hiking and horse riding trails in the area.

=== 2021 tornado ===
In the late evening of December 10, 2021, a large swath of the city was destroyed by an EF4 tornado, and a tornado emergency was issued for Dawson Springs and the surrounding St. Charles as the storm moved through the area. As a result, 19 people died.

== Geography ==
Dawson Springs is located in southwestern Hopkins County at 37°10′18″N 87°41′21″W (37.171799, -87.689190). Its southern and western border is the Tradewater River, which is also the Hopkins/Caldwell County line. A small portion of Dawson Springs extends across the river into Caldwell County.

U.S. Route 62 passes through the center of the city, leading east 14 miles (23 km) to Nortonville and west 12 miles (19 km) to Princeton. Interstate 69 runs generally parallel to US 62 and touches the northern end of Dawson Springs' city limits, with access from exit 92 (Kentucky Route 109).

According to the United States Census Bureau, the city has a total area of 3.9 square miles (10.2 km^{2}), of which 3.8 square miles (9.9 km^{2}) is land and 0.077 square miles (0.2 km^{2}), or 2.23%, is water.

=== Climate ===
The climate in this area is characterized by hot, humid summers and generally mild to cool winters. According to the Köppen Climate Classification system, Dawson Springs has a humid subtropical climate, abbreviated "Cfa" on climate maps.

== Demographics ==
Historical population
Census	Pop.	Note	%±
1890	525		—
1900	935		78.1%
1910	1,350		44.4%
1920	1,762		30.5%
1930	2,311		31.2%
1940	2,560		10.8%
1950	2,374		−7.3%
1960	3,002		26.5%
1970	3,009		0.2%
1980	3,275		8.8%
1990	3,129		−4.5%
2000	2,980		−4.8%
2010	2,764		−7.2%
2020	2,452		−11.3%
2024 (est.)	2,254		−8.1%
U.S. Decennial Census

=== 2020 census ===
As of the 2020 census, Dawson Springs had a population of 2,452. The median age was 44.6 years. 21.6% of residents were under the age of 18 and 22.2% of residents were 65 years of age or older. For every 100 females there were 86.0 males, and for every 100 females age 18 and over there were 82.0 males age 18 and over.

0.0% of residents lived in urban areas, while 100.0% lived in rural areas.

There were 1,070 households in Dawson Springs, of which 27.3% had children under the age of 18 living in them. Of all households, 34.8% were married-couple households, 21.2% were households with a male householder and no spouse or partner present, and 36.6% were households with a female householder and no spouse or partner present. About 37.5% of all households were made up of individuals and 16.1% had someone living alone who was 65 years of age or older.

There were 1,201 housing units, of which 10.9% were vacant. The homeowner vacancy rate was 2.4% and the rental vacancy rate was 8.2%.

Racial composition as of the 2020 census
Race	Number	Percent
White	2,305	94.0%
Black or African American	19	0.8%
American Indian and Alaska Native	5	0.2%
Asian	3	0.1%
Native Hawaiian and Other Pacific Islander	0	0.0%
Some other race	18	0.7%
Two or more races	102	4.2%
Hispanic or Latino (of any race)	43	1.8%

=== 2000 census ===
As of the census of 2000, there were 2,980 people, 1,214 households, and 801 families residing in the city. The population density was 755.8 inhabitants per square mile (291.8/km^{2}). There were 1,353 housing units at an average density of 343.2 units per square mile (132.5 units/km^{2}). The racial makeup of the city was 97.72% White, 0.94% African American, 0.27% Native American, 0.30% Asian, 0.07% from other races, and 0.70% from two or more races. Hispanic or Latino of any race were 0.27% of the population.

There were 1,214 households, of which 28.9% had children under the age of 18 living with them, 48.4% were married couples living together, 14.8% had a female householder with no husband present, and 34.0% were non-families. 31.2% of all households were made up of individuals, and 17.1% had someone living alone who was 65 years of age or older. The average household size was 2.31 and the average family size was 2.90.

In the city, the population was spread out, with 23.1% under the age of 18, 8.4% from 18 to 24, 25.4% from 25 to 44, 21.1% from 45 to 64, and 22.0% who were 65 years of age or older. The median age was 40 years. For every 100 females, there were 84.3 males. For every 100 females age 18 and over, there were 78.7 males.

The median income for a household in the city was $22,670, and the median income for a family was $27,872. Males had a median income of $29,545 versus $18,875 for females. The per capita income for the city was $14,649. About 25.5% of families and 27.1% of the population were below the poverty line, including 39.0% of those under age 18 and 18.9% of those age 65 or over.

== Education ==
Dawson Springs has a lending library, a branch of the Hopkins County-Madisonville Public Library. Dawson Springs also rejected the countywide school consolidation of the 1970s and maintains its own K-12 school district, which is now the town's main employer.

== Notable people ==
- Steve Beshear, 61st Governor of Kentucky
- Scott Jennings, political strategist
- Mila Mason, country music artist
- Dottie Rambo, gospel music artist
