= Bertha Mae Lillenas =

American evangelist and hymn writer (1889–1945)

Betha Mae Lillenas
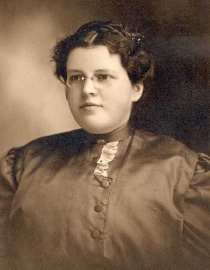
- Born: Bertha Mae Wilson; March 3, 1889; Hanson, Kentucky, U.S.
- Died: April 13, 1945 (aged 56)
- Resting place: Forest Hill Calvary Cemetery; Kansas City, Missouri, U.S.
- Occupations: Evangelist; hymn writer
- Spouse: Haldor Lillenas (m. 1910)

Bertha Mae (Wilson) Lillenas (March 1, 1889 – April 13, 1945) was a popular American hymnist and evangelist in the Church of the Nazarene. Ordained in 1912 as a Nazarene elder, she served as a pastor for five congregations. One of these, her last congregation, Indianapolis First Church of the Nazarene, doubled in size during her pastorate (1923-1926). After leaving the pastorate, Bertha Mae served as the vice-president of the Church of the Nazarene's Women's General Missionary Council and as the editor of the newsletter, Junior Light Bearers. In her last years, she led revivals (when her health permitted), edited a hymnal, Great Gospel Songs (1929), authored a collection of hymns, Fireside Hymns (1945), and assisted in the management of the Lillenas Publishing Company. As a hymnist, her work was performed on popular, gospel radio broadcasts, and her hymns were included in widely circulated hymnals. Two of her hymns, "Jesus Is Always There" and "Jesus Took My Burden," are among those that are used in contemporary worship.

== Early life ==
Bertha Mae Wilson was born on March 1, 1889, in Hanson, Kentucky. She was the second of three children of Eliza Jane Jones (1867-1893) and William C. Wilson (1866–1915). Her mother, Eliza, died of typhoid fever when Bertha Mae was a small child. Eliza was a devout Christian (prayerful) and was remembered by the family for praying for each child while on her deathbed. Her father, "W.C.", was an itinerant pastor in the Methodist tradition in churches in Illinois. In Bertha Mae's early years, W.C. was frequently away from home, traveling from one church to another. As a result, the children were placed with different relatives, and Bertha Mae lived with her maternal aunt. A few years after Eliza Jane's death, W.C. married Sarah Ragsdale, a school teacher, and the family reunited. Bertha Mae's father joined the Church of the Nazarene in 1903 and (while visiting churches in Los Angeles, California) accepted an invitation to pastor a church in Upland, California in 1905. On receiving a letter from W.C., Bertha Mae's stepmother (to ensure that W.C. would not change his mind) sold the family's furniture and packed their belongings in anticipation of the move from Illinois to California. During his career, W.C. included women evangelists in his ministry—for example, by hosting the sisters, Carrie Krow and Lulu Kell, to sing at his services. He also invited women to lead revivals—encouraging one of them, Minnie Staples, to pursue ordination as an elder and licensed minister. As a result, Bertha Mae saw women evangelists as role models in her youth.

Bertha Mae finished high school when she was sixteen years old and was already a proficient musician at that age. The following year, she enrolled in Deets Pacific Bible College—a school located (at that time) in Hollywood, California. (Deets Pacific Bible College eventually (after several moves and renamings) became Point Loma Nazarene University.) Her brother, Guy Wilson, was already attending the school. Bertha Mae attended the school for four years and self-reported that she graduated with the "highest credits of any student during the four years." Her professional life as a minister began at Deets, when, while she was still a student, she took on the role at a pastor as a small church in Los Angeles, California. Bertha Mae also met her husband, Haldor Lillenas, at Deets. The couple bonded over music and ministry. Haldor recalled that "She was an eloquent and gifted preacher of the gospel ... our voices blended well and so we arranged it that our lives should also be blended." The couple married in 1910.

== Career ==
Bertha Mae and Haldor Lillenas were ministry partners. The partnership began at the beginning, when they were ordained together in 1912 as elders in the Church of the Nazarene by Dr. H. F. Reynolds at the 1912 assembly of the Southern California District. Their first ministry together had already begun in 1910 at the Peniel Mission in Sacramento, California. In the early days of their work, they were often in itinerant ministries and were poor. They sometimes relied on donations received while conducting street ministry. The couple received their first co-pastorate in 1910 for a church in Lompoc, California. Without the constant need to travel for itinerant ministry, the couple was able to start a family at this time. The couple had two children—Evangeline Mae (1911) and Wendell Haldor (1915). Together, the couple led churches in Lompoc, California (1910-1912), Pomona, California (1912-1914), Auburn, Illinois (1916-1919), Peniel, Texas (1919-1920), Redlands, California (1920-1923), and Indianapolis, Indiana (1923-1926). Although both were accomplished hymnists, Haldor focused more so on the music ministry and was often away from their congregations for as much as three weeks at a time to work as a music evangelist. During the times that he was away, the pastoral leadership of the churches was left to Bertha Mae. While Haldor focused on hymn writing and publishing, Bertha Mae's success as a church planter and leader grew. Her most successful pastorate, at Indianapolis First Church of the Nazarene, saw the congregation double in size in just three years. While Bertha Mae took a primary role in the preaching in Indianapolis, Haldor was able to launch a publishing company, Lillenas Publishing, in 1924. At roughly the same time, however, Bertha Mae's health began to decline. The couple resigned from the co-pastorate in 1926. In 1930, Haldor sold the publishing company to The Nazarene Publishing House in Kansas City, Missouri, and the couple moved to Missouri. In Missouri, Haldor continued to manage the business of Lillenas Publishing, while Bertha Mae devoted her time to missions and revivals. Bertha Mae became the second vice president of the Women's General Missionary Council of the Nazarene Church in 1930. In this role, she advocated for youth missions and edited the newsletter, Junior Light Bearers. As Bertha Mae's health continued to decline, the couple purchased and moved, in 1940, to a stone house near the Lake of the Ozarks that they named Melody Lane. Bertha Mae died five years later on April 13, 1945. She was buried at Forest Hill Calvary Cemetery in Kansas City.

== Legacy ==
During her lifetime, Bertha Mae Lillenas was well known within the Church of the Nazarene denomination. She held national roles as an elder, as vice president of the Women's General Missionary Council and as the editor of the newsletter, Junior Light Bearers. However, she gained a much broader audience as a hymnist. As radio stations became more common, popular Christian radio shows began to feature her work. A well-known figure in the evangelical music scene, Homer Rodeheaver, featured her best-known hymn, "Jesus Took My Burden," in his radio show and included it in a book based on his show, Selections from Christian Service Songs (1939). Similarly, a popular performer of Christian hymns, Edward MacHugh, included two of Bertha Mae's hymns ("Jesus is Always There" and "Jesus Took My Burden") in a book requested for purchase by 43,000 listeners. In addition to "Jesus is Always There" and "Jesus Took My Burden," Bertha Mae's hymns "He Will Not Forget," "Leave Your Burden at the Place of Prayer," and "Saved by the Blood" were also popular in the 1930s and the 1940s. Bertha Mae was also active as an editor of hymns and contributed to the Nazarene hymnal, Great Gospel Songs, published by Lillenas Publishing in 1929. Editions of the hymnal were widely circulated among churches, with 700,000 copies distributed. After Bertha Mae's death, her husband, Haldor Lillenas, compiled and published a book of hymns by his recently deceased wife, Fireside Hymns (1945).

Given the well-documented history of Haldor Lillenas's publishing activities, Bertha Mae's role as a minister and hymnist has been overlooked. Without Bertha Mae's success as co-pastor of the churches where they ministered, Haldor would have been unable to focus on his work as a publisher. Haldor gave credit to Bertha Mae's skills as a church leader in his memoirs and acknowledged that she took the primary role in leading the churches in Auburn, Illinois and Indianapolis, Indiana. Haldor remembered her work at Indianapolis First Church as their "most successful pastorate." Bertha Mae's legacy may have also been overlooked by historians as the Nazarene denomination became more focused on male leadership and reflective of broader U.S. Evangelicalism in the 1970s. Even so, Bertha Mae had a significant role in the growth of the Church of the Nazarene, and several of the 32 hymns that she composed remained popular for decades after her death.
