= Haldor Lillenas =

American gospel hymn writer (1885–1959)

Haldor Lillenas (19 November 1885 – 18 August 1959) was a Norwegian-American hymnwriter. Described as "one of the most important twentieth-century gospel hymn writers and publishers", he is regarded as "the most influential Wesleyan / Holiness songwriter and publisher in the 20th century". Additionally, Lillenas was an ordained minister in the Church of the Nazarene, author, song evangelist, poet, music publisher and prolific hymnwriter, who is estimated to have composed over 4,000 hymns, the most famous being Wonderful Grace of Jesus. In 1931 Lillenas was the producer of Glorious Gospel Songs, the first hymnal for the Church of the Nazarene. In 1982 Lillenas was inducted into the Gospel Music Hall of Fame.

== Biographical details ==
=== Early life ===
Haldor Lillenas was born on 19 November 1885 on Stord Island, near Bergen, Norway, the son of Ole Paulsen Lillenas (born May 1854 in Norway; died 24 July 1926 in Hennepin County, Minnesota), a farmer and storekeeper, and his wife Anna Marie Lillenas (born March 1851 in Norway; died c. 1906 in Minnesota), and brother of Paul Olson (born 27 March 1879 in Norway; died 18 May 1934 in Hennepin County, Minnesota), Johanes O. (born July 1882 in Norway), Katrine G. (born July 1888 in North Dakota), and George M. (born 11 March 1896 in Astoria, Oregon).

The Lillenas family farm comprised 15 acres (61,000 m^{2}) of rocky ground, which was sold to allow the family to migrate to the United States. While Anna and her three children lived temporarily in a home south of Bergen, Ole Lillenas migrated from Norway to the United States of America via Canada in 1886, where he bought a farm in Colton, South Dakota. After Ole finished constructing a sod house, Anna, and the three children were re-united with him in 1887. In 1889 the Lillenas family relocated again to a farm on the Columbia River near Astoria, Oregon. While living in Astoria, Lillenas learned English and began to attend school. In 1900 the family moved to Roseville Township, Kandiyohi County, Minnesota. While in Roseville, Lillenas began attending high school in a Lutheran school at Hawick, Minnesota. At the age of 17, Lillenas began a four-year correspondence course from the International Correspondence Schools in chemistry and chemical analysis with private tutors. Lillenas worked as a farm labourer most of the year, but during winter he concentrated on his studies. About 1906 Anna Marie Lillenas died, and Ole decided to relocate the family to North Dakota, however Lillenas decided to move back to Astoria, Oregon, where he finished his correspondence course and found employment in a chemical factory.

=== Spiritual experience ===
Like most Scandinavians at that time, Lillenas was raised in a Lutheran family. The Lillenas family were devout in their religious life, and attended community services when held in their area. At the age of fifteen Lillenas became a confirmed member of the Lutheran Church in Hawick. However, Lillenas indicated in his autobiography that at that time, he had not experienced "the miracle of the new birth". As a young boy, Lillenas had been befriended by an elderly woman who taught him English, and told him about Jesus. As a consequence, in 1906 Lillenas began to attend meetings at the Peniel Mission, a holiness rescue mission, in Astoria, Oregon where this woman was an active worker. According to Lillenas in a 1948 interview, it was shortly after the death of his mother, soon after moving to Astoria, one summer evening "he paused to listen to a street corner service. There he heard for the first time the strains of 'Tell Mother I'll Be There'. He made his decision then to devote his life to Christian service." According to McGraw, the "singing and testimonies brought conviction to his heart. Later that year he was saved, and three weeks later his heart was cleansed. Soon he was "helping in the mission, singing to his heart's content, witnessing with joy to 'the wonderful grace of Jesus', and writing songs with increasing skill and volume."

In 1907 Lillenas moved to Portland, Oregon, where he worked with the Peniel Mission located at 247 NW Couch Street. All Peniel Mission workers were unsalaried, but the local mission paid for most of their expenses. Soon after, Lillenas testified that he believed he was called to be a minister of the gospel, at which time he was appointed leader of the Portland mission. During his year of leadership, "he saw so many souls won to Christ that he felt more certain than ever that he should devote his life to the Lord's work." In 1908 Lillenas became a member of the Portland First Church of the Nazarene, then located at 428 Burnside Street, which had been founded on 4 July 1906. Soon after Lillenas enrolled in the ministerial course of studies, which he began by correspondence. Soon afterward, Lillenas joined a vocal group associated with the Salvation Army called the "Charioteers' Brigade", which held street meetings and revival services throughout a large portion of California.

=== Ministerial preparation ===
As a result of some generous donations, and the efforts of Rev. A.O. Hendricks, pastor of the Portland Church of the Nazarene, in 1909 Lillenas was able to continue his ministerial studies at the Deets Pacific Bible College, an antecedent of Point Loma Nazarene University, located at the corner of San Pedro and East 28th Streets, Los Angeles, California. Additionally, Lillenas was able to secure part-time work to finance his studies, but by the end of the year accepted the ministry as the music director of a local church, and was active in songwriting and preaching. During this time Lillenas also studied voice at the Lyric School of Music in Los Angeles.

=== Marriages and family ===
==== Bertha Mae Wilson ====
While at Deets College Lillenas was in a college group that held evangelistic services most weekends. On this team was another student, Bertha Mae Wilson (born 1 March 1889 in Hanson, Kentucky; died 13 March 1945 at Tuscumbia, Missouri), the oldest daughter of Rev. William C. Wilson (1866–1915), then pastor of Pasadena First Church of the Nazarene., but later a general superintendent in the Church of the Nazarene. Lillenas and Bertha Mae both preached, sang, and wrote songs, and often practised in the home of her father. In his autobiography Lilenas recalled: "We soon learned that our voices blended well and so we arranged it that our lives should also be blended." On 4 October 1910 Lillenas married Bertha Mae. Bertha Mae was later an ordained minister in the Church of the Nazarene and composer. They had two children: Evangeline Mae (born 27 November 1911 in Santa Barbara, California) and Wendell Haldor (born 14 April 1915 in Illinois; died 1967 in Bethany, Oklahoma).

==== Lola Dell ====
After the death of Bertha from cancer in March 1945, Lillenas married Lola Dell (born 23 March 1894 in Kansas; died October 1974 in Kansas) later that year.

=== Later years ===
In the depths of the Great Depression, 1938, the Lillenas family purchased a 500-acre (2.0 km^{2}) rural acreage in the Miller County, Missouri hills of The Ozarks, halfway between Tuscumbia and Iberia on Missouri Route 17, about 75 kilometres (47 mi) southwest of Jefferson City. Here they constructed their home, which they called "Melody Lane". It was here that Bertha Mae died of cancer in March 1945, and where Lillenas and his second wife, Lola, lived until they relocated to Pasadena, California by 1955. When they lived at Melody Lane, Lillenas was an active member of the Iberia Church of the Nazarene, where there is now a memorial stained glass window in his honor.

After a visit to Israel in 1955, Lillenas sponsored a Palestinian Greek Orthodox family he had met as immigrants to the US, that included twelve-year-old Sirhan Bishara Sirhan (born March 19, 1944), the convicted assassin of Robert F. Kennedy. After their arrival in Pasadena, California in January 1957, the Sirhan family stayed with Lillenas for three months in his home, before moving into a home Lillenas rented and furnished for them. When Mary Sirhan's husband abandoned her and her two sons, and returned to Jordan, Lillenas ensured that they were able to remain in the USA.

=== Death and burial ===
Lillenas died on 18 August 1959 at Aspen, Colorado.

== Career ==
=== Pastor ===
Soon after his conversion in 1906, Lillenas was convinced that he was called to be a minister. Lillenas was a pastor for the Church of the Nazarene for fifteen years from 1910. Soon after his marriage in October 1910, they moved to Sacramento, California where they took charge of the Peniel Mission. After a year, Lillenas became the pastor of the Lompoc, California Church of the Nazarene. Lillenas and Bertha Mae were both ordained as elders in the Church of the Nazarene on the Southern California District in 1912 by Dr. Hiram F. Reynolds. At the time Bertha's father was the district superintendent. During this pastorate, Lillenas took a two-year course in composition and harmony with Welsh singer and composer Daniel Protheroe (born 5 November 1866; died 25 February 1934) and Adolph Rosenbecker from the Siegel–Myers Correspondence School of Music in Chicago, Illinois. Apparently they produced 78 rpm records and cylinders and sent them to their students, e.g. Siegel–Myers School of Music - Vocal Record F, Record format: Edison Gold Moulded cylinder, Release date: c. 1906, (also known as the University Extension Conservatory). Because of his pastoral duties, it took him three years to complete the course.

Lillenas subsequently pastored churches in Pomona, California; Redlands, California; Auburn, Illinois (1916–1919); Peniel, Texas; and Indianapolis, Indiana (1923–1926). When Lillenas resigned from Indianapolis First Church to focus on his publishing house, Bertha became the pastor until they relocated to Kansas City, Missouri in 1930.

=== Song evangelist ===
For ten years Lillenas was a song evangelist, who traveled with Bertha Mae holding revival services. Among those churches where he held evangelistic services was the Wesleyan Methodist Church in New Jersey where the father of George Beverly Shea was the pastor.

=== Hymnwriter ===
From a very young age, Lillenas began to write his own songs, however it was not until he was 19 years old, that he attempted to have them published. In a 1948 interview, Lillenas indicated: "I was living in North Dakota at that time and I noticed an advertisement from a publishing company asking for new songs to publish. I didn't know then that a reputable publisher never has to advertise for songs. I spent $25 to have my songs published and I received $3.65 in "royalties" from that venture. My first few songs were not too successful." In the same interview he revealed that after many rejections, he finally succeeded in selling ten of his songs to one publisher for 50 cents each. One of these songs, He Set Me Free, became popular. Lillenas indicated that soon after his conversion at the age of 21, that he began to increasingly write hymns and songs that expressed his faith and joy. Lillenas was a prolific composer of hymns, and it is estimated that "in his lifetime, he wrote some 4,000 hymns, and supplied songs for many evangelists." Lillenas composed songs for cantatas for Easter and Christmas, Special Day church services. Lillenas used many pseudonyms to compose his songs, including Virginia Rose Golden, Laverne Gray, Richard Hainsworth, Rev. H. N. Lines, Robert Whitmore and Ferne Winters. In 1938 Lillenas became a member of the American Society of Composers, Authors and Publishers (ASCAP).

While some of his hymns, such as Wonderful Grace of Jesus and The Bible Stands, crossed denominational barriers and appeared in the hymnals of various Protestant churches, most were used by Lillenas' own denomination and its ecclesiastical cousins within the Wesleyan-Holiness movement. Nazarene historian Floyd Cunningham sees "the number of songs by Haldor Lillenas that we sang, that were peculiar to us" as evidence of increased sectarianism in the Church of the Nazarene in its second generation. Timothy L. Smith asserts that this generation believed that "to keep the Spirit in the church, it seemed necessary to keep up the tempo." Among the prominent hymns that Lillenas wrote are:

- He Set Me Free (1909)
- Holiness Forevermore (1910)
- Where They Need No Sun (1911)
- Wonderful Peace (1914)
- Jesus Has Lifted Me (1916) (music only)
- Will the Circle be Broken? (1916)
- The Bible Stands (1917)
- Glorious Freedom (1917)
- Wonderful Grace of Jesus (1918)
- It Is Glory Just To Walk With Him (1918) (music only)
- I Have Settled The Question (1919)
- Tell the Blessèd Story (1920)
- The Peace That Jesus Gives
- O My Heart Sings Today (1924)
- I Know a Name (1928)
- There's a Blessed and Triumphant Song.
- My Wonderful Lord (1938)

In 1958 Lillenas wrote The Sun Never Sets, a song to commemorate the fiftieth anniversary of the creation of the Church of the Nazarene, based on a quotation from early Nazarene founder Phineas Bresee, who often said: "We are in the sunrise of the Nazarene movement and the sun never sets in the morning."

==== Wonderful Grace of Jesus (1918) ====
Lillenas' best known song is probably Wonderful Grace of Jesus, which he wrote during his pastorate at the Church of the Nazarene in Auburn, Illinois. Lillenas explains the origin of this gospel song:

In 1917, Mrs. Lillenas and I built our first little home in the town of Olivet, Illinois. Upon its completion, we had scarcely any money left to furnish the little home. Having no piano at the time, and needing an instrument of some kind, I managed to find, at one of the neighbor's home, a little wheezy organ which I purchased for $5.00. With the aid of this instrument, a number of my songs, were written which are now popular, including 'Wonderful Grace of Jesus.'

Wonderful Grace of Jesus was copyrighted in 1918, but not published until 1922 in the Tabernacle Choir Book. Lillenas was paid $5.00 for this song.

=== Poet ===
Lillenas was a respected poet. One of his notable poems was his 1928 poem, Poverty.

=== Publisher ===
In 1924, while still serving as pastor of the Indianapolis First Church of the Nazarene, Lillenas founded the Lillenas Publishing Company. Shares were offered initially for $100 each. The President was E.W. Petticord; the Vice President was Kenneth H. Wells; the Secretary/Treasurer was Fra Morton, while Lillenas was the manager. On 16 October 1925 Lillenas Publishing Company opened the doors to their offices, which were located at 5921 East Washington Street (at the corner with Arlington Avenue). In 1926 Lillenas resigned as pastor to allow him to devote his energies to the publishing company. Bertha Mae assumed the pastoral responsibilities. Before Lillenas Publishing Company was sold to the Nazarene Publishing House in Kansas City, Missouri in 1930, more than 700,000 hymnals and song books were published and sold. The sale included 1,535 copyrights. The sale agreement mandated that Lillenas would serve as manager of Lillenas Publishing Company for ten years and then be reviewed. However Lillenas continued as an editor until his retirement in 1950, at the age of 65. After his retirement, Lillenas served as an adviser to the Music department of Nazarene Publishing House until his death.

=== Author ===
Lillenas was the editor and compiler of over fifty song books for church and Sunday School. Lillenas' first book was Special Sacred Songs, which was published in 1919. Among his other publications was the first official hymnal for the Church of the Nazarene, Glorious Gospel Songs, published in 1931, soon after Lillenas Publishing Company became part of the Nazarene Publishing House. Glorious Gospel Hymns included about 700 hymns and gospel songs, of which 81 were of his own composition.

After his retirement from the Nazarene Publishing House in 1950, Lillenas and his second wife, Lola, traveled extensively, including three trips to his native Norway. During this period Lillenas wrote three books: Modern Gospel Song Stories (1952); an autobiography, Down Melody Lane: An Autobiography (1953); and Motoring 11,000 miles Through Norway: A Guide for Tourists with Sixty Suggested Tours (1955), a travel book based on his three trips to Norway.

== Awards and honors ==
In 1941 Olivet Nazarene College awarded Lillenas an honorary Doctor of Music degree in recognition of his contributions to American hymnody.

In 1982 Lillenas was inducted into the Gospel Music Association Hall of Fame.

In the Caravan scouting program of the Church of the Nazarene, the Haldor Lillenas Award is presented to outstanding fifth and sixth grade children.

== Works ==
- 1929 Raking Leaves and Other Poems. Nazarene Publishing House.
- 1952 Modern Gospel Song Stories. Kansas City, MO: Beacon Hill Press.
- 1953 Down Melody Lane: An Autobiography. Kansas City, MO: Beacon Hill.
- 1955 Motoring 11,000 miles Through Norway: A Guide for Tourists with Sixty Suggested Tours. Exposition Press.
