= Peniel =

Peniel may refer to:

== Places ==
- Penuel, mentioned in Vayishlach

=== United Kingdom ===
- Peniel, Carmarthenshire, West Wales
- Llanrhaeadr-yng-Nghinmeirch, North Wales
- Llansamlet, south Wales
- Trinity Church (Brentwood), formerly Peniel Pentecostal Church, England

=== United States ===
- Peniel Mission, California
- Peniel Missionary Society, California
- Peniel, now Greenville, Texas
- Peniel, West Virginia

=== India ===
- Peniel, Manipur

== People ==
- Peniel E. Joseph (born 1972), American historian and commentator on racial issues
- Peniel Mlapa (born 1988), Togolese footballer
- Peniel Shin (born 1993), American singer, member of the South Korean boy group BTOB

== Literature ==
- Peniel (collection), 1991 Australian poetry collection by Kevin Hart

== See also ==
- Pineal gland, a small endocrine gland in the brain of most vertebrates
