= Peniel Missionary Society =

Defunct missionary organisation

The Peniel Missionary Society was an interdenominational holiness missionary organisation that was started in Los Angeles, California in 1895 by Theodore Pollock Ferguson (1853–1920) and Manie Payne Ferguson (1850–1932) as an outgrowth of their Peniel Mission. It was merged with the World Gospel Mission in 1957.

== History of the Peniel Missionary Society ==
In addition to the expansion of the Peniel Mission in the United States of America, and its overseas territories: Alaska and Hawaii, eventually Peniel Missions were established overseas in Africa, Bolivia (1911); China (1909); Egypt, Guatemala, India, Mexico, and the Philippines. A separate organisation, The Peniel Missionary Society, under the control of Manie and Theodore Ferguson, was formed in 1895. The objective of the organisation was: "Mission work, as God shall lead, and as means shall be provided." (Dennis). The Mission operated on the faith mission model, with workers unsalaried, and guaranteed no financial support. Despite this, by 1911, the Peniel Missionary Society was operating in the following fields: India, North Africa (Egypt), Mexico, Central America (Guatemala), South America (Argentine Republic, and Bolivia), West Indies (Puerto Rico), Alaska, and Hawaii. (Dennis)

=== Egypt (1895-1957) ===
In August 1894, Miss Ella Shaw, who had helped establish the Peniel Mission at 308 Grant Avenue in San Francisco, California on 11 November 1893, and while a mission worker at the San Diego, California Peniel Mission, advised Mrs Ferguson that she and Miss Anna (Annie) Vansant were burdened to start a Peniel Mission in Port Said, Egypt. They testified: "We must go to the most wicked port in the world." (Traschel Africa 107)

On 20 October 1895, the first anniversary of the opening of the Peniel Hall in Los Angeles, Shaw and Vansant departed for Egypt, arriving there on 24 November 1895, to commence the first foreign branch of the Peniel Mission. (Love Slave, 232–233) Initially, they held religious services on British gunboats and coal ships waiting to go through the Suez Canal. "Prayer and persistence, aided by the Holy Spirit, brought bright converts." (Traschel, Africa, 107) Shaw left Egypt in early 1897 due to ill health. She later started the Peniel Mission in New York city, and eventually (as Mrs Melody) became the secretary-treasurer of the Peniel Missionary Society.

Among the activities of the Peniel missionaries in Egypt was teaching at the American School in Port Said. Vansant, seeing that there was no Protestant church nor any school for girls in Port Said, opened a small school later that year in her apartment, and even took in three children to live with her. In the evenings she taught an English Bible class for young men. Five months after the departure of Shaw, Mary Lyons and Miss M. Watson, arrived in Port Said. Vansant, who soon contracted tuberculosis and departed for the U.S., but died before reaching New York. In 1901, Lyons established the Bethel Orphanage Faith Mission in Port Said, with Vansant's mother, Mrs Marian A. Vansant, of Los Angeles, serving as the American Secretary of that mission. It was established to "bring the Mohammedans to a saving knowledge of Christ, and to save the children from a life of vice and sin, training them, with God's help, to be missionaries and Bible-women among their own people, and giving them a thorough Arabic and English education."(Dennis)

In 1897, Mrs Mary Richardson arrived in Port Said and began the construction of "a beautiful and commodious school building" near the beach on Kitchener Road (now Sharia 23 July) for the Peniel American School. (Traschel, 108–109). Later Miss Sarah Longhurst, an American pensioner, arrived as a missionary at age 58. She mastered Arabic and translated hymns for an Arabic hymn book. She was assisted by Mrs Jennie Ussher (who served 1921–1943), a former secretary for General William Booth, founder of the Salvation Army. After their deaths, both were buried in Port Said.

About 1930 increased enrolments due to the school having "the highest scholastic reputation in the city" (Traschel 109) resulted in King Fuad I of Egypt underwriting the expense of a new wing (named The King's Wing) of six additional classrooms. In 1931, Charlotte Warren and Edna Schendel arrived to teach at the Peniel school. After a year, Schendel returned to the U.S. because of lung troubles and died a few years later. Warren opened the first kindergarten in all of lower Egypt, with 150 children enrolled. Ill health compelled her to return to the U.S. at the end of one term of service. (Traschel, 109–110)

In 1935, Edward J. Higgins (November 26, 1864 – December 14, 1947), the recently retired third General of The Salvation Army (1929–1934), held revival meetings in the courtyard behind the Peniel School. As a result, there was formed the Salvation Army Sailors' Home, and the Salvation Army work in Alexandria, Egypt.

Before Longhurst died, Miss Christine Spurlin (later Christine Spurlin Schneider), an alumna of Bethany-Peniel Nazarene College (now Southern Nazarene University), an American school teacher, arrived in 1939 to begin her missionary service. She started weekly women's meetings. Converts attended the mission church (which was the first Protestant church in the city), which was located next to the Peniel School. Three smaller preaching points were established in Port Said, and another church was located in nearby Port Fouad, which was pastored by Pastor Massoud, who was educated by the Peniel Mission. At its peak in 1946, there were 600 female students at the Peniel American School. (Traschel 115) In 1949 Miss Ethyl Young began her missionary service at Peniel. Through the encouragement of Spurlin and Young, Rev. Samuel Doctorian (1930-2016), became a Peniel missionary to Lebanon.

New government schools and changed legislation reduced the enrolment of the school dramatically and created severe financial stress by 1956. During the Suez Crisis of November 1956, the school was closed until 5 January 1957. By then, there were only 240 girls enrolled. (Traschel 120–121) In 1957, responsibility for the Egyptian mission was assumed by the National Holiness Missionary Society, currently known as the World Gospel Mission. By 1965, Miss Laura Spurlin had leadership of the Mission in Port Said.(Directory of U.A.R. Personages 1965)

=== India (1896) ===
In June 1896 funds were donated to start the Peniel Mission in India. On 20 October 1896, the second anniversary of the opening of Peniel Hall, Mrs Anna M. Leach (who had helped pioneer the Mission at Grant Avenue in San Francisco in November 1893 and the one in Juneau, Alaska in June 1895) and Miss Rhodabaugh were commissioned to be the pioneer missionaries to India. They arrived in Bombay (now Mumbai)in December 1896. Leach died on 23 April 1899, the first Peniel missionary to die on a foreign mission field. By 1902 Peniel missionaries were running an orphanage for 20 girls at Jalgaon borrowing facilities from the Christian and Missionary Alliance. (CMA Report 1902, 133)

In 1909 Mrs Caroline P. Wallace and Miss Carrie A. Tennant of the Peniel Mission went to India to work with the Hindu Marriage Reform League (organised December 1909), an organization that opposed the practice of child brides and sought to raise the legal marriage age from 12 to 16.

Eventually the Dharangaon Mission Station was established in Dharangaon, East Khandesh, India for 30 years before being given to the Scandinavian Alliance Mission (now The Evangelical Alliance Mission (TEAM)). This included a Girls' School and Orphanage. "This big work proved to be too much for them. The Home Superintendent of the Peniel Mission, Mrs. Ferguson of Los Angeles, requested that the SAM take over."(Grauer 182)

=== Mexico ===
By 1900 there was a Peniel Mission located in Progreso, Yucatán in Mexico.(Knight, n.52)

=== Philippines ===
By 1902 there were two Peniel missionaries in Zamboanga (province) on the island of Mindanao in the recently acquired American territory of the Philippine Islands. There was also a Peniel Mission in Davao also on Mindanao. A chapel was constructed and medical ministry provided.

=== China (1909) ===
In 1909 Rev. Albert Kato Reiton (born 7 February 1882 in Baldwin, Wisconsin) and his first wife, Edna Greer Reiton (married 15 November 1909; died January 1912), established the South China Peniel Holiness Mission (later incorporated in 1951 as the China Peniel Missionary Society 中華便以利會) in Hong Kong in December 1909. Initially they moved to Macau to learn Cantonese. They then assisted in an orphanage in Shiu Hing (now Zhaoqing) on the shores of the Xijiang River (West River), but Edna's deteriorating health forced them to plan to return to the US for medical treatment. En route home, Edna died in January 1912 in Kobe, Japan of small pox.

Reiton married Rose Etta Femmer (died 25 July 1957 in Hong Kong) in Portland, Oregon on 20 January 1913 and they returned to Hong Kong on 4 March 1913. They served at the orphanage in Shiu Hing, before moving to Shatau (now Sha Tau Kok) to work as evangelists. On 22 November 1914 they opened the Yaumati Peniel Mission on Shanghai Street in Kowloon, Hong Kong. Soon this hall was too small to accommodate the crowds and the Mission was relocated to a former ginger factory. In 1928 the Reitons opened their first Bible Training School with Miss Alta Myers as head of the school. Initially twelve men and women enrolled. In 1930 another church was opened on Cheung Chau island 12 kilometres southwest of Hong Kong.

The Mission had ministries in Koonchung in Guangdong province, as well as in Kowloon, Shamshuipo, and Yaumati in the British Crown Colony of Hong Kong.

Among those baptised by Reiton was famous Chinese evangelist John Sung (29 September 1901 – 18 August 1944):

John Sung, the "Billy Graham of China", was asked to baptize at Peniel Mission Church in Hong Kong. "But I have never been baptized by immersion myself." Therefore, on his request, missionary Rev. Reiton baptized him first, and he in turn baptized 21 women and 12 men! (Encyclopedia of 15,000 Illustrations)

From 1939, the Reiton's daughter, Helen Elizabeth Reiton (born 12 June 1916 in Hong Kong; died 14 December 2005) and her husband, Robert (Bob) Bruce Hammond (born 1 March 1914 in Hong Kong; died 2 September 2002), whom she married on 16 June 1939 in Pasadena, California, returned to Hong Kong in November 1939 to assist the Reitons as missionaries. After the Japanese occupation of Hong Kong in 1942, the Peniel missionaries hid for 46 days, before being interned at the Stanley Internment Camp on Hong Kong island for six months before being repatriated back to the USA on 29 June 1942 - initially aboard the Asama Maru to Lourenço Marques, Portuguese East Africa (now Maputo, Mozambique). On 22 July 1942 they were transferred to the Swedish ship, "MS Gripsholm (1925)" for the final leg to New York.(Hammond)

After completing his education at the Pasadena College of the Church of the Nazarene in 1945, Bob Hammond started a missionary radio programme in June 1945 on KGER, a Christian radio station in Long Beach, California to raise funds for the ministry in China and throughout Asia. As many as 50,000 people listened on a regular basis. This programme continued for 46 years.

=== V.O.C.A. and other Asian Nations (1946) ===
After World War 2, the missionaries returned. They organised themselves as the Voice of China (later Voice of China and Asia - V.O.C.A.) Missionary Society, an interdenominational missionary agency based in Pasadena, California.

This agency is the international coordinating agency for the Peniel missions and churches in Taiwan, Hong Kong, Malaysia, South Korea (1951), and the Philippines. The mission is involved in evangelism, church planting, relief work, orphanages, leprosaria, Sunday School, the Peniel Theological College and Seminary (based in Busan, South Korea, and Peniel High School of the Arts (also located in Busan). Its mission magazine is the Voice of China and Asia Flashlight.

=== South America (1906-1920) ===
The Peniel Mission (Sociedad Peniel Hall) work in South America began as the result of the conversion of an Italian entrepreneur named Antonio Chiriotto (1830–1911), originally from Turin, Italy. After several years in Argentina and Peru, Chiriotto immigrated to Los Angeles, California, where he became wealthy, and was converted to the Christian faith.

After he had been in California for about ten years, a colporteur tried to sell him a Bible. Antonio denied him repeatedly. He did not want to have anything to do with the Bible. However, the tireless colporteur persisted in visiting him, and one day after a conversation that went on for several hours, Antonio burst into tears. He bought a Bible and began to go to the meetings at a little church called "Peniel." There he found his Savior. After some years, probably about 1906, Chiriotto felt that the Lord was calling him to begin a missionary work in Argentina, where he had first gone after emigrating from Italy.

==== Argentina (1906) ====
In 1906 Chiriotto went to Argentina. In Buenos Aires, he established an evangelical work, paying for all the expenses personally. Out of gratitude to the church where he had first met the Lord, he called the new church "Peniel Mission." However, under the Argentine laws at that time, it was impossible to develop the mission that was started there.

==== Bolivia (1911-1920) ====
Chiriotto, despite health problems, travelled to Bolivia in 1911 to establish a Peniel Mission. Upon his arrival in La Paz, he

saw the Aymara indigenous people as poor, exploited, ignorant, and forgotten. He had compassion on them and proposed taking education and salvation to them." The altitude and the cold climate of La Paz were not kind to him, and he fell ill and died in November 1911. However, before his death, Antonio wrote his last will and testament, leaving the sum of $30,000 to the "Peniel Society" that was composed of three men. They made sure Antonio Chiriotto's money was used for the purchase of a farm with the objective of obtaining the conversion and the education of the Indians.

The Huatajata (later spelled Guatajata) Farm (soon renamed Peniel Hall), located on the northeast shore of Lake Titicaca, about 105 km northwest of La Paz, was bought,

With the land came 48 heads of families and 275 serfs. Here it was possible to meet the desires and wishes of Antonio Chiriotto, to give the indigenous people education and a possible Christian experience. The farm itself, a 1,000-acre former hacienda on which vegetables and grain were cultivated and sheep herding was practiced, possessed great agricultural potential. At the time in which the Huatajata farm was acquired, the Indians were the burden-bearers—the human pack-animals of priests, politicians, and property-owners—who, in Bolivia, enjoyed few rights and social privileges. It was exclusively an Aymara community.

Initially the Bolivian government provided $2,000 annually to support the Mission in this endeavour. The directors of Peniel Hall Farm (two Methodist missionaries and a Baptist missionary) administrated the property for short periods, because it was difficult to operate the farm on Christian principles. Samuel Inman indicates that the reasons for the difficulties of this Mission included maladministration by missionaries, loss of Government support and sponsorship, inadequate financing, and leadership disagreements.

This work, so auspiciously begun a few years ago, has encountered all kinds of difficulties. The trustees seem not to have managed their responsibilities very well; difficulties have come up between them and the directors; the Government has become dissatisfied with the small amount of educational work done and has withdrawn its support. Most money was wasted in buying a motor-boat, which proved to be unusable; the funds destined for school work are being paid out in interest for a large amount of land, much of which is not usable. The directors have been changed several times, and at present they are "looking for an other member.I have not found a sadder situation than this one in all South America. It gives point to the fact that unquestionably the best way to do a permanent work in these countries is to organize it under a strong mission Board which has a permanent constituency, and has developed a policy of management that assures permanency and a business-like expenditure of funds. (Inman 80-81)

In light of these difficulties, on October 1, 1920, the Canadian Baptist Mission assumed complete responsibility for the administration of the property, and the last Peniel Mission outpost in South America was closed. In 1927 William Abel, a Native American, converted by the Oregon Yearly Meeting of the Society of Friends (Quakers), who had served as a missionary in the Philippines, was appointed to serve under the Peniel Mission in Bolivia, but died after a few months of small pox. (Williams 259–260)

=== Demise of the Peniel Missionary Society (1949) ===
In 1949 the Peniel Mission became a part of the present-day World Gospel Mission (Pounds 2).

== Sources and further reading ==
=== General ===
- Cary, William Walter. Story of the National Holiness Missionary Society. Chicago, Illinois: National Holiness Missionary Society, 1940.
- Carroll, Henry King. The Religious Forces of the United States Enumerated, Classified, and Described. C. Scribner's Sons, 1912. Page 470 Enumerates the statistics for the Peniel Mission at 703 members in 1910.
- Case, Jay R. "And Ever the Twain Shall Meet: The Holiness Missionary Movement and the Birth of World Pentecostalism, 1870–1920." Religion and American Culture 16: 2 (Summer 2006):125–160. "Case moves the study of Holiness/Pentecostal origins to a new level of sophistication by framing the story within a global process, paying special heed to notions of modernization and resistance to modernization. The article makes clear that Pentecostalism did not start in the United States but came here as part of an international movement."
- Clark, Elmer Talmage. The Small Sects in America: Their Historical, Theological, and Psychological Background. Revised Edition. Nashville: Abingdon-Cokesbury Press, 1949. See pages 79–80 for discussion of the Peniel Mission and TP and Manie P Ferguson.
- Cox, Mabel Holmes. The Lady Pioneer: Pioneer Missionary Work in Alaska and the Northwest. Roseburg, Oregon: n.p., 1968. Autobiography of Peniel Mission missionary who served at several different sites. Includes photographs, including ones of Mr. and Mrs. T. P. Ferguson, founders of the Peniel Mission.
- Darling, Olive M., compiler. Converts of Peniel Missions. n.p., n.d.
- Dennis, James S. and Charles H. Fahs, eds. World Atlas of Christian Missions: Containing a Directory of Missionary Societies, a Classified Summary of Statistics, an Index of Mission Stations, and Maps Showing the Location of Mission Stations Throughout the World. Rev. ed. New York: Student Volunteer Movement for Foreign Missions, 1911. Online edition: Gives details of Peniel Missionary Society.
- Edwards, Fred E. The Role of the Faith Mission: A Brazilian Case Study. Pasadena, California: William Carey Library, 1971.
- Ferguson, Manie Payne. Echoes From Beulah. Los Angeles: T. P. & M. P. Ferguson, 1913. Musical Score. 268 pp.
- Ferguson, Manie Payne. "Peniel Missionary Work" in Faith Tonic: 1 and 2 Combined; being a series of articles by different writers, exemplifying God's dealings with those who trust Him, 3-35. Compiled by Leander Lycurgus Pickett. Louisville. Kentucky: Pentecostal Publishing Company, c.1920s. 102 pp.
- Ferguson, Manie Payne. T.P. Ferguson: The Love Slave of Jesus Christ and His People and Founder of Peniel Missions (c.1920). 240 pages. Includes 39 poems by Ferguson, a photo of T.P. Ferguson (page 17), biography of the life of T.P. Ferguson, notes from T.P. Ferguson's diary for 1881-1882 (pages 95–103), Bible readings and notes by T.P. Ferguson (pages 107–219), Peniel Missionary Work (pages 220–238), and an update of "Peniel Missionary Work" (page 239).
- Goddard, Burton L., ed. Encyclopedia of Modern Christian Missions; the Agencies. Camden, New Jersey: Thomas Nelson, 1967. See page 526 for article on "Peniel Missions, Inc."
- Hittson, Paul A. History of Peniel Missions. Homeland, California: Paul A. Hittson, 1975.
- Jones, Charles Edwin. A Guide to the Study of the Holiness Movement . Metuchen, New Jersey: Scarecrow Press, 1974.
- Jones, Charles Edwin. Perfectionist Persuasion: The Holiness Movement and American Methodism, 1867-1936. Metuchen, New Jersey: Scarecrow Press, 1974. Section on the Peniel Mission: 243–244.
- Jones, Charles Edwin. The Wesleyan Holiness Movement: A Comprehensive Guide. Volume One: Parts I-III. Lanham, Maryland: Scarecrow Press, 2005. See pages 734-735 for article on the Peniel Missions.
- Lewis, James R., editor. The Encyclopedia of Cults, Sects, and New Religions. 2nd ed. Prometheus Books, 2001. See page 561 for encyclopedic article about the Peniel Missions and the Fergusons.
- Melody, Ella Shaw. Songs of Grace: A Book of Poems. Peniel Herald Publishing Company, 1941. Mrs Melody was (as Ella Shaw) the pioneer Peniel missionary to both Port Said, Egypt and New York city, and later the secretary-treasurer of the Peniel Missionary Society in Los Angeles.
- Melton, J. Gordon, editor. The Encyclopedia of American Religions: Vol. 1. Tarrytown, New York: Triumph Books, 1991. Chapter: Holiness Family; section: 19th Century Holiness; pg. 214 for article regarding the Peniel Missions and the Fergusons.
- Morgan, Wilma. Glimpses of Four Continents: Being an Account of the Travels of Richard Cope Morgan. Morgan & Scott, 1911. See page 74 for reference to the Fergusons, GB Studd and the Peniel Mission.
- Pickett, Leander Lycurgus, comp. Faith Tonic: 1 and 2 Combined; being a series of articles by different writers, exemplifying God's dealings with those who trust Him. Louisville. Kentucky: Pentecostal Publishing Company, c.1920s. 102 pp. Includes article entitled: "Peniel Missionary Work" by Manie Payne Ferguson, pp. 3–35.
- Piepkorn, Arthur Carl. Profiles in Belief: The Religious Bodies of the United States and Canada. Harper Collins, 1978. See page 7 for Bresee's involvement in the Peniel Mission.
- Pounds, Michael E. "The Beginning Days." Peniel Herald, Number 5, 1986. Concerns the Peniel Missions and the work of T. P. and Manie Ferguson. Reference to Haldor Lillenas.
- St. John, Burton, ed. Foreign Missions Year Book of North America 1920. Foreign Missions Conference of North America Committee of reference and counsel, 1919. See pages 202 and 268 regarding the Peniel Missionary Society.
- "The Fifth Annual Report of the Christian & Missionary Alliance". Presented at the meeting of the Board, 1902.
- Williams, Walter R. and J. C. Brown, The Rich Heritage of Quakerism. 3rd ed. Epilogue and edited by Paul Anderson. Newberg, Oregon: Barclay Press, 2006. Pages 258-259 outlines the involvement of Oregon Quaker William Abel in the Peniel Mission in Bolivia from 1927.

=== Egypt ===
- Collins, Robert O. and Peter Duignan. Americans in Africa: A Preliminary Guide to American Missionary Archives and Library Manuscript Collections on Africa. Stanford, California: Hoover Institution on War, Revolution, and Peace, Stanford University, 1963. See page 28 regarding Peniel Missionary work in Africa, especially Egypt.
- Janes, Don Carlos. A Trip Abroad: An Account of a Journey to the Earthly Canaan and the Land of the Ancient Pharaohs To Which Are Appended A Brief Consideration of the Geography and History of Palestine, and a Chapter on Churches of Christ in Great Britain. 1905. Reprint: Dodo Press, 2007. On-line version: References Peniel Mission in Port Said: "The Peniel Mission is conducted by two American ladies."
- Latourette, Kenneth Scott. A History of the Expansion of Christianity. Volume 6: The Great Century: North Africa and Asia: 1800 to 1914. Harper Brothers, 1944. Page 27 summarises ministry of both the Peniel American Mission and the Bethel Orphanage in Port Said, Egypt.
- Longhurst, Sarah. Reminiscences of My Life in Egypt: During Thirty-one Years of Missionary Work, with Addresses Given to the Egyptian people. Ottawa, Canada : Holiness Movement Book and Pub. House, n.d. Longhurst served as a Peniel missionary in Port Said, Egypt.
- Prayer Union for Egypt and Arabia, Asia Minor and Turkey, Syria and Palestine. Blessed be Egypt: A Challenge to Faith for the Mohammedan World. Nile Mission Press, 1903. Page 31 for origins of Peniel Mission in Port Said, Egypt.
- Trachsel, Laura. Kindled Fires in Africa. Marion, Indiana: World Gospel Mission, 1960. See pages 107-121 for description of the origins and development of the Peniel Mission in Egypt.
- Watson, Charles Roger. Egypt and the Christian Crusade. Young People's Missionary Movement, 1907. Page 204 references both the Peniel American Mission and the Bethel Orphanage in Port Said, Egypt: "In Port Said, we find the Peniel American Mission and the Bethel Orphanage, both doing work among children. There are a number of homes and hostels...". Page 275 gives statistics.

=== India ===
- Fuller, Henry. A Californian Circling the Globe: Illustrated from Photographs. Los Angeles, California: Nazarene, 1904. See pages 264 and 301 for references to the ministry of the Peniel Mission in India, where they were training boys and girls in 1902.
- Grauer, Otto Christopher. Fifty Wonderful Years Missionary Service in Foreign Lands: Scandinavian Alliance Mission 1890 - JUBILEE - 1940. Scandinavian Alliance Mission, 1940. See Pages 178 and 182. References the Dharangaon Mission Station operated by the Peniel Missionary Society in Dharangaon, East Khandesh, India for 30 years before being given to the Scandinavian Alliance Mission (now The Evangelical Alliance Mission (TEAM)). This included a Girls' School and Orphanage. "This big work proved to be too much for them. The Home Superintendent of the Peniel Mission, Mrs. Ferguson of Los Angeles, requested that the SAM take over."(182)
- Ray, Benoy Gopal. Religious Movements in Modern Bengal. Santineketan, India: Visva-Bharati, 1965. See page 211 for Peniel work.

=== Mexico ===
- Knight, Alan. "Mexican Peonage: What Was It and Why Was It?" Journal of Latin American Studies 18:1 (May 1986):41-74. See reference to the Fred J. Smith and the Peniel Mission in Progreso, Yucatán, Mexico.

=== Philippines ===
- Stanley, Peter W. Reappraising an Empire: New Perspectives on Philippine-American History. Harvard University Asia Center, 1984. Page 144 refers to the Peniel Mission as a small holiness group operating in Zamboanga, Mindanao.

=== China ===
- Boynton, Charles Luther and Charles Dozier Boynton. 1936 Handbook of the Christian Movement in China Under Protestant Auspices. National Christian Council of China. Kwang Hsueh Publishing, 1936. See page 329 for the South China Peniel Holiness Mission.
- Hammond, Helen. Bondservants: Missionaries' Experiences During the Siege of Hong Kong and History of V.O.C.A. Peniel Missions. 10th ed. Pasadena, California: Voice of China & Asia, 1978.
- Hammond, Robert Bruce. Bondservants of the Lord: Our Experiences During the Siege of Hong Kong, Internment in Stanley Prison Concentration Camp, the Establishment of Voice of China and Asia Missionary Work. 9th ed. Pasadena, California: Voice of China and Asia Missionary Society, 1963.
- Latourette, Kenneth Scott. A History of Christian Missions in China. Macmillan. 1929. Indicates on page 600 that the South China Peniel Holiness Mission began in 1910.
- Luzzatto, Rola and Joseph Walker, eds. Hong Kong Who's Who: An Almanac of Personalities and Their Comprehensive Histories 1970-1973. See page 393 for reference to Rev Albert Kato Reito, the founder of the China Peniel Missionary Society.
- Lyall, Leslie T. John Sung: Flame for God in the Far East. China Inland Mission, 1954. See pages 90–96 for the account of Sung's evangelistic campaign at the Peniel Mission church in Hong Kong. Includes account of Rev Reiton baptised Sung (95).
- Rees, Seth Cook and Paul S. Rees. The Wings of the Morning: A Record of Recent Travel. (Also known as Here and There in Many Lands). Greensboro, North Carolina: Winfred R. Cox, 1926. Online edition: See page 46 for an account of Rees' visit to the Peniel Mission in Hong Kong and fellowship with the Reitons. Rees was a prominent leader in the American Holiness Movement.

=== Bolivia ===
- Copplestone, J. Tremayne. History of Methodist Missions. Volume 4: Twentieth-century Perspectives: The Methodist Episcopal Church, 1896-1939. United Methodist Church, 1973. Discusses Peniel Hall Farm in Bolivia (1046–1050), and the involvement of Methodist James H. Wenberg with difficulties with the Peniel Hall board from 1913 to 1920 (246-250).
- Escobar, Samuel E. Changing Tides: Latin America and World Mission Today. The American Society of Missiology Series 32. Maryknoll: Orbis, 2002. Extensive summary of the Huatajata hacienda reforms at Peniel Hall Farm in Bolivia and their significance in agrarian reform and Christian missions in Bolivia.
- Goytia, Rodriguez Jaime, ed. Principios De La Obra Bautista En Bolivia. Cochabamba: Imprenta Offset, 1985; "Principios de la Obra Evangélica en Bolivia: Antonio Chiriotto," El Centinela Boliviano (February 1955) 6–7.
- Hamilton, Keith E. Church Growth in the High Andes. Lucknow, India: Lucknow Publishing House, 1962. Page 58 discusses Peniel Hall Farm (Guatajata hacienda) as "the most noteworthy piece of mission work in Bolivia."
- Inman, Samuel Guy. "Report of a Visit to Mexico, Cuba and South America, March–October, 1917." Printed for Private Circulation. New York: Committee on Cooperation in Latin America, 1918. Online Edition: Inman was the executive secretary of the Committee on Cooperation in Latin America. See pages 80–81 for overview of Peniel Hall Farm in Bolivia, and reasons for dissolution of this Mission: maladministration by missionaries, loss of Government support and sponsorship, inadequate financing, and leadership disagreements.
- Commission on World Mission and Evangelism of the World Council of Churches. International Review of Mission (1944): 67 references Peniel Hall Farm in Bolivia.
- Justice, C. Anderson. An Evangelical Saga: Baptists and their Precursors in Latin America. Xulon Press, 2005. English translation of sections from Historia de los Bautistas Tomo III by Justo Anderson (El Paso, Texas: Casa Bautista de Publicaciones, 1990). Pages 305-332 discuss Baptists origins in Bolivia, and includes origins of Peniel Missions in Argentina and Bolivia.
- Keller, Frank L. "Finca Ingavi: A Medieval Survival on the Bolivian Altiplano". Economic Geography 26: 1 (January 1950):37-50. Refers to Peniel Hall Farm in Bolivia.
- Nacho L., Arturo. "Agrarian Reform in Huatajata: The Peniel Hall Experience", pages 55–74 in Bridging Cultures and Hemispheres: The Legacy of Archibald Reekie and Canadian Baptists in Bolivia. Edited by William H. Brackney. Macon, Georgia: Smyth & Helwys, 1997. Online edition: See especially pages 57–60 for the origins of Peniel Mission work in Argentina and Bolivia, and page 67 for a photograph of Peniel Hall Farm at Huatajata, from Lake Titicaca.

=== Congo ===
- Stonelake, Alfred R. Congo: Past and Present. World Dominion Press, 1937. Page 152 suggests the Peniel Missionary Society presence in the Congo by 1937.

== Periodicals ==
- Peniel Herald. Official organ of the Peniel Mission. Vol. 59, No. 1 & 2 (Jan.-Feb. 1957)

== Archival Material ==
- "Papers of Charles Henry Troutman, Jr. Collection III". Billy Graham Center Archives, Wheaton, Illinois. The IVCF-USA folders are letters and reports from other Christian organizations about evangelism and mission activities around the world. For example, Folder 5-34 has letters and critiques of the Peniel movement.
- "Records of the Peniel Missions, 1917". Yale University Library, New Haven, Connecticut.
