= Hanson Historic District =

- U.S. National Register of Historic Places
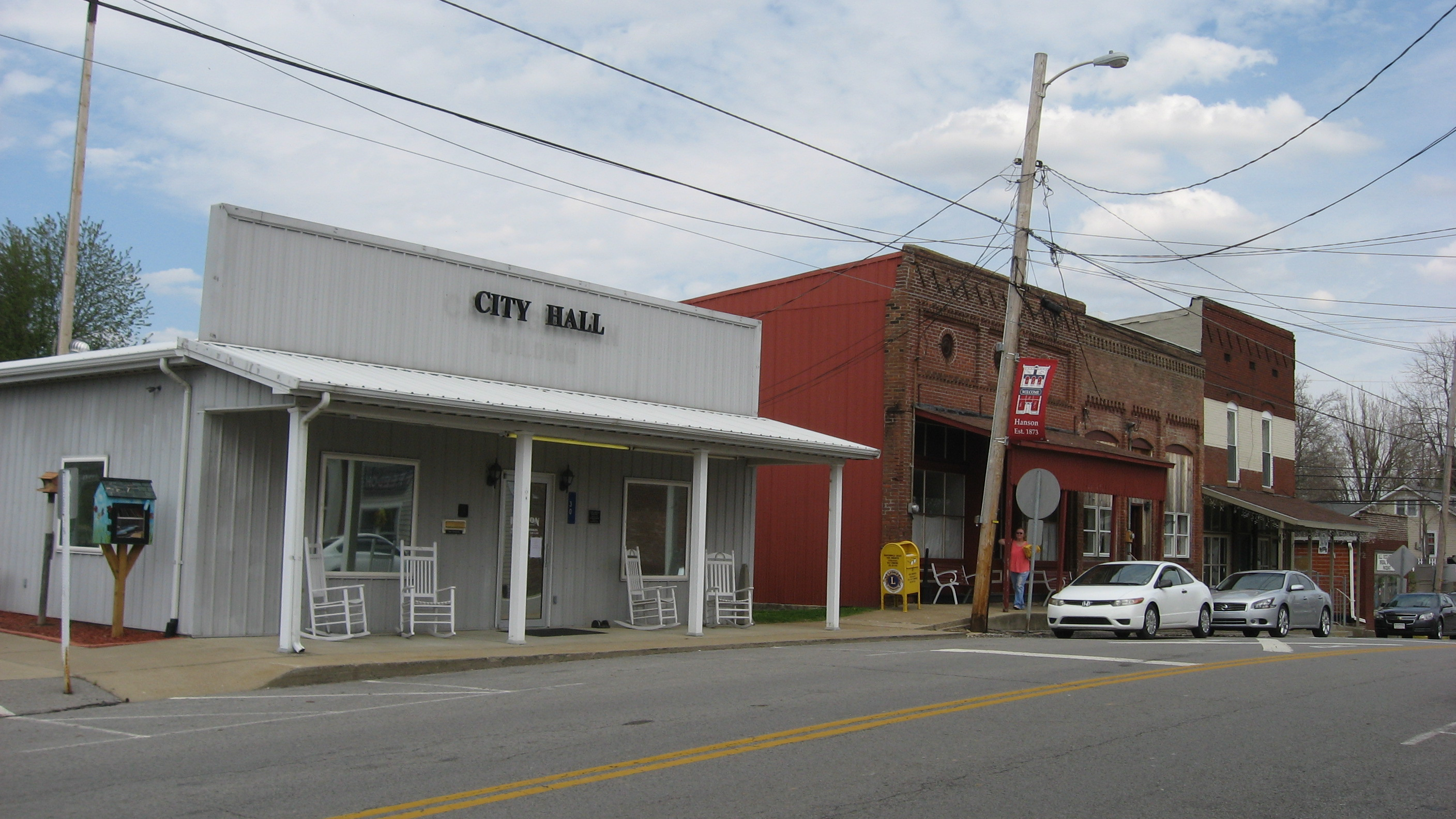

- Location within Kentucky Location within the United States
- Location: Roughly Main St. from US 41 to E. Railroad St., Hanson, Kentucky
- Coordinates: 37°25′02″N 87°28′54″W
- Area: 2.2 acres (0.89 ha)
- Architectural style: Chicago, Italianate, Commercial Style
- MPS: Hopkins County MPS
- NRHP reference No.: 88002711
- Added to NRHP: December 13, 1988

The Hanson Historic District, in Hanson, Kentucky, is a 2.2 acres (0.89 ha) historic district including 11 contributing buildings which was listed on the National Register of Historic Places in 1988.

It includes roughly one block of Main St. from U.S. Route 41 to E. Railroad St. in Hanson.

The district was deemed notable as "a significant collection of late 19th and early 20th century commercial buildings"; the buildings are mostly one- and two-story vernacular commercial brick buildings built between 1890 and 1910. Some of the storefronts have original cast iron columns or pilasters with floral designs.
