= Joshua Hall McIlvaine =

American clergyman

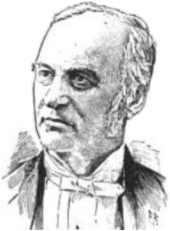
- Born: 1815; Lewes, Delaware
- Died: January 30, 1897 (aged 81); Princeton, New Jersey
- Occupation: Clergyman

Joshua Hall McIlvaine (1815–1897) was an American clergyman known for his work in philology and orientalism.

== Early life and career ==
Joshua Hall McIlvaine was born in Lewes, Delaware in 1815. He graduated from Princeton in 1837 and from the theological seminary there in 1840. He then pastored successively of Presbyterian churches at Little Falls, Utica, and Rochester, New York. From 1860 to 1870 he was professor of belles-lettres at Princeton. From 1870 to 1874 he was pastor of the High Street church in Newark, New Jersey. While at Rochester, he opposed evangelist Charles Finney. When he saw the results that followed Finney's evangelical work, he changed his mind.

In 1859, he gave six lectures at the Smithsonian Institution on comparative philology in relation to ethnology. His presentations gave an analysis of the structure of the Sanskrit language, and the process of deciphering cuneiform inscriptions.

In 1869 he delivered a course on social science in Philadelphia under the auspices of the University of Pennsylvania.

McIlvaine was a member of the American oriental society, and in 1854 the University of Rochester awarded him the degree of D.D. In 1887 he founded Evelyn College for Women at Princeton. Rumors of sexual scandal unrelated to him forced its closure shortly after his death. He wrote many religious and scientific articles.

He died at his home in Princeton, New Jersey on January 30, 1897.

== Notable publications ==
- The Tree of the Knowledge of Good and Evil (1854)
- A Nation's Right to Worship God (1859)
- Elocution, the Sources and Elements of its Power (1870)
- The Wisdom of Holy Scripture, with Reference to Sceptical Objections (1883)
- The Wisdom of the Apocalypse (1886)
