= Theodore Pollock Ferguson =

American minister

Theodore Pollock Ferguson (January 10, 1853 – July 12, 1920) was a pioneer leader in the American Holiness Movement, a Christian evangelist and social worker who co-founded the Peniel Mission and Peniel Missionary Society.

Ferguson was born on January 10, 1853, in Mansfield, Ohio, in Richland County, Ohio. He was converted in 1875 in Oberlin, Ohio, through the preaching of evangelist Charles Finney. He became a minister in the United Presbyterian church. In 1879 he relocated to Santa Barbara, California. In 1880 he was entirely sanctified during a holiness revival meeting in California. He became an itinerant preacher. On June 7, 1883, he married Manie Payne Ferguson. They moved to Los Angeles, California, during the boom of 1885–86. On 11 November 1886 they founded the Los Angeles Mission, later named the Peniel Mission.

Ferguson died on 12 July 1920 in Los Angeles.
