= Charles Grandison Finney =

American minister and writer (1792–1875)

The Reverend Charles Grandison Finney
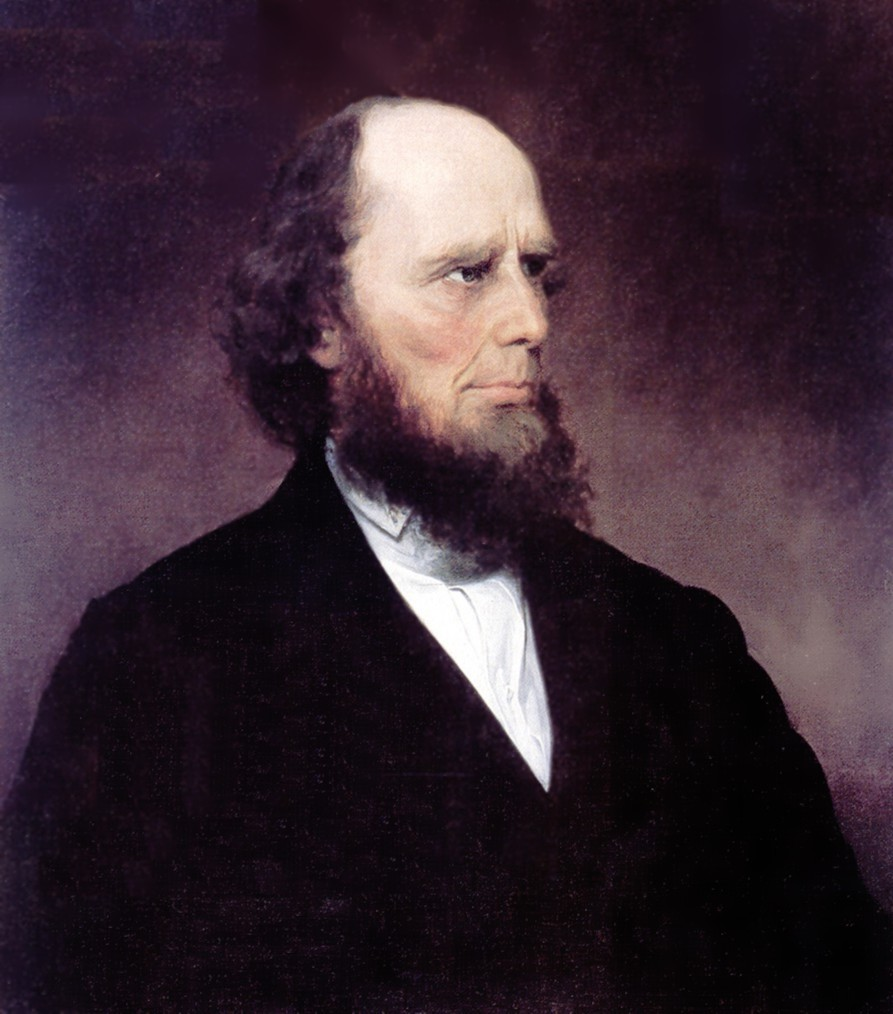

2nd President of Oberlin College
- In office 1851 – 1866
- Preceded by: Asa Mahan
- Succeeded by: James Fairchild

Personal details
- Born: August 29, 1792 Warren, Connecticut, U.S.
- Died: August 16, 1875 (aged 82) Oberlin, Ohio, U.S.
- Spouses: Lydia Root Andrews (m. 1824; died 1847); Elizabeth Ford Atkinson (m. 1848; died 1863); Rebecca Allen Rayl (m. 1865)
- Profession: Presbyterian minister, evangelist, revivalist, author
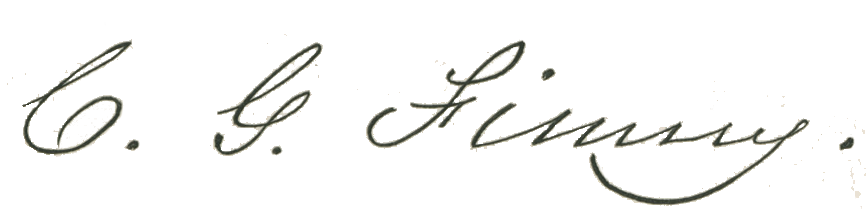
- Signature

Charles Grandison Finney (August 29, 1792 – August 16, 1875) was an American Presbyterian minister and leader in the Second Great Awakening in the United States. He has been called the "Father of Old Revivalism". Finney was a member of the New School Presbyterians and a part of the Holiness Movement.

Finney was best known as a passionate revivalist preacher from 1825 to 1835 in the Burned-over District in Upstate New York and Manhattan, an opponent of Old School Presbyterian theology, an advocate of Christian perfectionism, and a religious writer.

His religious views led him, together with several other evangelical leaders, to promote social reforms, such as abolitionism and equal education for women and African Americans. From 1835 he taught at Oberlin College of Ohio, which accepted students without regard to race or sex. He served as its second president from 1851 to 1865, and its faculty and students were activists for abolitionism, the Underground Railroad, and universal education.

== Early life ==
Born in Warren, Connecticut, on August 29, 1792, Finney was the youngest of nine children. The son of farmers who moved to the upstate frontier of Jefferson County, New York, after the American Revolutionary War, Finney never attended college. His leadership abilities, musical skill, 6 ft 3 in (1.91 m) height, and piercing eyes gained him recognition in his community. He and his family attended the Baptist church in Henderson, New York, where the preacher led emotional, revival-style meetings. The Baptists and the Methodists displayed fervor in the early 19th century. He "read the law", studying as an apprentice to become a lawyer under Benjamin Wright. In Adams, New York, he entered the congregation of George Washington Gale and became the director of the church choir. After a dramatic conversion experience and baptism into the Holy Spirit he gave up legal practice to preach the Gospel. As a young man, Finney was a Master Mason, but after his conversion, he left the group as antithetical to Christianity and was active in anti-Masonic movements.

In 1821, Finney started studies at 29 under George Washington Gale, to become a licensed minister in the Presbyterian Church. Like his teacher Gale, he took a commission for six months of a Female Missionary Society, located in Oneida County. "I went into the northern part of Jefferson County and began my labors at Evans' Mills, in the town of Le Ray."

When Gale moved to a farm in Western, Oneida County, New York, Finney accompanied him and, along with Theodore Dwight Weld, worked on Gale's farm in exchange for instruction, a forerunner of Gale's Oneida Institute. He had many misgivings about the fundamental doctrines taught in Presbyterianism. He moved to New York City in 1832, where he was minister of the Chatham Street Chapel and took the breathtaking step of barring all slave owners and traders from Communion. Since the Chatham Street Chapel was not a church but a theater "fitted up" to serve as a church, a new Broadway Tabernacle was built for him in 1836 that was "the largest Protestant house of worship in the country." In 1835, he became the professor of systematic theology at the recently created Oberlin Collegiate Institute in Oberlin, Ohio.

== Revivals ==
Finney was active as a revivalist from 1825 to 1835 in Jefferson County and for a few years in Manhattan. In 1830–1831, he led a revival in Rochester, New York, which has been noted as inspiring other revivals of the Second Great Awakening. A leading pastor in New York who was converted in the Rochester meetings gave the following account of the effects of Finney's meetings in that city: "The whole community was stirred. Religion was the topic of conversation in the house, in the shop, in the office and on the street. The only theater in the city was converted into a livery stable; the only circus into a soap and candle factory. Grog shops were closed; the Sabbath was honored; the sanctuaries were thronged with happy worshippers; a new impulse was given to every philanthropic enterprise; the fountains of benevolence were opened, and men lived to good."

Finney was known for his innovations in preaching and the conduct of religious meetings, which often impacted entire communities. Innovations included having women pray out loud in public meetings of mixed sexes, the introduction of the "anxious seat" in which those considering becoming Christians could sit to receive prayer, and public censure of individuals by name in sermons and prayers. He was also known for his extemporaneous preaching.

Finney "had a deep insight into the almost interminable intricacies of human depravity.... He poured the floods of gospel love upon the audience. He took short-cuts to men's hearts, and his trip-hammer blows demolished the subterfuges of unbelief."

Disciples of Finney included Theodore Weld, John Humphrey Noyes, and Andrew Leete Stone.

== Abolitionism ==
In addition to becoming a widely popular Christian evangelist, Finney was involved with social reforms, particularly the abolitionist movement. Finney frequently denounced slavery from the pulpit, called it a "great national sin," and refused Holy Communion to slaveholders.

== President of Oberlin College ==
In 1835, the wealthy silk merchant and benefactor Arthur Tappan (1786–1865) offered financial backing to the new Oberlin Collegiate Institute (as Oberlin College had been known until 1850), and he invited Finney, on the recommendation of abolitionist Theodore Dwight Weld (1803–1895), to establish its theological department. After much wrangling, Finney accepted on the conditions that he be allowed to continue to preach in New York, the school admit black people, and free speech be guaranteed at Oberlin. After more than a decade, he was selected as its second president, serving from 1851 to 1866. (He had already served as acting president in 1849.) Oberlin was the first American college to accept women and black people as students in addition to white men. From its early years, its faculty and students were active in the abolitionist movement. They participated together with people of the town in biracial efforts to help fugitive slaves on the Underground Railroad and to resist the Fugitive Slave Act of 1850. Many slaves escaped to Ohio across the Ohio River from Kentucky, which made Ohio a critical area for their passage to freedom.

== Personal life ==
Finney was twice widowed and married three times. In 1824, he married Lydia Root Andrews (1804–1847) while he lived in Jefferson County. They had six children together. In 1848, a year after Lydia's death, he married Elizabeth Ford Atkinson (1799–1863) in Ohio. In 1865, he married Rebecca Allen Rayl (1824–1907), also in Ohio. Each of Finney's three wives accompanied him on his revival tours and joined him in his evangelistic efforts. He died in 1875 age 82.

Finney's great-grandson, also named Charles Grandison Finney, became a famous author.

== Theology ==
Finney was a New School Presbyterian, and his theology was similar to that of Nathaniel William Taylor. In the field of soteriology, he denied the doctrine of total depravity, implying humans can please God without the intervention of his grace. Some consider his stance as Pelagianism. Finney affirmed both the external and internal work of the Holy Spirit within the context of salvation, though with the sole purpose of motivation. This is why theologian Christopher Bounds call his stance "soft semi-Pelagianism", although recognizing its mere Pelagian nature.

Finney's theory of atonement combines principles from different historical theories, notably the moral influence theory, but can't be associated exclusively with either of them.

Finney was an advocate of perfectionism, the doctrine that through complete faith in Christ believers could receive a "second blessing of the Holy Spirit" and reach Christian perfection, a higher level of sanctification. For Finney, that meant living in obedience to God's law and loving God and one's neighbors but was not a sinless perfection. For Finney, even sanctified Christians are susceptible to temptation and capable of sin. Finney believed that it is possible for Christians to backslide.

A major theme of his preaching was the need for what he called conversion. He also focused on the responsibilities that converts had to dedicate themselves to disinterested benevolence and to work to build the kingdom of God on earth. He taught that preachers had vital roles in producing revival, and wrote in 1835, "A revival is not a miracle, or dependent on a miracle, in any sense. It is a purely philosophical result of the right use of the constituted means."

Finney's eschatology was postmillennial, meaning he believed the Millennium (a thousand-year reign of Christ on Earth) would begin before Christ's Second Coming. Finney believed Christians could bring in the Millennium by ridding the world of "great and sore evils". Frances FitzGerald wrote, "In his preaching the emphasis was always on the ability of men to choose their own salvation, to work for the general welfare, and to build a new society."

== Criticisms ==
Finney's theology has been sharply criticized, notably by Reformed authors, for what they regard as Pelagian tendencies in his theology, including his rejection of original sin and penal substitutionary atonement.

This criticism began during his lifetime. In 1835, Albert Baldwin Dod, an Old School Presbyterian, reviewed Finney's Lectures on Revivals of Religion and rejected it as theologically unsound. A defender of Reformed orthodoxy, Dod was especially critical of Finney's view of total depravity. In the 1840s, the theologian John Williamson Nevin likewise criticized Finney's "new measures" and the theology behind them as Pelagian.

Later, Benjamin Warfield, a professor of theology at Princeton Theological Seminary, wrote that "God might be eliminated from it [Finney's theology] entirely without essentially changing its character."

== In popular culture ==
In Charles W. Chesnutt's short story "The Passing of Grandison" (1899), published in the collection The Wife of His Youth and Other Stories of the Color Line, the enslaved hero is named "Grandison", likely an allusion to the well-known abolitionist.

The Charles Finney School was established in Rochester, New York, in 1992.

Finney is included as a political figure in the video game Victoria 3.

== See also ==
- Manie Payne Ferguson
- Theodore Pollock Ferguson
- Keith Green
- Joshua Hall McIlvaine
- Nathaniel William Taylor

== Sources ==
- Bounds, Christopher T. (2011). "How are People Saved? The Major Views of Salvation with a Focus on Wesleyan Perspectives and their Implications". Wesley and Methodist Studies. 3: 31–54. doi:10.5325/weslmethstud.3.2011.0031. JSTOR 42909800. S2CID 171804441.
- FitzGerald, Frances (2017). The Evangelicals: The Struggle to Shape America. Simon and Schuster. ISBN 978-1439131336.
- Smith, Jay E. (1992). "The Theology Of Charles Finney: A System Of Self-Reformation" (PDF). TRINJ. 13: 61–93.
- Todd, Obbie Tyler (2020). "Rethinking Finney: The Two Sides of Charles Grandison Finney's Doctrine of Atonement" (PDF). JETS. 63 (2): 332–43.
