= Nazarene Publishing House =

Publishing arm of the Church of the Nazarene

- Parent company: Church of the Nazarene
- Founded: 1912
- Country of origin: United States
- Headquarters location: Kansas City, Missouri
- Publication types: Books, sheet music
- Imprints: Lillenas
- Official website: www.thefoundrypublishing.com

Nazarene Publishing House (NPH), the publishing arm of the Church of the Nazarene, is the world's largest publisher of Wesleyan-Holiness literature. NPH was located on Troost Avenue in Kansas City, Missouri, from 1912 until its move in February 2016. At the peak of its printing capabilities, NPH printed more than 25 million pieces of literature each year, and processed more than 250,000 orders each year from more than 11,000 churches from many denominations. As the publishing industry began to change with the onset of digital distribution, NPH began to scale itself accordingly. In early 2016, NPH moved its administrative offices from the Troost facility to a location a short distance away, while maintaining ownership of the printing facility at its original location on Troost. They also obtained a new President Mark Brown.

In February 2018, The Nazarene Publishing House changed its DBA name to The Foundry Publishing, maintaining its use of NPH for non-North American entities.

== History ==
The Third General Assembly of the Church of the Nazarene held in Nashville, Tennessee in 1911 recommended that the infant denomination's three publishing companies (then located in Rhode Island, Texas, and Los Angeles, California) each founded by a different Nazarene parent body, consolidate into “one central publishing company” and merge their three papers into one strong paper. The newly created Pentecostal Nazarene Publishing House was sited at 2923 Troost Avenue, Kansas City, Missouri, in 1912, with Clarence J. Kinne, a Nazarene ordained minister, as its first manager.

The Herald of Holiness, the new weekly paper, edited by B. F. Haynes, appeared for the first time in April 1912. The Other Sheep (later World Mission) magazine began publication in 1913 under founding editor Charles Allen McConnell (born 19 June 1860 in Valparaiso, Indiana; died c.1950), who was NPH manager from 1916 to 1918. Both magazines were published until 1999, when they were discontinued in favor of Holiness Today, a new publication. In the meantime, Spanish, Portuguese, and French editions of Herald of Holiness appeared over the years.

Lillenas Publishing, which was founded in Indianapolis, Indiana, in 1925 by Nazarene minister and composer Haldor Lillenas (born 19 November 1885 at Stord Island, Norway; died 18 August 1959 at Aspen, Colorado). Lillenas was purchased by NPH in 1930.

Restructure In October, 2014, a preliminary decision was announced by the denomination's Board of General Superintendents to shut down NPH on December 1, 2014, citing “shifting cultural circumstances including changes in the church”. However, on November 7, 2014, the Board of General Superintendents announced that rather than closing, NPH would undergo a restructure.

Beginning in 2017, NPH began the rebranding process to become The Foundry Publishing.

== Relationship with the Church of the Nazarene ==
NPH is a separate corporate entity from the Church of the Nazarene, although it is accountable to the church. NPH has a board of directors and is also accountable to one of the six General Superintendents of the Church of the Nazarene who has oversight of NPH.

== NPH imprints ==
NPH publishes a variety of books, music and materials.

=== Beacon Hill Press of Kansas City ===
The primary label under which books are published is Beacon Hill Press of Kansas City.

=== Lillenas ===
Lillenas Publishing Company is one of the largest church music publishers in the world, providing dozens of new musical arrangements each year. Lillenas owns more than 20,000 song copyrights. Lillenas' primary focus is creating and providing "worship resource for the medium and small church", and serves more than 50,000 churches around the world each year.

Lillenas is a not-for-profit organization. Lillenas profits go to support mission efforts around the world including education, compassionate ministries, as well as other humanitarian efforts.

=== WordAction ===
Sunday school curriculum was published under the label WordAction until the company changed its name in 2018. The first use of The Foundry Publishing for Sunday school curriculum was September 2018 with the release of new curriculum for adults. The WordAction Publishing Company was a not-for-profit organization that provided Bible-based, Wesleyan-Holiness curriculum resources for all ages. Its resources were designed through the cooperative efforts of The Salvation Army, Church of the Nazarene, Wesleyans, Evangelical Friends, Free Methodists, and Evangelical United Methodists. WordAction was a part of the Nazarene Publishing House/The Foundry Publishing and became the world's leading provider of holiness Sunday School lessons and curriculum for children, youth, and adult Sunday School, as well as a leading provider of small group resources and devotional material for family or personal daily devotional times.

=== Barefoot Ministries ===
Youth ministry resources were published under the label Barefoot Ministries.

=== Casa Nazarena de Publicaciones ===
Spanish materials are produced by Casa Nazarena de Publicaciones.
