= Phineas F. Bresee =

American Christian leader (1838–1915)

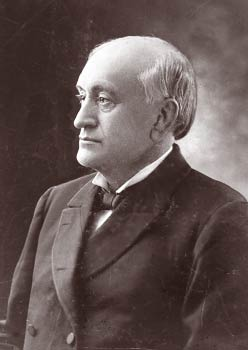
Bresee

Phineas F. Bresee (December 31, 1838 – November 13, 1915) was an American minister and the primary founder of the Church of the Nazarene He was also the founding president of Point Loma Nazarene University.

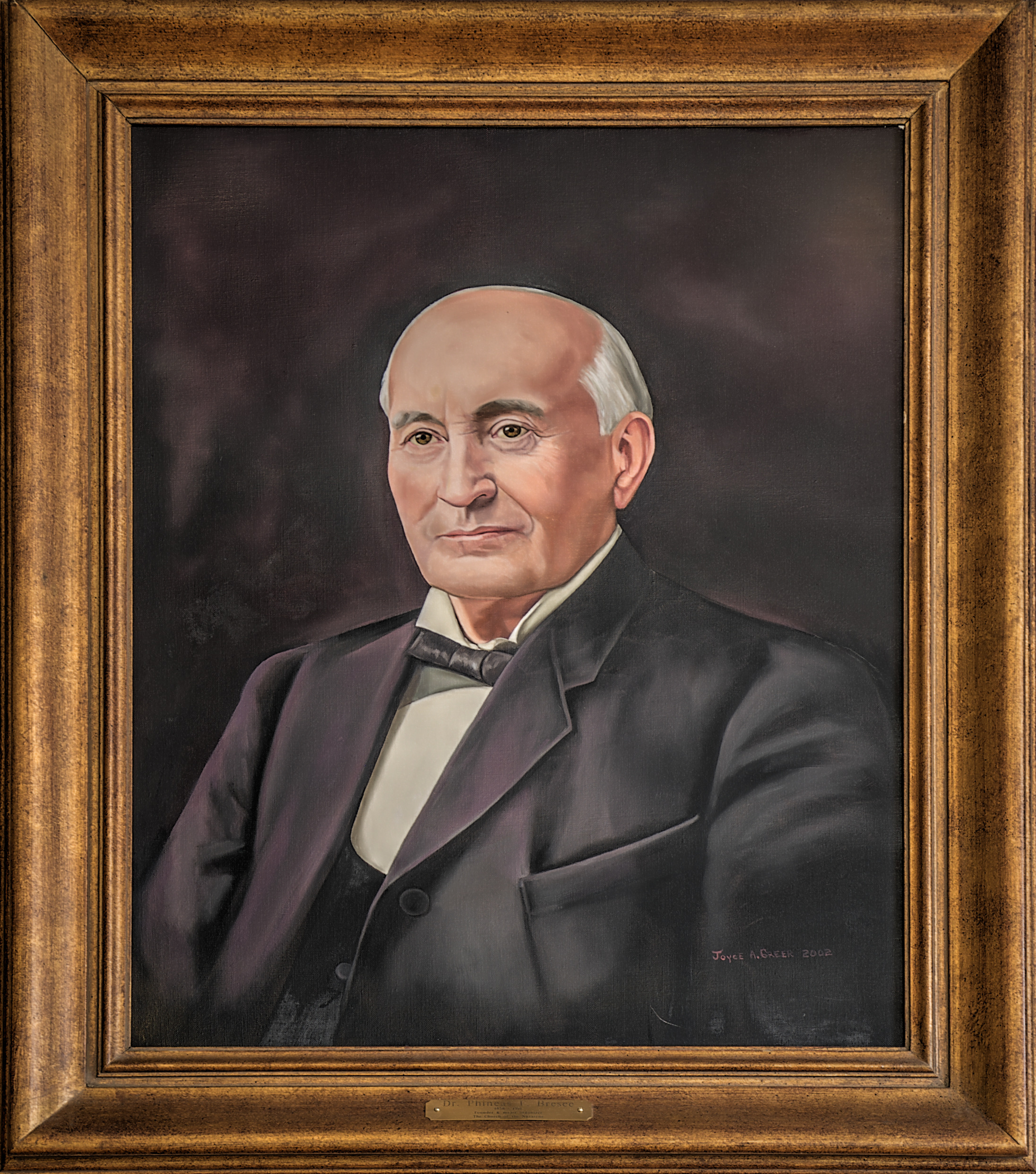
Painting of Bresee on display at the World Methodist Museum, Lake Junaluska, NC

== Early life and ministry ==
Bresee was born on a farm near Franklin, New York, and raised there and in nearby Davenport. He was converted to Christianity in the Methodist Episcopal Church in Davenport in 1856 and delivered his first sermon later that year. He helped his family move to Iowa in 1857 and entered the Methodist Episcopal ministry in Iowa soon afterward. In 1860 he married Maria Hebbard, his sweetheart from back in New York.

Bresee was a pastor in Iowa from 1857 until 1883, serving various charges including East Des Moines, Chariton, Wesley Chapel (Des Moines), Broadway Church in Council Bluffs, Red Oak, and Creston. He also served a term as a presiding elder (now district superintendent) and was a delegate to 1872 General Conference of the M. E. Church, held at Brooklyn, New York. In 1883 he relocated his large extended family (which included six children, his parents, and a nephew) to the West Coast. He was appointed to Fort Street Methodist Church (now First United Methodist Church) in Los Angeles, California, then to Pasadena First, and later to Simpson Tabernacle (L.A.), Asbury M. E. Church (L.A.) and Boyle Heights (also in L. A.). In California, he also served as a presiding elder of the Los Angeles District and as a delegate to the 1892 General Conference of his church. He had also chaired the committee that recommended Simpson College become a four–year college, raised the money for buildings there like College Hall, now "the college’s primary historic landmark", and served on their board of trustees for 16 years, part of that time as board president. In Los Angeles, he was a trustee for the University of Southern California and worked with J. P. Widney to save the College of Liberal Arts there.

== Church of the Nazarene ==
In 1894 Bresee withdrew from the appointive ministry of the Methodist Episcopal Church in order to serve as pastor to the Peniel Mission, an independent ministry to the homeless of Los Angeles. Over the next year, a rift opened between Bresee and the Peniel Mission's founders, Rev Theodore Pollock Ferguson and his wife, Manie Payne Ferguson. Bresee became convinced that the best ministry for the urban poor was to create strong churches that ministered to entire families. The Fergusons, the mission founders, believed that the Peniel Mission should focus, instead, on the "down and outer". In October 1895, Bresee and Dr. Joseph Pomeroy Widney, a leading Los Angeles physician and former president of the University of Southern California, joined with numerous lay men and women to form a new church. Widney suggested the name "Church of the Nazarene", because he said it identified the ministry with the toiling masses of common people for whom Jesus lived and died.

The new church in Los Angeles prospered. In 1898 there were two new congregations in the greater San Francisco area. Widney also departed that year and returned briefly to the Methodist church before forming his own independent congregation. From 1903 on, Bresee began a process of systematic church planting, and by 1907 there were congregations of the Church of the Nazarene up and down the West Coast and as far east as Illinois.

In 1907, Bresee led the Church of the Nazarene into a union with another Wesleyan-holiness denomination, the Association of Pentecostal Churches of America, a similar group that originated in New England and extended from Nova Scotia, down New England and the Middle Atlantic states, and westward to Iowa. Meeting in Chicago for their First General Assembly, the two groups formalized their merger, adopting the name Pentecostal Church of the Nazarene and electing two general superintendents (bishops)—one from the western group and one from the eastern body. Bresee was the first general superintendent elected, and he was soon joined by H. F. Reynolds of Brooklyn as the second one. The following year, at Pilot Point, Texas, the Second General Assembly of the Pentecostal Church of the Nazarene was held and a southern body, the Holiness Church of Christ, merged with the Pentecostal Nazarenes. E. P. Ellyson of Texas was elected to join Bresee and Reynolds on the Board of General Superintendents. Bresee served as the senior general superintendent of the church until his death in 1915.

During these years, Bresee continued serving as pastor of Los Angeles First Church of the Nazarene until 1911, when he retired from that position. And he edited the Nazarene Messenger, a large weekly paper, from 1898 until 1912. Through the paper, he rallied his people and knit strong familial bonds among the Nazarenes. When a group of women wanted to create a Bible school in Los Angeles, Bresee consented (somewhat grudgingly) to assist them, and became the president of the college, serving in that capacity until 1911. That school became known as Pasadena College until 1973, when it moved to San Diego. It has been known since as Point Loma Nazarene College and Point Loma Nazarene University.

== Death ==
His health deteriorated in his later years from injuries suffered in a near-fatal electric car accident in 1900. Phineas F. Bresee died in 1915.
