= Manie Payne Ferguson =

Manie Payne Ferguson (1850 – 8 June 1932) was a pioneer leader in the American Holiness Movement, a Christian evangelist and social worker who co-founded the Peniel Mission, and the author of several hymns, most notably "Blessed Quietness".

== Early life ==
Ferguson was born Manie Payne in 1850 in the town of Carlow in County Carlow, 84 km from Dublin, in the south-east of Ireland. On 7 June 1883, she married Theodore Pollock Ferguson (January 10, 1853, in Mansfield, Richland County, Ohio – July 12, 1920, in Los Angeles), a former minister in the United Presbyterian Church (Jones, Guide 628; Hunt 285), who had been converted in 1875 in Oberlin, Ohio, through the preaching of evangelist Charles Finney (Clark 1949:79). After relocating to Santa Barbara, California, in 1879, he was entirely sanctified in a holiness revival meeting in 1880 in California. (Frankiel 106). Initially TP became an itinerant preacher, before moving with Manie to Los Angeles during the boom of 1885–1886. (Frankiel in Holland, 22)

== Peniel Mission ==
Ferguson, along with her husband, Theodore, founded the Los Angeles Mission on November 11, 1886. This was eventually renamed the Peniel Mission. According to Piepkorn, "The name Peniel was chosen from Genesis 32: 24-30, and is meant to connote spiritual triumph." (Piepkorn 27) According to Frankiel, Peniel means "Face of God". (107) From the outset, the Peniel Mission was undenominational and nonsectarian. In 1894, the Fergusons received a significant anonymous financial donation (from former English cricketer George Studd). With this funding the Fergusons were able to plan to expand the ministry of the Peniel Mission. They invited former Methodist presiding elder Dr Phineas Bresee to join them in their endeavor, and constructed a 900-seat auditorium and ministry center at 227 South Main Street, Los Angeles. It was decided that there would be four superintendents: Theodore and Manie Ferguson, George Studd and Phineas F. Bresee.

On Sunday 21 October 1894 the 900-seat Peniel Hall was dedicated. University of Southern California president Dr. Joseph Pomeroy Widney led the 9:30 am Praise Service, while Bresee preached in the 11:00 am service "from the text, "And Jacob called the name of the place Peniel: for I have seen God face to face, and my life is preserved."(Smith, 40). In the initial issue of the Peniel Herald, it was announced

Our first work is to try to reach the unchurched. The people from the homes and the street where the light from the churches does not reach, or penetrates but little. Especially to gather the poor to the cross, by bringing to bear upon them Christian sympathy and helpfulness.... It is also our work to preach and teach the gospel of full salvation; to show forth the blessed privilege of believers in Jesus Christ, to be made holy and thus perfect in love. (Smith 40)

As Timothy Smith explains:

Here were holiness and humanitarianism working hand in hand, as in the days of Wesley. And sectarian feeling was rejected: "Peniel Mission is thoroughly evangelical but entirely undenominational," the Herald declared. Its superintendents would welcome help from all "earnest souls . . . who have any time over and above the work in their churches that they desire to give". (Smith 40)

After Bresee and Widney separated from the Peniel Mission in September 1895 to form the Church of the Nazarene, Manie Ferguson provided primary leadership of the Peniel Mission. According to Schwanz,

Manie Ferguson was more outgoing than Theodore and was the guiding force for the expansion of the ministry. ... Under Manie's direction, the Peniel Missions sought to provide a ministry for single women. This appears to have been a primary motivation in the growth of the movement. The women usually lived in rented rooms near the rented hall where they conducted evangelistic services. They boldly testified on street corners and in bars and houses of prostitution. All workers were unsalaried, but the local mission paid for most of their expenses. Even the Fergusons were not paid by the mission, but lived on the rental income from three small houses they owned.

According to Sandra Frankiel,

Together with his wife Manie, he offered street-corner meetings in the afternoons and evangelistic services nightly, with a meal afterwards. Their entire work, like that of most of the city holiness missions, was oriented toward soul saving and the promotion of holiness. The mission was not a church, however; converts were supposed to join one of the regular denominations. It was, rather, a holiness revival station spreading the message of Christian perfection. (Frankiel 106-107)

"The Peniel Mission used some of the same methods as the Salvation Army, including street-corner meetings followed by parades back to the mission hall."(Taiz 185)

After her husband's death in 1920, "Mother Ferguson" continued to direct the work until her own death on 8 June 1932. In 1947 the Peniel Mission became a part of the present-day World Gospel Mission. In 1998, the West Coast USA Peniel Missions experienced a significant change when the majority of Peniel Missionaries resigned from Peniel Mission and went to work for City Team Ministries leaving the Peniel Mission in Stockton, California, the remaining American Peniel Mission affiliated with the World Gospel Mission.

== Poet and hymn writer ==
Manie Ferguson wrote many poems and hymns. The song for which she is still remembered is "Blessed Quietness" ("Joys are flowing like a river / Since the Comforter has come") (1897). Other hymns she wrote include: "That Man of Calvary" and "Christ in the Storm" (1904).

== Writings ==
- Echoes From Beulah. Los Angeles: T. P. & M. P. Ferguson, 1913.
- Faith Tonic.
- Peniel Missionary Work.
- T.P. Ferguson: The Love Slave of Jesus Christ and His People and Founder of Peniel Missions (1900). 240 pages. Includes 39 poems by Ferguson, a photo of T.P. Ferguson (page 17), biography of the life of T.P. Ferguson, notes from T.P. Ferguson's diary for 1881-1882 (pages 95–103), Bible readings and notes by T.P. Ferguson (pages 107–219), Peniel Missionary Work (pages 220–238), and an update of "Peniel Missionary Work" (page 239).

== Sources and further reading ==
- Avella, Steven. Sacramento: Indomitable City. Sacramento, CA: Arcadia, 2003. See page 71 for reference to the Peniel Mission at Sacramento.
- Bangs, Carl. Phineas F. Bresee: His Life in Methodism, the Holiness Movement, and the Church of the Nazarene (1995). Includes a chapter that discusses Bresee's involvement in the Peniel Mission in Los Angeles and profiles other principal leaders involved in the mission's founding and development, including the Fergusons and G. B. Studd.
- Bartleman, Frank. "How Pentecost Came to Los Angeles. Los Angeles, 1925. Republished as "Azusa Street".
- Clark, Elmer Talmage. The Small Sects in America: Their Historical, Theological, and Psychological Background. Revised Edition. Nashville: Abingdon-Cokesbury Press, 1949. See page 79 for discussion of the Peniel Mission and TP and Manie P Ferguson.
- Cox, Mabel Holmes. The Lady Pioneer: Pioneer Missionary Work in Alaska and the Northwest. Roseburg, Ore.: n.p., 1968. Autobiography of Peniel Mission missionary who served at several different sites. Includes photographs, including ones of Mr. and Mrs. T. P. Ferguson, founders of the Peniel Mission.
- Darling, Olive M., compiler. Converts of Peniel Missions, n.p., n.d.
- Frankiel, Sandra Sizer. California's Spiritual Frontiers: Religious Alternatives in Anglo-Protestantism, 1850-1910. Berkeley: University of California Press, c1988 1988. See pages 106-107 for Peniel Mission and the ministry of the Fergusons.
- Hammack, Mary L., ed. A Dictionary of Women in Church History. Moody Press, 1984.
- Hittson, Paul A. History of Peniel Missions. 1975.
- Holland, Clifton L., comp. An Overview of Religion in Los Angeles from 1850 to 1930.
- Hunt, William Chamberlin, ed. United States. Bureau of the Census. Religious Bodies: 1906. Washington, D.C.: Government Printing Office, 1910. See page 285 for good description of the Peniel Mission.
- Hustad, Donald Paul. Dictionary-Handbook to Hymns for the Living Church. Carol Stream, Illinois: Hope Publishing Company, 1978. See pages 239-240 regarding Ferguson.
- Jones, Charles Edwin. Perfectionist Persuasion: The Holiness Movement and American Methodism, 1867-1936. Metuchen, NJ: Scarecrow Press, 1974. Section on the Peniel Mission pages 69–77.
- LeTourneau, R.G. Mover of Men and Mountains. Chicago: Moody, 1967. See pages 87–88, 91, 194-195 for LeTourneau's involvement in and support of the Peniel Mission at Stockton, California.
- Lewis, James R., editor. The Encyclopedia of Cults, Sects, and New Religions. 2nd ed. Prometheus Books, 2001. See page 561 for encyclopedic article about the Peniel Missions and the Fergusons.
- Melton, J. Gordon, editor. The Encyclopedia of American Religions: Vol. 1. Tarrytown, NY: Triumph Books, 1991. Chapter: Holiness Family; section: 19th Century Holiness; pg. 214 for article regarding the Peniel Missions and the Fergusons.
- Osbeck, Kenneth W. 101 More Hymn Stories: The Inspiring True Stories Behind 101 Favorite Hymns. Kregel, 1985. See pages 314-315 for biography of Haldor Lillenas and his conversion through the Peniel Mission in Portland, Oregon.
- Osbeck, Kenneth W. Amazing Grace: 366 Inspiring Hymn Stories for Daily Devotions (2nd Edition). Kregel, 2002. See entry for May 22 for reflections on "Blessed Quietness".
- Peniel Herald. Official organ of the Peniel Mission.
- Piepkorn, Arthur Carl. Profiles in Belief: The Religious Bodies of the United States and Canada. HarperCollins, 1978. See page 7 for Bresee's involvement in the Peniel Mission.
- Pounds, Michael E. "The Beginning Days." Peniel Herald, Number 5, 1986. Concerns the Peniel Missions and the work of T. P. and Manie Ferguson. Reference to Haldor Lillenas.
- Schwanz, Keith. Satisfied: Women Hymn Writers of the 19th-century Wesleyan/Holiness movement. Wesleyan/Holiness Women Clergy, Inc, 1998. Gives a brief biography of Manie Ferguson.
- Smith, Timothy. Called Unto Holiness: The Story of the Nazarenes. Kansas City, Missouri: Nazarene, 1962. See pages 49 and following for involvement of Bresee and Widney in the Peniel Mission.
- Taiz, Lillian. Hallelujah Lads and Lasses: Remaking the Salvation Army in America, 1880-1930. University of North Carolina Press, 2000.
- "The Year in Review at the Los Angeles Mission, 1990." The Los Angeles Mission is the reorganized Peniel Mission.
- Wacker, Grant. Heaven Below: Early Pentecostals and American Culture. Harvard University Press, 2003. See page 204 for GB Studd's contribution to the Peniel Hall.
- Wood, John Windell. Pasadena, California, historical and personal;: A complete history of the organization of the Indiana colony, its establishment on the Rancho San Pascual ... Churches, societies, homes, etc. John W Wood, 1917. See page 326 for description of the Peniel Mission.
