= Hanson, Kentucky =

- City
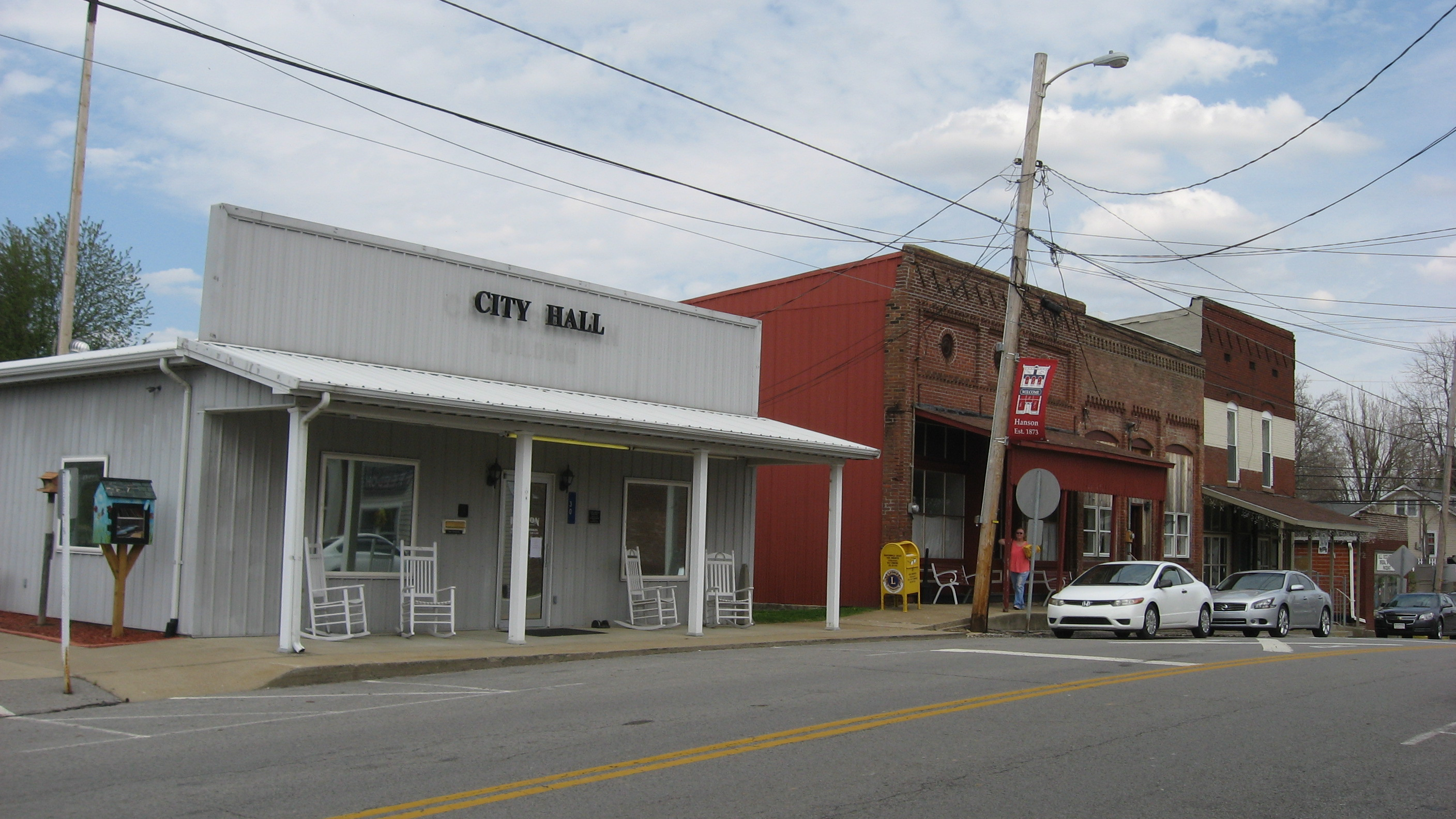
- Main Street downtown

- Location of Hanson in Hopkins County, Kentucky.
- Coordinates: 37°25′4″N 87°28′50″W
- Country: United States
- State: Kentucky
- County: Hopkins
- Founded: 1869
- Incorporated: 1873
- Named after: a local railroad employee

Government
  - Mayor: Jimmy Epley

Area
  - Total: 2.37 sq mi (6.13 km^{2})
  - Land: 2.36 sq mi (6.10 km^{2})
  - Water: 0.012 sq mi (0.03 km^{2})
- Elevation: 436 ft (133 m)

Population (2020)
  - Total: 758
  - Density: 321.9/sq mi (124.27/km^{2})
- Time zone: UTC-6 (CST)
  - Summer (DST): UTC-5 (CDT)
- ZIP Code: 42413
- Area codes: 270 & 364
- FIPS code: 21-34390
- GNIS feature ID: 0493695
- Website: www.cityofhanson.com

Hanson is a home rule-class city in Hopkins County, Kentucky, in the United States. As of the 2020 census, Hanson had a population of 758.

The Hanson Historic District is located in the city. The companies that supply power to Hanson residents are Kentucky Utilities and Kenergy.

== History ==
The town was founded in 1869 on a 50-acre (20 ha) grant from two local landowners, judge Robert Eastwood and pastor Roland Gooch, in order to function as a stop on the Evansville, Henderson, and Nashville Railroad. The city was laid out by (and named for) a railway's engineer and surveyor named Henry B. Hanson. The community received its post office on December 7, 1869, and was incorporated by the state assembly on March 31, 1873.

The Evansville, Henderson, & Nashville was purchased by the St. Louis and Southeastern in 1872, which (following a reorganization) was purchased in turn by the L&N in 1879.

The city was essentially destroyed by a fire in 1889, and the present historic district dates from the rebuilding that followed. Today, the former L&N network makes up part of CSX Transportation, which operates a siding track in Hanson.

== Geography ==
Hanson is located in northern Hopkins County at 37°25′4″N 87°28′50″W (37.417794, -87.480647). U.S. Route 41 (Hanson Road) passes through the center of town, and Interstate 69 passes through the eastern part, with access from Exit 120. Madisonville, the county seat, is 6 miles (10 km) to the south, and Henderson is 32 miles (51 km) to the north, via either highway.

According to the United States Census Bureau, Hanson has a total area of 2.6 square miles (6.8 km^{2}), of which 0.01 square miles (0.03 km^{2}), or 0.50%, are water.

== Demographics ==
Historical population
Census	Pop.	Note	%±
1880	217		—
1890	376		73.3%
1900	549		46.0%
1910	509		−7.3%
1920	216		−57.6%
1930	411		90.3%
1940	364		−11.4%
1950	393		8.0%
1960	376		−4.3%
1970	378		0.5%
1980	485		28.3%
1990	450		−7.2%
2000	625		38.9%
2010	742		18.7%
2020	758		2.2%
U.S. Decennial Census

As of the census of 2000, there were 625 people, 241 households, and 187 families residing in the city. The population density was 265.1 inhabitants per square mile (102.4/km^{2}). There were 265 housing units at an average density of 112.4 per square mile (43.4/km^{2}). The racial makeup of the city was 97.76% White, 0.48% Black or African American, 0.96% Asian, and 0.80% from two or more races. Hispanic or Latino of any race were 0.64% of the population.

There were 241 households, out of which 38.6% had children under the age of 18 living with them, 66.8% were married couples living together, 7.9% had a female householder with no husband present, and 22.0% were non-families. 19.5% of all households were made up of individuals, and 10.4% had someone living alone who was 65 years of age or older. The average household size was 2.59 and the average family size was 2.90.

In the city, the population was spread out, with 26.2% under the age of 18, 6.4% from 18 to 24, 29.3% from 25 to 44, 26.6% from 45 to 64, and 11.5% who were 65 years of age or older. The median age was 39 years. For every 100 females, there were 92.9 males. For every 100 females age 18 and over, there were 89.7 males.

The median income for a household in the city was $31,250, and the median income for a family was $36,406. Males had a median income of $32,054 versus $21,731 for females. The per capita income for the city was $14,932. About 6.7% of families and 12.5% of the population were below the poverty line, including 11.3% of those under age 18 and 16.1% of those age 65 or over.
