= Peniel Mission =

Christian organization

The Peniel Mission was an interdenominational holiness rescue mission that was started in Los Angeles, California, on 11 November 1886 by Theodore Pollock Ferguson (1853–1920) and Manie Payne Ferguson (born 1850; died 8 June 1932). It was dissolved in 1949.

== History of the Peniel Mission ==
=== Origins and early days (1886–1894) ===
Manie Payne Ferguson, along with her husband, Theodore, founded the Los Angeles Mission on November 11, 1886, at the Masonic Hall on Spring Street (near 416 North Main Street) in downtown Los Angeles. However, after three months they were forced to move to the basement of the Nadeau Hotel (opened 5 July 1886), located on the southwest corner of Spring and First Streets. After a year, they were forced to rent the burnt-out Methodist Episcopal Church, South for six months until it could be demolished. The Mission then relocated to rented rooms at 107 North Main Street. In the first eight years, the Mission relocated six times, before establishing a permanent location.

The Mission was eventually renamed the Peniel Mission. Peniel means "Face of God", and "was chosen from Genesis 32: 24–30, and is meant to connote spiritual triumph."

=== Peniel Hall (1894) ===
From the outset, the Peniel Mission was non-denominational and nonsectarian. In 1894, the Fergusons received a significant anonymous financial donation (from former English cricketer George Studd). With this funding the Fergusons were able to plan to expand the ministry of the Peniel Mission. They invited former Methodist presiding elder Dr. Phineas Bresee to join them in their endeavour, and planned to construct a 900-seat auditorium and ministry centre at 227 South Main Street, Los Angeles. It was decided that there would be four superintendents: Theodore and Manie Ferguson, George Studd and Phineas Bresee.

On Sunday 21 October 1894 the 900-seat Peniel Hall was dedicated. University of Southern California president Dr. Joseph Pomeroy Widney led the 9:30 am Praise Service, while Bresee preached in the 11:00 am service "from the text, "And Jacob called the name of the place Peniel: for I have seen God face to face, and my life is preserved."(Smith, 40). In the initial issue of the Peniel Herald, the mission's official newspaper, it was announced

"Our first work is to try to reach the unchurched. The people from the homes and the street where the light from the churches does not reach, or penetrates but little. Especially to gather the poor to the cross, by bringing to bear upon them Christian sympathy and helpfulness.... It is also our work to preach and teach the gospel of full salvation; to show forth the blessed privilege of believers in Jesus Christ, to be made holy and thus perfect in love."

As Timothy Smith explains:

Here were holiness and humanitarianism working hand in hand, as in the days of Wesley. And sectarian feeling was rejected: "Peniel Mission is thoroughly evangelical but entirely undenominational," the Herald declared. Its superintendents would welcome help from all "earnest souls . . . who have any time over and above the work in their churches that they desire to give."

In October 1894 at the dedication of the Peniel Hall, Widney announced his intention to organize a Training Institute, in which Bible and practical nursing were to be the principal studies. By December 1894 Bresee had urged in the Peniel Herald the creation of an organization to screen out undesirable workers, and to create a group for "those that are being gathered in, who have no church affiliation, who need care and fellowship, and a place to find a home and work." Bresee and the other three superintendents created a printed statement of belief to be required of all who wished to associate themselves with Peniel Hall. It was a broad one, "embracing in simplest statement… a few of those essential things which are the common inheritance of the children of God.":

"The Peniel Mission is an organization for Christian service and fellowship. It will be required that those who seek to become members of the Peniel Mission be sound in the faith on all the main points of Christian doctrine, which may be particularized as follows:
"1. The Divine inspiration of the Scriptures, the Old and New Testaments.
"2. The Trinity of the Godhead, Father, Son and Holy Ghost.
"3. The Fall of man, and his consequent need of Regeneration.
"4. The Atonement of the Lord Jesus Christ for all men.
"5. Justification by Faith in Him.
"6. Sanctification by Faith in the cleansing blood of Jesus Christ, and the Baptism of the Holy Ghost.
"7. The Resurrection of the dead.

"8. The eternity of Reward and Punishment."

According to Smith, "What Bresee intended, apparently, was a combination of the interdenominational mission idea with that of an independent church, the former for the workers and sponsors who had no thought of forsaking their old allegiances, the latter for the converts and others who had no church home."

=== Leadership difficulties (1895) ===
However, by early October 1895, Widney and Bresee were "frozen out" of the Peniel Mission. Frankiel indicates: "At first Bresee joined with the Fergusons at the Peniel Mission in Los Angeles, where he tried to persuade them to open a school and organize to receive members like a church. They refused, however, and other difficulties led to his parting with them after one year." According to Smith,

[t]he immediate cause for the organization of the Church of the Nazarene … is not so much to be found in Bresee's differences with the Methodists as in those which developed between him and the proprietors of Peniel Hall. Certainly J. P. Widney must have been disillusioned when A. B. Simpson, leader of the Christian and Missionary Alliance and reportedly an extremist on divine healing, appeared as a special worker at the mission in May [1895]. Bresee on his part disagreed with Mr. and Mrs. Fergusons' insistence upon the use of young women in rescue work, and their growing interest in foreign missionary schemes.

Another cause of disagreement was that Bresee became convinced that the best ministry for the urban poor was to create strong churches that ministered to entire families, whereas the Fergusons believed that the Peniel Mission should focus instead on the "down and outer" and remain non-denominational.

=== Subsequent developments and expansion (1895–1906) ===
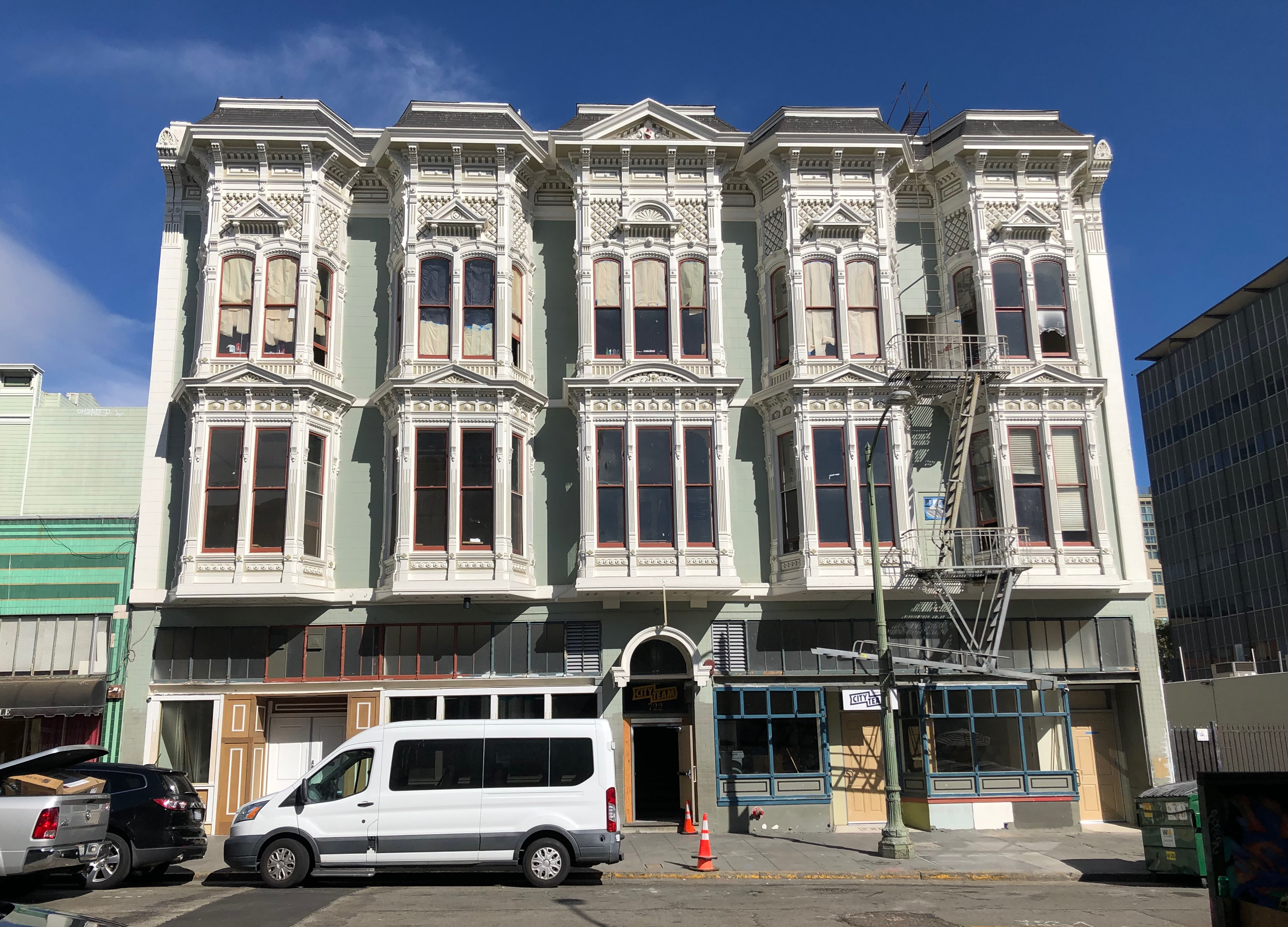
Former Peniel Mission at 716–724 Washington Street in Oakland, California; now part of CityTeam

From the home base in Los Angeles, other missions were established as Peniel Missions, primarily on the west coast of the United States of America, but also in Memphis, New York, Alaska and Hawaii. "With a United States membership destined never to exceed a thousand (in 1906 a government report said 703), the ministry…had an impact on the larger [holiness] movement far in excess of that implied by numbers." By the turn of the twentieth century, more than 25 missions and rescue homes had been started. Among the Peniel Missions established were those located at:

- 1. San Pedro, Los Angeles, the first branch mission, established 20 November 1891;
- 2. Grant Avenue, San Francisco (11 November 1893)
- 3. San Diego, California on 3 March 1895
- 4. Juneau, Alaska, on June 1, 1895
- 5. Douglas, Alaska, in October 1895
- 6. San Bernardino, California, in February 1896
- 7. Stockton, California, on May 6, 1896
- 8. Eureka, California, on August 11, 1896
- 9. 325 Kay Street, Sacramento, California, on August 15, 1896
- 10. a second mission in San Francisco, California at Third Avenue was also opened in August 1896
- 11. Memphis, Tennessee, in December 1896 (although it only lasted a few years)
- 12. 14th Street, New York City, started by Miss Ella Shaw (later Melody) in spring of 1897, but relocated to 39 Bowery in December 1897 and subsequently known as the Peniel Josephine Mission;
- 13. a third mission in San Francisco was originally started on May 14, 1897, on Sacramento Street, but later relocated to Pacific Street (within two blocks of 49 saloons), and later still to the corner of Kearney and Montgomery Streets
- 14. 407 Broadway, Oakland, California, opened on June 29, 1897, but later moved to the Oriental Block at 716–724 Washington Street
- 15. Pasadena, California, on October 30, 1897
- 16. the Victor, Colorado, mission in the mining camps was opened on 20 November 1897
- 17. Fresno, California, opened on December 18, 1897
- 18. Vallejo, California (near the naval station) was opened on 16 March 1898 by three women from San Francisco
- 19. Long Beach, California, mission was opened on 6 May 1898
- 20. a rescue home was established in San Francisco in August 1898 to minister to women
- 21. Hawaii was opened on March 25, 1899, and by 1904 was meeting in a hall on the corner of Hotel and Fort Streets in Honolulu
- 22. a rescue home was opened in Sacramento on April 1, 1899. Wealthy socialite Margaret Eleanor Rhodes Crocker (1822–1901) donated her Sacramento mansion to the Peniel Rescue Mission in 1900 for the care of "erring young women.";
- 23. Wrangell, Alaska, opened May 7, 1899
- 24. Skagway, Alaska, opened on May 16, 1899, by Victorine Tooley (or Yorba) and her daughter Roberta Yorba, who were members of the Peniel Mission in Sacramento. They decided to establish a mission in Skagway and when they moved up, brought both Justina M Dickinson and Victorine's step-sister, Gusta Carnahan with them. "The Peniel Missions were dedicated to helping the "soiled doves" or prostitutes. There is no record of any of them after 1900, so they may have found better areas to take the Mission (once the gold rush was over, the population of men and consequently prostitutes dropped).
- 25. 502 Pike Street, Seattle, Washington in 1902. On 21 July 1913 sailors of the US Reserve Fleet destroyed the chapel in the mistaken belief that it was the headquarters of the Industrial Workers. When they realised their mistake, the sailors took an offering to compensate the Peniel Mission, and then destroyed the headquarters of the Radical Socialists.
- 26. 247 NW Couch Street, Portland, Oregon (1904), later 5 more locations including Jefferson and 1st Streets

Other Peniel missions were established, including:

- 12th Street and Pacific Avenue, Tacoma, Washington
- Astoria, Oregon
- Bakersfield, California
- W 11th St and N Senate Ave Indianapolis, Indiana, eventually leased to the Christ Temple Pentecostal denomination from 1912 and sold in 1915; (DuPree, African-American Holiness Pentecostal Movement, 269–270.
- Santa Cruz, California.

=== Decline and demise (1906–1949) ===
==== Azusa Street and the rise of Pentecostalism ====
The Azusa Street Revival of April 1906 had a negative effect on the Peniel Mission. Among those defecting from Peniel Hall was an Owen "Irish" Lee, a former Irish-American Catholic converted through Peniel Hall, who hosted William Seymour in 1906 and allowed meetings in his home. The Lees informed other members of Peniel about the meetings (later held at 214 North Bonnie Brae Street). On 9 April 1906 Lee received the Baptism of the Holy Spirit and spoke in tongues in his home when Seymour laid hands on him and prayed. This precipitated other manifestations of tongues-speaking (including Seymour for the first time) later that day. Among those affected were Jennie Moore and Ruth Asberry who went to the Peniel Mission and spoke in tongues there. This resulted in the entire congregation of the Peniel Mission following them to the Azusa Street Mission. "Most of the churches, mission and tent meetings in the area were effected immediately. Some lost so many people to the Azusa Street Mission that they closed."

Among those who also defected to the Pentecostal movement was their primary financial supporter, George Studd, former English cricketer and one of the primary benefactors of the Peniel Mission since its inception in 1886, who defected to the Apostolic Faith Mission in September 1907; and Frank Bartleman (1871–1936), pioneer Pentecostal preacher and the chronicler of the Azusa Street Revival, who was appointed director of the Peniel Mission in Stockton, California, in early 1904, and later preached regularly at the Peniel Mission in Pasadena, California, immediately prior to his involvement in the nascent Pentecostal movement.

==== Highlights ====
About 15 October 1906 there was a fire at the Peniel Hall in Los Angeles which caused the death of one elderly female worker, injury to two male workers, and the total destruction of the building.

==== Deaths of Theodore and Manie Ferguson ====
After her husband's death in 1920, "Mother Ferguson" continued to direct the work until her own death. Upon the death of Manie Ferguson on 8 June 1932, control of the Peniel Mission passed to an all-female self-perpetuating board.

==== Changes ====
In 1947 the Peniel Mission became a part of the present-day World Gospel Mission. In 1998, all but two of the former West Coast USA Peniel Missions missionaries resigned from Peniel Missions, Inc. / World Gospel Missions and went to work for CityTeam Ministries. Peniel Missions in Seattle, Portland, San Francisco and Oakland were closed and the buildings and small fixed assets were sold to the ministry of CityTeam in a transaction that allowed those being ministered to continue receiving the services they needed. Missionaries Ashley and Justin Guest continue the work at Peniel Missions, Inc. at 1500 and 1508 S. Sutter Street, Stockton, California today. This is the only remaining American Peniel Mission affiliated with World Gospel Mission.

== Methods ==
"The Peniel Mission used some of the same methods as The Salvation Army, including street-corner meetings followed by parades back to the mission hall". According to Schwanz,

"Manie Ferguson was more outgoing than Theodore and was the guiding force for the expansion of the ministry. … Under Manie’s direction, the Peniel Missions sought to provide a ministry for single women. This appears to have been a primary motivation in the growth of the movement. The women usually lived in rented rooms near the rented hall where they conducted evangelistic services. They boldly testified on street corners and in bars and houses of prostitution. All workers were unsalaried, but the local mission paid for most of their expenses. Even the Fergusons were not paid by the mission, but lived on the rental income from three small houses they owned."

According to Sandra Frankiel,

"Together with his wife Manie, he offered street-corner meetings in the afternoons and evangelistic services nightly, with a meal afterwards. Their entire work, like that of most of the city holiness missions, was oriented toward soul saving and the promotion of holiness. The mission was not a church, however; converts were supposed to join one of the regular denominations. It was, rather, a holiness revival station spreading the message of Christian perfection".

== The Peniel Missionary Society (1895–1949) ==
In addition to the expansion of the Peniel Mission in the United States of America, and its overseas territories: Alaska and Hawaii, eventually Peniel Missions were established overseas in Africa, Bolivia (1911); China (1909); Egypt, Guatemala, India, Mexico, and the Philippines. A separate organisation, The Peniel Missionary Society, under the control of Manie and Theodore Ferguson, was formed in 1895. The objective of the organisation was: "Mission work, as God shall lead, and as means shall be provided." (Dennis). The Mission operated on the faith mission model, with workers unsalaried, and guaranteed no financial support. Despite this, by 1911, the Peniel Missionary Society was operating in the following fields: India, North Africa (Egypt), Mexico, Central America (Guatemala), South America (Argentine Republic, and Bolivia), West Indies (Puerto Rico), Alaska, and Hawaii. (Dennis)

== Prominent members and supporters ==
Prominent members of the Peniel Mission included

- Haldor Lillenas (1885–1959), "the most influential Wesleyan/ Holiness songwriter and publisher in the 20th century", who was converted at the Peniel Mission in Astoria, Oregon, in 1906; and
- R.G. LeTourneau, wealthy pioneer of the earth-moving industry who was active in the Peniel Mission at Stockton, California.

== Sources and further reading ==
- Anderson, Donald Firth. ""We Have Here a Different Civilization": Protestant Identity in the San Francisco Bay Area, 1906–1909." The Western Historical Quarterly 23:2 (May 1992), 199–221. See reference to Peniel Missions.
- Avella, Steven. Sacramento: Indomitable City. Sacramento, CA: Arcadia, 2003. See page 71 for reference to the Peniel Mission at Sacramento.
- Bangs, Carl. Phineas F. Bresee: His Life in Methodism, the Holiness Movement, and the Church of the Nazarene (1995). Includes a chapter that discusses Bresee's involvement in the Peniel Mission in Los Angeles and profiles other principal leaders involved in the mission's founding and development, including the Fergusons and G. B. Studd.
- Bartleman, Frank. How Pentecost Came to Los Angeles. Los Angeles, CA: 1925. Republished as Azusa Street.
- Beach, Harlan Page. India and Christian Opportunity. Student volunteer Movement for Foreign Missions, 1904. Page 297 gives statistics for the Peniel work in India.
- Besse, Henry True. Church History. Holzapfel Publishing Co., 1980. See page 232 for article on the Peniel Missions.
- California Historical Society. "Peniel Mission". California History 74:388.
- Cary, William Walter. Story of the National Holiness Missionary Society. Chicago, IL: National Holiness Missionary Society, 1940.
- Carroll, Henry King. The Religious Forces of the United States Enumerated, Classified, and Described. C. Scribner's Sons, 1912. Page 470 Enumerates the statistics for the Peniel Mission at 703 members in 1910.
- Case, Jay R. "And Ever the Twain Shall Meet: The Holiness Missionary Movement and the Birth of World Pentecostalism, 1870–1920." Religion and American Culture 16: 2 (Summer 2006):125–160. Archived 2011-09-27 at the Wayback Machine "Case moves the study of Holiness/Pentecostal origins to a new level of sophistication by framing the story within a global process, paying special heed to notions of modernization and resistance to modernization. The article makes clear that Pentecostalism did not start in the United States but came here as part of an international movement." Archived 2008-07-03 at the Wayback Machine
- Clark, Elmer Talmage. The Small Sects in America: Their Historical, Theological, and Psychological Background. Revised Edition. Nashville: Abingdon-Cokesbury Press, 1949. See pages 79–80 for discussion of the Peniel Mission and TP and Manie P Ferguson.
- Cox, Mabel Holmes. The Lady Pioneer: Pioneer Missionary Work in Alaska and the Northwest. Roseburg, OR: n.p., 1968. Autobiography of Peniel Mission missionary who served at several different sites. Includes photographs, including ones of Mr. and Mrs. T. P. Ferguson, founders of the Peniel Mission.
- Darling, Olive M., compiler. Converts of Peniel Missions. n.p., n.d.
- Dennis, James S. and Charles H. Fahs, eds. World Atlas of Christian Missions: Containing a Directory of Missionary Societies, a Classified Summary of Statistics, an Index of Mission Stations, and Maps Showing the Location of Mission Stations Throughout the World. Rev. ed. New York: Student Volunteer Movement for Foreign Missions, 1911. Online edition: Gives details of Peniel Missionary Society.
- Ferguson, Manie Payne. Echoes From Beulah. Los Angeles: T. P. & M. P. Ferguson, 1913. Musical Score. 268 pp.
- Ferguson, Manie Payne. "Peniel Missionary Work" in Faith Tonic: 1 and 2 Combined; being a series of articles by different writers, exemplifying God's dealings with those who trust Him, 3–35. Compiled by Leander Lycurgus Pickett. Louisville, KY: Pentecostal Publishing Company, c.1920s. 102 pp.
- Ferguson, Manie Payne. T.P. Ferguson: The Love Slave of Jesus Christ and His People and Founder of Peniel Missions (c.1920). 240 pages. Includes 39 poems by Ferguson, a photo of T.P. Ferguson (page 17), biography of the life of T.P. Ferguson, notes from T.P. Ferguson's diary for 1881–1882 (pages 95–103), Bible readings and notes by T.P. Ferguson (pages 107–219), Peniel Missionary Work (pages 220–238), and an update of "Peniel Missionary Work" (page 239).
- Frankiel, Sandra Sizer. California's Spiritual Frontiers: Religious Alternatives in Anglo-Protestantism, 1850–1910. Berkeley: University of California Press, 1988. See pages 106–107 for Peniel Mission and the ministry of the Fergusons.
- Henry, Helga Bender. Mission on Main Street. W. A. Wilde Company, 1955. See page 105 for reference to Mrs Ferguson and the Peniel Mission.
- Hinshilwood, C. Milton and Elena Irish Zimmerman. Old Los Angeles and Pasadena in Vintage Postcards (Postcard History Series). Arcadia Publishing: 2001. Features photographs of the Nadeau Hotel (page 14).
- Hittson, Paul A. History of Peniel Missions. Homeland, CA: Paul A. Hittson, 1975.
- Holland, Clifton L., comp. An Overview of Religion in Los Angeles from 1850 to 1930. Archived 2022-01-24 at the Wayback Machine
- Hunt, William Chamberlin, ed. United States. Bureau of the Census. Religious Bodies: 1906. Washington, D.C.: Government Printing Office, 1910. See page 285 for good description of the Peniel Mission.
- Hustad, Donald Paul. Dictionary-Handbook to Hymns for the Living Church. Carol Stream, Illinois: Hope Publishing Company, 1978. See pages 239–240 regarding Manie Ferguson.
- Jones, Charles Edwin. A Guide to the Study of the Holiness Movement . Metuchen, NJ: Scarecrow Press, 1974.
- Jones, Charles Edwin. Perfectionist Persuasion: The Holiness Movement and American Methodism, 1867–1936. Metuchen, NJ: Scarecrow Press, 1974. Section on the Peniel Mission: 243–244.
- Jones, Charles Edwin. The Wesleyan Holiness Movement: A Comprehensive Guide. Volume One: Parts I-III. Lanham, MD: Scarecrow Press, 2005. See pages 734–735 for article on the Peniel Missions.
- LeTourneau, R.G. Mover of Men and Mountains. Chicago: Moody, 1967. See pages 87–88, 91, 194–195 for LeTourneau's involvement in and support of the Peniel Mission at Stockton, California.
- Lewis, James R., editor. The Encyclopedia of Cults, Sects, and New Religions. 2nd ed. Prometheus Books, 2001. See page 561 for encyclopedic article about the Peniel Missions and the Fergusons.
- Lillenas, Haldor. Down Melody Lane: An Autobiography. Kansas City: Beacon Hill Press, 1953. See page 77 regarding MP Ferguson. Lillenas was converted through the Peniel Mission in Astoria, Washington in 1906.
- Lillenas, Haldor. Modern Gospel Song Stories. Kansas City, MO: Lillenas Publishing, 1952. See page 67 regarding Manie Ferguson.
- Melton, J. Gordon, editor. The Encyclopedia of American Religions: Vol. 1. Tarrytown, NY: Triumph Books, 1991. Chapter: Holiness Family; section: 19th Century Holiness; pg. 214 for article regarding the Peniel Missions and the Fergusons.
- Nickel, Thomas R. Azusa Street Outpouring: As Told to Me by Those who were There. Hartford, CT: Great Commission, 1979. Page 8 refers to the effect of the 1906 Azusa Pentecostal Revival on attendances at local churches and missions, including large numbers leaving the Peniel Mission in Los Angeles.
- Osbeck, Kenneth W. 101 More Hymn Stories: The Inspiring True Stories Behind 101 Favorite Hymns. Kregel, 1985. See pages 314–315 for biography of Haldor Lillenas and his conversion through the Peniel Mission in Portland, Oregon.
- Osbeck, Kenneth W. Amazing Grace: 366 Inspiring Hymn Stories for Daily Devotions (2nd Edition). Kregel, 2002. See entry for May 22 for reflections on "Blessed Quietness".
- Owens, Robert R. Speak to the Rock: The Azusa Street Revival: Its Roots and Its Message. University Press of America, 1998; Xulon, 2005. See pages 58–66 for effect of Azusa Street on the Peniel Mission in Los Angeles. Among those defecting was a former Irish-American Catholic converted through Peniel Hall, Owen "Irish" Lee who hosted William Seymour and allowed meetings in his home. The Lees advised other members of Peniel about the meetings (now being held at 214 North Bonnie Brae Street). On 9 April 1906 Lee received the Baptism of the Holy Spirit in his home when Seymour laid hands on him and prayed. This precipitated other manifestations of tongues-speaking (including Seymour for the first time). Among those affected were Jennie Moore and Ruth Asberry who went to the Peniel Mission and spoke in tongues there. This resulted in the entire congregation of the Peniel Mission following them to the Azusa Street Mission (66). "Most of the churches, mission and tent meetings in the area were effected immediately. Some lost so many people to the Azusa Street Mission that they closed." (Owens, 66).
- Phillips, Jim and Rosemary Gartner. Murdering Holiness: The Trials of Franz Creffield and George Mitchell. Seattle, WA: University of Washington Press, 2003. Franz Creffield briefly headed the Peniel Mission in The Dalles, Oregon before forming his own controversial group.
- Pickett, Leander Lycurgus, comp. Faith Tonic: 1 and 2 Combined; being a series of articles by different writers, exemplifying God's dealings with those who trust Him. Louisville, KY: Pentecostal Publishing Company, c.1920s. 102 pp. Includes article entitled: "Peniel Missionary Work" by Manie Payne Ferguson, pp. 3–35.
- Piepkorn, Arthur Carl. Profiles in Belief: The Religious Bodies of the United States and Canada. HarperCollins, 1978. See page 7 for Bresee's involvement in the Peniel Mission.
- Pounds, Michael E. "The Beginning Days". Peniel Herald, Number 5, 1986. Concerns the Peniel Missions and the work of T. P. and Manie Ferguson. Reference to Haldor Lillenas.
- Schwanz, Keith. Satisfied: Women Hymn Writers of the 19th-century Wesleyan/Holiness movement. Wesleyan/Holiness Women Clergy, Inc, 1998. Gives a brief biography of Manie Ferguson.
- Smith, Timothy. Called Unto Holiness: The Story of the Nazarenes. Kansas City, Missouri: Nazarene, 1962. See pages 49 and following for involvement of Bresee and Widney in the Peniel Mission.
- Taiz, Lillian. Hallelujah Lads and Lasses: Remaking the Salvation Army in America, 1880–1930. University of North Carolina Press, 2000.
- "The History of Urban Ministry." http://www.urbanministry.org/book/export/html/18982 (accessed 2 July 2008) Website of resources, including reference to Peniel Missions and CityTeam Ministries.
- The Year in Review at the Los Angeles Mission, 1990. The Los Angeles Mission is the reorganized Peniel Mission.
- Trachsel, Laura. "Kindled Fires in Peniel Missions". In Kindled fires in the U.S.A., 33–47. Marion, IN: World Gospel Mission, 1988.
- Wacker, Grant. Heaven Below: Early Pentecostals and American Culture. Harvard University Press, 2003. See page 204 for GB Studd's contribution to the Peniel Hall.
- Wood, John Windell. Pasadena, California, historical and personal;: A complete history of the organization of the Indiana colony, its establishment on the Rancho San Pascual … Churches, societies, homes, etc.. John W Wood, 1917. See page 326 for description of the Peniel Mission.

== Periodicals ==
- Chandler, Russell. "L.A.'s Quake-Stricken Peniel Mission Plagued by Constant Financial Difficulties" Los Angeles Times (27 November 1976):A31.
- The Los Angeles Peniel Transformer 7:10 (October 1978).
- The Oakland Peniel Transformer [Oakland Peniel Mission] 12:9 (October 1978)
- Peniel Herald. Official organ of the Peniel Mission. 59:1&2 (January & February 1957)
- "Story of Peniel Mission: Local Institution Observes Date of Founding in 1886 and Occupancy of Present Home: Peniel Mission Story is Told", The Los Angeles Times (18 November 1923):II1-2.

== Archival material ==
- "Papers of Charles Henry Troutman, Jr. Collection III". Billy Graham Center Archives, Wheaton, Illinois. The IVCF-USA folders are letters and reports from other Christian organizations about evangelism and mission activities around the world. For example, Folder 5–34 has letters and critiques of the Peniel movement.
- "Records of the Peniel Missions, 1917". Yale University Library, New Haven, CT.
