= Kentucky Route 284 =

State highway in Kentucky, United States

Kentucky Route 284
- KY 284 highlighted in red

Route information
- Maintained by KYTC
- Length: 6.8 mi (10.9 km)

Major junctions
- West end: US 60 / US 62 in Paducah
- KY 450 in Woodlawn-Oakdale; KY 131 in Reidland
- East end: US 68 southeast of Reidland

Location
- Country: United States
- State: Kentucky
- Counties: McCracken

Highway system
- Kentucky State Highway System; Interstate; US; State; Parkways
← KY 283	→ KY 285

Kentucky Route 284 (KY 284) is a 6.8-mile-long (10.9 km) state highway in the U.S. state of Kentucky. The highway connects Paducah, Woodlawn-Oakdale, and Reidland, within McCracken County.

== Route description ==
KY 284 begins at an intersection with US 60/US 62 (Irvin Cobb Drive) in the far southeastern part of Paducah, within McCracken County, where the roadway continues as Bridge Street. There are railroad tracks crossing through the intersection. It travels to the southeast and intersects the northern terminus of KY 2187 (Husband Road) on the southwestern edge of Kennedy Park. It crosses over some railroad tracks, entering Woodlawn-Oakdale. It intersects the northern terminus of KY 450 (Silk Tree Boulevard) and travels under a bridge that carries KY 1954 (John L. Puryear Drive) and then crosses over Clarks River, leaving Woodlawn-Oakdale. The highway travels just south of Priester Lake, curves to the south-southeast, and enters Reidland. It passes Reidland Middle School. It curves to the east-northeast and intersects KY 131 (Benton Road) and the western terminus of KY 1887 (Park Road). KY 131/KY 248 travels concurrently to the south-southwest and intersects the northern terminus of KY 787 (Calvert Drive). The two highways curve to the south-southeast and intersect the eastern terminus of KY 3075 (Sheehan Bridge Road). They curve to the southeast and begin traveling along the southeastern edge of Reidland. They cross over Interstate 24 (I-24) and then split. KY 284 leaves Reidland and continues to the southeast, curves to the east-northeast, and meets its eastern terminus, an intersection with US 68 (Benton Road).

== Major intersections ==
The entire route is in McCracken County.

Location	mi	km	Destinations	Notes
Paducah	0.0	0.0	US 60 / US 62 (Irvin Cobb Drive) – LaCenter, Bardwell	Western terminus
Paducah	0.2	0.32	KY 2187 south (Husband Road)	Northern terminus of KY 2187
Woodlawn-Oakdale	1.1	1.8	KY 450 (Silk Tree Boulevard) to I-24 / I-24 BL / KY 1954	
Reidland	4.1	6.6	KY 131 north (Benton Road) / KY 1887 east (Park Road)	Western end of KY 131 concurrency; western terminus of KY 1887
Reidland	4.5	7.2	KY 787 south (Calvert Drive)	Northern terminus of KY 787
Reidland	4.8	7.7	KY 3075 west (Sheehan Bridge Road)	Eastern terminus of KY 3075
Reidland	6.3	10.1	KY 131 south (Said Road) – Symsonia	Eastern end of KY 131 concurrency
	6.8	10.9	US 68 (Benton Road) – Reidland	Eastern terminus
1.000 mi = 1.609 km; 1.000 km = 0.621 mi
