= Kentucky Route 348 =

State highway in Kentucky, United States

Kentucky Route 348
- KY 348 highlighted in red

Route information
- Maintained by KYTC
- Length: 20.566 mi (33.098 km)

Major junctions
- West end: KY 1241 south of Saint Johns
- KY 994 near Freemont; KY 450 northwest of Symsonia; KY 131 / KY 534 in Symsonia; I-69 in Benton
- East end: US 641 / KY 58 in Benton

Location
- Country: United States
- State: Kentucky
- Counties: McCracken, Graves, Marshall

Highway system
- Kentucky State Highway System; Interstate; US; State; Parkways
← KY 347	→ KY 350

Kentucky Route 348 (KY 348) is a 20.566-mile-long (33.098 km) state highway in the U.S. state of Kentucky. The highway connects mostly rural areas of McCracken, Graves, and Marshall counties with Symsonia and Benton.

== Route description ==
=== McCracken County ===
KY 348 begins at an intersection with KY 1241 (Mayfield Road) south of Saint Johns, within McCracken County. This intersection is next to Woodlawn Memorial Gardens cemetery. It travels to the east and passes Dunaway Cemetery. It intersects the southern terminus of KY 1014 (Houser Road). It curves to the east-southeast and crosses over some railroad tracks of the Central Illinois Railroad (CIR). It intersects KY 994 (Old Mayfield Road / Mayfield–Paducah Road). The highway intersects the southern terminus of KY 1954 (Husband Road). After crossing Arnold Branch, it intersects the western terminus of KY 1255 (Bonds Road) and curves to the south-southwest. It curves to the south-southeast and crosses over Camp Creek before entering Hardmoney. There, it intersects the northern terminus of KY 1684 (Hardmoney Road) and curves to the east-southeast. It then enters Graves County.

=== Graves and Marshall counties ===
KY 348 curves to the southeast and intersects the southern terminus of KY 450 (Oaks Road). It crosses over the West Fork Clarks River and enters Symsonia. There, it intersects KY 131, travels north of Symsonia Elementary School, intersects the northern terminus of KY 534, passes Symsonia Cemetery, and intersects the northern terminus of KY 1949. This last intersection is on the eastern edge of Symsonia. It crosses over Lick Creek and enters Marshall County. KY 348 passes Freezor Cemetery and intersects the northern terminus of KY 1490 (Elva Road). It travels south of New Harmony Cemetery and crosses over Middle Fork Creek. The highway intersects the northern terminus of KY 2606 (Jackson School Road). It crosses over Little Bee Creek and enter Benton. It curves to the east-southeast and crosses over Bee Creek and intersects the northern terminus of KY 1558 (Ivey Road). It curves to the east-northeast and temporarily leaves the city limits of Benton. While out of the city, it has an interchange with the Purchase Parkway (future Interstate 69 (I-69)). After it re-enters Benton, it continues to the east-southeast and meets its eastern terminus, an intersection with US 641/KY 58 (Main Street / Poplar Street) on one-way pairs.

== Major intersections ==
County	Location	mi	km	Destinations	Notes
McCracken		0.000	0.000	KY 1241 (Mayfield Road)	Western terminus
McCracken		2.166	3.486	KY 1014 north (Houser Road)	Southern terminus of KY 1014
McCracken		3.658	5.887	KY 994 (Old Mayfield Road / Mayfield–Paducah Road)	
McCracken		4.063	6.539	KY 1954 north (Husband Road)	Southern terminus of KY 1954
McCracken		5.090	8.192	KY 1255 east (Bonds Road)	Western terminus of KY 1255
McCracken	Hardmoney	6.121	9.851	KY 1684 south (Hardmoney Road)	Northern terminus of KY 1684
Graves		8.418	13.547	KY 450 north (Oaks Road)	Southern terminus of KY 450
Graves	Symsonia	10.086	16.232	KY 131	
Graves	Symsonia	10.408	16.750	KY 534 south	Northern terminus of KY 534
Graves	Symsonia	10.673	17.177	KY 1949 south	Northern terminus of KY 1949
Marshall		13.466	21.671	KY 1490 south (Elva Road)	Northern terminus of KY 1490
Marshall		18.021	29.002	KY 2606 south (Jackson School Road)	Northern terminus of KY 2606
Marshall	Benton	18.986	30.555	KY 1558 south (Ivey Road)	Northern terminus of KY 1558
Marshall		19.734	31.759	I-69 – Fulton, Calvert City	I-69 exit 43
Marshall	Benton	20.566	33.098	US 641 / KY 58 (Main Street / Poplar Street) – Murray, Eddyville	Eastern terminus; one-way pairs
1.000 mi = 1.609 km; 1.000 km = 0.621 mi
