= Kentucky Route 131 =

State highway in Kentucky, United States

Kentucky Route 131

Route information
- Maintained by KYTC
- Length: 20.817 mi (33.502 km)

Major junctions
- South end: KY 58 near Mayfield
- I-69 near Mayfield
- North end: US 62 in Reidland

Location
- Country: United States
- State: Kentucky
- Counties: Graves, McCracken

Highway system
- Kentucky State Highway System; Interstate; US; State; Parkways
← KY 130	→ KY 132

Kentucky Route 131 (KY 131) is a 20.817-mile (33.502 km) long state highway in Kentucky that runs from Kentucky Route 58 northeast of Mayfield to U.S. Route 62 in Reidland via Smysonia and Reidland.

== Major intersections ==
County	Location	mi	km	Destinations	Notes
Graves		0.000	0.000	KY 58	Southern terminus
Graves		1.090	1.754	I-69 – Benton, Mayfield, Fulton	I-69 exit 27
Graves		3.510	5.649	KY 1374 east (Trace Creek Church Road)	Western terminus of KY 1374
Graves		4.555	7.331	KY 483 east	Western terminus of KY 483
Graves		6.965	11.209	KY 301 south / Old Mayfield Road	Northern terminus of KY 301
Graves		7.846	12.627	KY 1684 north	Southern terminus of KY 1684
Graves		9.445	15.200	KY 849 west	Eastern terminus of KY 849
Graves	Smysonia	12.887	20.740	KY 348	
McCracken	Reidland	18.043	29.037	KY 284 east (Benton Road)	South end of KY 284 overlap
McCracken	Reidland	19.510	31.398	KY 3075 west (Sheehan Bridge Road)	Eastern terminus of KY 3075
McCracken	Reidland	19.813	31.886	KY 787 south (Calvert Drive)	Northern terminus of KY 787
McCracken	Reidland	20.255	32.597	KY 284 west (Benton Street) / KY 1887 east (Park Road)	North end of KY 284 overlap; western terminus of KY 1887
McCracken	Reidland	20.817	33.502	US 62 (Kentucky Dam Road)	Interchange; northern terminus; no access from US 62 west to KY 131 south
1.000 mi = 1.609 km; 1.000 km = 0.621 mi
