= Oh How I Waited =

1970 song by Ron Lowry

Song by Ron Lowry

from the album Marry Me
- B-side: "Look At Me"
- Released: July 1970
- Genre: Country
- Length: 2:10
- Label: Republic 1415
- Songwriter(s): Les Reed, Geoff Stephens
- Producer(s): Charlie Adams

Ron Lowry singles chronology
"River Of My Mind" (1970)	"Oh How I Waited" (1970)	"Temporary" (1970)

"Oh How I Waited" is a minor hit in 1970 for Ron Lowry. It was the second hit for Lowry in the United States. Previously that year he had done very well with "Marry Me".

== Background ==
"Oh How I Waited" bw "Look At Me" was released on Republic 1415 in July 1970. It was Lowry's third single on the record label. With "Marry Me", the song peaked at #39 earlier that year.

== Chart performance ==
In the July 18 issue of Billboard, "Oh How I Waited" with its strong rhythm was predicted to make the Country Top 20 and surpass his previous hit. In the issued dated September 19, 1970, it peaked at No. 65 on the country singles chart.
