= Hard money =

Hard money may refer to:

- Hard currency, globally traded currency that can serve as a reliable and stable store of value
- Hard money (policy), currency backed by precious metal
- "Hard money" donations to candidates for political office (tightly regulated, as opposed to unregulated "soft money")
- "Hard money" funding for academic research (consistently flowing, as opposed to "soft money" provided by competitive grants)
- Hard money loans, an asset-based loan financing secured by the value of a parcel of real estate
- Hardmoney, Kentucky, a community in the United States
