= Ray Sanders =

Ray Sanders may refer to:

- Ray Sanders (baseball) (1916–1983), American baseball player
- Ray Sanders (singer) (1935–2019), American country music singer
