= Pete Lyles House =

Historic house in Kentucky, United States

- U.S. National Register of Historic Places
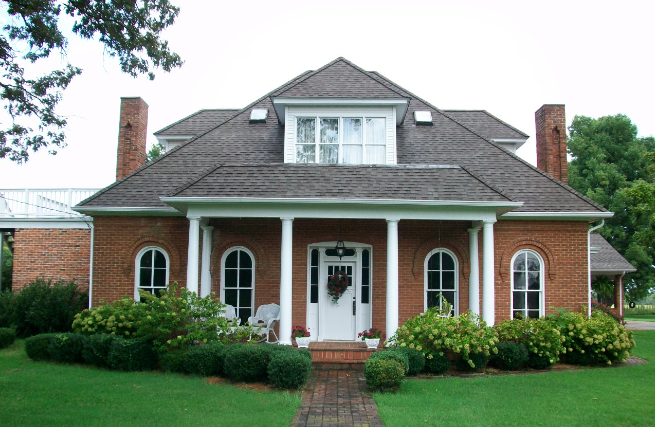

- Location within Kentucky Location within the United States
- Nearest city: Symsonia, Kentucky
- Coordinates: 36°55′7″N 88°30′54″W
- Area: 3.3 acres (1.3 ha)
- Built: 1865
- Architectural style: Italianate, Greek Revival
- NRHP reference No.: 06001202
- Added to NRHP: December 26, 2006

The Pete Lyles House is a historic home located at 302 Kentucky Route 348 in Symsonia, Kentucky. The house was built in 1865 following the conclusion of the Civil War. The house's design incorporates Italianate and Greek Revival features and was the first Italianate home in Graves County. The home is listed on the National Register of Historic Places.
