= Bob Sikora =

American restaurateur

- Occupation: Businessman

Bob Sikora is a restaurateur and businessman. He has also been involved in music management and once managed musician Ron Lowry in the 1970s.

== Background ==
When Sikora was 10 years of age, he and his family moved to Arizona from Huntington, West Virginia. At the age of 15, Sikora dropped out of school and got work frying hamburgers at McDonald's on Central Avenue and Indian School Road. In addition to making burgers he cleaned the place from midnight to 6 a.m. In 1959 at the age of 20, he got a small loan and along with his savings, he opened his own restaurant, Bob's Pancake House which was located near Camelback Road and 20th Street. For the next two years he worked there seven days a week until he sold the business and ran a few more. By 1964 he opened Magoos nightclub. Two years after that, he opened a 19,000-square-foot nightclub which became the legendary Mr. Lucky's. Located on Grand Avenue, the club had two different genres of music with country music upstairs and rock 'n' roll downstairs. Well-known acts such as Waylon Jennings, Glen Campbell and Willie Nelson played at the club.

== Music management ==
One music act that Sikora managed was Ron Lowry. In the February 9, 1969 edition of the Arizona Republic, Ron Lowry (then called Butch Lowry) was said to be Bob Sikora's latest country-western discovery and was going to have a record out on the Dot label shortly. The Woody Starr song, "All Over Now", was produced by Sikora. At the time, Lowry was appearing at Sikora's Mr Lucky's club. In March, song he produced was released on Dot 45–17216. That month it was getting played in Phoenix on KTUF and KRDS. In June, Record World reported the song at #10 on the Ray L. Linn list for Radio WOLA in Jackson, Michigan. Lowry would have success with the hit "Marry Me" in 1970.
