= Interstate 24 Tennessee River Bridge =

There are two bridges that cross the Tennessee River on Interstate 24:

- Luther Draffen Bridge in Kentucky, completed in 1975.
- Holman J. Walker Bridge in Tennessee, completed in 1967.
