= Interstate 24 in Kentucky =

Interstate Highway in Kentucky, United States

Interstate 24
- I-24 highlighted in red

Route information
- Maintained by KYTC
- Length: 93.373 mi (150.269 km)
- Existed: August 18, 1964–present
- History: Completed May 23, 1980
- NHS: Entire route

Major junctions
- West end: I-24 at the Illinois state line near Paducah
- US 60 / I-24 BL in Paducah; US 45 / US 62 in Paducah; US 68 in Paducah; I-69 in Calvert City; US 62 / US 641 in Kuttawa; I-69 / Western Kentucky Parkway in Eddyville; US 68 in Cadiz; I-169 near Hopkinsville; US 41 Alt. on the Oak Grove–Hopkinsville line
- East end: I-24 at the Tennessee state line near Oak Grove

Location
- Country: United States
- State: Kentucky
- Counties: McCracken, Marshall, Livingston, Lyon, Caldwell, Trigg, Christian

Highway system
- Interstate Highway System; Main; Auxiliary; Suffixed; Business; Future; Kentucky State Highway System; Interstate; US; State; Parkways
← US 23	→ KY 24

Interstate 24 (I-24) is part of the Interstate Highway System that runs 316.36 miles (509.13 km) from Pulleys Mill, Illinois, to Chattanooga, Tennessee. In Kentucky, the Interstate runs in a northwest-to-southeast alignment in the western part of the state through the Jackson Purchase and Pennyroyal Plateau regions, from the Ohio River at the Illinois border to the Tennessee line near Fort Campbell and Clarksville, Tennessee. The Interstate runs for a total of 93.37 miles (150.26 km) in Kentucky, serving Paducah and providing access to other cities via U.S. and state routes. It also crosses the Tennessee River and Cumberland River near Land Between the Lakes National Recreation Area. Unlike many Interstate Highways, I-24 does not closely parallel any U.S. Route in Kentucky. Whitehaven, a historic house in Paducah built in 1865, is used as the western Kentucky welcome center.

When the Federal-Aid Highway Act of 1956 was passed, no Interstate Highway was allocated for western Kentucky, and the road that became I-24 was planned to run between Nashville and Chattanooga. Around this time, Kentucky officials began lobbying for an Interstate Highway in this region, and the state, along with Tennessee, Illinois, and Missouri began to advocate for a new Interstate between Nashville and St. Louis. After many years of debate, the states reached an agreement for the highway's alignment in 1963, and the following year, the federal Bureau of Public Roads approved an extension of I-24 into Kentucky. Construction on I-24 in Kentucky began in 1967 and was completed in 1980, making it the last mainline Interstate Highway in the state to be finished. In 2018, a section of I-69 was routed onto a concurrency with I-24 as part of an extension of this Interstate into Kentucky.

== Route description ==
I-24/I-69 approaching the Luther Draffen Bridge across the Tennessee River near Calvert City.

I-24 is maintained by the Kentucky Transportation Cabinet (KYTC), along with all other Interstate, US, and state highways in Kentucky. In 2025, annual average daily traffic counts ranged from 21,740 vehicles east of the eastern interchange with I-69 to 44,483 vehicles between US 45 and KY 1954 in Paducah.

I-24 enters the Jackson Purchase region of western Kentucky from Illinois on a north–south alignment on the Interstate 24 Ohio River Bridge across the Ohio River. This two-span bridge is a tied-arch bridge, and has a total length of 5,623 feet (1,714 m). Immediately within McCracken County, the route begins gradually veering southeast and enters the western fringes of Paducah a few miles later. In Paducah, the Interstate continues to shift southeast and has an interchange with US 60. A short distance later is an interchange with US 62 and US 45, which are connected via frontage roads. This interchange also provides access to the western I-24 Kentucky welcome center at Whitehaven, which is the only historic house in the United States used as a rest area. Passing through the Hendron and Farley communities adjacent to Paducah, the highway shifts into a direct east–west alignment several miles later and crosses the Clarks River before reaching an interchange with US 68 in Reidland. The route then enters Marshall County and, about seven miles (11 km) later, has an interchange with I-69 and a connector road to US 62 and Calvert City to the north. Here, it begins a concurrency with the former. The two Interstates then shift northeast and have an interchange with US 62 about one mile (1.6 km) later. A short distance later, the Interstates cross the Tennessee River on the 2,108-foot-long (643 m) Luther Draffen Bridge, which is a two-span tied-arch bridge. Here, the Interstates enter the Pennyroyal Plateau and Livingston County just north and downstream of Kentucky Dam and its Kentucky Lake impoundment. The highways then have an interchange with Kentucky Route 453 (KY 453) north of Lake City and Land Between the Lakes National Recreation Area. They then cross the Cumberland River on the Ralph Smith Bridge about three miles (4.8 km) later into Lyon County a few miles north of Barkley Dam and Lake Barkley.

I-24 westbound near Eddyville, approaching I-69/Western Kentucky Parkway.

Gradually veering eastward, the two Interstates reach KY 93/US 62/US 641 near Kuttawa and Eddyville. Less than two miles (3.2 km) later, I-69 splits off to the northeast at a trumpet interchange, and I-24 passes through Mineral Mound State Park, veering southeast a few miles later. Passing through a mostly wooded area, the Interstate crosses KY 93 without an interchange, and a short distance beyond has an interchange with KY 293 near the Kentucky State Penitentiary. It then crosses Eddy Creek and an inlet of Lake Barkley a few miles later. Some distance later, the freeway enters a landscape consisting mostly of farmland and dips briefly into the southern tip of Caldwell County, where it has an interchange with KY 139. The Interstate then enters Trigg County and crosses the Muddy Fork Little River a short distance later. About five miles (8.0 km) later, the Interstate has an interchange with US 68 and KY 80 between Cadiz and Hopkinsville. The highway then crosses into Christian County a few miles later. Passing over the next several miles through additional farmland and bypassing Hopkinsville to the southwest, the Interstate reaches the southern terminus of I-169 at a trumpet interchange. About four miles (6.4 km) later, the Interstate has a partial cloverleaf interchange with US 41 Alternate, which provides access to Hopkinsville to the north and Fort Campbell and Clarksville, Tennessee, to the south. I-24 then crosses into Tennessee about five miles (8.0 km) later.

== History ==
=== Predecessors and early planning ===
Before the advent of the automobile, several ferries operated crossings in western Kentucky across the Ohio, Tennessee, and Cumberland rivers. When the United States Numbered Highway System was established in 1926, several roads in western Kentucky were given designations. In 1929, the Brookport Bridge on US 45 was completed across the Ohio River between Paducah and Brookport, Illinois. In 1956, Congress passed the Federal-Aid Highway Act of 1956, which created and authorized federal funding for the Interstate Highway System. The highway that became Interstate 24 was authorized between Nashville and Chattanooga, as had been planned since the late 1930s. Around this time, officials in western Kentucky began advocating for an Interstate Highway here, and the state highway department began studying potential routes. In 1957, officials in Kentucky, Illinois, Missouri, and Tennessee began an effort to extend I-24 west of its allocated western terminus in Nashville to St. Louis. They argued that such a highway was needed to improve connectivity between St. Louis and Nashville, as well as between Atlanta and Chicago. The new route was also stressed because of the importance of Fort Campbell, established in 1941 as the home of the 101st Airborne Division; and the Paducah Gaseous Diffusion Plant, which was established in 1950 by the United States Atomic Energy Commission and became one of the top producers of enriched uranium during the Cold War. On October 18, 1957, an extension through western Kentucky to I-57 in Cairo, Illinois, was included in a list of potential additions to the Interstate system, but not designated since an agreement for its location hadn't been reached.

The four states had difficulty reaching an agreement for the routing, and spent the next several years studying different proposals. The first major concept, which evolved during the first three meetings over the matter between the Kentucky, Tennessee, and Illinois highway departments in December 1957, had I-24 run concurrently with I-40 west of Nashville for about 40 miles (64 km) to near Dickson, Tennessee, before splitting off to the northwest and crossing the Kentucky Lake impoundment of the Tennessee River a few miles before entering Kentucky, and avoiding the Cumberland River completely. From here, the route passed through Murray, Mayfield, and west of Paducah in a north–south direction. It then crossed the Ohio River and terminated with I-57 near Pulleys Mill, Illinois. The departments also explored a routing between Nashville and Evansville, Indiana, to follow US 41 and an alignment with an Ohio River crossing near Golconda, Illinois. The departments transmitted a letter detailing their recommendation to the Kentucky Division Engineer of the Bureau of Public Roads, the predecessor agency to the Federal Highway Administration, on December 20, 1957. They then submitted a joint request to the BPR for this route on January 15, 1958. One month later, their engineers recommended the Ohio River crossing near Paducah. The BPR did not act on this request, and instead favored a terminus near Cairo.

=== New proposals and routing debate ===
A map produced by The Nashville Tennessean in 1963 showing some of the proposed routes. The unshaded alignment was proposed by the three states in late 1957, and the dashed route was proposed by the Kentucky highway department in early 1961.

In late 1958, a new "straight-line" route to the east was proposed that crossed the Ohio River near Salem, passed through Eddyville, Princeton, Cadiz, and Hopkinsville, and entered Tennessee near Clarksville. To the west, this route would continue straight to St. Louis. This was proposed by a group composed of delegates from cities along this route, who argued it would be more cost-effective. By 1959, proposals once again called for the Interstate to turn west and cross the Ohio River near Cairo. It would then cross the Mississippi River into Missouri a short distance later and continue to St. Louis. In addition to the BPR, this concept was reportedly influenced by Missouri officials. In early 1960, the Kentucky highway department once again reviewed the two discarded alignments from 1957, but determined on May 27 that they were unable to estimate the costs. In August 1960, the BPR ordered new studies of the Nashville-to-Cairo route. When Henry Ward became the state highway commissioner in September 1960, additional proposals began to arise, including eastern alignments similar to the 1958 proposal. Earlier that year, officials in Tennessee had also urged the BPR to delay approval so they could study alternate routes, including near Fort Campbell. During a meeting of the American Association of State Highway Officials in Detroit in November 1960, an agreement was reached to consider the Cairo terminus and for each of the states to continue studying their respective alignments. Tennessee officials also revealed that they now preferred an eastern alignment near Fort Campbell. Governor Bert Combs, who once owned shares in a motel in Gilbertsville, and other state officials were later accused of trying to shift the route to the east for their personal benefit. A toll road was also proposed between Princeton and Paducah if I-24 was not built in the area.

On March 18, 1961, the highway department presented their plans for an eastern alignment to the other departments at a meeting in Chicago. This alignment would cross into Kentucky near Fort Campbell, join the Western Kentucky Parkway west of Princeton, cross north of Barkley and Kentucky lakes, and skirt Paducah before continuing to Cairo. Illinois officials requested a crossing near Paducah that terminated with I-57 near Pulleys Mill also be studied, which Kentucky officials agreed to. By 1963, two major alignments were under consideration. The first was a route through Murray, Mayfield, and Paducah that mirrored the 1957 proposal and terminated with I-57 near Pulleys Mill. The second alignment was effectively the 1961 proposal that terminated in Cairo. The latter alignment was once again favored by many officials in Tennessee and western Kentucky, and the federal government still preferred the Cairo terminus. The states also incorporated a new Interstate Highway, which was once proposed to be numbered I-24W, between I-55 in Hayti, Missouri, and I-40 in Jackson, Tennessee. This included a then-unbuilt bridge across the Mississippi River that had been proposed since the 1930s.

On September 17, 1963, the governors of the four states, in a meeting with President John F. Kennedy, U.S. Secretary of Commerce Luther H. Hodges, and BPR Administrator Rex Marion Whitton, reached a compromise on the alignment for I-24's extension. This alignment largely consisted of the eastern proposal through Kentucky, but shifted to the Paducah-to-Pulleys Mill alignment instead of continuing to Cairo or St. Louis. They also urged approval of the Hayti-to-Jackson Interstate, and Missouri Governor John M. Dalton said that his state would not accept the I-24 routing unless a bridge between Missouri and Tennessee was approved. However, Dalton conceded that the Cairo alignment, which would have crossed the Mississippi River approximately 20 miles (32 km) west of the Ohio River crossing, would have been too costly. This routing still remained contentious in Kentucky, and became an issue in the gubernatorial election later that year when it threatened to shift the historically-Democratic vote in the Jackson Purchase area to Republican nominee Louie Nunn. Democrat nominee Ned Breathitt, who ultimately won, proposed an east–west toll road in the region between Fulton and Kentucky Dam as consolation. On August 18, 1964, the BPR approved the extension between Nashville and Pulleys Mill, establishing I-24 in Kentucky for the first time. They also authorized the westernmost portion of the other Interstate Highway between Missouri and Tennessee, which they designated I-155, but did not approve the entire route to Jackson. Controversy still endured, however, and in 1965, a study that was ordered by Breathitt examined the feasibility of moving roughly the easternmost 40 miles (64 km) of I-24 to run about six miles (9.7 km) closer to Hopkinsville. In December of that year, engineers employed on the study recommended against this, citing no cost-benefit evidence of removing the highway from the alignment approved by the BPR. This effectively settled the debate and allowed preliminary engineering and right-of-way acquisition to begin.

=== Construction ===
A groundbreaking ceremony for the first stretch of I-24 in Kentucky, the approaches for the bridges over Eddy Creek, was held on December 6, 1967. Construction on the Ohio River bridge began in June 1968, and was initially slated for completion in 1970. However, the project experienced many delays caused by poor weather and faulty welds that were repaired with bolts. The first contract for the Tennessee River bridges was awarded in July 1970, and they were effectively completed in July 1975, but not opened to traffic since the approaching sections were incomplete. Work on the Cumberland River bridge began in 1972, but issues caused by unusual rock formations at the site, believed to have been formed by the 1811–1812 New Madrid earthquakes or earlier seismic events, delayed completion and resulted in the cost nearly tripling. On October 18, 1974, the stretch between US 45 in Metropolis, Illinois, and US 60 in Paducah, including the Ohio River bridge, opened to traffic, after many delays. The approximately 32-mile (51 km) segment between US 68 near Cadiz and Hopkinsville and US 79 in Clarksville was jointly opened to traffic by both states on September 12, 1975. In late October 1977, the stretch between US 68 in Reidland and US 62 east of Calvert City was completed. The section between US 60 in Paducah and US 68 in Reidland was opened and dedicated by Governor Julian Carroll on December 15, 1978. The 2.5-mile (4.0 km) section between US 62 near Calvert City and KY 453, including the Tennessee River bridge, was opened to traffic on October 25, 1979. On December 10, 1979, the stretch between KY 453 and US 62/US 641 in Eddyville, including the Cumberland River bridge, was opened. On March 20, 1980, the 2.7-mile (4.3 km) stretch in Eddyville between US 62/US 641 and the Western Kentucky Parkway (now I-69), along with the westernmost 3.4 miles (5.5 km) of the latter route, was opened. I-24 was completed when the 23-mile (37 km) section opened to traffic from what is now I-69 to US 68 between Cadiz and Hopkinsville on May 23, 1980.

=== Later history ===
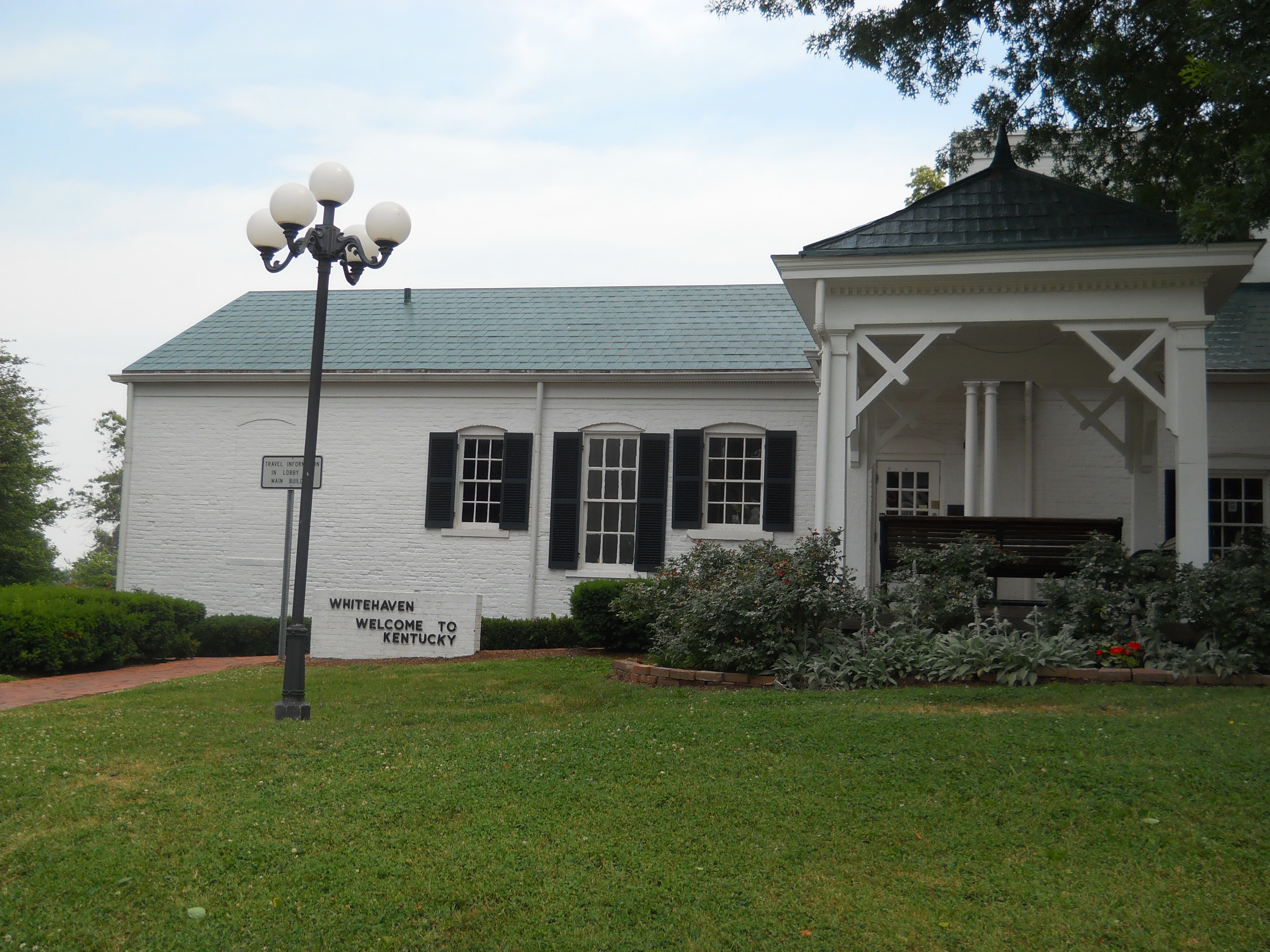
Whitehaven, the only historic house used as a rest area in the United States.

In its early years, the Ohio River bridge was inspected more frequently due to design problems during construction. On August 3, 1979, the bridge was closed to all traffic after structural problems were discovered, including 119 cracks that resulted from defective welding in the tie girders. On October 16, 1980, the westbound span reopened with one lane in each direction and a prohibition of trucks and other heavy vehicles. Both spans fully reopened to all traffic with all four lanes on May 12, 1981.

In 1981, Governor John Y. Brown Jr. and transportation secretary Frank Metts suggested that the Anderson-Smith House, a historic plantation house dating to the 1860s, be used as the western I-24 Kentucky welcome center. The home, which was abandoned and had fallen into disrepair, had been sold to Paducah Junior College earlier that year, which could not afford to restore it. After a brief archaeological restoration, the house was carefully restored using as much original material as possible and opened as a rest area, renamed Whitehaven, on June 23, 1983. The house was listed on the National Register of Historic Places on March 1, 1984.

An extension of I-69 through Kentucky was proposed under the 1991 Intermodal Surface Transportation Efficiency Act (ISTEA) as part of a corridor to facilitate trade between Canada and Mexico. This extension was further spearheaded by the enactment of the North American Free Trade Agreement (NAFTA) in 1994. This extension, sometimes considered part of the unofficial NAFTA superhighway, was proposed to utilize some of the existing controlled-access parkways between the Tennessee state line and the Ohio River at the Indiana state line. On May 15, 2006, then-Governor Ernie Fletcher announced that I-69 would run on a concurrency with I-24 for 17 miles (27 km) between the Purchase Parkway and the Western Kentucky Parkway, along with both parkways, and Future I-69 signs were posted soon thereafter. On November 20, 2015, a contract was awarded to reconstruct the purchase parkway interchange to eliminate the need to use loop ramps between I-24 and the future I-69. Work began on February 29, 2016, and the project was completed in early July 2018. This allowed I-69 to be signed along this section of I-24 and the Purchase Parkway for the first time. The interchange with US 60 in Paducah was reconstructed into a diverging diamond interchange in 2019.

== Exit list ==
County	Location	mi	km	Exit	Destinations	Notes
Ohio River		0.000	0.000		I-24 west – St. Louis, Chicago	Continuation into Illinois
Ohio River		0.000	0.000	Interstate 24 Ohio River Bridge		
McCracken	Paducah	2.958	4.760	3	KY 305 – Paducah	
McCracken	Paducah	4.328	6.965	4	I-24 BL east / US 60 – Paducah, Wickliffe	Western terminus of I-24 Bus.; access to Kentucky Oaks Mall
McCracken	Paducah	6.387– 6.865	10.279– 11.048	7	US 45 / US 62 – Bardwell, Mayfield	Access to Whitehaven welcome center
McCracken		11.035	17.759	11	I-24 BL west / KY 1954 (Husband Road) – Paducah	Eastern terminus of I-24 Bus.
McCracken		16.153	25.996	16	US 68 – Paducah	
Marshall		24.961	40.171	25	I-69 south to US 62 – Fulton, Calvert City	Western end of I-69 concurrency; signed as exits 25A (south) and 25B (north)
Marshall	Calvert City	26.565	42.752	27	US 62 – Kentucky Dam, Calvert City	
Tennessee River		29.242– 29.442	47.060– 47.382	Luther Draffen Bridge		
Livingston		30.729	49.454	31	KY 453 – Grand Rivers, Smithland	Serves Land Between the Lakes National Recreation Area
Cumberland River		33.774– 33.938	54.354– 54.618	Ralph Smith Bridge		
Lyon	Kuttawa	39.553	63.654	40	KY 93 / US 62 / US 641 – Eddyville, Kuttawa	
Lyon	Eddyville	41.647	67.024	42	I-69 north to Western Kentucky Parkway (KY 9001) – Henderson, Elizabethtown	Eastern end of I-69 concurrency; I-69 exit 68
Lyon		44.732	71.989	45	KY 293 – Princeton	
Caldwell		55.632	89.531	56	KY 139 – Princeton, Cadiz	
Trigg	Cadiz	65.313	105.111	65	US 68 / KY 80 – Cadiz, Hopkinsville	Serves Land Between the Lakes National Recreation Area
Christian		72.692	116.986	73	KY 117 – Newstead, Gracey	
Christian		81.243	130.748	81	I-169 north – Hopkinsville	Southern terminus of I-169, formerly known as the Pennyrile Parkway; exit 1 on I-169
Christian	Hopkinsville–Oak Grove line	85.608	137.773	86	US 41 Alt. – Hopkinsville, Fort Campbell	
Christian	Oak Grove	88.761	142.847	89	KY 115 – Oak Grove, Pembroke	Serves the Jefferson Davis Monument State Historic Site
Christian		93.373	150.269		I-24 east – Clarksville, Nashville	Continuation into Tennessee
1.000 mi = 1.609 km; 1.000 km = 0.621 mi: Closed/former; Concurrency terminus; Incomplete access; Unopened

== Paducah business loop ==
Interstate 24 Business
- Location: Paducah, Kentucky
- Length: 11.2 mi (18.0 km)
- Existed: 2002–present

Interstate 24 Business (I-24 Bus.) is an 11.2-mile-long (18.0 km) business loop of I-24 that travels through downtown Paducah, Kentucky. It begins at I-24 and US 60 at exit 4 and ends at I-24 and KY 1954 at exit 11. Originally designated as Interstate 24 Downtown (I-24 Dwtn.), the route was repurposed as I-24 Bus. in 2002, although it had been previously referred to as a business loop for a long time. The highway follows US 60, US 60 Bus., and KY 1954.

Major Intersections
The entire route is in McCracken County.

Location	mi	km	Destinations	Notes
Paducah	0.0	0.0	US 60 west (Hinkleville Road west) / I-24	Western terminus; western end of US 60 concurrency; I-24 exit 4
Paducah	1.9	3.1	KY 731 south (32nd Street)	Northern terminus of KY 731
Paducah	2.4	3.9	US 60 east (Joe Clifton Drive) US 60 Bus. east	Eastern end of US 60 concurrency; I-24 Bus. east follows US 60 Bus. east; US 60 east serves Baptist Health Paducah
Paducah	2.6	4.2	US 45 (H.C. Mathis Drive)	
Paducah	4.4	7.1	US 45 Bus. north (8th Street)	Western end of US 45 Bus. concurrency
Paducah	5.2	8.4	US 45 Bus. south (Kentucky Avenue)	Eastern end of US 45 Bus. concurrency
Paducah	8.2	13.2	US 60 Bus. west US 60 / US 62 KY 1954 east	I-24 Bus. west follows US 60 Bus. west; I-24 Bus. east follows KY 1954 east
Woodlawn-Oakdale	8.8	14.2	KY 450	
Woodlawn-Oakdale	10.9	17.5	KY 2187 north (Husband Road north)	Southern terminus of KY 2187
	11.2	18.0	KY 1954 east (Husband Road) / I-24 – Kentucky Dam, Nashville, St. Louis	Eastern terminus; eastern end of KY 1954 concurrency; I-24 exit 11
1.000 mi = 1.609 km; 1.000 km = 0.621 mi: Concurrency terminus

Interstate 24
Previous state: Illinois	Kentucky	Next state: Tennessee
