= Hard money (policy) =

Type of monetary policy

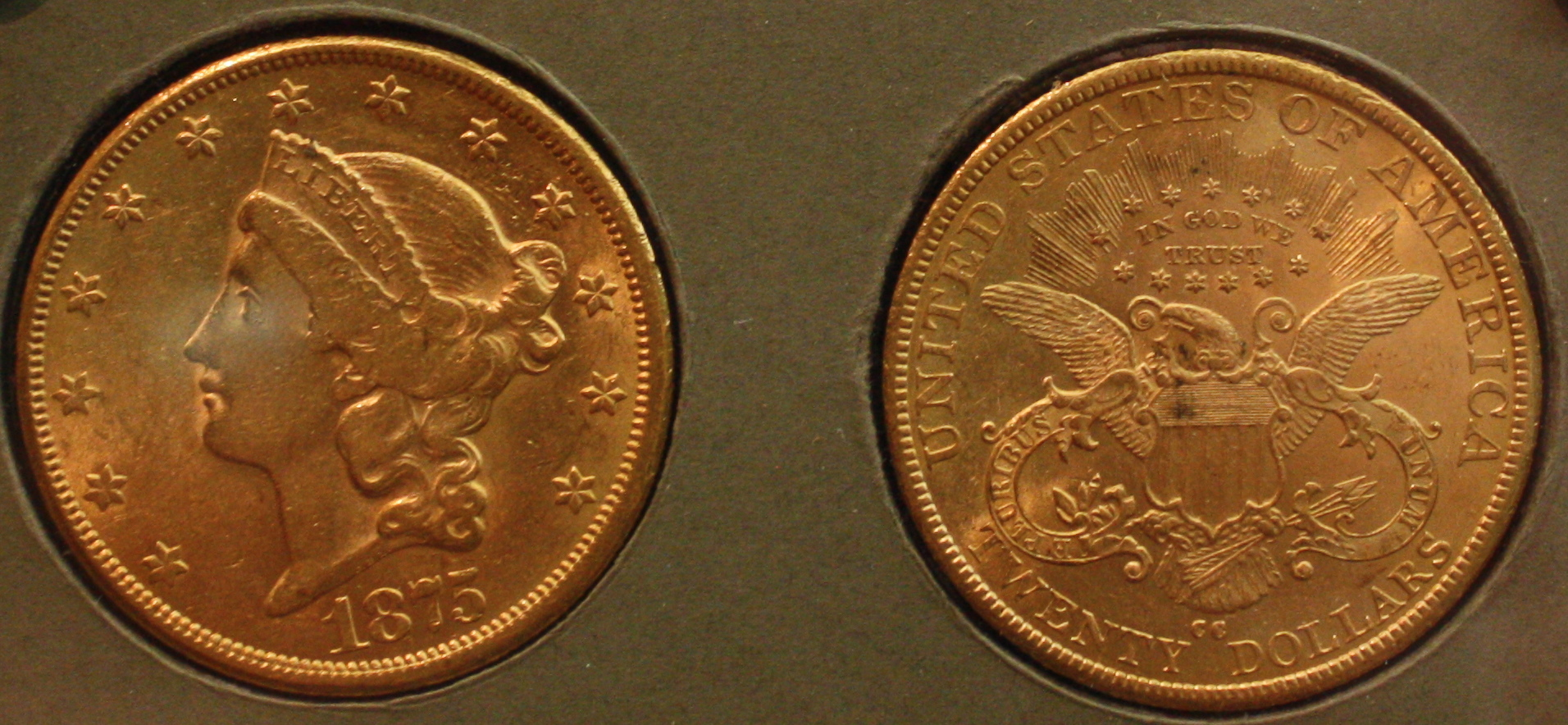
The 1875-CC Liberty Head design

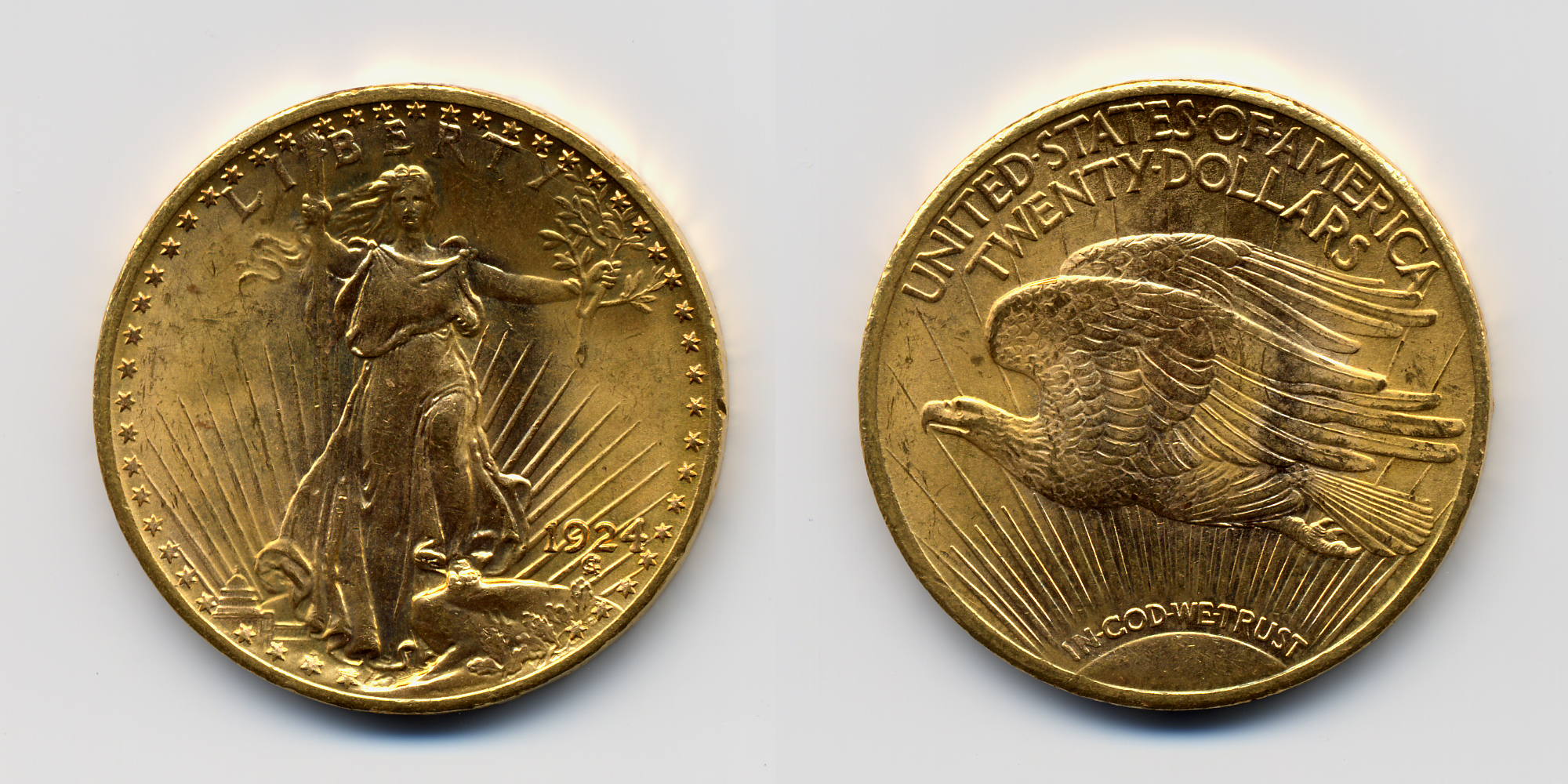
The 1924 Double eagle, Saint Gaudens' design

Hard money policies support a specie standard, usually gold or silver, typically implemented with representative money.

In 1836, when President Andrew Jackson's veto of the recharter of the Second Bank of the United States took effect, he issued the Specie Circular, an executive order that all public lands had to be purchased with hard money.

== Bentonian currency ==
In the US, hard money is sometimes referred to as Bentonian, after Senator Thomas Hart Benton, who was an advocate for the hard money policies of Andrew Jackson. In Benton's view, fiat currency favored rich urban Easterners at the expense of the small farmers and tradespeople of the West. He proposed a law requiring payment for federal land in hard currency only, which was defeated in Congress but later enshrined in an executive order, the Specie Circular.

== See also ==
- Gold standard
- Silver standard
- Bimetallic standard
- Bullion coin
- Digital gold currency
- Fractional reserve banking
- Free banking
- Hard money (disambiguation)
- Libertarianism
- Bitcoin
