= Oak Hill (Calvert City, Kentucky) =

Historic house in Kentucky, United States

- U.S. National Register of Historic Places
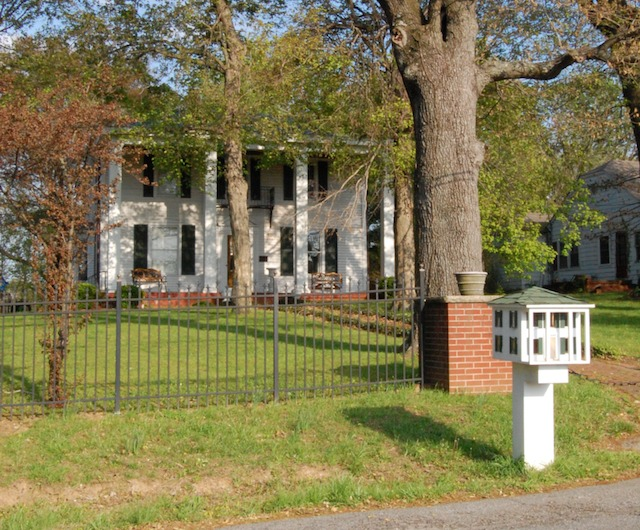

- Location within Kentucky Location within the United States
- Location: 26 Aspen St., Calvert City, Kentucky
- Coordinates: 37°1′50″N 88°20′52″W
- Area: 5 acres (2.0 ha)
- Built: 1853, 1949
- NRHP reference No.: 74000894
- Added to NRHP: December 31, 1974

Oak Hill, built in 1853, is an historic home located at 26 Aspen Street in Calvert City, Kentucky. It was built by Potilla Calvert, the founder of Calvert City and the man for whom the city was named. It was named a historic Kentucky landmark in August 1973. On December 31, 1974, it was added to the National Register of Historic Places.

The present appearance of the house was created in 1949 when any Victorian era features were removed or hidden. A two-story four-column portico with a second floor iron balcony and a Georgian style door frame were then added.
