= Ray Sanders (singer) =

American country music singer (1935–2019)

- Born: Raymon Sanders; October 1, 1935; Saint Johns, Kentucky, U.S.
- Died: October 13, 2019 (aged 84) Honolulu, Hawaii, U.S.
- Genres: Country
- Occupation: Singer
- Instrument: Vocals
- Years active: 1957–2019
- Label: Liberty; Imperial; United Artists; Republic; Hillside

Raymon Sanders (October 1, 1935 – October 13, 2019) was an American country music artist. Between 1960 and 1980, he charted fourteen times on the Hot Country Songs charts with singles released by Liberty, Imperial and United Artists labels. He also sang backing vocals for Ray Price.

== Background ==
Sanders was born in Saint Johns, Kentucky on October 1, 1935. He was originally a disc jockey in Elizabethtown, Kentucky, and later a performer at the Lincoln Jamboree and Renfro Valley Barn Dance. He recorded a few rockabilly songs in 1957 under the name Curly Sanders before making his Grand Ole Opry debut in 1959. A year later, he signed with Liberty, reaching #18 on the country charts with "A World So Full of Love" and #20 with "Lonelyville". In 1968, Sanders won Top New Male Vocalist at the Academy of Country Music.

He is also credited with putting singer Ron Lowry in touch with Gene Autry who signed him to his Republic label. Lowry would go on to have a hit with "Marry Me".

== Career ==
Sanders moved to Imperial Records in 1969, reaching number 22 with "Beer Drinkin' Music", and then to United Artists. By 1977, he was working in Riverside, California as a house act for a club called White Sands. Sanders also appeared on 5 episodes of Hee Haw as a background singer in 1971 and 1972.

== Death ==
Sanders died in Honolulu, Hawaii on October 13, 2019, at the age of 84.

== Discography ==
Title	Album details
Feeling Good Is Easy	Release date: 1969; Label: Imperial Records; Formats: LP
Judy	Release date: 1970; Label: United Artists Records; Formats: LP
A Rose by Any Other Name Alone	Release date: 1972; Label: United Artists Records; Formats: LP
I Don't Want to Be Alone Tonight	Release date: 1977; Label: Republic Records; Formats: LP
Love Position	Release date: 2002; Label: self-released; Formats: CD
Country Hits, Vol. 1	Release date: 2003; Label: self-released; Formats: CD
Ray Sanders and Friends	Release date: 2003; Label: self-released; Formats: CD
Living on the Edge	Release date: 2005; Label: self-released; Formats: CD
Ray Sanders Country	Release date: 2007; Label: Hillside; Formats: CD
Ray Sanders Sings Texas Dance Hall Music	Release date: 2008; Label: Hillside; Formats: CD
Funny How Time Slips Away	Release date: 2010; Label: Hillside; Formats: CD

=== Singles ===
Year	Single	Peak chart positions	Album
Year	Single	US Country	Album
1960	"A World So Full of Love"	18	singles only
1961	"Lonelyville"	20	singles only
1969	"Beer Drinkin' Music"	22	Feeling Good Is Easy
1969	"Three Tears (For the Sad, Hurt and Blue)"	73	Feeling Good Is Easy
1970	"Blame It on Rosey"	36	Judy
1970	"Judy"	38	Judy
1971	"Walk All Over Georgia"	58	single only
1971	"All I Ever Need Is You"	18	A Rose by Any Other Name Alone
1972	"A Rose by Any Other Name (Is Still a Rose)"	69	A Rose by Any Other Name Alone
1972	"Lucius Grinder"	67	single only
1973	"Another Way to Say Goodbye"	75	single only
1977	"I Don't Want to Be Alone Tonight"	56	I Don't Want to Be Alone Tonight
1978	"Tennessee"	91	I Don't Want to Be Alone Tonight
1980	"You're a Pretty Lady, Lady"	93	single only
