= Luther Draffen Bridge =

Bridge in Kentucky, United States

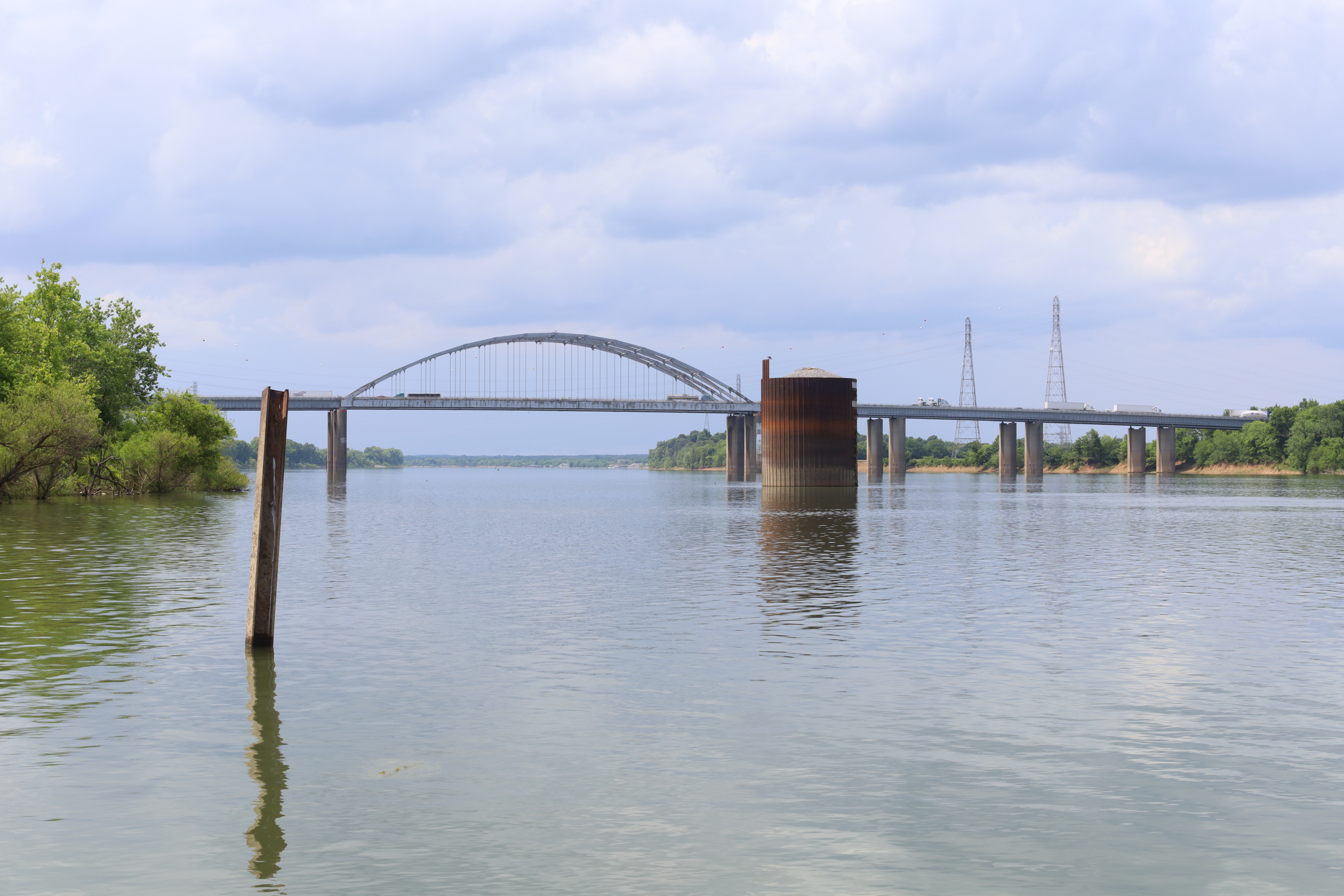
- Luther Draffen Bridge
- Coordinates: 37.02604°N 88.28588°W
- Carries: 4 lanes of I-24 / I-69
- Crosses: Tennessee River
- Locale: Marshall–Livingston County, Kentucky, near Calvert City

Characteristics
- Design: Tied-arch bridge
- Total length: 2,108 feet (643 m)
- Height: 87.3 feet (26.6 m)

History
- Construction end: July 1975
- Opened: October 25, 1979

Statistics
- Daily traffic: 31,467 (2024)

Location
- Interactive map of Luther Draffen Bridge

The Luther Draffen Bridge is a pair of tied-arch bridges that cross the Tennessee River on Interstates 24 and 69 in the U.S. state of Kentucky. It is also one of two crossings of the Tennessee River on I-24, the other being the Holman J. Walker Bridge in Tennessee.

== Description and history ==
The Luther Draffen Bridge consists of two 2,108-foot-long (643 m) spans across the Tennessee River near Calvert City, Kentucky, at river mile 21.1. The bridges span the border between Marshall and Livingston counties, and also the boundary between the Jackson Purchase and Pennyroyal Plateau regions of Kentucky. The spans are located immediately north and downstream of Kentucky Dam and the Kentucky Lake reservoir. The bridges are only about two miles (3.2 km) west of the Interstates' crossing of the Cumberland River, and are just north of the northern boundary of Land Between the Lakes National Recreation Area. The tied-arch main spans are 534 feet (163 m) long, and the steel weighs 1,584 short tons (1,437 t). Each span carries two traffic lanes and right shoulders. The bridges have a vertical clearance of 87.3 feet (26.6 m) above the main navigation channel. They were named the "Luther Draffen Bridge" in 1992 by the Kentucky General Assembly after a Marshall County banker and businessman who was a major influence in the Tennessee Valley Authority's decision to construct Kentucky Dam.

The first bids for construction of the bridge's approaches and abutments were solicited in April 1970, but rejected by the state highway department. The first contract was officially awarded three months later. The contract for the superstructure was awarded in December 1971. The steel arches were fabricated nearby, and transported to the site via barge. The spans were then hoisted 96 feet (29 m) above the river with hydraulic jacks on barges and slid horizontally into place and lowered 12 feet (3.7 m) onto the piers. This was the first time a prefabricated bridge arch was installed by sliding. The eastbound arch was installed on July 10-11, 1973, and the westbound arch was installed on September 26-27, 1973. The bridges were effectively completed in July 1975, but not opened to traffic at the time because work on the connecting segments of I-24 was incomplete. The bridges were opened on October 25, 1979, along with the full 2.5-mile (4.0 km) section between U.S. Route 62 and Kentucky Route 453. Their final cost was $13.5 million (equivalent to $60.9 million in 2024). I-69 was added to the bridges in July 2018 as part of an extension of this Interstate Highway into Kentucky.

== See also ==
- List of crossings of the Tennessee River
