= Ron Lowry =

American singer

- Also known as: Butch Lowry, Ron "Butch" Lowry,
- Born: July 6, 1944; Sayre, Oklahoma, U.S.
- Died: February 6, 2007 (aged 62) Goodyear, Arizona
- Occupation: Musician
- Instruments: drums, vocals
- Years active: 1960s to 2000s
- Labels: Dot, Republic, 50 States

Ron Lowry (July 6, 1944 – February 6, 2007) was an American singer who had a hit in the country music charts with "Marry Me" in 1970. He also had a minor hit with "Oh How I Waited".

== Background ==
Ron Lowry was born on July 6, 1944, in Sayre, Oklahoma, United States. Growing up in Douglas, Arizona, and Roswell, New Mexico, Lowry was already an accomplished drummer at the age of 14. By the time he was 17 years old he was adding his vocals to his fathers band while playing the drums. In 1964, Lowry was drafted into the army and he served in France and Germany. Also at that time he worked with The Wade Jackson Organization and backed various country artists on U.S.O. tours. Back in the US, he got a recording contract with Gene Autry's Republic Record label. His first release was a song that was previously recorded by Engelbert Humperdinck. "Marry Me", bw World Champion Fool, was one of the biggest selling songs for the label. During his career he was managed by Bob Sikora and had worked with producer Bill Williams.

== Career ==
=== 1960s ===
Earlier in his career, he was known as Butch Lowry. In spite of achieving a moderate level of popularity, he was having difficulty in getting his material recorded. In the February 9, 1969, edition of the Arizona Republic, he was said to be Bob Sikora's latest country-western discovery and was going to have a record out on the Dot label shortly. The tune, "All Over Now" was written by Woody Starr of Radio KTUF, and was produced by Sikora. At the time, Lowry was appearing at Mr Lucky's which was Sikora's large night club on the west side of Phoenix. In March, the Bob Sikora produced "It's All Over Now" bw "Shutting Out The Light" was released on Dot 45-17216. That month it was getting played in Phoenix on KTUF and KRDS. In June, Record World reported the song at #10 on the Ray L. Linn list for Radio WOLA in Jackson, Michigan. Also that year, Stan Bronson's Stan Bronson And The Girl From San Juan which was released. Lowry played drums on it.

=== 1970s ===
Lowry was signed to Gene Autry's record label as a result of Ray Sanders putting him in touch with Autrey. Autrey recognized his talent and signed him up straight away. In February, 1970, Lowry was in Las Vegas promoting his release which was out on Autrey's Republic label. On March 14, in an The Arizona Republic newspaper article about him, it was reported that Lowry had been in Vegas for a few days to promote his record as well as seeing Elvis Presley appear. The following day he was to head off to Nashville to record an album with a new single, possibly a composition by Harry Goodman the brother of Benny. There was also a possibility of recording "Till the Day I Die" by Woody Starr and "So Hard to Get by (Since you're Been Gone)", a Lowry composition and several standards. It was also reported that Marry Me" was now being released throughout Europe with expectations of international popularity for the song. Also on that date Billboard reported, that "Marry Me" had been in the charts for three weeks. It had dropped down 4 notches to #73. It would eventually peak at #39 on May 2. It also spent a total of 10 weeks in the country charts. This would prove to be Lowry's biggest chart success. Also in May, Lowry was appearing at the Golden Nugget in Las Vegas where Johnny Western, Chuck Jennings and The Mojos were also appearing. In the July, 18 issue of Billboard, his single "Oh How I Waited" was predicted to make the Country Top 20 and surpass his previous hit. By September 5, the song had been in the charts for 3 weeks and moved up two notches to #70. It would reach its peak position at #65 on the 19th of September. In October that year, "Marry Me" one of 31 songs to receive an ASCAP award. In 1972, Brazil based singer Dave Gordon covered Lowry's composition, "World Champion Fool" which appeared on his Beautiful Sunday The song had previously done well for Lowry in Brazil.

By 1978, Lowry was one of the artists on the roster of the 50 States record label.

=== 1980s to 2000s ===
In 1988, and playing drums, Lowry was part of an ensemble organized by Dallas West which included Leon Baulangcr on fiddle, Dave Musgrave on steel guitar, Ron Lowry, Ted Kowal on bass and Dan Riggs on lead guitar. In May 2001 he and Rags Allen as The Rags Allen and Ron Lowry Duo were playing at the Backstage Bistro Bar every Thursday to Saturday.

One of Lowry's last performances was in January 2007 where he was playing at The Carriage in Mesa, Arizona.

== Death ==
Lowry died on February 6, 2007, in Goodyear, Arizona. He was survived by his wife, son, brother and sisters.

== Discography ==
Singles
Act	Release	Catalogue	Year	Notes #
Butch Lowry	" It's All Over Now" / "Shutting Out The Light"	Dot 45-17216	1969	
Ron Lowry	"Marry Me" / "World Champion Fool"	Republic 1409	1970	
Ron Lowry	"River Of My Mind" / "I Will"	Republic 1413	1970	
Ron Lowry	"Oh How I Waited" / "Look At Me"	Republic 1415	1970	
Ron Lowry	"Temporary" / "Can't Keep My Mind Off Loving You"	50 States FS-40	1976	
Ron Lowry	"He'll Have To Go" / "Open Up Your Door"	50 States FS-53	1977	

Albums
Release	Catalogue	Year	Notes #
Marry Me	Republic RLP-1303	1970	
... A New Beginning		2005	CD
