= Kentucky Route 1954 =

State highway in Kentucky, United States

Kentucky Route 1954
- Husbands Road
- KY 1954 highlighted in red

Route information
- Maintained by KYTC
- Length: 6.537 mi (10.520 km)

Major junctions
- South end: KY 348 near Freemont
- I-24 Exit 11
- North end: US 62 / US 60 Bus. east of Paducah

Location
- Country: United States
- State: Kentucky
- Counties: McCracken

Highway system
- Kentucky State Highway System; Interstate; US; State; Parkways
← KY 1953	→ KY 1955

Kentucky Route 1954 (KY 1954) is a north–south secondary highway located entirely in McCracken County in western Kentucky.

== Intersections ==
The entire route is in McCracken County.

Location	mi	km	Destinations	Notes
	0.000	0.000	KY 348 (Hardmoney Road)	Southern terminus
	2.142	3.447	KY 999 west (Krebs Station Road)	Eastern terminus of KY 999
	3.125	5.029	KY 3075 east (Lydon Road)	Western terminus of KY 3075
Paducah	3.634	5.848	I-24 – St. Louis, Nashville	I-24 Exit 11; Begin concurrency with I-24 BL; Eastern terminus of I-24 Business
Paducah	3.923	6.313	KY 2187 north (Husband Drive)	Southern terminus of KY-2187
Paducah	6.076	9.778	KY 450 south (Oaks Road)	Northern terminus of KY 450
Paducah	6.537	10.520	US 60 (Beltline Highway) / US 62 / US 60 Bus. west / I-24 BL west – Paducah, Calvert City, Smithland	Northern terminus; end concurrency with I-24 Business; eastern terminus of US 60 Business
1.000 mi = 1.609 km; 1.000 km = 0.621 mi: Concurrency terminus
