= Whitehaven (Paducah, Kentucky) =

- U.S. National Register of Historic Places
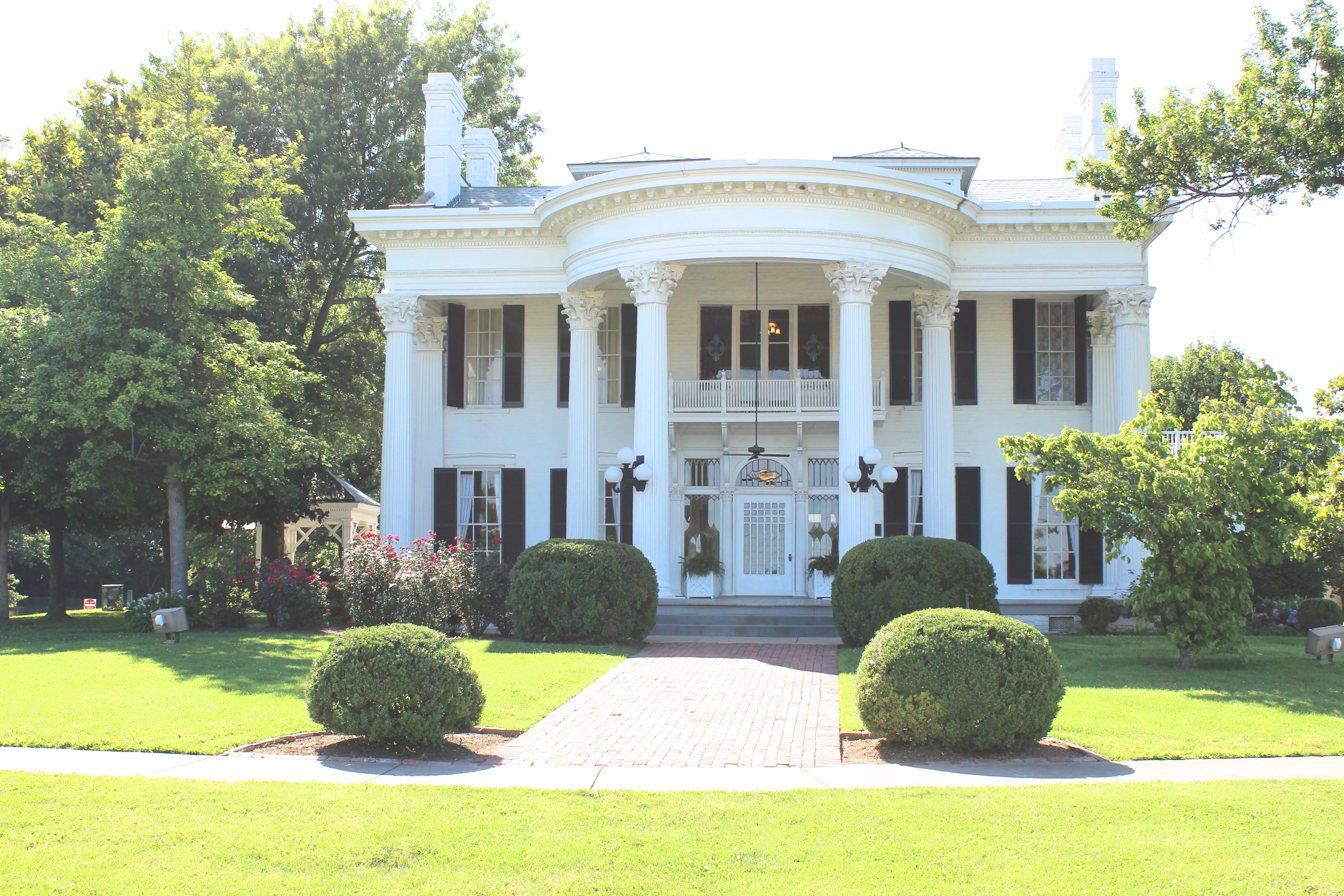
- Whitehaven, 2016

- Location within Kentucky Location within the United States
- Location: Lone Oak Road, off I-24, Paducah, Kentucky
- Coordinates: 37°3′3″N 88°39′10″W
- Built: 1865, 1907
- Architect: A. L. Lassiter
- Architectural style: Classical revival
- NRHP reference No.: 84001824
- Added to NRHP: 1984

Whitehaven (the Anderson-Smith House) is a historic plantation house in Paducah, Kentucky, in use since 1983 as the Kentucky welcome center on Interstate 24 (I-24) near the state border with Illinois. It is the only historic house in the United States also used as a rest area. The house was listed in the National Register of Historic Places on March 1, 1984.

== Construction ==
In 1865, tobacco dealer Edward L. Anderson completed construction of a simple two-story, brick farmhouse, the bricks for which had been fired in a pit on the grounds. The house remained in the Anderson family until sold to a local businessman, Edward Lafayette Atkins, in 1903. Atkins commissioned his friend, architect Alda Lafayette Lassiter to remodel the house in the Classical Revival style. Lassiter added a grand staircase, elaborate plaster ceilings with crown molding, and a large portico with eight Corinthian columns. The house was painted white, and Atkins named it Whitehaven.

In 1908, after the death of Atkins' wife, Atkins sold the house to James P. Smith, mayor of Paducah. The Smiths made many changes, hiring Marshall Fields to do interior decorating. Smith added a storm shelter in the backyard and converted the attic into additional bedrooms for their six children. Nell Smith changed the name of the now 22-room house to "Bide-A-Wee" ("Stay awhile") to honor her Scottish heritage, and she and her daughter created formal gardens on the property.

== Decline ==
The last member of the Smith family moved out of the house in 1968, and it was left with caretakers who seem to have both abused the house and sold fixtures from it. After the caretakers themselves moved out in 1979, vandals broke every remaining pane of glass but one, and water damage rotted ceilings, floors, and portico. A portion of the east wall collapsed.

== Restoration ==
In 1981 the Smith family sold the 32-acre (13 ha) parcel to Paducah Junior College, which planned to use the property in expanding the college. The college did not want to demolish the house, but it did not have the money to restore it either. Later that year, Governor John Y. Brown Jr. and Secretary of Transportation Frank Metts decided that the house could serve as the I-24 welcome center. There was opposition from other tourism-dependent counties, which wanted a modern welcome center nearer the Interstate and the Ohio River and believed that restoring the mansion benefited Paducah and McCracken County at the expense of other nearby tourist areas.

After a brief archaeological investigation, the house was carefully restored using as much original material as possible. The kitchen wing was partially demolished and the remainder adapted to serve as a welcome center, with restrooms, information desk, and storage areas. Three outbuildings — the gazebo, storm shelter, and carriage house — were also saved and repurposed. Part of the second floor of the house was devoted to displaying memorabilia of Vice President Alben Barkley (1877–1956). The welcome center, renamed "Whitehaven," was officially opened on June 23, 1983.
