= Reidland, Kentucky =

Census-designated place in Kentucky, United States

- Census-designated place
- Location within Kentucky Location within the United States
- Coordinates: 37°0′41″N 88°31′18″W
- Country: United States
- State: Kentucky
- County: McCracken

Area
  - Total: 4.86 sq mi (12.60 km^{2})
  - Land: 4.80 sq mi (12.44 km^{2})
  - Water: 0.066 sq mi (0.17 km^{2})
- Elevation: 404 ft (123 m)

Population (2020)
  - Total: 4,526
  - Density: 942.5/sq mi (363.91/km^{2})
- Time zone: UTC-6 (Central (CST))
  - Summer (DST): UTC-5 (CDT)
- ZIP code: 42003 (Paducah)
- Area codes: 270 & 364
- FIPS code: 21-64632
- GNIS feature ID: 0501719

Reidland is an unincorporated community and census-designated place (CDP) in McCracken County, Kentucky, United States. The population was 4,526 at the 2020 census. It is part of the Paducah, KY-IL Metropolitan Statistical Area.

== Geography ==
Reidland is located in southeastern McCracken County at 37°0′41″N 88°31′18″W. It is partially bordered to the north by the Tennessee River and partially to the south by Interstate 24. The city of Paducah is 6 miles (10 km) to the northwest.

U.S. Route 62 passes through the northern part of Reidland, leading northwest to Paducah and east 10 miles (16 km) to Calvert City. U.S. Route 68 has its western terminus in Reidland at US 62, and leads east-southeast 71 miles (114 km) to Hopkinsville. U.S. Route 60 meets US 62 along the northern edge of Reidland; US 60 leads northwest to Paducah and northeast across the Tennessee River 4 miles (6 km) to Ledbetter and 12 miles (19 km) to Smithland.

According to the United States Census Bureau, the Reidland CDP has a total area of 4.87 square miles (12.6 km^{2}), of which 4.79 square miles (12.4 km^{2}) are land and 0.08 square miles (0.21 km^{2}), or 1.56%, are water.

== Demographics ==
Historical population
Census	Pop.	Note	%±
1980	3,730		—
1990	4,054		8.7%
2000	4,353		7.4%
2010	4,491		3.2%
2020	4,526		0.8%
U.S. Decennial Census

=== 2020 census ===
As of the 2020 census, Reidland had a population of 4,526. The median age was 45.4 years. 21.9% of residents were under the age of 18 and 23.4% of residents were 65 years of age or older. For every 100 females there were 96.8 males, and for every 100 females age 18 and over there were 95.0 males age 18 and over.

97.2% of residents lived in urban areas, while 2.8% lived in rural areas.

There were 1,883 households in Reidland, of which 26.2% had children under the age of 18 living in them. Of all households, 55.1% were married-couple households, 16.2% were households with a male householder and no spouse or partner present, and 23.3% were households with a female householder and no spouse or partner present. About 27.8% of all households were made up of individuals and 13.9% had someone living alone who was 65 years of age or older.

There were 2,024 housing units, of which 7.0% were vacant. The homeowner vacancy rate was 1.7% and the rental vacancy rate was 5.7%.

Racial composition as of the 2020 census
Race	Number	Percent
White	4,016	88.7%
Black or African American	139	3.1%
American Indian and Alaska Native	11	0.2%
Asian	37	0.8%
Native Hawaiian and Other Pacific Islander	2	0.0%
Some other race	40	0.9%
Two or more races	281	6.2%
Hispanic or Latino (of any race)	94	2.1%

=== 2000 census ===
As of the census of 2000, there were 4,353 people, 1,793 households, and 1,368 families residing in the CDP. The population density was 907.2 inhabitants per square mile (350.3/km^{2}). There were 1,937 housing units at an average density of 403.7 per square mile (155.9/km^{2}). The racial makeup of the CDP was 97.98% White, 0.30% African American, 0.14% Native American, 0.71% Asian, 0.02% Pacific Islander, 0.28% from other races, and 0.57% from two or more races. Hispanic or Latino of any race were 0.64% of the population.

There were 1,793 households, out of which 32.5% had children under the age of 18 living with them, 65.8% were married couples living together, 7.9% had a female householder with no husband present, and 23.7% were non-families. 21.5% of all households were made up of individuals, and 10.3% had someone living alone who was 65 years of age or older. The average household size was 2.42 and the average family size was 2.81.

In the CDP, the population was spread out, with 22.4% under the age of 18, 6.1% from 18 to 24, 27.2% from 25 to 44, 28.2% from 45 to 64, and 16.1% who were 65 years of age or older. The median age was 42 years. For every 100 females, there were 94.3 males. For every 100 females age 18 and over, there were 90.1 males.

The median income for a household in the CDP was $48,341, and the median income for a family was $54,622. Males had a median income of $45,459 versus $21,915 for females. The per capita income for the CDP was $22,120. About 2.9% of families and 4.4% of the population were below the poverty line, including 4.3% of those under age 18 and 7.1% of those age 65 or over.

== Education ==
It is in the McCracken County School District.

== Distinction ==
In the March 2015 edition of Business Insider, Reidland was mentioned as the Most Affordable Small Town in Kentucky.
