= Saint Johns, Kentucky =

Unincorporated community in Kentucky, United States

- Unincorporated community
- Location within Kentucky Location within the United States
- Coordinates: 36°57′59″N 88°40′19″W
- Country: United States
- State: Kentucky
- County: McCracken
- Elevation: 463 ft (141 m)
- Time zone: UTC-6 (Central (CST))
  - Summer (DST): UTC-5 (CDT)
- Area codes: 270 & 364
- GNIS feature ID: 508998

Saint Johns is an unincorporated community in McCracken County, Kentucky, United States.

== Notable people ==
- Ray Sanders, singer, was born in Saint Johns.
