= Symsonia, Kentucky =

Census-designated place in Kentucky, United States

- Census-designated place
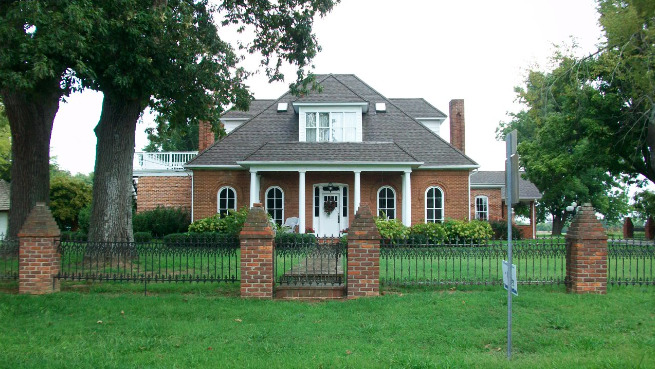
- Pete Lyles House

- Symsonia's position in Kentucky
- Coordinates: 36°55′15″N 88°31′07″W
- Country: United States
- State: Kentucky
- County: Graves

Area
  - Total: 1.53 sq mi (3.96 km^{2})
  - Land: 1.52 sq mi (3.93 km^{2})
  - Water: 0.0077 sq mi (0.02 km^{2})
- Elevation: 410 ft (120 m)

Population (2020)
  - Total: 622
  - Density: 409.5/sq mi (158.09/km^{2})
- Time zone: UTC-6 (Central (CST))
  - Summer (DST): UTC-5 (CDT)
- ZIP Code: 42082
- Area codes: 270 & 364
- GNIS feature ID: 2629690

Symsonia is an unincorporated community and census-designated place (CDP) in Graves County, Kentucky, United States. The community lies in the far northeastern part of the county, 13 miles (21 km) southeast of Paducah, 11 miles (18 km) northwest of Benton, and 15 miles (24 km) northeast of the county seat Mayfield, in the Jackson Purchase region of the state. As of the 2020 census, Symsonia had a population of 622.

== Geography ==
The Symsonia CDP has a total area of 1.5 square miles (4.0 km^{2}), of which 0.01 square miles (0.02 km^{2}), or 0.01 square miles (0.02 km^{2}), or 0.56%, is water. The community is located at the intersection of Kentucky Highways 131 and 348. The intersection contains the community's only four-way stop and only flashing red light. It lies at an elevation of 407 feet (124 m) above sea level and is between the East and West Forks of the Clarks River, a major tributary of the Tennessee River.

== Demographics ==
Historical population
Census	Pop.	Note	%±
2020	622		—
U.S. Decennial Census
