= Woodlawn-Oakdale, Kentucky =

Census-designated place in Kentucky, United States

Farley (formerly Woodlawn-Oakdale), Kentucky
- CDP
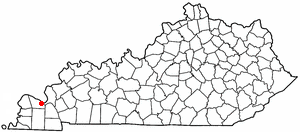
- Location of Farley (Woodlawn-Oakdale), Kentucky
- Coordinates: 37°2′38″N 88°34′16″W
- Country: United States
- State: Kentucky
- County: McCracken

Area
  - Total: 5.9 sq mi (15.4 km^{2})
  - Land: 5.9 sq mi (15.4 km^{2})
  - Water: 0 sq mi (0.0 km^{2})

Population (2000)
  - Total: 4,937
  - Density: 832/sq mi (321.2/km^{2})
- Time zone: UTC-6 (Central (CST))
  - Summer (DST): UTC-5 (CDT)
- FIPS code: 21-84567

Farley (formerly Woodlawn-Oakdale) is a census-designated place (CDP) in McCracken County, Kentucky, United States. The population was 4,701 at the 2010 census, a decline from 4,937 in 2000. It is part of the Paducah, KY-IL Micropolitan Statistical Area.

== Geography ==
Farley (Woodlawn-Oakdale) is located at 37°2′38″N 88°34′16″W (37.043786, -88.571223). The town sits on the Clarks River, the absolute lowest tributary of the Tennessee River, near its mouth as well as the Tennessee River's own confluence with the Ohio River, just 70 km (43.5 mi) upstream from its confluence with the Mississippi River itself.

According to the United States Census Bureau, the CDP has a total area of 5.9 square miles (15 km^{2}), of which 5.9 square miles (15 km^{2}) is land and 0.17% is water.

== Demographics ==
As of the census of 2000, there were 4,937 people, 2,049 households, and 1,407 families residing in the CDP. The population density was 831.8 inhabitants per square mile (321.2/km^{2}). There were 2,243 housing units at an average density of 377.9 per square mile (145.9/km^{2}). The racial makeup of the CDP was 94.55% White, 2.51% African American, 0.41% Native American, 0.41% Asian, 0.10% Pacific Islander, 0.34% from other races, and 1.68% from two or more races. Hispanic or Latino of any race were 0.87% of the population.

There were 2,049 households, out of which 32.2% had children under the age of 18 living with them, 51.0% were married couples living together, 13.2% had a female householder with no husband present, and 31.3% were non-families. 26.7% of all households were made up of individuals, and 9.7% had someone living alone who was 65 years of age or older. The average household size was 2.41 and the average family size was 2.89.

In the CDP, the population was spread out, with 25.1% under the age of 18, 8.9% from 18 to 24, 30.4% from 25 to 44, 23.5% from 45 to 64, and 12.0% who were 65 years of age or older. The median age was 35 years. For every 100 females, there were 92.6 males. For every 100 females age 18 and over, there were 89.8 males.

The median income for a household in the CDP was $27,313, and the median income for a family was $31,658. Males had a median income of $28,789 versus $17,316 for females. The per capita income for the CDP was $13,344. About 17.6% of families and 21.3% of the population were below the poverty line, including 27.8% of those under age 18 and 14.0% of those age 65 or over.
