= Hardmoney, Kentucky =

Unincorporated community in Kentucky, US

Coordinates: 36°56′41.97″N 88°34′55.15″W

Hardmoney is an unincorporated community in Graves County, Kentucky, United States.

A post office was established in the community in 1880 by John H. Ballance, but it closed in 1900. Hardmoney is named for the political controversy of the day over the gold standard.

== See also ==
- Place names considered unusual
