= Marry Me (Barry Mason and Les Reed song) =

Song by Ron Lowry

from the album Marry Me
- B-side: "World Champion Fool"
- Released: January 1970
- Genre: Country
- Length: 2:30
- Label: Republic 1409
- Songwriters: Barry Mason, Les Reed
- Producer: Charlie Adams

Ron Lowry singles chronology
"Marry Me" (1970)	"River Of My Mind" (1970)

"Marry Me" is a song written by Barry Mason and Les Reed. It was first recorded by Engelbert Humperdinck and was a country hit for Ron Lowry in 1970.

== Background ==
The song which was written by Barry Mason and Les Reed was originally recorded by Engelbert Humperdinck and appeared on his 1969 Engelbert album. Ron Lowry released his version in January 1970 and the following year Dean Martin recorded a version of the song. Lowry's version was produced by Charlie Adams. The publisher was Jewel Music Co., Inc. It was released on Republic 1409.

In Brazil, the single had a release on Square SQ/023 with "World Champion Fool" as the A side and "Marry Me" as the B side. It appears to have been a hit there. It appeared on the following various artist compilations, Topmaster, issued on Square SQ/72, Explosão mundial issued on Itamaraty 1953, Isto É Bom Demais issued on Itamaraty 1960, and Da Parada Americana Volume 3 issued on Square SQ/016

=== Chart performance ===
In the February 14, 1970, issue of Cash Box, its editors predicted that Lowry's version of the song was going to be a hit.

An article about Lowry that appeared in the March 14 edition of the Arizona Republic stated that the record was now being released throughout Europe and there were expectations of international popularity for it. It peaked at No. 39 on May 2 and spent a total of ten weeks on the country singles chart.

"Marry Me" was one of 31 songs to receive an ASCAP award in October 1970.
