= Calvert City, Kentucky =

- City
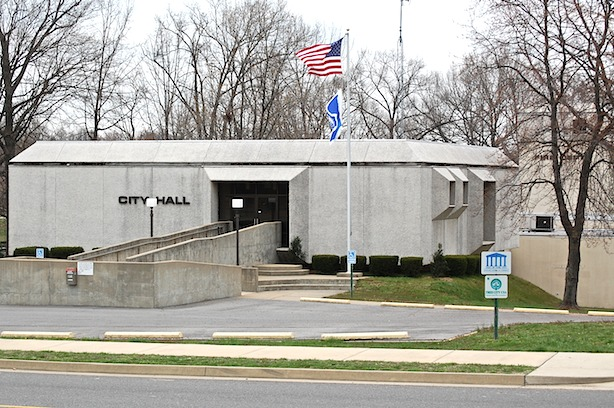
- City Hall, located on 5th Avenue

- Flag Logo

- Location in Marshall County, Kentucky
- Coordinates: 37°1′59″N 88°20′58″W
- Country: United States
- State: Kentucky
- County: Marshall

Area
  - Total: 18.51 sq mi (47.94 km^{2})
  - Land: 17.88 sq mi (46.30 km^{2})
  - Water: 0.63 sq mi (1.64 km^{2})
- Elevation: 381 ft (116 m)

Population (2020)
  - Total: 2,514
  - Estimate (2022): 2,517
  - Density: 141/sq mi (54.3/km^{2})
- Time zone: UTC-6 (Central (CST))
  - Summer (DST): UTC-5 (CDT)
- ZIP code: 42029 (Calvert City), 42044 (Gilbertsville)
- Area codes: 270 & 364
- FIPS code: 21-12016
- GNIS feature ID: 2403972
- Website: calvertcityky.gov

Calvert City is a home rule-class city in Marshall County, Kentucky, United States. The population was 2,514 at the 2020 census.

== History ==
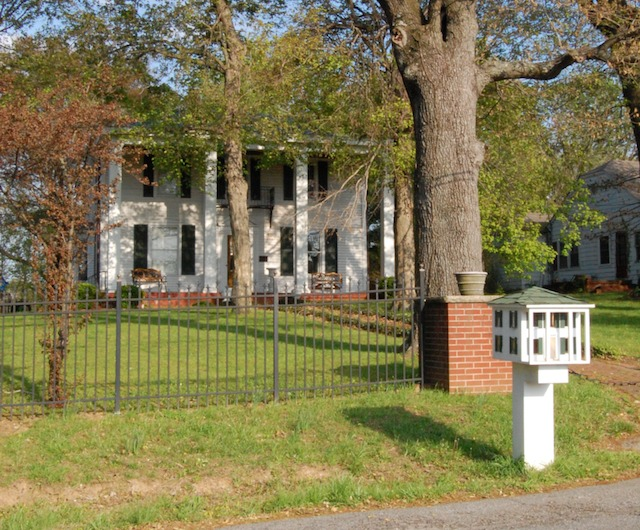
Oak Hill, built by Potilla Calvert

Calvert City was named for Potilla Willis Calvert. He built his home, Oak Hill, in 1860 and around a decade later gave a portion of his land to a new railroad, specifying that a station be built near his home. That station served as the starting point of the town, which was incorporated on March 18, 1871. The railroad station and post office long favored the shorter Calvert, but the Board on Geographic Names reversed its earlier decision in 1957 and switched to the longer form.

By 1896, Calvert City was known as a sundown town, where African Americans were not allowed to reside. By 1908, the rest of Marshall County had also expelled its African American residents.

During the Ohio River flood of 1937, Calvert City's business district and much of the residential area were severely damaged by floodwaters.

In the 1940s, the construction of nearby Kentucky Dam by the Tennessee Valley Authority brought plentiful electric power that led many industrial plants, mostly chemical manufacturers, to locate between the city and the Tennessee River. Merchant Luther Draffen was instrumental in attracting the dam and industrial plants.

== Geography ==
Calvert City is in northern Marshall County, along the south bank of the Tennessee River, 13 miles (21 km) upstream from its mouth at the Ohio River. It is 18 miles (29 km) east of Paducah, 13 miles (21 km) north of Benton, the Marshall county seat, and 30 miles (48 km) west of Princeton. The city limits extend southeast as far as the western shore of Kentucky Lake on the Tennessee River.

According to the United States Census Bureau, Calvert City has a total area of 18.5 square miles (48 km^{2}), of which 17.9 square miles (46 km^{2}) are land and 0.6 square miles (1.6 km^{2}), or 3.42%, are water.

== Demographics ==
Historical population
Census	Pop.	Note	%±
1880	85		—
1890	142		67.1%
1900	127		−10.6%
1910	124		−2.4%
1920	226		82.3%
1930	319		41.2%
1960	1,505		—
1970	2,104		39.8%
1980	2,388		13.5%
1990	2,531		6.0%
2000	2,701		6.7%
2010	2,566		−5.0%
2020	2,514		−2.0%
2022 (est.)	2,517		0.1%
U.S. Decennial Census

=== 2020 census ===
As of the 2020 census, Calvert City had a population of 2,514. The median age was 44.3 years. 22.3% of residents were under the age of 18 and 25.1% of residents were 65 years of age or older. For every 100 females there were 86.2 males, and for every 100 females age 18 and over there were 81.3 males age 18 and over.

0.0% of residents lived in urban areas, while 100.0% lived in rural areas.

There were 1,068 households in Calvert City, of which 29.1% had children under the age of 18 living in them. Of all households, 45.5% were married-couple households, 17.0% were households with a male householder and no spouse or partner present, and 31.6% were households with a female householder and no spouse or partner present. About 33.8% of all households were made up of individuals and 17.8% had someone living alone who was 65 years of age or older.

There were 1,348 housing units, of which 20.8% were vacant. The homeowner vacancy rate was 2.5% and the rental vacancy rate was 9.9%.

Racial composition as of the 2020 census
Race	Number	Percent
White	2,386	94.9%
Black or African American	8	0.3%
American Indian and Alaska Native	2	0.1%
Asian	18	0.7%
Native Hawaiian and Other Pacific Islander	0	0.0%
Some other race	14	0.6%
Two or more races	86	3.4%
Hispanic or Latino (of any race)	37	1.5%

=== 2000 census ===
As of the 2000 census, there were 2,701 people, 1,141 households, and 787 families residing in the city. The population density was 194.5 inhabitants per square mile (75.1/km^{2}). There were 1,203 housing units at an average density of 86.6 units per square mile (33.4 units/km^{2}). The racial makeup of the city was 99.00% White, 0.26% Native American, 0.07% Asian, 0.04% from other races, and 0.63% from two or more races. Hispanic or Latino of any race were 0.37% of the population.

There were 1,141 households, out of which 28.4% had children under the age of 18 living with them, 55.9% were married couples living together, 9.7% had a female householder with no husband present, and 31.0% were non-families. 28.7% of all households were made up of individuals, and 12.3% had someone living alone who was 65 years of age or older. The average household size was 2.27 and the average family size was 2.76.

The age distribution was 21.0% under the age of 18, 7.0% from 18 to 24, 25.4% from 25 to 44, 26.3% from 45 to 64, and 20.2% who were 65 years of age or older. The median age was 43 years. For every 100 females, there were 88.7 males. For every 100 females age 18 and over, there were 82.3 males.

The median income for a household in the city was $41,107, and the median income for a family was $48,098. Males had a median income of $43,464 versus $23,403 for females. The per capita income for the city was $22,473. About 4.5% of families and 6.9% of the population were below the poverty line, including 7.1% of those under age 18 and 10.3% of those age 65 or over.

== Economy ==
Calvert City has 16 industrial plants that are a key source of employment for Western Kentucky. The majority are chemical manufacturers, with some steel and metallurgical plants and industrial services firms.

Company	Employees
Wacker Chemical Corporation	380
Arkema Chemicals	264
Carbide Graphite	104
B. F. Goodrich Company	130
Westlake Monomers/CA&O	295
Westlake PVC Corporation	77
Ashland Inc.	563
Gerdau Ameristeel, Inc.	205
CC Metals and Alloys, Inc.	210
LWD	225
Estron Chemicals, Inc.	32
Rail Services	31
Ibex Industries, Inc.	65
Jexco	35
Degussa Corporation International Catalyst Technology	67
Metal Fab, Inc.	45

== Government ==
Calvert City has a mayor-council form of government, as allowed by its standing as a home rule-class city under Kentucky's system of local government classification.

While Marshall County had been dry since 1938, on July 28, 2015, the county voted by a margin of 6,431 to 6,229 to permit the sale of both packaged liquor and drink sales. Currently, Calvert City is the only city in the county that also permits the sale of alcohol on Sunday.

== Media ==
=== Newspaper ===
- The Lake News, a weekly newspaper, is owned and operated by Loyd W. Ford. It was founded in 1984 and is the newspaper of record for Calvert City. The Lake News has a circulation of 2,800 and is distributed in Marshall and Livingston counties in Kentucky.

=== Radio ===
- WCCK-FM — 95.7

== Education ==
Calvert City has a lending library, a branch of the Marshall County Public Library.

== Infrastructure ==
=== Transportation ===
Calvert City is a hub for surface transportation. The city is the northern terminus of the Julian M. Carroll Purchase Parkway, providing a link to Memphis, Tennessee. The city is skirted on the south by Interstate 24, linking Calvert City to Nashville and St. Louis, and, via I-69, and via the Western Kentucky Parkway as well, Louisville and Lexington. The city has rail access through the Paducah and Louisville Railway main line and is a commercial port on the Tennessee River.

There is no bus service or other mass transit.

== See also ==
- List of sundown towns in the United States
